= Vertamocorii (Narbonensis) =

Gallic tribe

The Vertamocorii (Gaulish: *Uertamocorī) were a Celtic people that lived in the Vercors region during the Iron Age and the Roman period.

== Name ==
The Gaulish ethnonym Vertamo-corii is generally translated as 'those with the superior host' or 'the excellent troops', from uertamos ('superior; summit') attached to corios ('army'). Alternately, it could mean 'troops from the summit'.

The toponym Vercors derives from the name of the Gallic tribe.

== Geography ==
The name Vercors appears in local place names such as Saint-Agnan-en-Vercors, Saint-Martin-en-Vercors, Saint-Julien-en-Vercors, La Chapelle-en-Vercors, and others. According to Guy Barruol, since these villages are early Christian or early medieval foundations whose dedication to widely venerated saints led to the addition of the qualifier "en Vercors" to distinguish them from homonymous settlements, the naming pattern may indicate the true extent of the pagus of the Vertamocorii.

== History ==
During the Roman period, they probably belonged to the Vocontian confederation.
