= Sainte-Eulalie-en-Royans =

- Commune
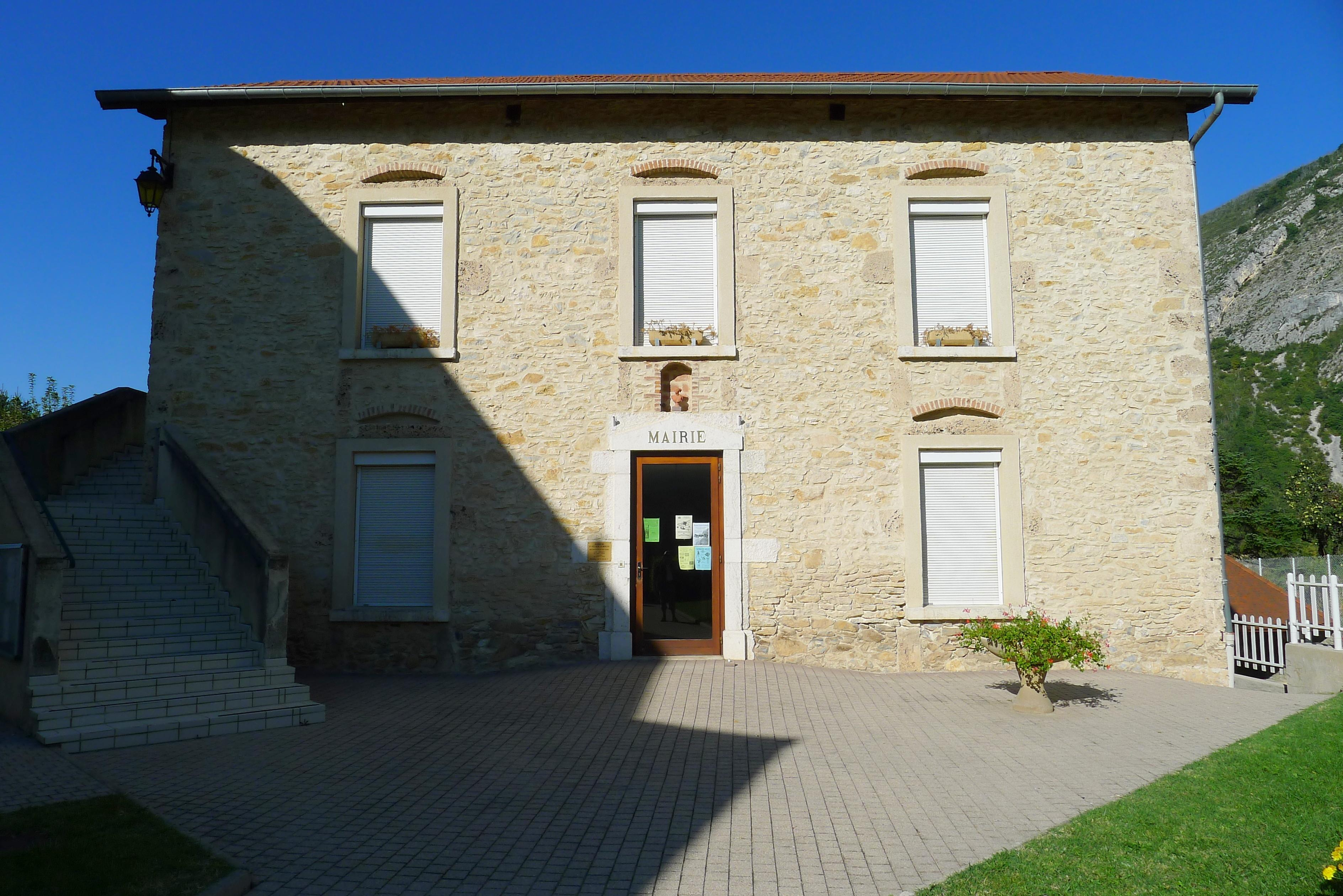
- Town hall
- Location of Sainte-Eulalie-en-Royans
- Location within France Location within Auvergne-Rhône-Alpes
- Coordinates: 45°02′54″N 5°20′32″E
- Country: France
- Region: Auvergne-Rhône-Alpes
- Department: Drôme
- Arrondissement: Die
- Canton: Vercors-Monts du Matin
- Intercommunality: Royans-Vercors

Government
  - Mayor (2020–2026): Olivier Testoud
- Area^{1}: 6.14 km^{2} (2.37 sq mi)
- Elevation: 286 m (938 ft)
- Highest elevation: 1,053 m (3,455 ft)
- Lowest elevation: 178 m (584 ft)
- Population (2023): 538
  - Density: 87.6/km^{2} (227/sq mi)
- Time zone: UTC+01:00 (CET)
  - Summer (DST): UTC+02:00 (CEST)
- INSEE/Postal code: 26302 /26190
- ^{1} French Land Register data, which excludes lakes, ponds, glaciers > 1 km^{2} (0.386 sq mi or 247 acres) and river estuaries.

Sainte-Eulalie-en-Royans (French pronunciation: [sɛ̃t‿ølali ɑ̃ ʁwajɑ̃]; Vivaro-Alpine: Santa Eulàlia de Roians) is a commune in the Drôme department in the region Auvergne-Rhône-Alpes, southeastern France.

== Population ==
Historical population
Year	Pop.	±% p.a.
1968	282	—
1975	360	+3.55%
1982	386	+1.00%
1990	402	+0.51%
1999	507	+2.61%
2007	502	−0.12%
2012	576	+2.79%
2017	544	−1.14%
2023	538	−0.18%
Source: INSEE

== Geography ==
Sainte-Eulalie-en-Royans is located 7 km northeast of Saint-Jean-en-Royans and 34 km east of Romans-sur-Isère.

The bordering communes are Pont-en-Royans, Saint-Laurent-en-Royans and Échevis.

=== Remarkable Geographical Sites ===
The "Réculée des Grands Goulets" is a remarkable geological site of 1,645.95 hectares, crossed by the Vernaison, which is located in the towns of Châtelus (in the place called Grands Goulets), La Chapelle-en-Vercors, Échevis, Sainte-Eulalie-en-Royans, Saint-Julien-en-Vercors, Saint-Laurent-en-Royans, Saint-Martin-en-Vercors and Pont-en-Royans. In 2014, it was classified in the "Inventory of Geological Heritage"».

== History ==
- January 9, 1965: "Sainte-Eulalie" was changed to the longer "Sainte-Eulalie-en-Royans."

== See also ==
- Communes of the Drôme department
- Parc naturel régional du Vercors
