= Jaillans =

- Commune
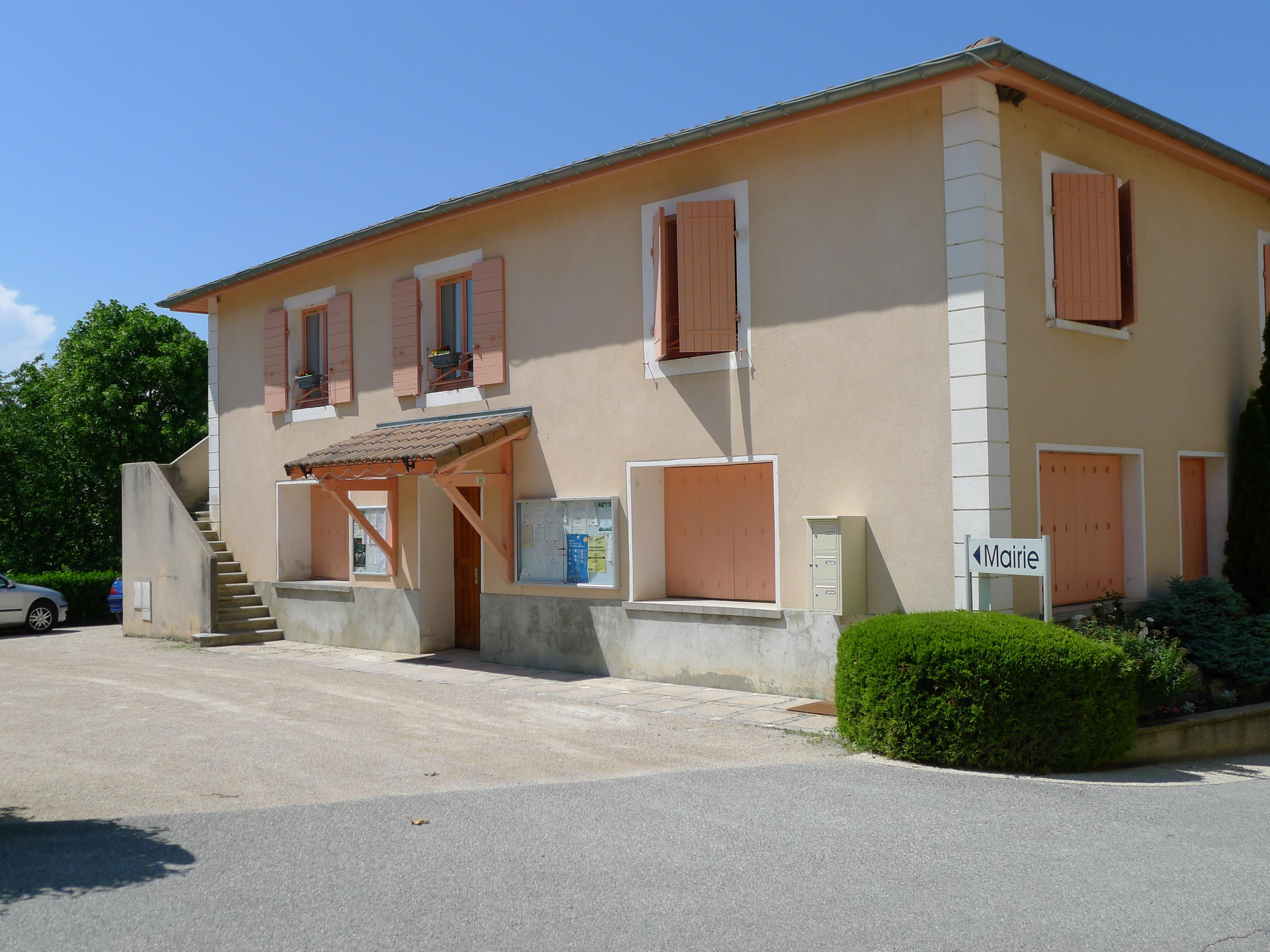
- Town hall
- Location of Jaillans
- Location within France Location within Auvergne-Rhône-Alpes
- Coordinates: 45°01′45″N 5°10′31″E
- Country: France
- Region: Auvergne-Rhône-Alpes
- Department: Drôme
- Arrondissement: Valence
- Canton: Vercors-Monts du Matin
- Intercommunality: Valence Romans Agglo

Government
  - Mayor (2020–2026): Jean-Noël Fournat
- Area^{1}: 9.04 km^{2} (3.49 sq mi)
- Elevation: 294 m (965 ft)
- Highest elevation: 395 m (1,296 ft)
- Lowest elevation: 159 m (522 ft)
- Population (2023): 1,009
  - Density: 112/km^{2} (289/sq mi)
- Time zone: UTC+01:00 (CET)
  - Summer (DST): UTC+02:00 (CEST)
- INSEE/Postal code: 26381 /26300
- ^{1} French Land Register data, which excludes lakes, ponds, glaciers > 1 km^{2} (0.386 sq mi or 247 acres) and river estuaries.

Jaillans (French pronunciation: [ʒajɑ̃]; Occitan: Jalhan) is a commune in the Drôme department in southeastern France. It was created in 1950 from part of the commune Beauregard-Baret.

== Population ==
Historical population
Year	Pop.	±% p.a.
1968	369	—
1975	368	−0.04%
1982	417	+1.80%
1990	520	+2.80%
1999	597	+1.55%
2007	761	+3.08%
2012	881	+2.97%
2017	892	+0.25%
2023	1,009	+2.08%
Source: INSEE

== See also ==
- Communes of the Drôme department
