= Oriol-en-Royans =

- Commune
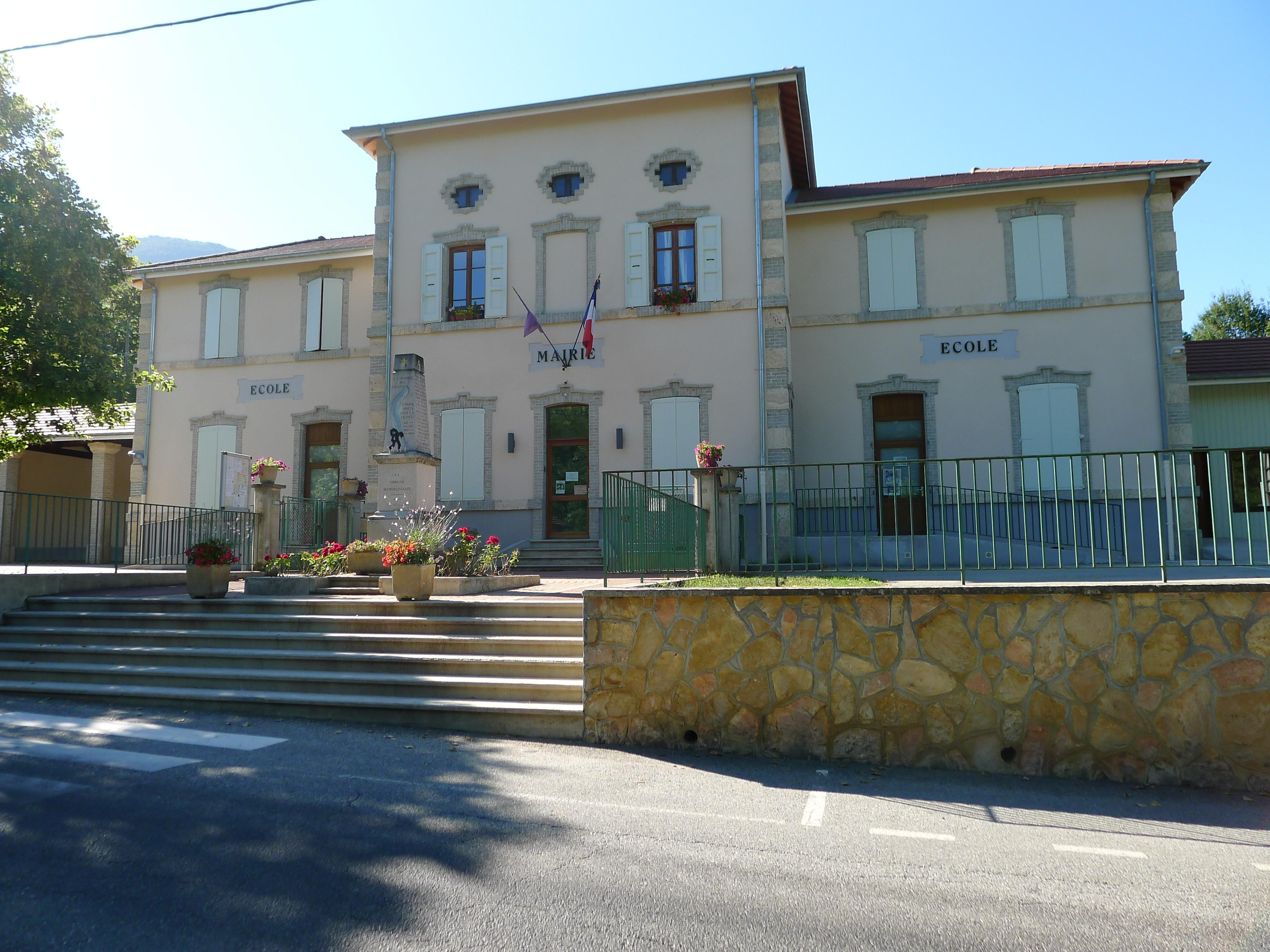
- Town hall
- Location of Oriol-en-Royans
- Location within France Location within Auvergne-Rhône-Alpes
- Coordinates: 44°59′57″N 5°16′28″E
- Country: France
- Region: Auvergne-Rhône-Alpes
- Department: Drôme
- Arrondissement: Die
- Canton: Vercors-Monts du Matin
- Intercommunality: Royans-Vercors

Government
  - Mayor (2020–2026): Jean-Jacques Dallon
- Area^{1}: 16.01 km^{2} (6.18 sq mi)
- Elevation: 274 m (899 ft)
- Highest elevation: 1,200 m (3,900 ft)
- Lowest elevation: 238 m (781 ft)
- Population (2023): 518
  - Density: 32.4/km^{2} (83.8/sq mi)
- Time zone: UTC+01:00 (CET)
  - Summer (DST): UTC+02:00 (CEST)
- INSEE/Postal code: 26223 /26190
- ^{1} French Land Register data, which excludes lakes, ponds, glaciers > 1 km^{2} (0.386 sq mi or 247 acres) and river estuaries.

Oriol-en-Royans (French pronunciation: [ɔʁjɔl ɑ̃ ʁwajɑ̃]; Occitan: Auriòl de Roians) is a commune in the Drôme department in southeastern France.

== Population ==
Historical population
Year	Pop.	±% p.a.
1968	385	—
1975	308	−3.14%
1982	329	+0.95%
1990	349	+0.74%
1999	377	+0.86%
2007	503	+3.67%
2012	541	+1.47%
2017	532	−0.33%
2023	518	−0.44%
Source: INSEE

== See also ==
- Communes of the Drôme department
- Parc naturel régional du Vercors
