= Charpey =

- Commune
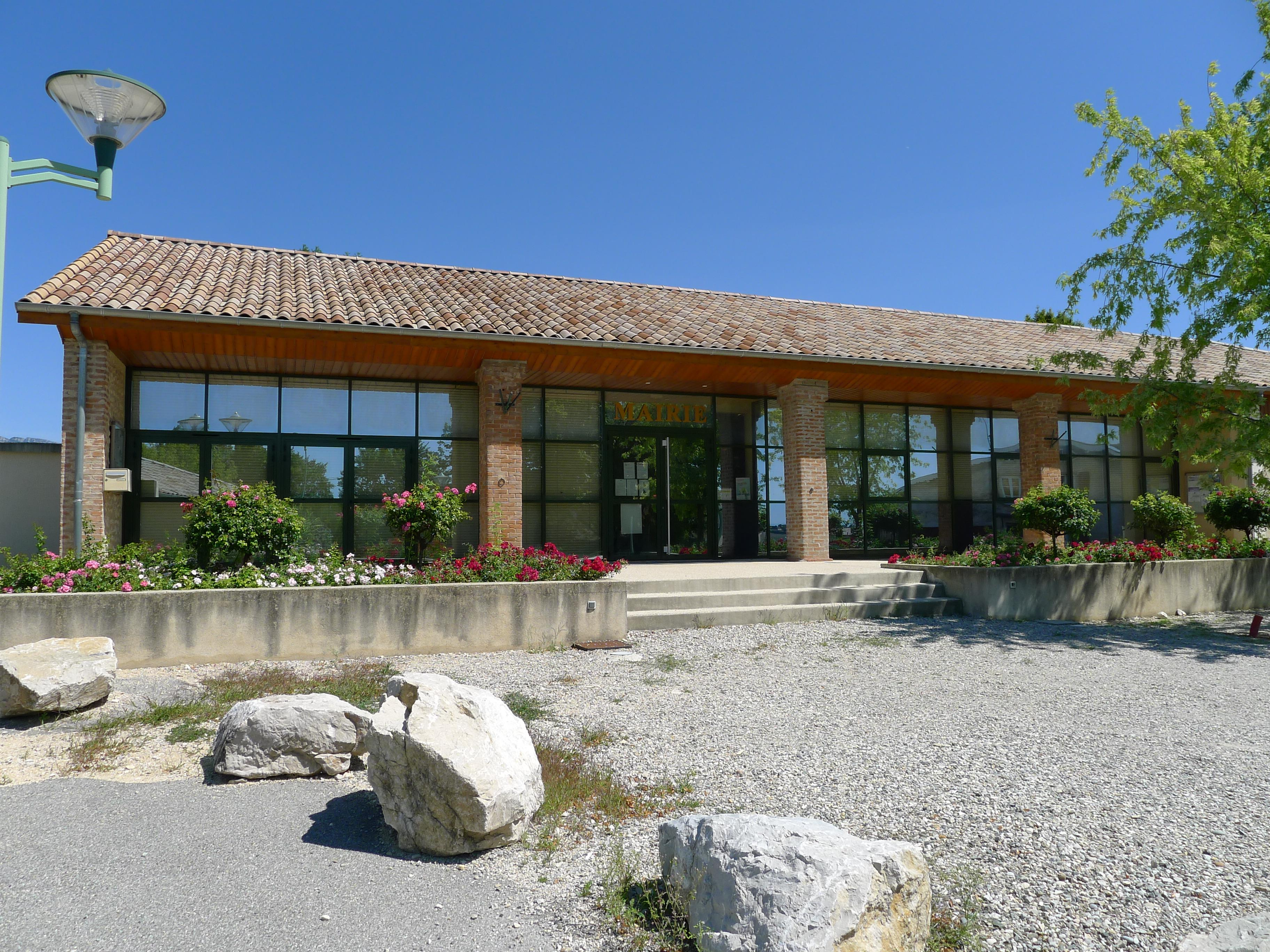
- The town hall in Charpey

- Coat of arms
- Location of Charpey
- Location within France Location within Auvergne-Rhône-Alpes
- Coordinates: 44°56′21″N 5°05′37″E
- Country: France
- Region: Auvergne-Rhône-Alpes
- Department: Drôme
- Arrondissement: Valence
- Canton: Vercors-Monts du Matin
- Intercommunality: CA Valence Romans Agglo

Government
  - Mayor (2020–2026): Lydie Gregoire Veisseix
- Area^{1}: 15.48 km^{2} (5.98 sq mi)
- Highest elevation: 408 m (1,339 ft)
- Lowest elevation: 209 m (686 ft)
- Population (2023): 1,547
  - Density: 99.94/km^{2} (258.8/sq mi)
- Time zone: UTC+01:00 (CET)
  - Summer (DST): UTC+02:00 (CEST)
- INSEE/Postal code: 26079 /26300
- ^{1} French Land Register data, which excludes lakes, ponds, glaciers > 1 km^{2} (0.386 sq mi or 247 acres) and river estuaries.

Charpey (French pronunciation: [ʃaʁpɛ]; Occitan: Charpei) is a commune in the Drôme department in southeastern France.

== Population ==
Historical population
Year	Pop.	±% p.a.
1968	630	—
1975	637	+0.16%
1982	739	+2.14%
1990	806	+1.09%
1999	901	+1.25%
2007	1,201	+3.66%
2012	1,274	+1.19%
2017	1,417	+2.15%
2023	1,547	+1.47%
Source: INSEE

== See also ==
- Communes of the Drôme department
