= Hostun =

- Commune
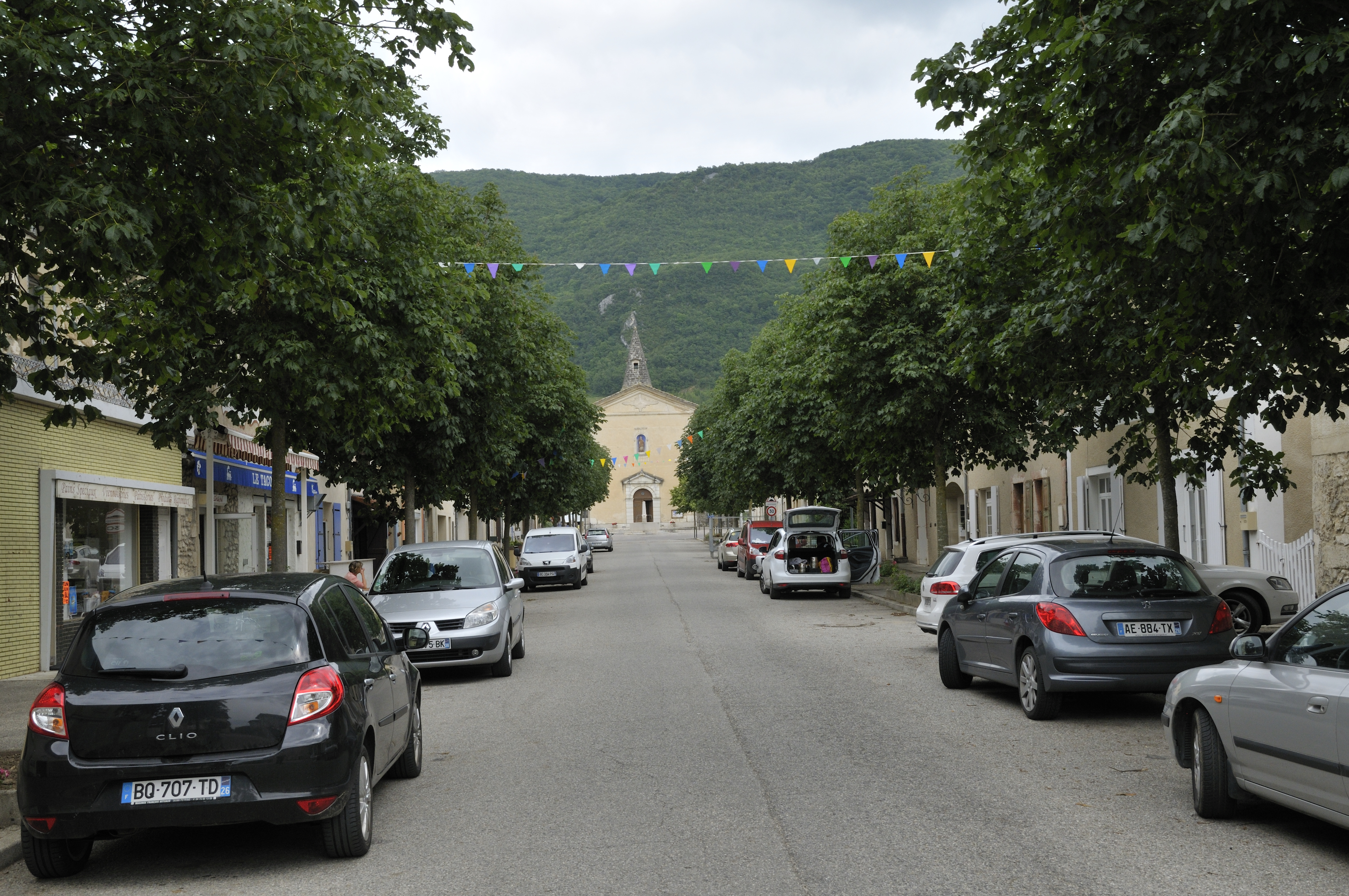
- The Avenue des Marronniers in Hostun
- Location of Hostun
- Location within France Location within Auvergne-Rhône-Alpes
- Coordinates: 45°02′25″N 5°11′55″E
- Country: France
- Region: Auvergne-Rhône-Alpes
- Department: Drôme
- Arrondissement: Valence
- Canton: Vercors-Monts du Matin
- Intercommunality: CA Valence Romans Agglo

Government
  - Mayor (2020–2026): Bruno Vitte
- Area^{1}: 18.24 km^{2} (7.04 sq mi)
- Elevation: 325 m (1,066 ft)
- Highest elevation: 1,133 m (3,717 ft)
- Lowest elevation: 196 m (643 ft)
- Population (2023): 1,037
  - Density: 56.85/km^{2} (147.2/sq mi)
- Time zone: UTC+01:00 (CET)
  - Summer (DST): UTC+02:00 (CEST)
- INSEE/Postal code: 26149 /26730
- ^{1} French Land Register data, which excludes lakes, ponds, glaciers > 1 km^{2} (0.386 sq mi or 247 acres) and river estuaries.

Hostun (French pronunciation: [ɔstœ̃]; Occitan: Ostun) is a commune in the Drôme department in southeastern France.

== Population ==
Historical population
Year	Pop.	±% p.a.
1968	705	—
1975	667	−0.79%
1982	664	−0.06%
1990	653	−0.21%
1999	758	+1.67%
2007	926	+2.53%
2012	933	+0.15%
2017	983	+1.05%
2023	1,037	+0.90%
Source: INSEE

== See also ==
- Communes of the Drôme department
