= Canton of Vercors-Monts du Matin =

Coordinates: 45.00°N 5.09°E

The canton of Vercors-Monts du Matin is an administrative division of the Drôme department, southeastern France. It was created at the French canton reorganisation which came into effect in March 2015. Its seat is in Chatuzange-le-Goubet.

It consists of the following communes:

1. Barbières
2. La Baume-d'Hostun
3. Beauregard-Baret
4. Bésayes
5. Bouvante
6. Le Chaffal
7. La Chapelle-en-Vercors
8. Charpey
9. Chatuzange-le-Goubet
10. Échevis
11. Eymeux
12. Hostun
13. Jaillans
14. Léoncel
15. Marches
16. La Motte-Fanjas
17. Oriol-en-Royans
18. Rochechinard
19. Rochefort-Samson
20. Saint-Agnan-en-Vercors
21. Sainte-Eulalie-en-Royans
22. Saint-Jean-en-Royans
23. Saint-Julien-en-Vercors
24. Saint-Laurent-en-Royans
25. Saint-Martin-en-Vercors
26. Saint-Martin-le-Colonel
27. Saint-Nazaire-en-Royans
28. Saint-Thomas-en-Royans
29. Saint-Vincent-la-Commanderie
30. Vassieux-en-Vercors
