= Vercors Regional Natural Park =

French regional natural park

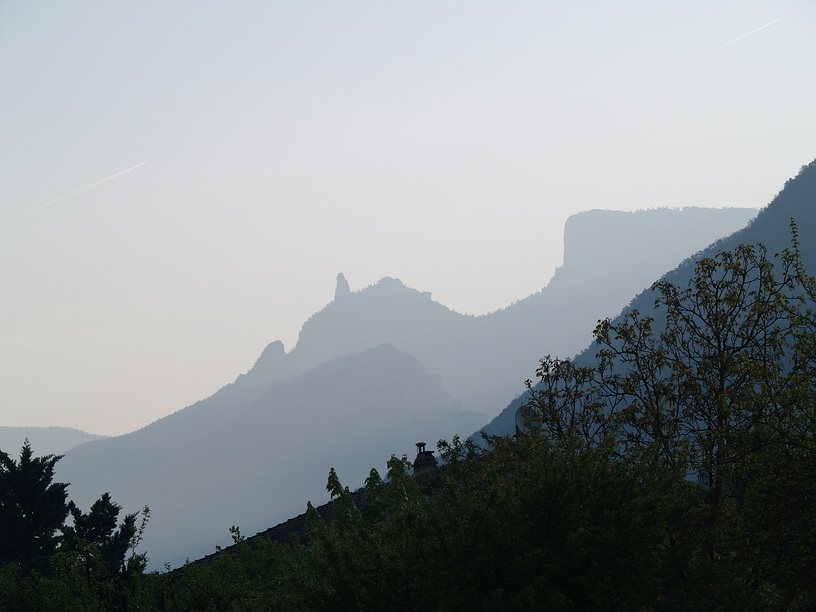
- Interactive map of Vercors Regional Natural Park
- Location: Rhône-Alpes, Drôme; Isère, France
- Coordinates: 44.928°N 5.49°E
- Established: 1970
- Governing body: Fédération des parcs naturels régionaux de France
- Website: http://www.parc-du-vercors.fr/

The Vercors Regional Natural Park (French: Parc naturel régional du Vercors) is a protected area of forested mountains in the Rhône-Alpes region of southeastern France.

== Geography ==
Set upon a limestone plateau south of Grenoble, the park extends into the French Western Alps. It spans two departments, Drôme and Isère, and covers a total area of 135,000 hectares (330,000 acres). The plateau's main elevation reaches 1,000 metres (3,300 ft) while the eastern Alpine mountain ridge tops 2,300 metres (7,500 ft) with Le Grand Veymont (2341m).

The Vercors area is peppered with caves. During World War II, it served as a safe and defensible position for the French Resistance: Forteresse de la Résistance. The area now contains around three hundred monuments to the Resistance, including a memorial center and the preserved remains of a destroyed village.

In modern times, Vercors has become a popular tourist destination frequented for skiing, hiking and spelunking. Several small communes dot the landscape, supported principally by forestry, shepherding and tourism. The area was officially designated a regional natural park in 1970.

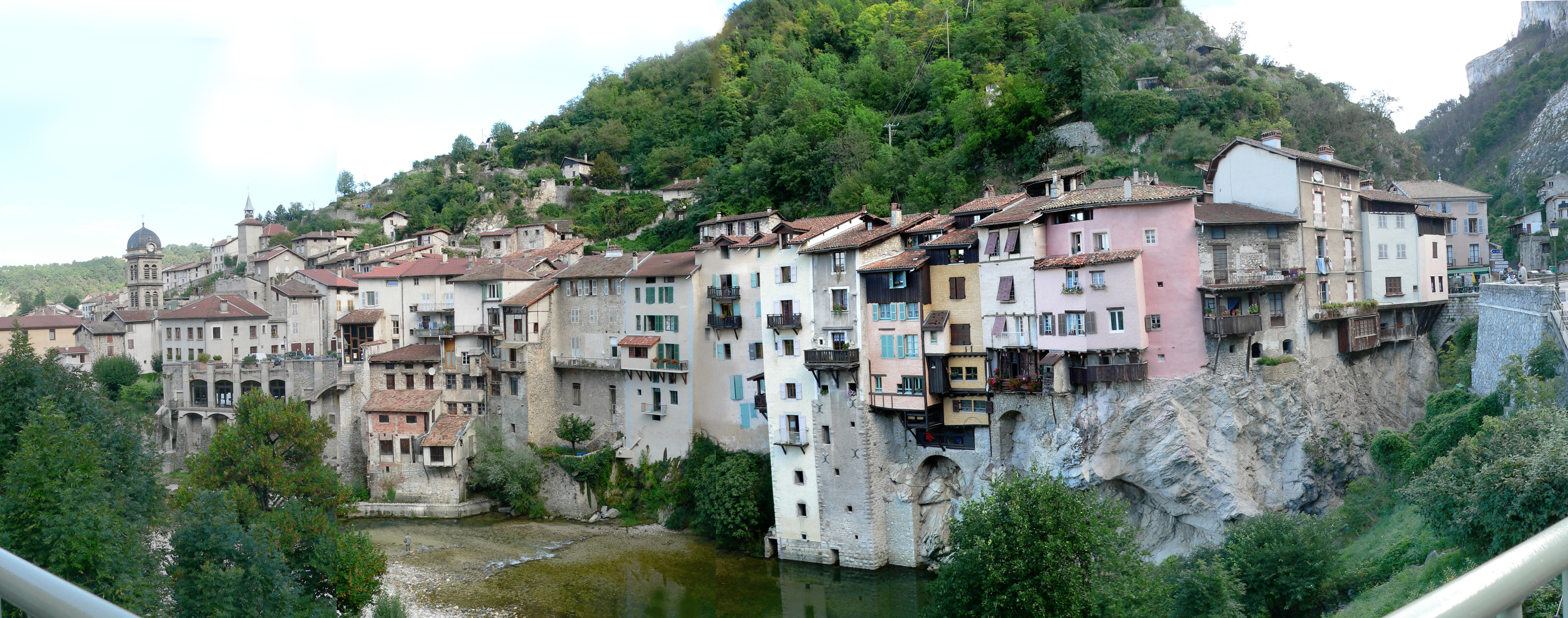
The village of Pont-en-Royans perched on the edge of the Vercors

== Member communes ==
The Vercors parklands include the following communes:

- Auberives-en-Royans
- Autrans
- Beaufort-sur-Gervanne
- Beauvoir-en-Royans
- Bouvante
- Chamaloc
- Château-Bernard
- Châtelus
- Châtillon-en-Diois
- Chichilianne
- Choranche
- Clelles
- Cognin-les-Gorges
- Combovin
- Corrençon-en-Vercors
- Crest
- Die
- Échevis
- Engins
- Gigors-et-Lozeron
- Glandage
- Grenoble
- Gresse-en-Vercors
- Izeron
- La Chapelle-en-Vercors
- La Motte-Fanjas
- La Rivière
- Lans-en-Vercors
- Laval-d'Aix
- Le Chaffal
- Le Gua
- Léoncel
- Lus-la-Croix-Haute
- Malleval-en-Vercors
- Marignac-en-Diois
- Méaudre
- Miribel-Lanchâtre
- Le Monestier-du-Percy
- Montaud
- Omblèze
- Oriol-en-Royans
- Percy
- Plan-de-Baix
- Ponet-et-Saint-Auban
- Pont-en-Royans
- Presles
- Rencurel
- Rochechinard
- Romans-sur-Isère
- Romeyer
- Rovon
- Saint-Agnan-en-Vercors
- Saint-Andéol, Drôme
- Saint-Andéol, Isère
- Saint-André-en-Royans
- Saint-Gervais
- Saint-Guillaume
- Saint-Jean-en-Royans
- Saint-Julien-en-Quint
- Saint-Julien-en-Vercors
- Saint-Just-de-Claix
- Saint-Laurent-en-Royans
- Saint-Marcellin
- Saint-Martin-de-Clelles
- Saint-Martin-en-Vercors
- Saint-Martin-le-Colonel
- Saint-Michel-les-Portes
- Saint-Nazaire-en-Royans
- Saint-Nizier-du-Moucherotte
- Saint-Paul-lès-Monestier
- Saint-Pierre-de-Chérennes
- Saint-Romans
- Saint-Thomas-en-Royans
- Saint-Paul-de-Varces
- Sainte-Croix
- Sainte-Eulalie-en-Royans
- Treschenu-Creyers
- Vachères-en-Quint
- Vassieux-en-Vercors
- Villard-de-Lans
- Vinay

=== Partially affiliated ===
- Claix
- Fontaine
- Noyarey
- Saint-Quentin-sur-Isère
- Sassenage
- Seyssinet-Pariset
- Seyssins
- Varces-Allières-et-Risset
- Veurey-Voroize

== See also ==
- List of regional natural parks of France
- Maquis du Vercors
