= Marches, Drôme =

Marches
- Commune
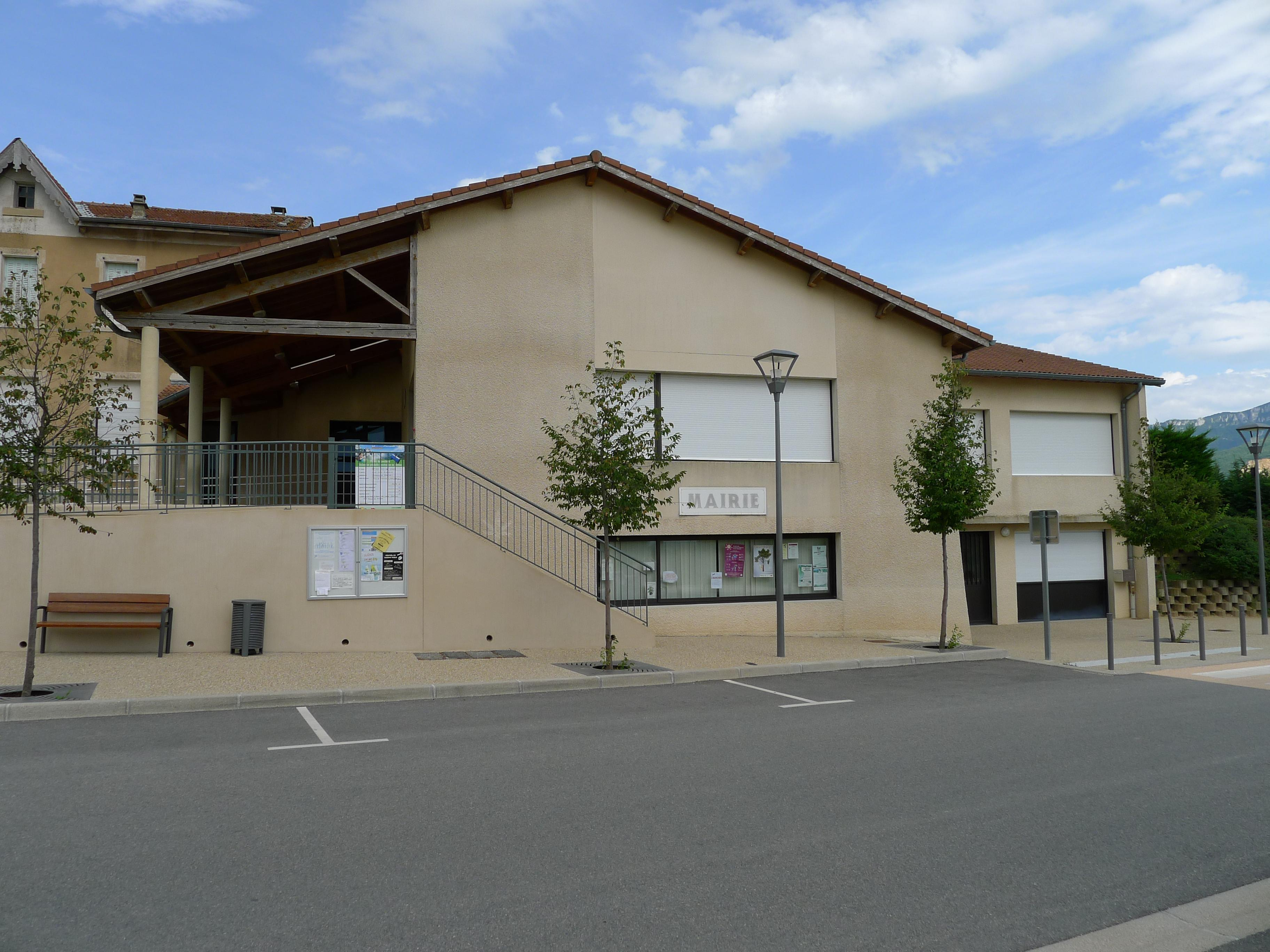
- Town hall
- Location of Marches
- Location within France Location within Auvergne-Rhône-Alpes
- Coordinates: 44°58′37″N 5°06′31″E
- Country: France
- Region: Auvergne-Rhône-Alpes
- Department: Drôme
- Arrondissement: Valence
- Canton: Vercors-Monts du Matin
- Intercommunality: CA Valence Romans Agglo

Government
  - Mayor (2020–2026): Philippe Hourdou
- Area^{1}: 11.09 km^{2} (4.28 sq mi)
- Elevation: 136 m (446 ft)
- Highest elevation: 412 m (1,352 ft)
- Lowest elevation: 249 m (817 ft)
- Population (2023): 866
  - Density: 78.1/km^{2} (202/sq mi)
- Time zone: UTC+01:00 (CET)
  - Summer (DST): UTC+02:00 (CEST)
- INSEE/Postal code: 26173 /26300
- ^{1} French Land Register data, which excludes lakes, ponds, glaciers > 1 km^{2} (0.386 sq mi or 247 acres) and river estuaries.

Marches (French pronunciation: [maʁʃ]) is a commune in the Drôme department in southeastern France.

== Population ==
Historical population
Year	Pop.	±% p.a.
1968	433	—
1975	448	+0.49%
1982	489	+1.26%
1990	560	+1.71%
1999	655	+1.76%
2007	717	+1.14%
2012	795	+2.09%
2017	836	+1.01%
2023	866	+0.59%
Source: INSEE

== See also ==
- Communes of the Drôme department
