= Pont-en-Royans =

- Commune
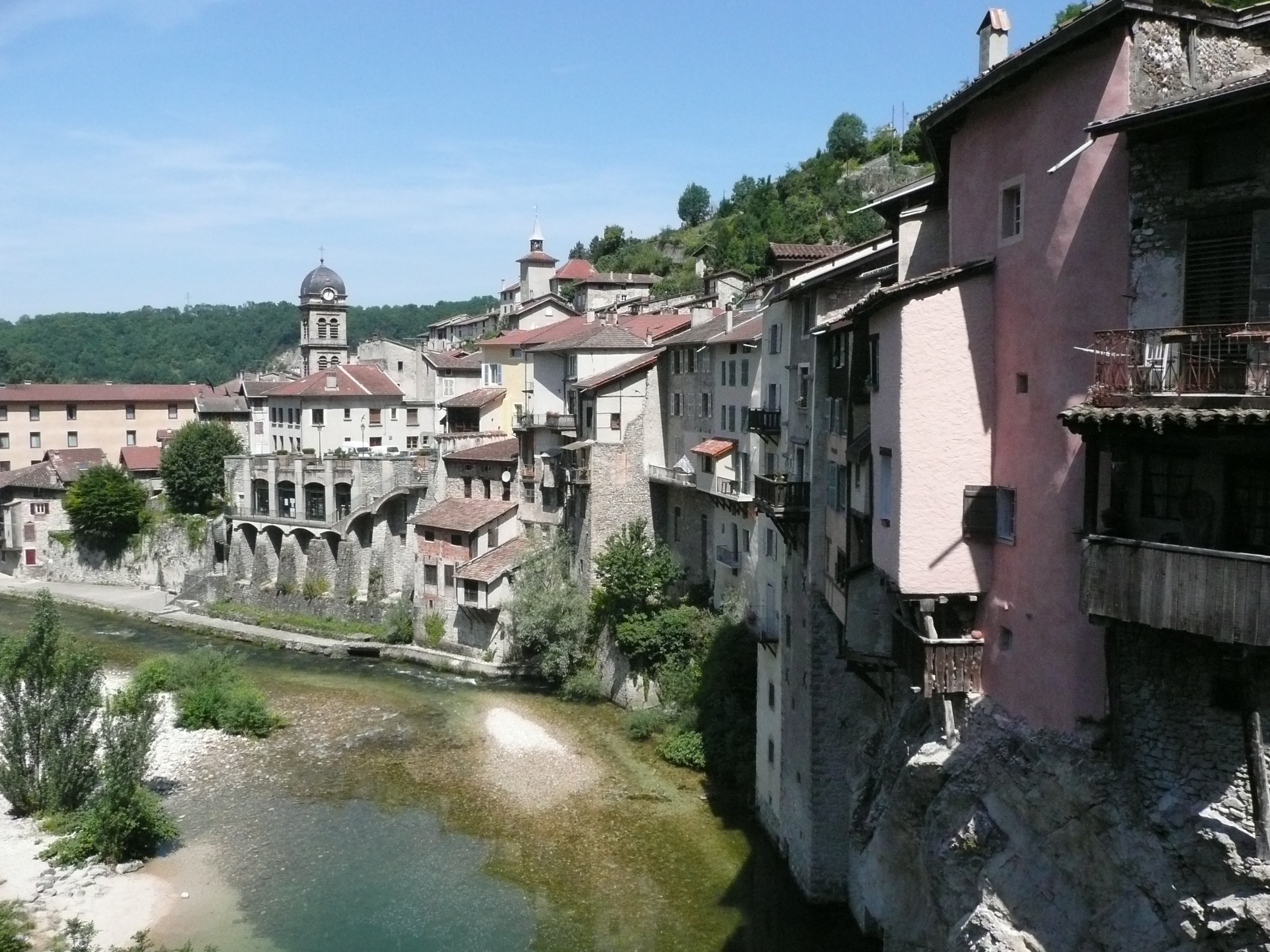
- A view of Pont-en-Royans

- Coat of arms
- Location of Pont-en-Royans
- Location within France Location within Auvergne-Rhône-Alpes
- Coordinates: 45°03′49″N 5°20′36″E
- Country: France
- Region: Auvergne-Rhône-Alpes
- Department: Isère
- Arrondissement: Grenoble
- Canton: Le Sud Grésivaudan
- Intercommunality: Saint-Marcellin Vercors Isère Communauté

Government
  - Mayor (2024–2026): Arielle Moulin Laporte
- Area^{1}: 2.9 km^{2} (1.1 sq mi)
- Elevation: 210 m (690 ft)
- Highest elevation: 788 m (2,585 ft)
- Lowest elevation: 183 m (600 ft)
- Population (2023): 805
  - Density: 280/km^{2} (720/sq mi)
- Time zone: UTC+01:00 (CET)
  - Summer (DST): UTC+02:00 (CEST)
- INSEE/Postal code: 38319 /38680
- Website: www.pontenroyans-vercors.fr
- ^{1} French Land Register data, which excludes lakes, ponds, glaciers > 1 km^{2} (0.386 sq mi or 247 acres) and river estuaries.

Pont-en-Royans (French pronunciation: [pɔ̃.t‿ɑ̃ ʁwajɑ̃]) is a commune in the Isère department in the Auvergne-Rhône-Alpes region in Southeastern France.

== Geography ==
The town is located near the Isère valley at the gates of the Vercors Regional Natural Park. It lies at the meeting of the rivers Bourne (which rises in Lans-en-Vercors) and its tributary the Vernaison (which originates in the territory of Saint-Agnan-en-Vercors). The two rivers together collect most of the waters of the Vercors. The left bank and the river after its confluence are located in the department of Drôme.

== Population ==
Historical population
Year	Pop.	±% p.a.
1968	1,132	—
1975	1,094	−0.49%
1982	1,051	−0.57%
1990	879	−2.21%
1999	917	+0.47%
2007	879	−0.53%
2012	803	−1.79%
2017	774	−0.73%
2023	805	+0.66%
Source: INSEE

== Twin towns ==
Pont-en-Royans has been twinned with Bassiano, Italy, since 1985.

== Sights ==
Today, Pont-en-Royans is a village displaying the medieval architecture of the sixteenth century and is famous for its colourful hanging houses. Its original architecture is due to an ingenious adaptation to the environment of the village to promote its trading activity with timber.

- The water museum aims to explore the water in all its forms. A bar allows water tasting of more than 900 bottled waters of the world.
- The Choranche caves lead through an underground river of stalactites. Unique amphibians (the proteas) are survivors from the time of dinosaurs.
- Circus choranche and cascading Gournier.
- Route des Gorges de la Bourne between Pont-en-Royans and Villard-de-Lans. Corbelled road carved into the rock and classified three stars in the Michelin guide. Work is being undertaken since 2008 to secure the route to the source of many accidents

== See also ==
- Communes of the Isère department
- Parc naturel régional du Vercors
