= Bouvante =

- Commune
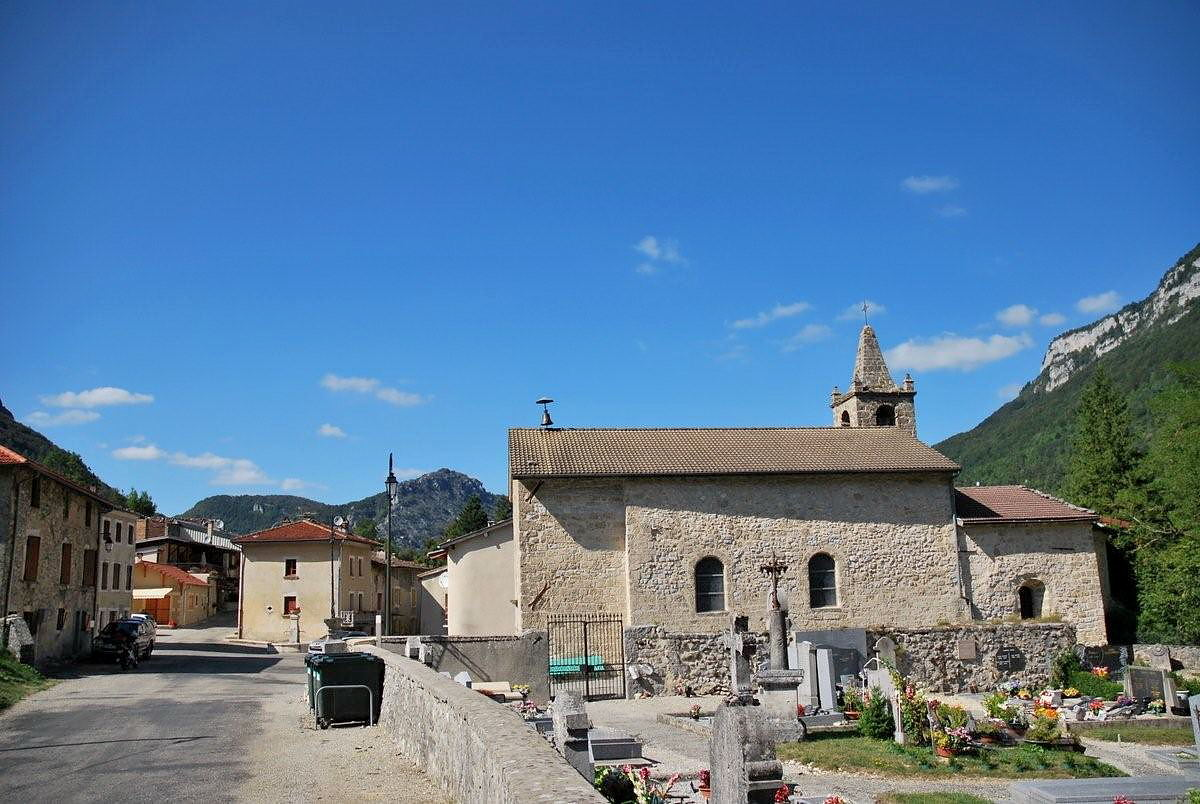
- The church in Bouvante
- Location of Bouvante
- Location within France Location within Auvergne-Rhône-Alpes
- Coordinates: 44°57′55″N 5°16′17″E
- Country: France
- Region: Auvergne-Rhône-Alpes
- Department: Drôme
- Arrondissement: Die
- Canton: Vercors-Monts du Matin

Government
  - Mayor (2020–2026): Jean-Luc Faure
- Area^{1}: 83.88 km^{2} (32.39 sq mi)
- Elevation: 585 m (1,919 ft)
- Highest elevation: 1,701 m (5,581 ft)
- Lowest elevation: 311 m (1,020 ft)
- Population (2023): 210
  - Density: 2.5/km^{2} (6.5/sq mi)
- Time zone: UTC+01:00 (CET)
  - Summer (DST): UTC+02:00 (CEST)
- INSEE/Postal code: 26059 /26190
- ^{1} French Land Register data, which excludes lakes, ponds, glaciers > 1 km^{2} (0.386 sq mi or 247 acres) and river estuaries.

Bouvante (French pronunciation: [buvɑ̃t]) is a commune in the Drôme department in southeastern France.

== Population ==
Historical population
Year	Pop.	±% p.a.
1968	250	—
1975	222	−1.68%
1982	219	−0.19%
1990	220	+0.06%
1999	223	+0.15%
2007	238	+0.82%
2012	242	+0.33%
2017	226	−1.36%
2023	210	−1.22%
Source: INSEE

== See also ==
- Communes of the Drôme department
- Parc naturel régional du Vercors
