= Barbières =

- Commune
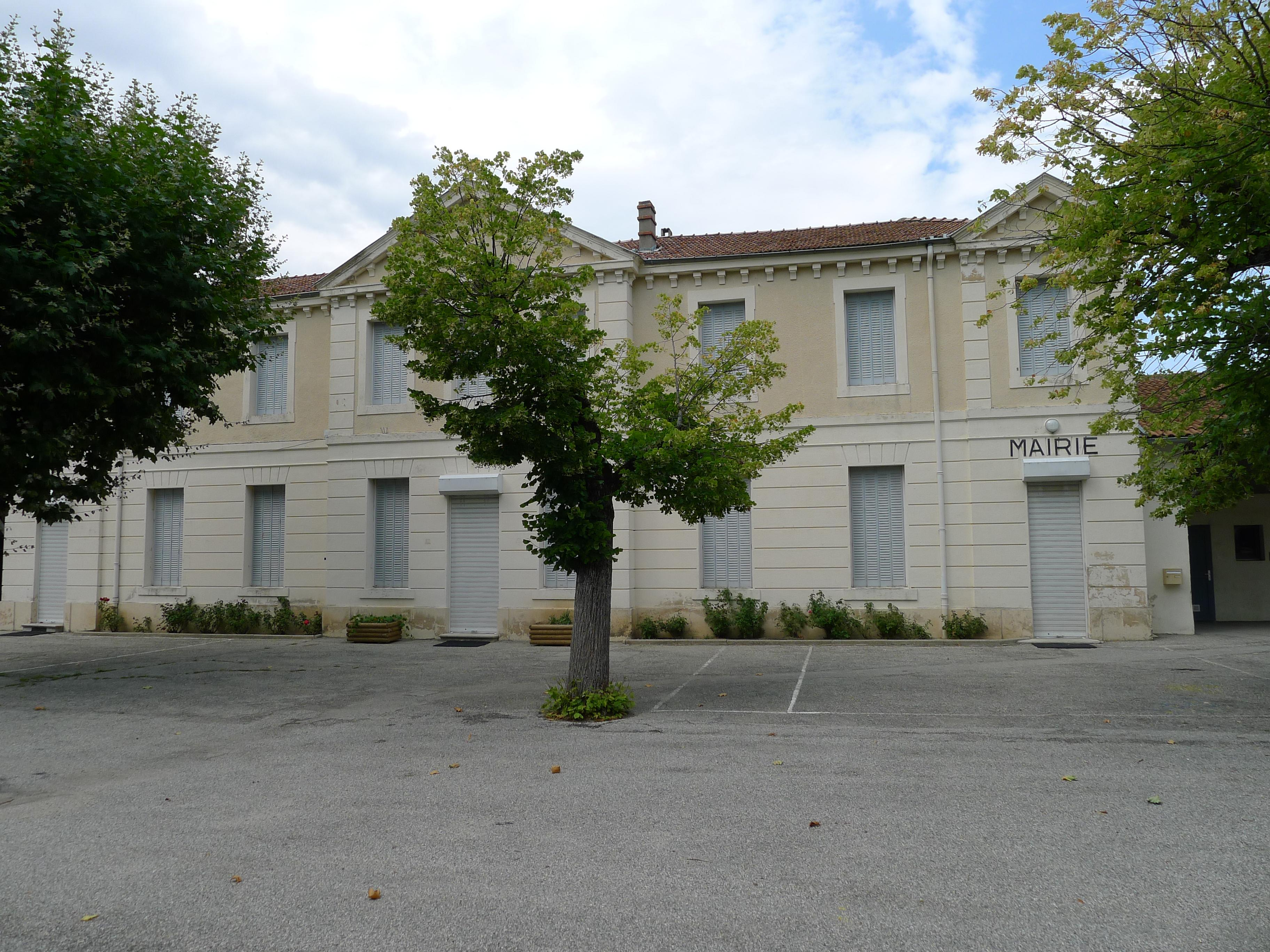
- Town hall
- Location of Barbières
- Location within France Location within Auvergne-Rhône-Alpes
- Coordinates: 44°57′26″N 5°08′29″E
- Country: France
- Region: Auvergne-Rhône-Alpes
- Department: Drôme
- Arrondissement: Valence
- Canton: Vercors-Monts du Matin
- Intercommunality: CA Valence Romans Agglo

Government
  - Mayor (2020–2026): Bernard Previeu
- Area^{1}: 14.4 km^{2} (5.6 sq mi)
- Highest elevation: 1,322 m (4,337 ft)
- Lowest elevation: 389 m (1,276 ft)
- Population (2023): 1,143
  - Density: 79.4/km^{2} (206/sq mi)
- Time zone: UTC+01:00 (CET)
  - Summer (DST): UTC+02:00 (CEST)
- INSEE/Postal code: 26023 /26300
- ^{1} French Land Register data, which excludes lakes, ponds, glaciers > 1 km^{2} (0.386 sq mi or 247 acres) and river estuaries.

Barbières (French pronunciation: [baʁbjɛʁ]; Occitan: Barbèira) is a commune in the Drôme department in southeastern France.

== Population ==
Historical population
Year	Pop.	±% p.a.
1968	519	—
1975	534	+0.41%
1982	610	+1.92%
1990	583	−0.56%
1999	647	+1.16%
2007	719	+1.33%
2012	961	+5.97%
2017	1,059	+1.96%
2023	1,143	+1.28%
Source: INSEE

== See also ==
- Communes of the Drôme department
