= Bésayes =

- Commune
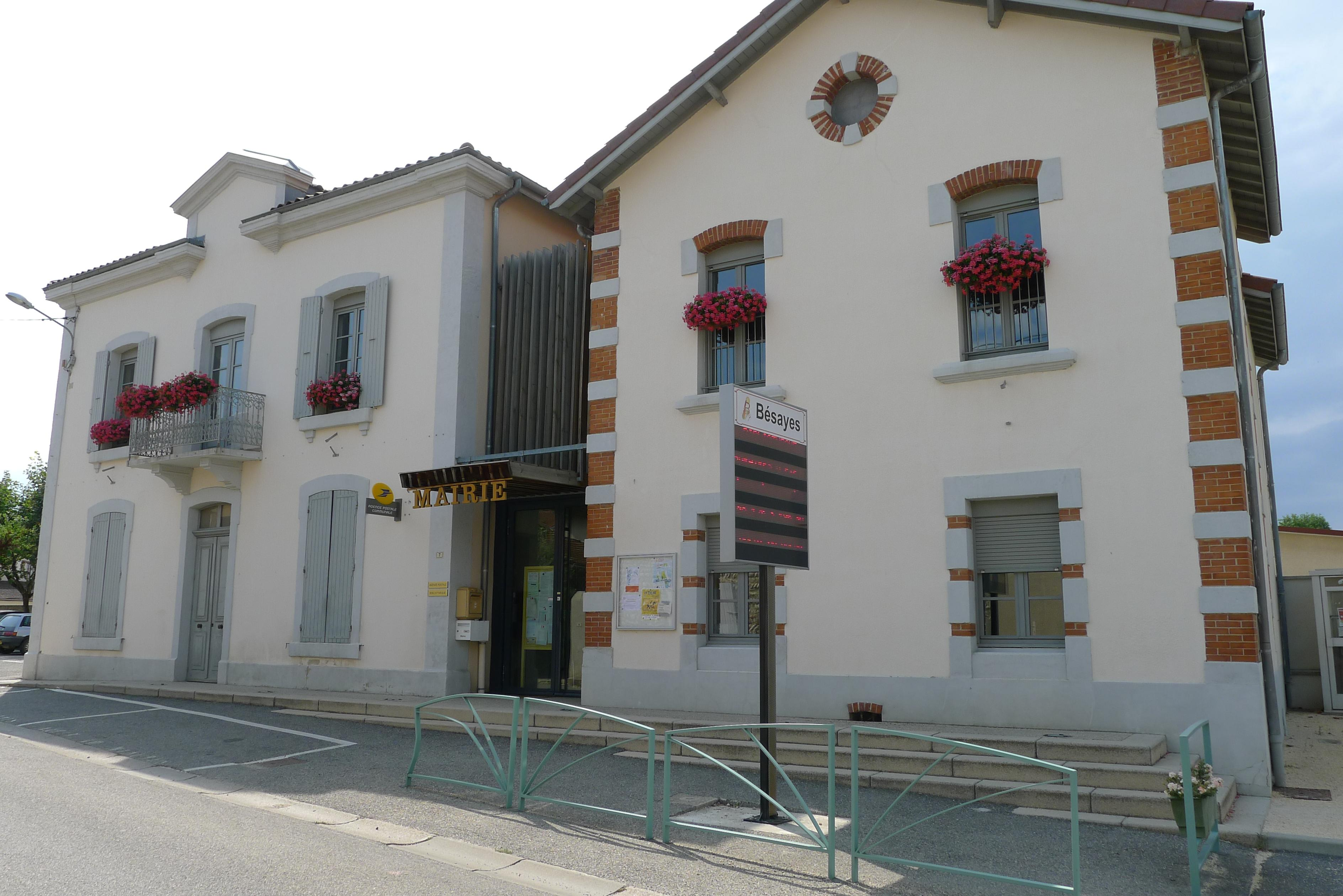
- Town hall
- Location of Bésayes
- Location within France Location within Auvergne-Rhône-Alpes
- Coordinates: 44°57′56″N 5°04′48″E
- Country: France
- Region: Auvergne-Rhône-Alpes
- Department: Drôme
- Arrondissement: Valence
- Canton: Vercors-Monts du Matin
- Intercommunality: CA Valence Romans Agglo

Government
  - Mayor (2020–2026): Nadine Manteaux
- Area^{1}: 9.53 km^{2} (3.68 sq mi)
- Elevation: 242 m (794 ft)
- Highest elevation: 408 m (1,339 ft)
- Lowest elevation: 208 m (682 ft)
- Population (2023): 1,370
  - Density: 144/km^{2} (372/sq mi)
- Time zone: UTC+01:00 (CET)
  - Summer (DST): UTC+02:00 (CEST)
- INSEE/Postal code: 26049 /26300
- ^{1} French Land Register data, which excludes lakes, ponds, glaciers > 1 km^{2} (0.386 sq mi or 247 acres) and river estuaries.

Bésayes (French pronunciation: [bezaj]; Occitan: Besaias) is a commune in the Drôme department in southeastern France.

== Population ==
Historical population
Year	Pop.	±% p.a.
1968	520	—
1975	552	+0.86%
1982	718	+3.83%
1990	762	+0.75%
1999	911	+2.00%
2007	996	+1.12%
2012	1,138	+2.70%
2017	1,221	+1.42%
2023	1,370	+1.94%
Source: INSEE

== See also ==
- Communes of the Drôme department
