= Laval-d'Aix =

- Commune
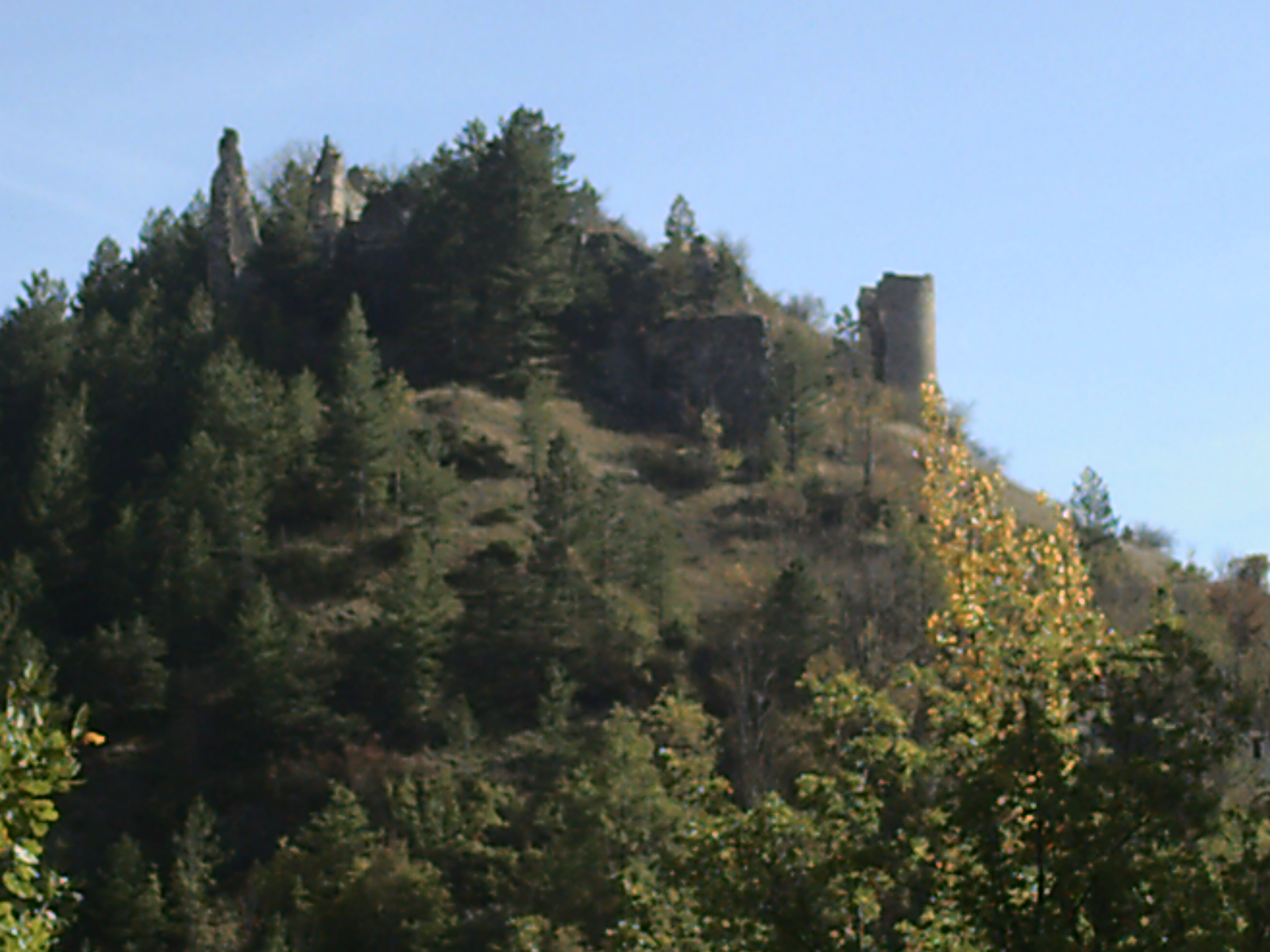
- Ruins of the chateau
- Location of Laval-d'Aix
- Location within France Location within Auvergne-Rhône-Alpes
- Coordinates: 44°42′51″N 5°25′56″E
- Country: France
- Region: Auvergne-Rhône-Alpes
- Department: Drôme
- Arrondissement: Die
- Canton: Le Diois
- Intercommunality: Diois

Government
  - Mayor (2020–2026): Christian Charrier
- Area^{1}: 20.05 km^{2} (7.74 sq mi)
- Elevation: 488 m (1,601 ft)
- Highest elevation: 2,038 m (6,686 ft)
- Lowest elevation: 433 m (1,421 ft)
- Population (2023): 112
  - Density: 5.59/km^{2} (14.5/sq mi)
- Time zone: UTC+01:00 (CET)
  - Summer (DST): UTC+02:00 (CEST)
- INSEE/Postal code: 26159 /26150
- ^{1} French Land Register data, which excludes lakes, ponds, glaciers > 1 km^{2} (0.386 sq mi or 247 acres) and river estuaries.

Laval-d'Aix (Occitan: Laval-d'Ais) is a commune in the Drôme department in southeastern France.

== Population ==
Historical population
Year	Pop.	±% p.a.
1968	69	—
1975	54	−3.44%
1982	62	+1.99%
1990	83	+3.71%
1999	89	+0.78%
2007	110	+2.68%
2012	134	+4.03%
2017	118	−2.51%
2023	112	−0.87%
Source: INSEE

== See also ==
- Communes of the Drôme department
- Parc naturel régional du Vercors
