= Communauté d'agglomération Valence Romans Agglo =

Valence Romans Agglo
- Communauté d'agglomération
- Interactive map of Valence Romans Agglo
- Coordinates: 44°58′N 5°02′E
- Country: France
- Region: Auvergne-Rhône-Alpes
- Department: Drôme
- No. of communes: {{{nbcomm}}}
- Established: 2017
- Area: 940.5 km^{2} (363.1 sq mi)
- Population (2019): 233,826
  - Density: 248.6/km^{2} (643.9/sq mi)
- Website: www.valenceromansagglo.fr

Communauté d'agglomération Valence Romans Agglo is the communauté d'agglomération, an intercommunal structure, centred on the cities of Valence and Romans-sur-Isère. It is located in the Drôme department, in the Auvergne-Rhône-Alpes region, southeastern France. It was created in January 2017 by the merger of the former Communauté d'agglomération Valence-Romans Sud Rhône-Alpes and the Communauté de communes de la Raye. Its seat is in Valence. Its area is 940.5 km^{2}. Its population was 223,826 in 2019, of which 64,749 in Valence and 33,098 in Romans-sur-Isère.

== Composition ==
The communauté d'agglomération consists of the following 54 communes:

1. Alixan
2. Barbières
3. Barcelonne
4. La Baume-Cornillane
5. La Baume-d'Hostun
6. Beaumont-lès-Valence
7. Beauregard-Baret
8. Beauvallon
9. Bésayes
10. Bourg-de-Péage
11. Bourg-lès-Valence
12. Chabeuil
13. Le Chalon
14. Charpey
15. Châteaudouble
16. Châteauneuf-sur-Isère
17. Châtillon-Saint-Jean
18. Chatuzange-le-Goubet
19. Clérieux
20. Combovin
21. Crépol
22. Étoile-sur-Rhône
23. Eymeux
24. Génissieux
25. Geyssans
26. Granges-les-Beaumont
27. Hostun
28. Jaillans
29. Malissard
30. Marches
31. Montéléger
32. Montélier
33. Montmeyran
34. Montmiral
35. Montvendre
36. Mours-Saint-Eusèbe
37. Ourches
38. Parnans
39. Peyrins
40. Peyrus
41. Portes-lès-Valence
42. Rochefort-Samson
43. Romans-sur-Isère
44. Saint-Bardoux
45. Saint-Christophe-et-le-Laris
46. Saint-Laurent-d'Onay
47. Saint-Marcel-lès-Valence
48. Saint-Michel-sur-Savasse
49. Saint-Paul-lès-Romans
50. Saint-Vincent-la-Commanderie
51. Triors
52. Upie
53. Valence
54. Valherbasse
