= Saint-Vincent-la-Commanderie =

- Commune
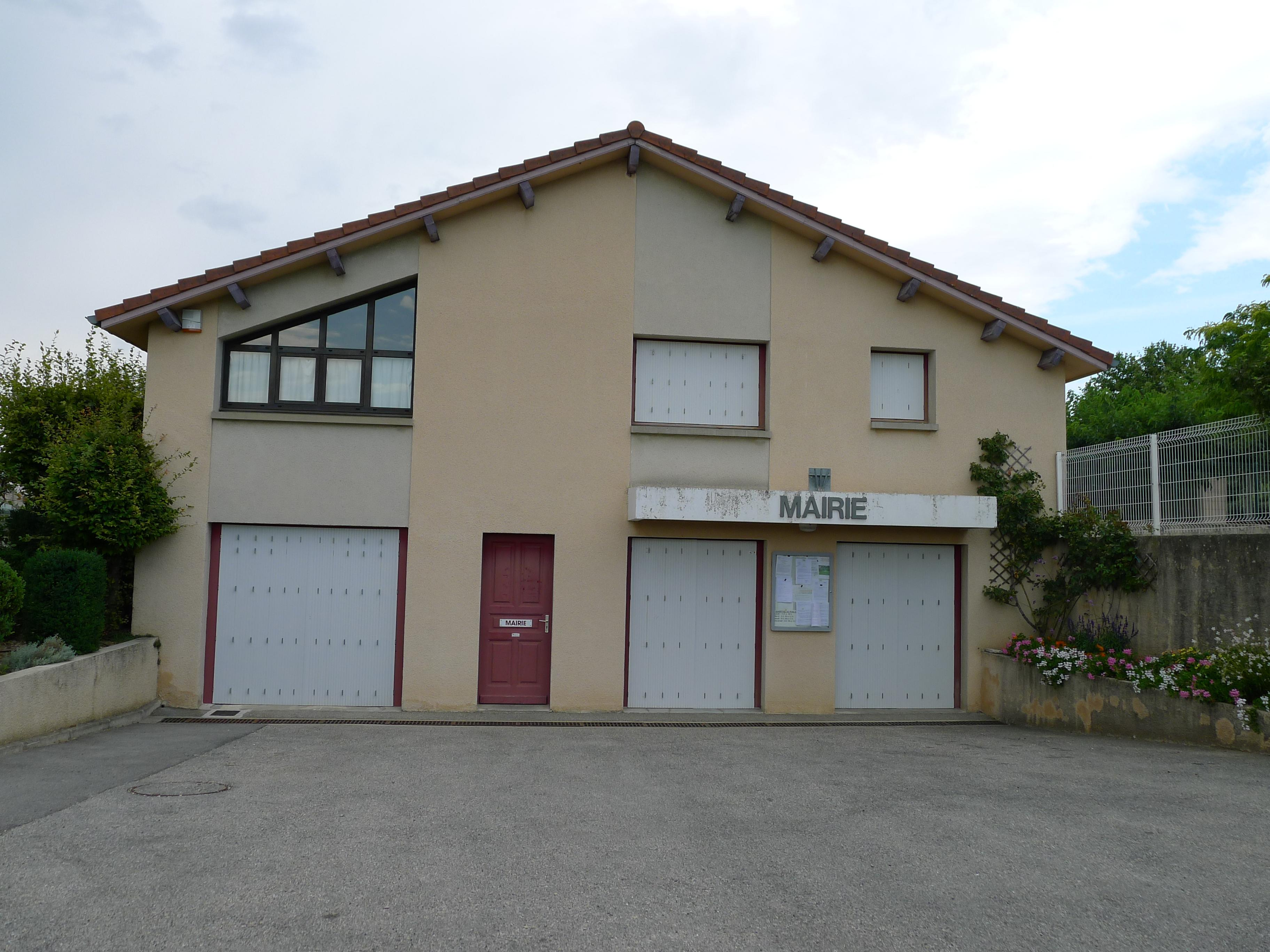
- Town hall
- Location of Saint-Vincent-la-Commanderie
- Location within France Location within Auvergne-Rhône-Alpes
- Coordinates: 44°56′20″N 5°07′08″E
- Country: France
- Region: Auvergne-Rhône-Alpes
- Department: Drôme
- Arrondissement: Valence
- Canton: Vercors-Monts du Matin
- Intercommunality: CA Valence Romans Agglo

Government
  - Mayor (2020–2026): Françoise Agrain
- Area^{1}: 13.34 km^{2} (5.15 sq mi)
- Elevation: 390 m (1,280 ft)
- Highest elevation: 1,108 m (3,635 ft)
- Lowest elevation: 326 m (1,070 ft)
- Population (2023): 636
  - Density: 47.7/km^{2} (123/sq mi)
- Time zone: UTC+01:00 (CET)
  - Summer (DST): UTC+02:00 (CEST)
- INSEE/Postal code: 26382 /26300
- ^{1} French Land Register data, which excludes lakes, ponds, glaciers > 1 km^{2} (0.386 sq mi or 247 acres) and river estuaries.

Saint-Vincent-la-Commanderie (French pronunciation: [sɛ̃ vɛ̃sɑ̃ la kɔmɑ̃dʁi]; Occitan: Sent Vincenç de Charpei) is a commune in the Drôme department in southeastern France.

== Population ==
Historical population
Year	Pop.	±% p.a.
1968	236	—
1975	213	−1.45%
1982	229	+1.04%
1990	318	+4.19%
1999	391	+2.32%
2007	412	+0.66%
2012	474	+2.84%
2017	541	+2.68%
2023	636	+2.73%
Source: INSEE

== See also ==
- Communes of the Drôme department
