= Rochechinard =

- Commune
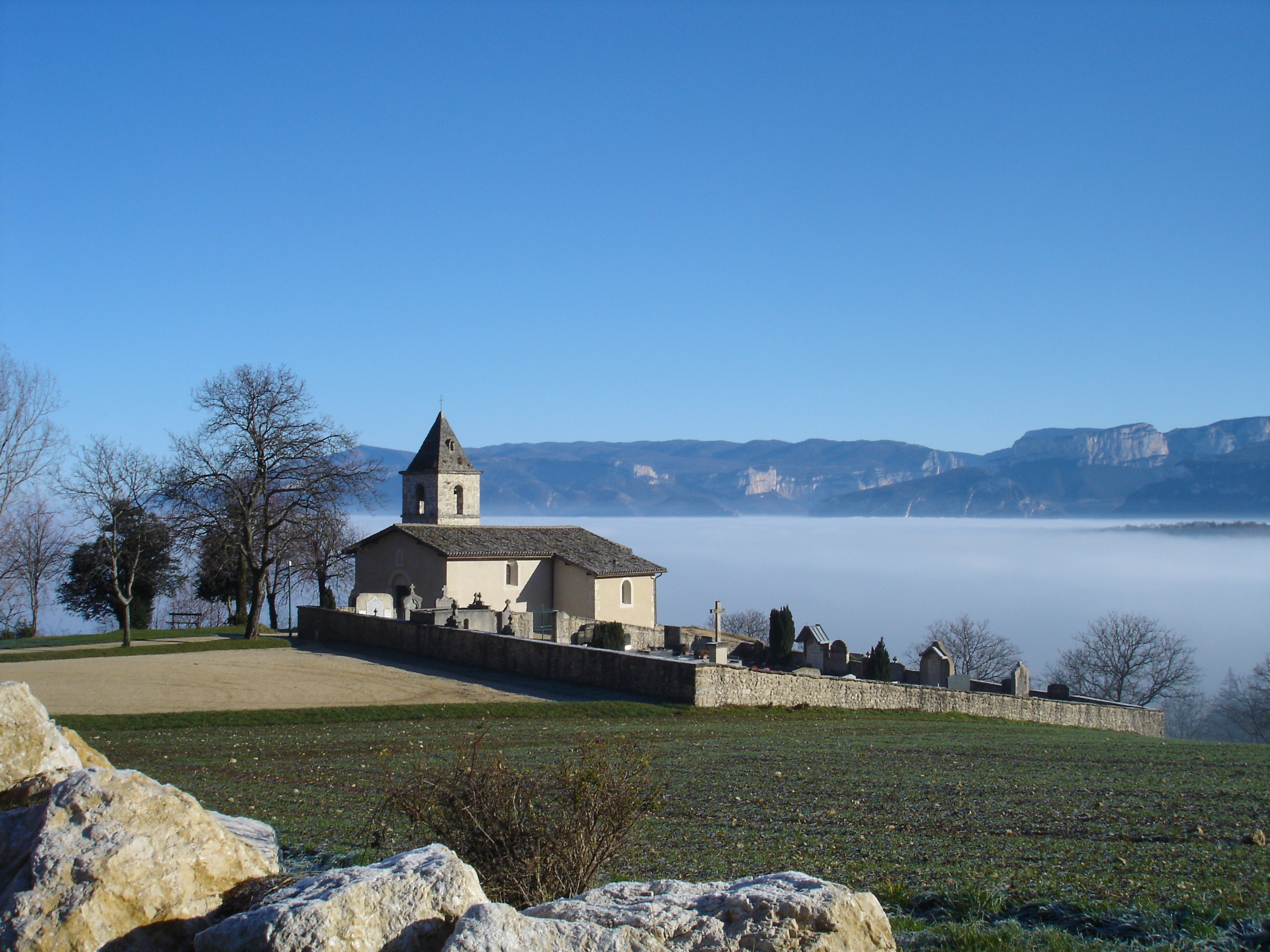
- The church of Rochechinard
- Location of Rochechinard
- Location within France Location within Auvergne-Rhône-Alpes
- Coordinates: 45°02′06″N 5°15′15″E
- Country: France
- Region: Auvergne-Rhône-Alpes
- Department: Drôme
- Arrondissement: Die
- Canton: Vercors-Monts du Matin

Government
  - Mayor (2020–2026): Claude Antelme
- Area^{1}: 9.78 km^{2} (3.78 sq mi)
- Elevation: 386 m (1,266 ft)
- Highest elevation: 1,246 m (4,088 ft)
- Lowest elevation: 235 m (771 ft)
- Population (2023): 131
  - Density: 13.4/km^{2} (34.7/sq mi)
- Time zone: UTC+01:00 (CET)
  - Summer (DST): UTC+02:00 (CEST)
- INSEE/Postal code: 26270 /26190
- ^{1} French Land Register data, which excludes lakes, ponds, glaciers > 1 km^{2} (0.386 sq mi or 247 acres) and river estuaries.

Rochechinard (French pronunciation: [ʁɔʃ.ʃinaʁ]; Occitan: Ròchachinard) is a commune in the Drôme department in southeastern France.

== Population ==
Historical population
Year	Pop.	±% p.a.
1968	101	—
1975	103	+0.28%
1982	107	+0.55%
1990	118	+1.23%
1999	113	−0.48%
2007	102	−1.27%
2012	104	+0.39%
2017	120	+2.90%
2023	131	+1.47%
Source: INSEE

== See also ==
- Communes of the Drôme department
- Parc naturel régional du Vercors
