= Rochefort-Samson =

- Commune
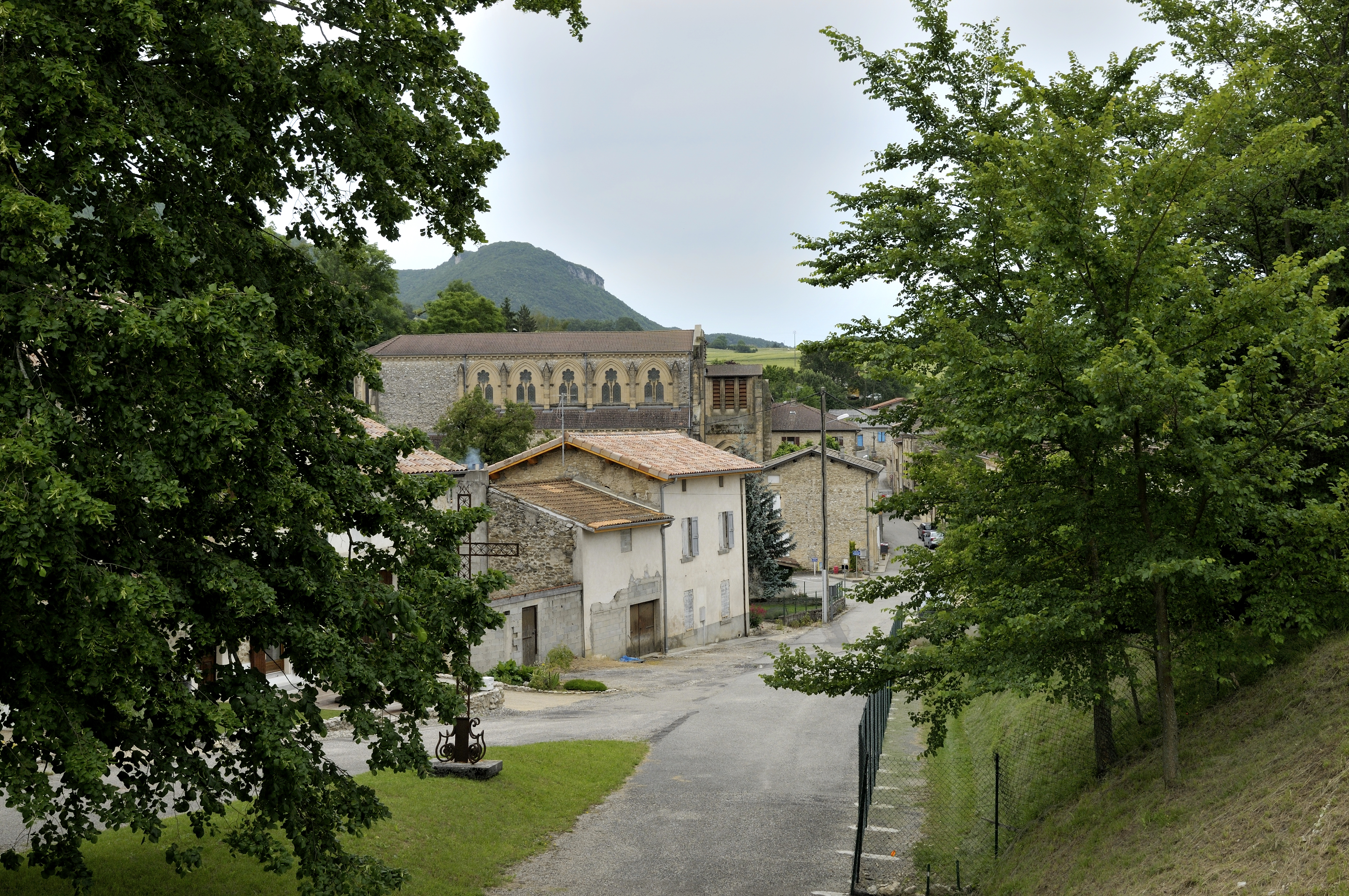
- The village of Rochefort-Samson
- Location of Rochefort-Samson
- Location within France Location within Auvergne-Rhône-Alpes
- Coordinates: 44°58′26″N 5°09′09″E
- Country: France
- Region: Auvergne-Rhône-Alpes
- Department: Drôme
- Arrondissement: Valence
- Canton: Vercors-Monts du Matin
- Intercommunality: CA Valence Romans Agglo

Government
  - Mayor (2020–2026): Danielle Clement
- Area^{1}: 24.59 km^{2} (9.49 sq mi)
- Elevation: 440 m (1,440 ft)
- Highest elevation: 1,330 m (4,360 ft)
- Lowest elevation: 227 m (745 ft)
- Population (2023): 1,084
  - Density: 44.08/km^{2} (114.2/sq mi)
- Time zone: UTC+01:00 (CET)
  - Summer (DST): UTC+02:00 (CEST)
- INSEE/Postal code: 26273 /26300
- ^{1} French Land Register data, which excludes lakes, ponds, glaciers > 1 km^{2} (0.386 sq mi or 247 acres) and river estuaries.

Rochefort-Samson (French pronunciation: [ʁɔʃfɔʁ sɑ̃sɔ̃]) is a commune in the Drôme department in southeastern France.

== Population ==
Historical population
| Year | Pop. | ±% p.a. |
|---|---|---|
| 1968 | 443 | — |
| 1975 | 432 | −0.36% |
| 1982 | 539 | +3.21% |
| 1990 | 744 | +4.11% |
| 1999 | 762 | +0.27% |
| 2007 | 930 | +2.52% |
| 2012 | 980 | +1.05% |
| 2017 | 1,007 | +0.55% |
| 2023 | 1,084 | +1.24% |
Source: INSEE

== See also ==
- Communes of the Drôme department
