= Saint-Julien-en-Quint =

- Commune
- Location of Saint-Julien-en-Quint
- Location within France Location within Auvergne-Rhône-Alpes
- Coordinates: 44°50′17″N 5°17′31″E
- Country: France
- Region: Auvergne-Rhône-Alpes
- Department: Drôme
- Arrondissement: Die
- Canton: Le Diois
- Intercommunality: Diois

Government
  - Mayor (2020–2026): Michel Tuz
- Area^{1}: 47.35 km^{2} (18.28 sq mi)
- Elevation: 565 m (1,854 ft)
- Highest elevation: 1,692 m (5,551 ft)
- Lowest elevation: 498 m (1,634 ft)
- Population (2023): 171
  - Density: 3.61/km^{2} (9.35/sq mi)
- Time zone: UTC+01:00 (CET)
  - Summer (DST): UTC+02:00 (CEST)
- INSEE/Postal code: 26308 /26150
- ^{1} French Land Register data, which excludes lakes, ponds, glaciers > 1 km^{2} (0.386 sq mi or 247 acres) and river estuaries.

Saint-Julien-en-Quint (French pronunciation: [sɛ̃ ʒyljɛ̃ ɑ̃ kɛ̃]; Vivaro-Alpine: Sant Julian de Quint) is a commune in the Drôme department located in southeastern France.

== Population ==
Historical population
Year	Pop.	±% p.a.
1968	194	—
1975	150	−3.61%
1982	144	−0.58%
1990	162	+1.48%
1999	142	−1.45%
2007	131	−1.00%
2012	157	+3.69%
2017	153	−0.51%
2023	171	+1.87%
Source: INSEE

== See also ==
- Communes of the Drôme department
- Parc naturel régional du Vercors
