= Saint-Thomas-en-Royans =

- Commune
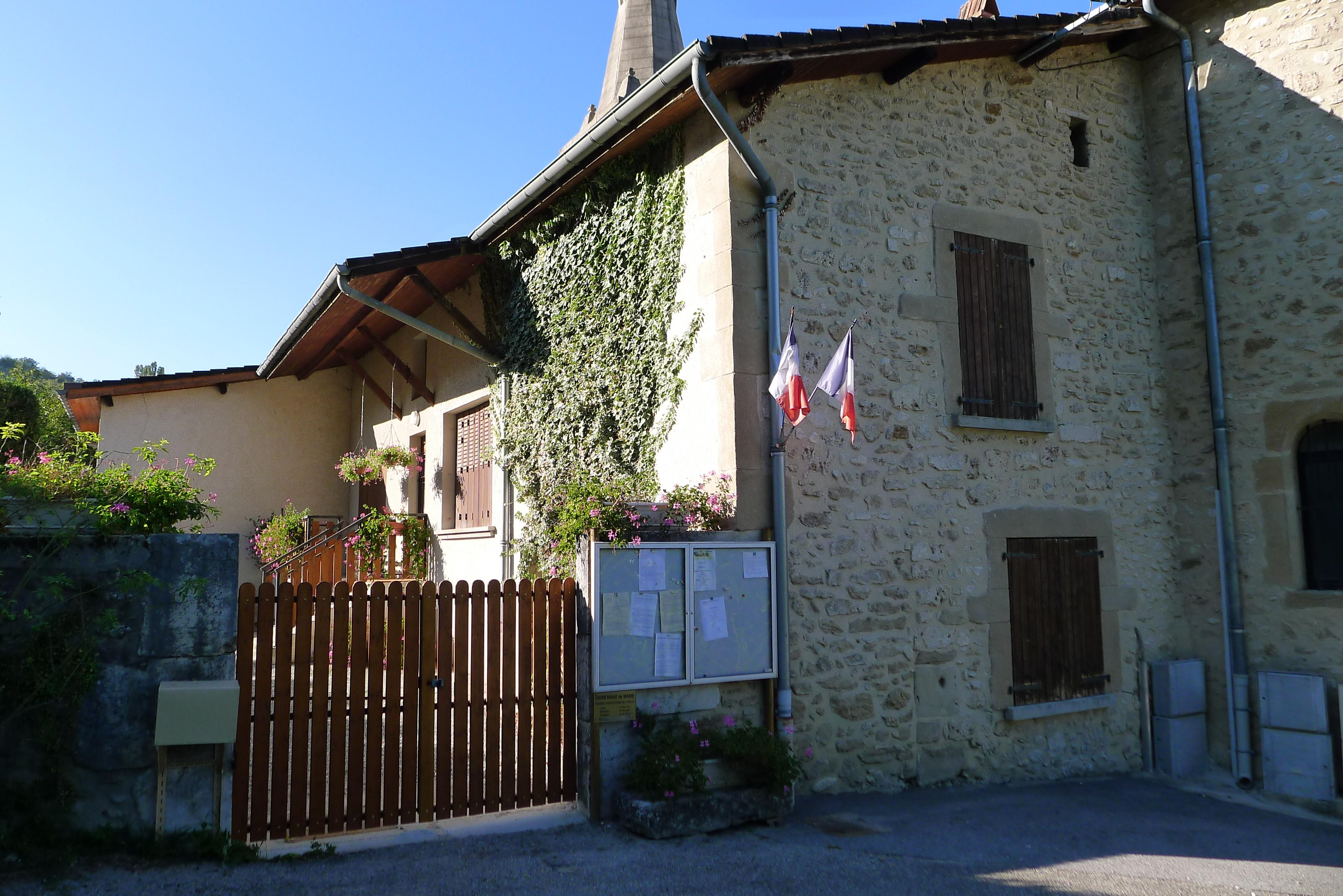
- Town hall
- Location of Saint-Thomas-en-Royans
- Location within France Location within Auvergne-Rhône-Alpes
- Coordinates: 45°03′N 5°17′E
- Country: France
- Region: Auvergne-Rhône-Alpes
- Department: Drôme
- Arrondissement: Die
- Canton: Vercors-Monts du Matin

Government
  - Mayor (2020–2026): Valéry Friol
- Area^{1}: 5.15 km^{2} (1.99 sq mi)
- Elevation: 210 m (690 ft)
- Highest elevation: 390 m (1,280 ft)
- Lowest elevation: 164 m (538 ft)
- Population (2023): 569
  - Density: 110/km^{2} (286/sq mi)
- Time zone: UTC+01:00 (CET)
  - Summer (DST): UTC+02:00 (CEST)
- INSEE/Postal code: 26331 /26190
- ^{1} French Land Register data, which excludes lakes, ponds, glaciers > 1 km^{2} (0.386 sq mi or 247 acres) and river estuaries.

Saint-Thomas-en-Royans (French pronunciation: [sɛ̃ tɔma ɑ̃ ʁwajɑ̃]; Vivaro-Alpine: Sant Tomàs de Roians) is a commune in the Drôme department in southeastern France.

== Population ==
Historical population
Year	Pop.	±% p.a.
1968	216	—
1975	230	+0.90%
1982	328	+5.20%
1990	440	+3.74%
1999	476	+0.88%
2007	504	+0.72%
2012	560	+2.13%
2017	596	+1.25%
2023	569	−0.77%
Source: INSEE

== See also ==
- Communes of the Drôme department
- Parc naturel régional du Vercors
