= Saint-Martin-le-Colonel =

- Commune
- Location of Saint-Martin-le-Colonel
- Location within France Location within Auvergne-Rhône-Alpes
- Coordinates: 44°59′13″N 5°16′23″E
- Country: France
- Region: Auvergne-Rhône-Alpes
- Department: Drôme
- Arrondissement: Die
- Canton: Vercors-Monts du Matin

Government
  - Mayor (2020–2026): Henri Bouchet
- Area^{1}: 3.18 km^{2} (1.23 sq mi)
- Elevation: 328 m (1,076 ft)
- Highest elevation: 1,000 m (3,300 ft)
- Lowest elevation: 259 m (850 ft)
- Population (2023): 224
  - Density: 70.4/km^{2} (182/sq mi)
- Time zone: UTC+01:00 (CET)
  - Summer (DST): UTC+02:00 (CEST)
- INSEE/Postal code: 26316 /26190
- ^{1} French Land Register data, which excludes lakes, ponds, glaciers > 1 km^{2} (0.386 sq mi or 247 acres) and river estuaries.

Saint-Martin-le-Colonel (French pronunciation: [sɛ̃ maʁtɛ̃ lə kɔlɔnɛl]; Occitan: Sant Martin lo Coronel) is a commune in the Drôme department in southeastern France.

== Population ==
Historical population
Year	Pop.	±% p.a.
1968	125	—
1975	100	−3.14%
1982	108	+1.11%
1990	145	+3.75%
1999	163	+1.31%
2007	186	+1.66%
2012	155	−3.58%
2017	192	+4.37%
2023	224	+2.60%
Source: INSEE

== See also ==
- Communes of the Drôme department
- Parc naturel régional du Vercors
