= La Motte-Fanjas =

- Commune
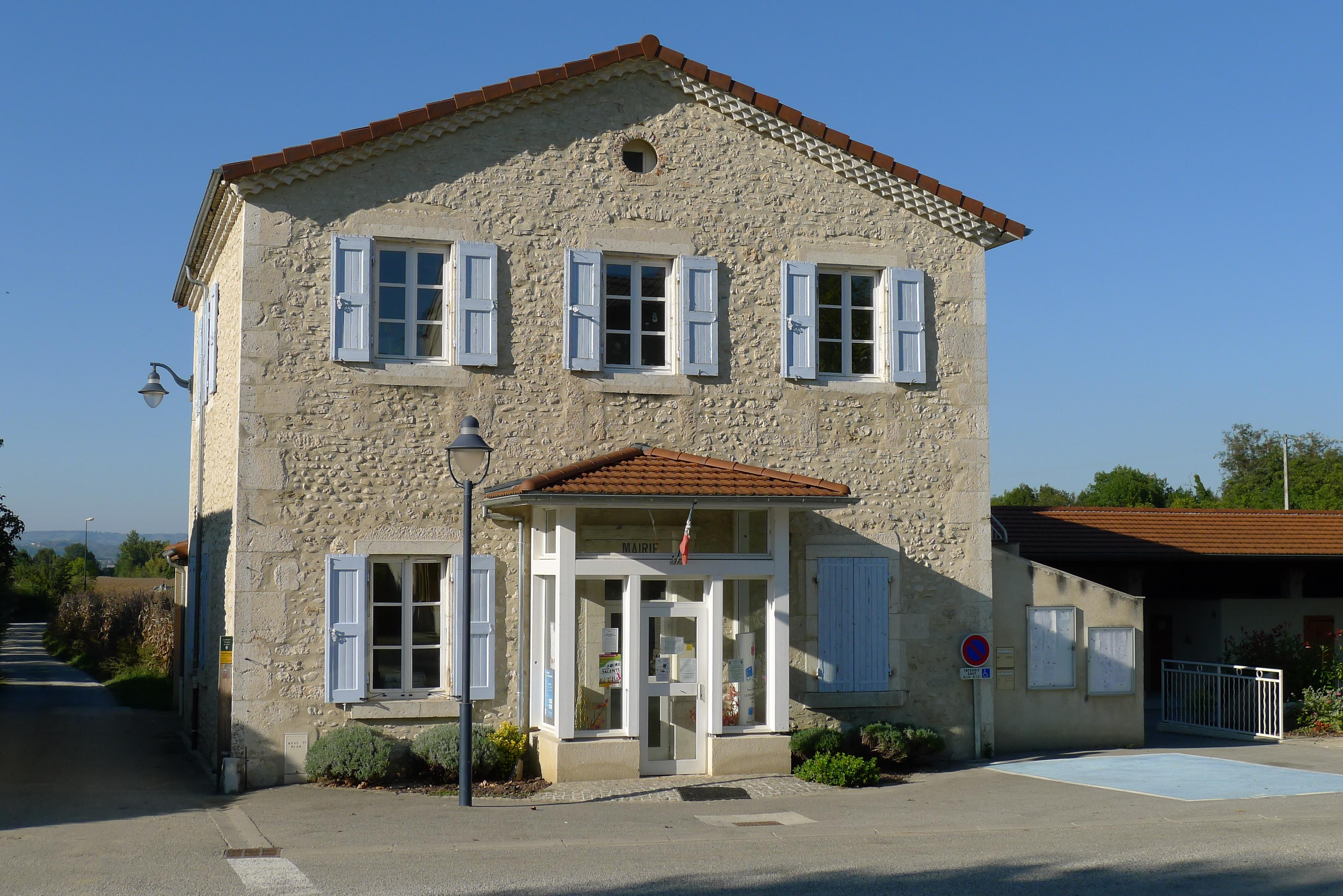
- The town hall of La Motte-Fanjas
- Location of La Motte-Fanjas
- Location within France Location within Auvergne-Rhône-Alpes
- Coordinates: 45°03′06″N 5°16′05″E
- Country: France
- Region: Auvergne-Rhône-Alpes
- Department: Drôme
- Arrondissement: Die
- Canton: Vercors-Monts du Matin

Government
  - Mayor (2020–2026): Nicolas Peyretout
- Area^{1}: 4.78 km^{2} (1.85 sq mi)
- Elevation: 242 m (794 ft)
- Highest elevation: 448 m (1,470 ft)
- Lowest elevation: 161 m (528 ft)
- Population (2023): 198
  - Density: 41.4/km^{2} (107/sq mi)
- Time zone: UTC+01:00 (CET)
  - Summer (DST): UTC+02:00 (CEST)
- INSEE/Postal code: 26217 /26190
- ^{1} French Land Register data, which excludes lakes, ponds, glaciers > 1 km^{2} (0.386 sq mi or 247 acres) and river estuaries.

La Motte-Fanjas is a commune in the Drôme department in southeastern France.

== Population ==
Historical population
| Year | Pop. | ±% p.a. |
|---|---|---|
| 1968 | 118 | — |
| 1975 | 113 | −0.62% |
| 1982 | 121 | +0.98% |
| 1990 | 115 | −0.63% |
| 1999 | 138 | +2.05% |
| 2007 | 173 | +2.87% |
| 2012 | 158 | −1.80% |
| 2017 | 193 | +4.08% |
| 2023 | 198 | +0.43% |
Source: INSEE

== See also ==
- Communes of the Drôme department
- Parc naturel régional du Vercors
