= Léoncel =

- Commune
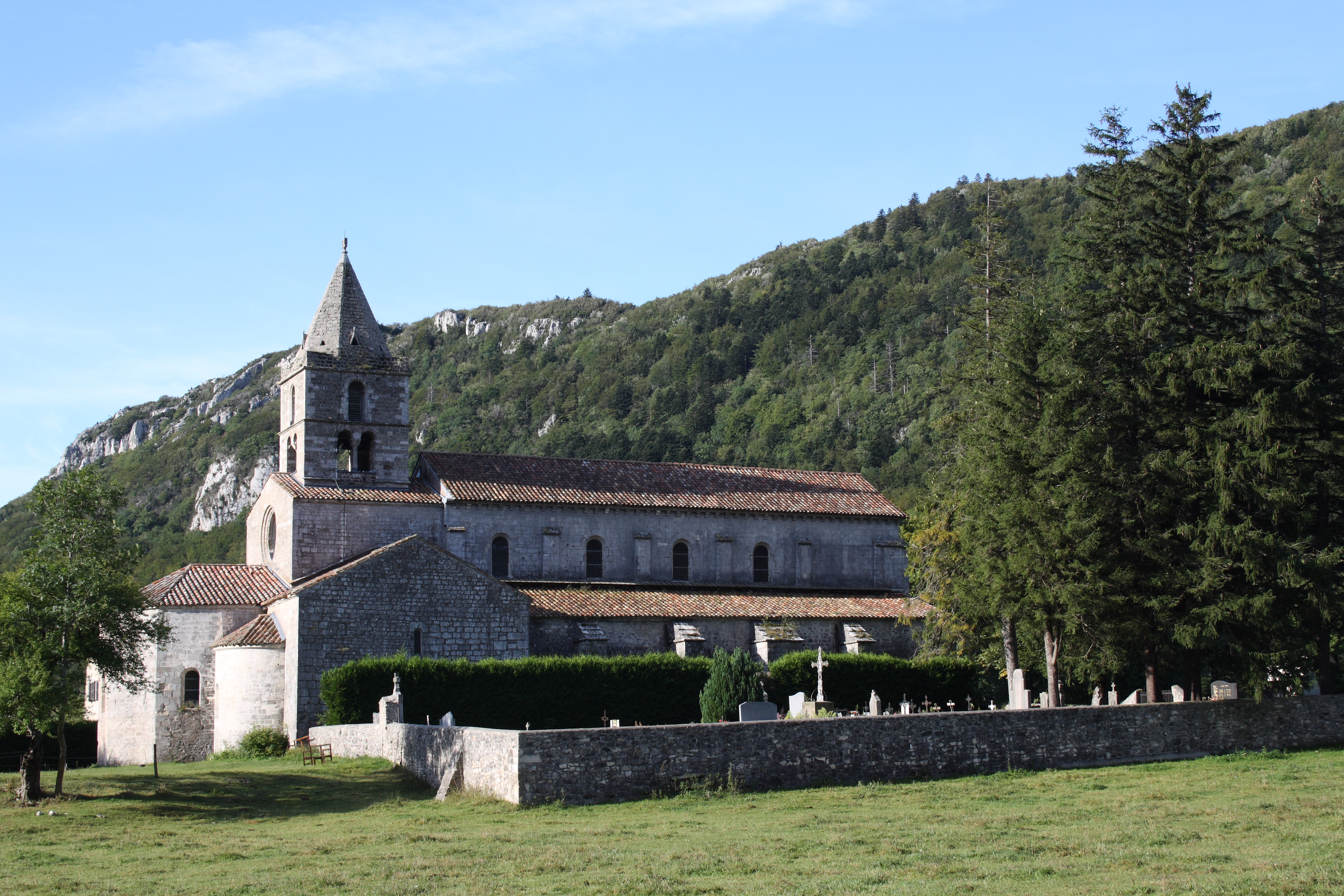
- Church of the Abbey of Léoncel
- Location of Léoncel
- Location within France Location within Auvergne-Rhône-Alpes
- Coordinates: 44°54′41″N 5°11′37″E
- Country: France
- Region: Auvergne-Rhône-Alpes
- Department: Drôme
- Arrondissement: Die
- Canton: Vercors-Monts du Matin

Government
  - Mayor (2020–2026): Jacqueline Charve
- Area^{1}: 43.01 km^{2} (16.61 sq mi)
- Elevation: 913 m (2,995 ft)
- Highest elevation: 1,447 m (4,747 ft)
- Lowest elevation: 438 m (1,437 ft)
- Population (2023): 46
  - Density: 1.1/km^{2} (2.8/sq mi)
- Time zone: UTC+01:00 (CET)
  - Summer (DST): UTC+02:00 (CEST)
- INSEE/Postal code: 26163 /26190
- ^{1} French Land Register data, which excludes lakes, ponds, glaciers > 1 km^{2} (0.386 sq mi or 247 acres) and river estuaries.

Léoncel (French pronunciation: [leɔ̃sɛl]; Occitan: Lioncèl) is a commune in the Drôme department in southeastern France.

== Population ==
Historical population
| Year | Pop. | ±% p.a. |
|---|---|---|
| 1968 | 87 | — |
| 1975 | 83 | −0.67% |
| 1982 | 73 | −1.82% |
| 1990 | 67 | −1.07% |
| 1999 | 55 | −2.17% |
| 2007 | 47 | −1.95% |
| 2012 | 64 | +6.37% |
| 2017 | 51 | −4.44% |
| 2023 | 46 | −1.71% |
Source: INSEE

== See also ==
- Communes of the Drôme department
- Parc naturel régional du Vercors
