= Chatuzange-le-Goubet =

- Commune
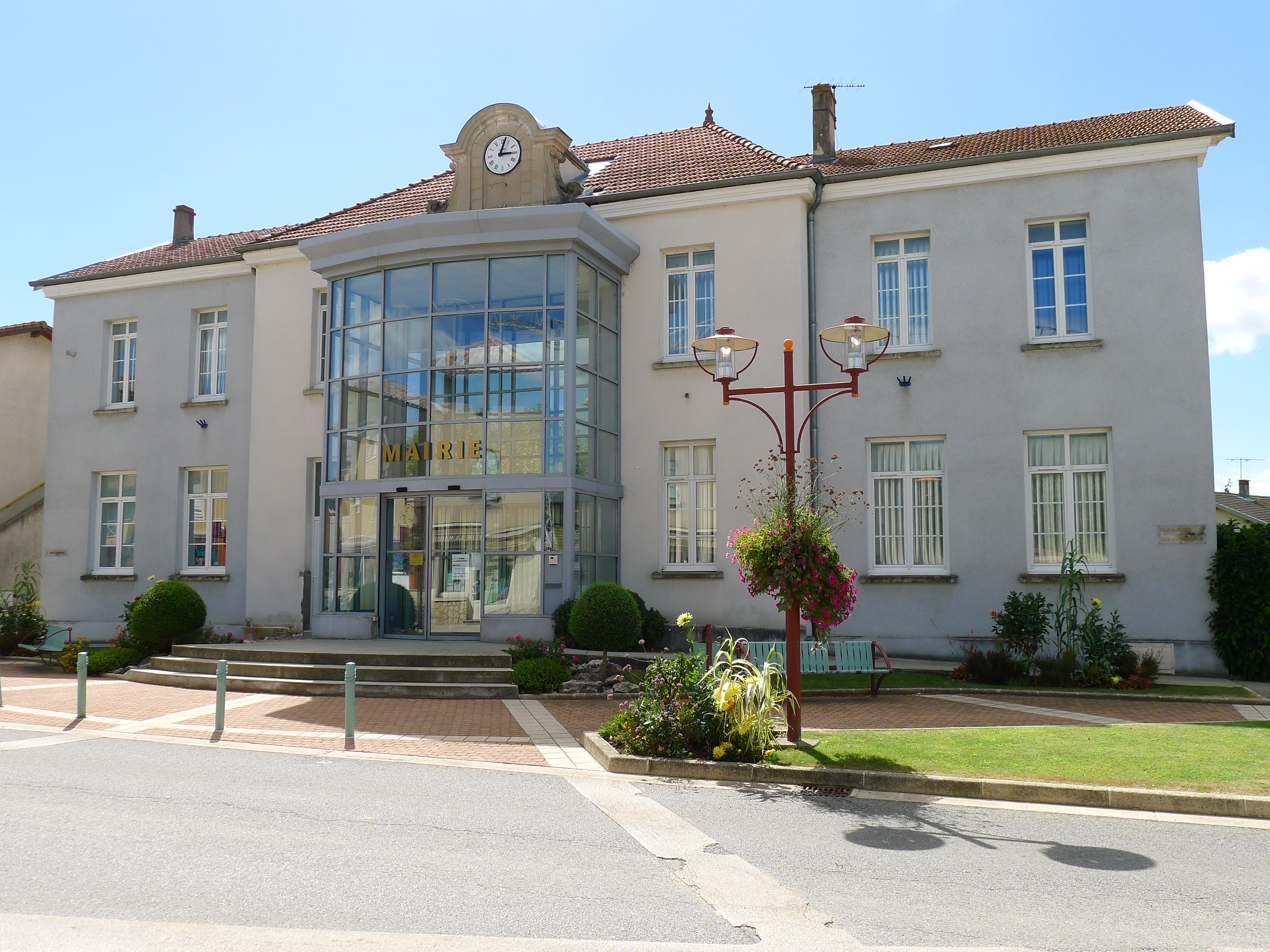
- Town hall
- Location of Chatuzange-le-Goubet
- Location within France Location within Auvergne-Rhône-Alpes
- Coordinates: 45°00′28″N 5°05′29″E
- Country: France
- Region: Auvergne-Rhône-Alpes
- Department: Drôme
- Arrondissement: Valence
- Canton: Vercors-Monts du Matin
- Intercommunality: CA Valence Romans Agglo

Government
  - Mayor (2020–2026): Christian Gauthier
- Area^{1}: 28.24 km^{2} (10.90 sq mi)
- Highest elevation: 327 m (1,073 ft)
- Lowest elevation: 150 m (490 ft)
- Population (2023): 6,523
  - Density: 231.0/km^{2} (598.2/sq mi)
- Time zone: UTC+01:00 (CET)
  - Summer (DST): UTC+02:00 (CEST)
- INSEE/Postal code: 26088 /26300
- ^{1} French Land Register data, which excludes lakes, ponds, glaciers > 1 km^{2} (0.386 sq mi or 247 acres) and river estuaries.

Chatuzange-le-Goubet (French pronunciation: [ʃatyzɑ̃ʒ lə ɡubɛ]; Vivaro-Alpine: Chatusange e los Gobets) is a commune in the Drôme department in southeastern France. A hoard of Roman silver objects was found in the commune in the nineteenth century. Known as the Chatuzange Treasure, it can now be seen in the British Museum.

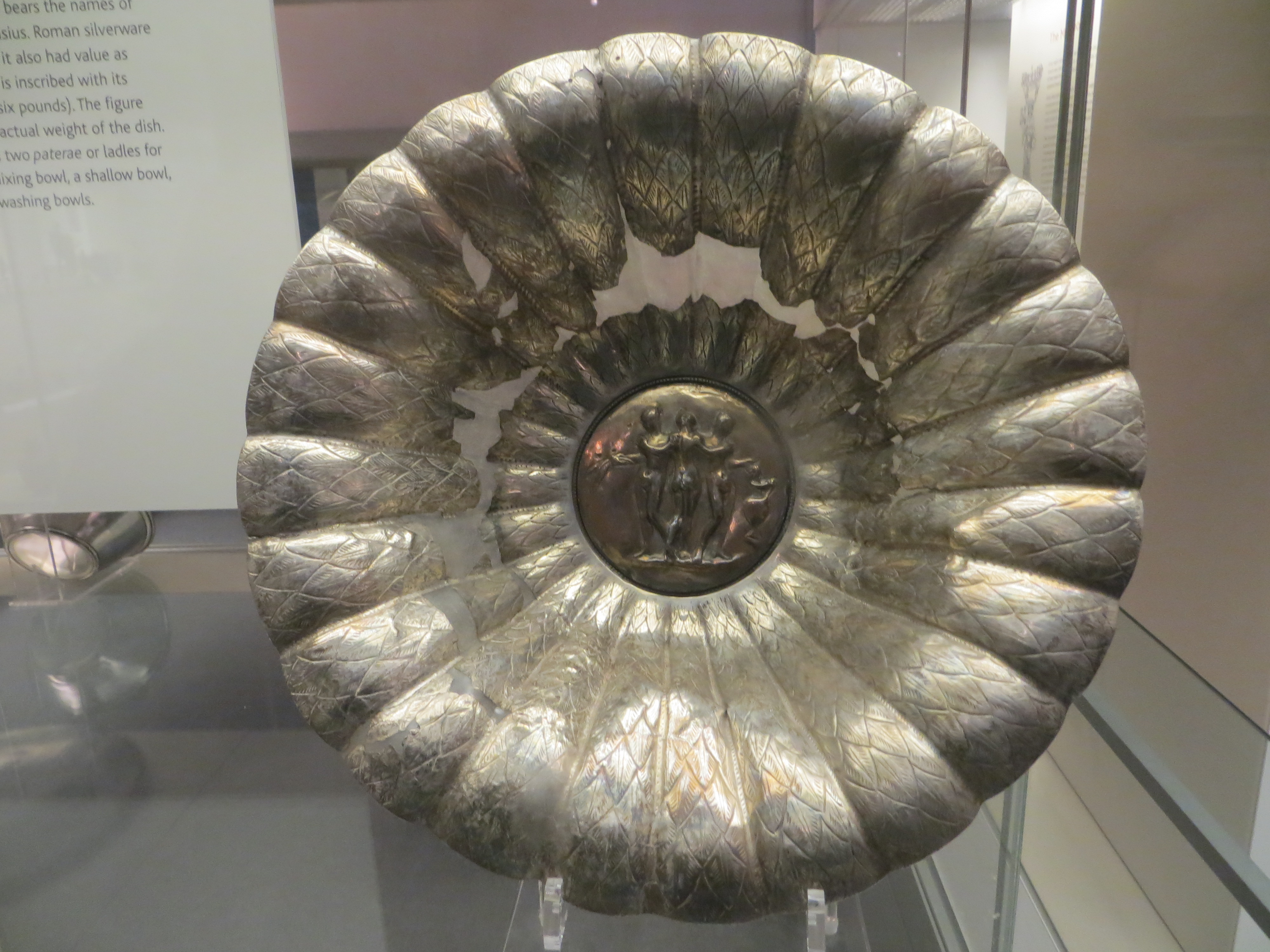
A fluted dish from the Chatuzange Treasure in the British Museum

== Population ==
Historical population

Year	Pop.	±% p.a.
1911	1,440	—
1962	1,622	+0.23%
1968	1,777	+1.53%
1975	1,875	+0.77%
1982	2,554	+4.51%
1990	3,619	+4.45%

Year	Pop.	±% p.a.
1999	3,975	+1.05%
2007	4,561	+1.73%
2012	4,989	+1.81%
2017	5,516	+2.03%
2023	6,523	+2.83%

Source: EHESS and INSEE (1968–2023)

== See also ==
- Communes of the Drôme department
