= Eymeux =

- Commune
- Location of Eymeux
- Location within France Location within Auvergne-Rhône-Alpes
- Coordinates: 45°04′44″N 5°10′45″E
- Country: France
- Region: Auvergne-Rhône-Alpes
- Department: Drôme
- Arrondissement: Valence
- Canton: Vercors-Monts du Matin
- Intercommunality: CA Valence Romans Agglo

Government
  - Mayor (2020–2026): Fabrice Bar
- Area^{1}: 9.88 km^{2} (3.81 sq mi)
- Highest elevation: 214 m (702 ft)
- Lowest elevation: 140 m (460 ft)
- Population (2023): 1,097
  - Density: 111/km^{2} (288/sq mi)
- Time zone: UTC+01:00 (CET)
  - Summer (DST): UTC+02:00 (CEST)
- INSEE/Postal code: 26129 /26730
- ^{1} French Land Register data, which excludes lakes, ponds, glaciers > 1 km^{2} (0.386 sq mi or 247 acres) and river estuaries.

Eymeux (French pronunciation: [ɛmø]; Occitan: Aimue) is a commune in the Drôme department in the Auvergne-Rhône-Alpes region in southeastern France.

== Population ==
Historical population
Year	Pop.	±% p.a.
1968	426	—
1975	411	−0.51%
1982	475	+2.09%
1990	510	+0.89%
1999	573	+1.30%
2007	879	+5.49%
2012	1,074	+4.09%
2017	1,024	−0.95%
2023	1,097	+1.15%
Source: INSEE

== See also ==
- Communes of the Drôme department
