= La Baume-d'Hostun =

- Commune
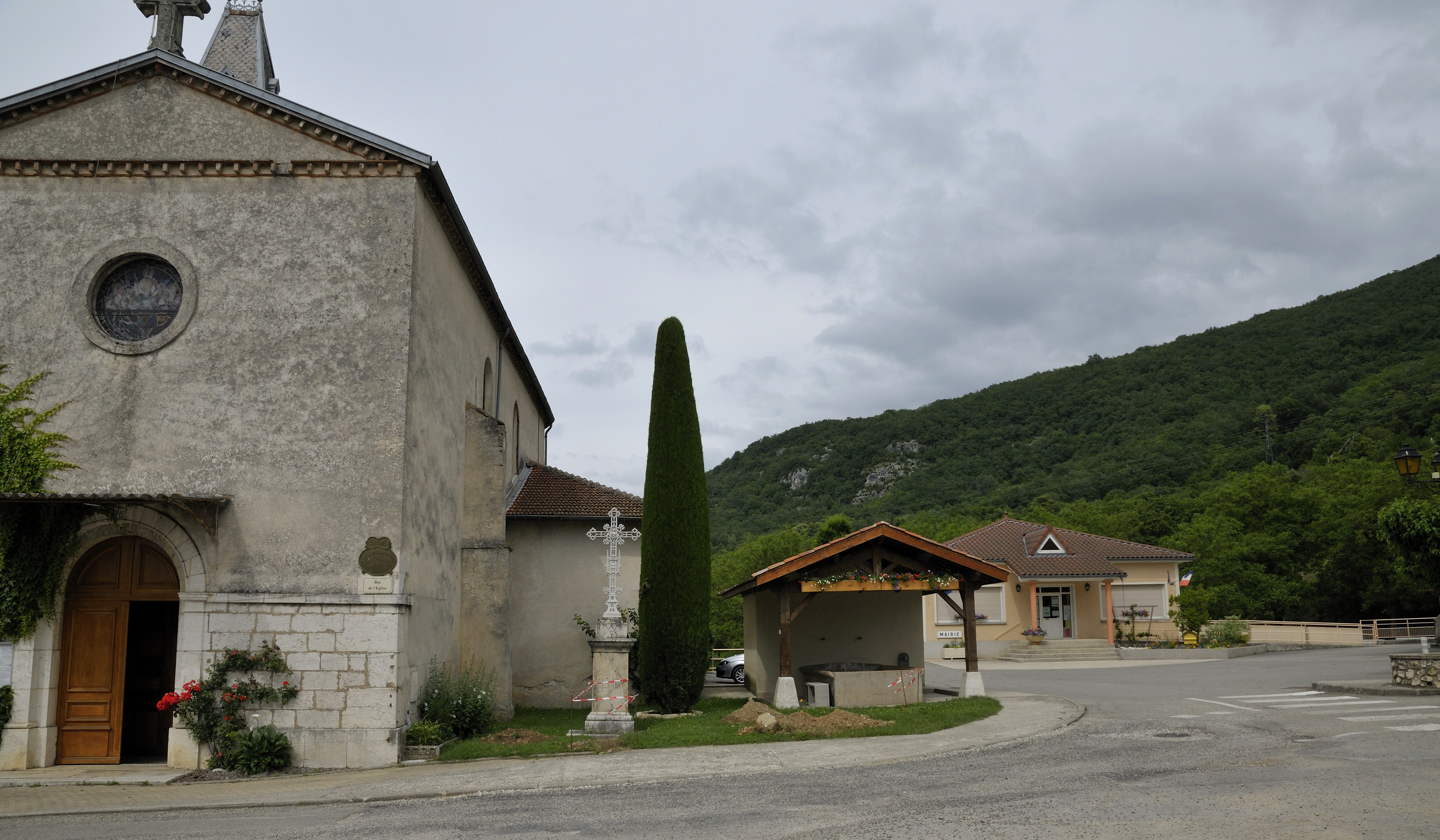
- The church and town hall
- Location of La Baume-d'Hostun
- Location within France Location within Auvergne-Rhône-Alpes
- Coordinates: 45°03′22″N 5°13′41″E
- Country: France
- Region: Auvergne-Rhône-Alpes
- Department: Drôme
- Arrondissement: Valence
- Canton: Vercors-Monts du Matin
- Intercommunality: CA Valence Romans Agglo

Government
  - Mayor (2020–2026): Marion Pelloux-Prayer
- Area^{1}: 8.46 km^{2} (3.27 sq mi)
- Highest elevation: 760 m (2,490 ft)
- Lowest elevation: 148 m (486 ft)
- Population (2023): 592
  - Density: 70.0/km^{2} (181/sq mi)
- Time zone: UTC+01:00 (CET)
  - Summer (DST): UTC+02:00 (CEST)
- INSEE/Postal code: 26034 /26730
- ^{1} French Land Register data, which excludes lakes, ponds, glaciers > 1 km^{2} (0.386 sq mi or 247 acres) and river estuaries.

La Baume-d'Hostun (French pronunciation: [la bom dɔstœ̃]; Occitan: La Bauma d'Ostun) is a commune in the Drôme department in southeastern France.

== Population ==
Historical population
Year	Pop.	±% p.a.
1968	241	—
1975	262	+1.20%
1982	250	−0.67%
1990	324	+3.29%
1999	364	+1.30%
2007	468	+3.19%
2012	561	+3.69%
2017	571	+0.35%
2023	592	+0.60%
Source: INSEE

== See also ==
- Communes of the Drôme department
