= Combovin =

- Commune
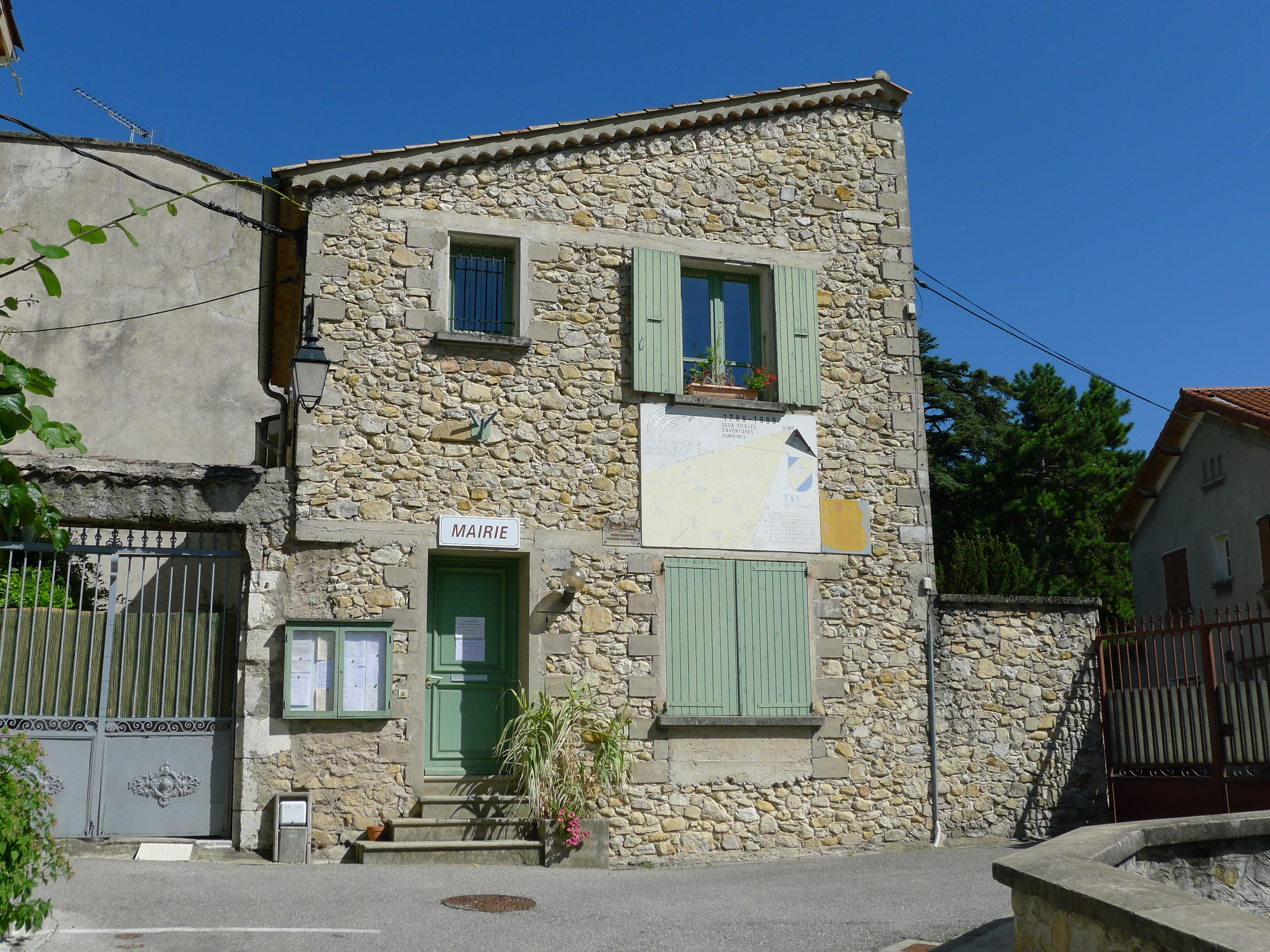
- The town hall of Combovin
- Location of Combovin
- Location within France Location within Auvergne-Rhône-Alpes
- Coordinates: 44°52′29″N 5°04′44″E
- Country: France
- Region: Auvergne-Rhône-Alpes
- Department: Drôme
- Arrondissement: Valence
- Canton: Crest
- Intercommunality: CA Valence Romans Agglo

Government
  - Mayor (2020–2026): Séverine Bouit
- Area^{1}: 35.86 km^{2} (13.85 sq mi)
- Elevation: 362 m (1,188 ft)
- Highest elevation: 1,148 m (3,766 ft)
- Lowest elevation: 336 m (1,102 ft)
- Population (2023): 476
  - Density: 13.3/km^{2} (34.4/sq mi)
- Time zone: UTC+01:00 (CET)
  - Summer (DST): UTC+02:00 (CEST)
- INSEE/Postal code: 26100 /26120
- ^{1} French Land Register data, which excludes lakes, ponds, glaciers > 1 km^{2} (0.386 sq mi or 247 acres) and river estuaries.

Combovin (French pronunciation: [kɔ̃bɔvɛ̃]) is a commune in the Drôme department in southeastern France.

== Population ==
Historical population
Year	Pop.	±% p.a.
1968	217	—
1975	214	−0.20%
1982	259	+2.76%
1990	341	+3.50%
1999	361	+0.64%
2007	407	+1.51%
2012	407	+0.00%
2017	422	+0.73%
2023	476	+2.03%
Source: INSEE

== See also ==
- Communes of the Drôme department
- Parc naturel régional du Vercors
