= Le Chaffal =

- Commune
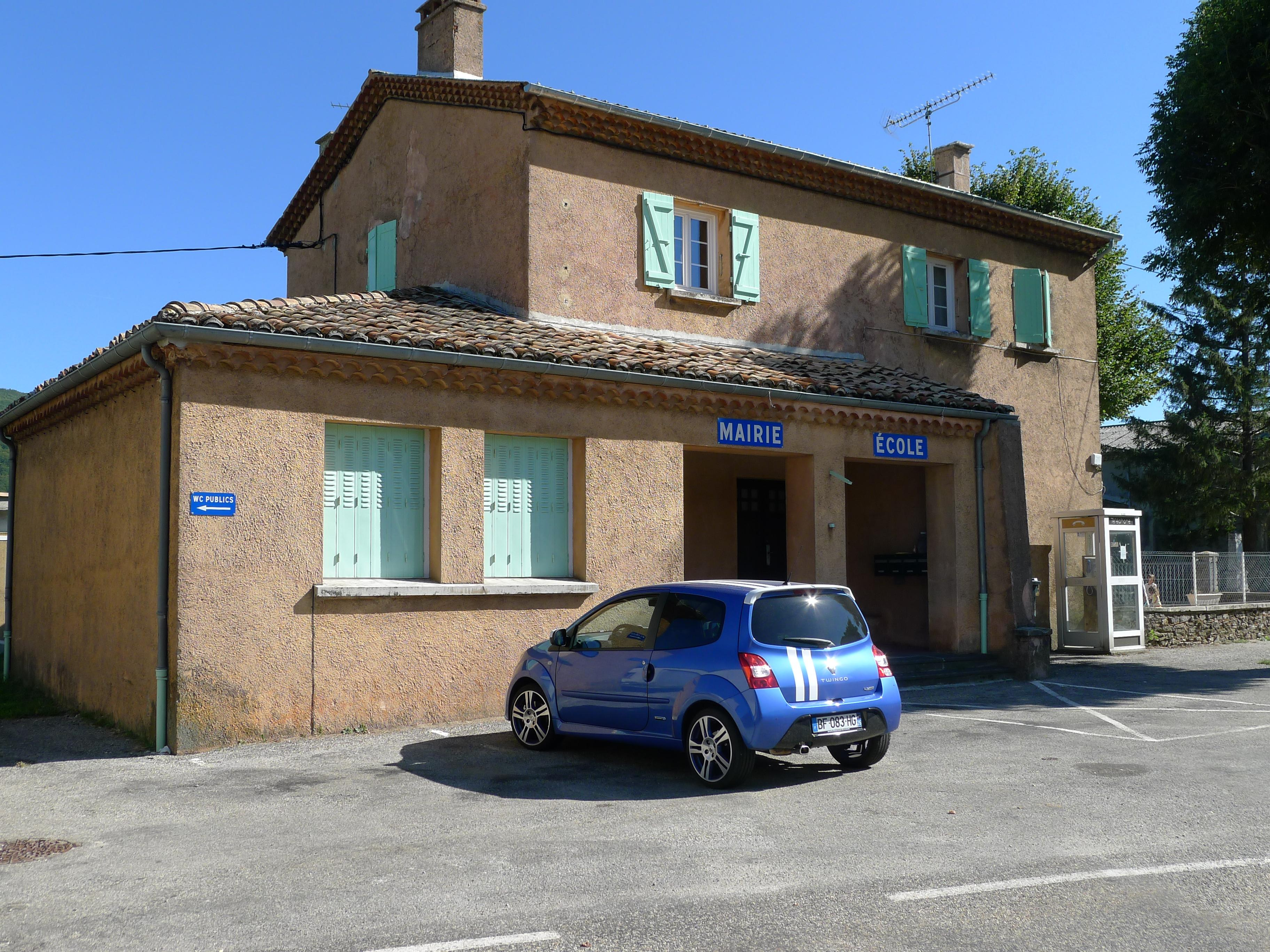
- The town hall of Le Chaffal
- Location of Le Chaffal
- Location within France Location within Auvergne-Rhône-Alpes
- Coordinates: 44°53′16″N 5°11′00″E
- Country: France
- Region: Auvergne-Rhône-Alpes
- Department: Drôme
- Arrondissement: Die
- Canton: Vercors-Monts du Matin

Government
  - Mayor (2020–2026): Claude Rousset
- Area^{1}: 11.58 km^{2} (4.47 sq mi)
- Elevation: 938 m (3,077 ft)
- Highest elevation: 1,360 m (4,460 ft)
- Lowest elevation: 674 m (2,211 ft)
- Population (2023): 35
  - Density: 3.0/km^{2} (7.8/sq mi)
- Time zone: UTC+01:00 (CET)
  - Summer (DST): UTC+02:00 (CEST)
- INSEE/Postal code: 26066 /26190
- ^{1} French Land Register data, which excludes lakes, ponds, glaciers > 1 km^{2} (0.386 sq mi or 247 acres) and river estuaries.

Le Chaffal (French pronunciation: [lə ʃafal]; Occitan: Lo Chaafalc) is a commune in the Drôme department in southeastern France.

== Population ==
Historical population
Year	Pop.	±% p.a.
1968	52	—
1975	44	−2.36%
1982	42	−0.66%
1990	43	+0.29%
1999	38	−1.36%
2007	50	+3.49%
2012	49	−0.40%
2017	39	−4.46%
2023	35	−1.79%
Source: INSEE

== See also ==
- Communes of the Drôme department
- Parc naturel régional du Vercors
