= Beauregard-Baret =

- Commune
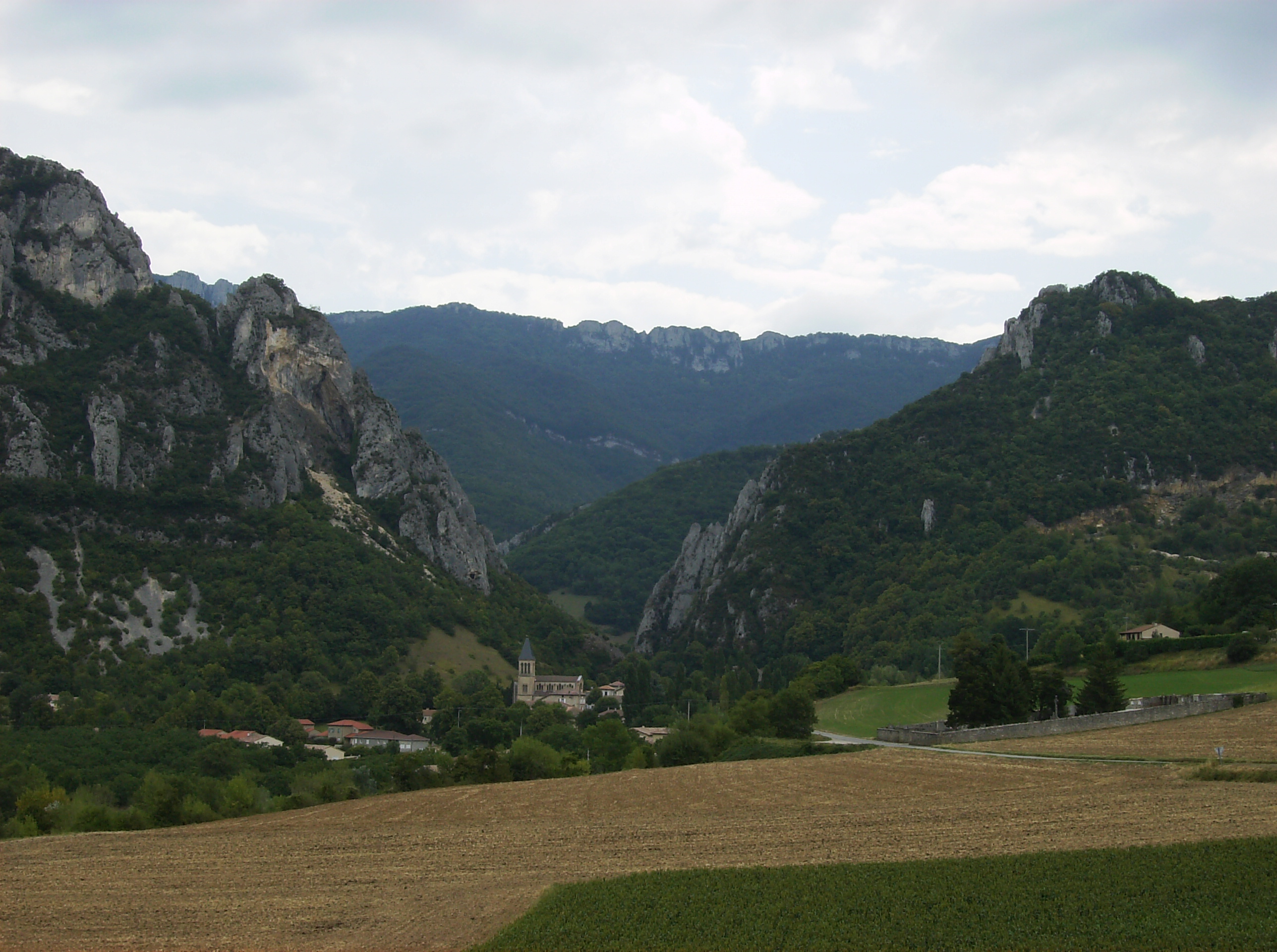
- A view of the village of Beauregard-Baret

- Coat of arms
- Location of Beauregard-Baret
- Location within France Location within Auvergne-Rhône-Alpes
- Coordinates: 45°01′00″N 5°09′07″E
- Country: France
- Region: Auvergne-Rhône-Alpes
- Department: Drôme
- Arrondissement: Valence
- Canton: Vercors-Monts du Matin
- Intercommunality: CA Valence Romans Agglo

Government
  - Mayor (2020–2026): Christian Cottini
- Area^{1}: 23.44 km^{2} (9.05 sq mi)
- Highest elevation: 1,292 m (4,239 ft)
- Lowest elevation: 141 m (463 ft)
- Population (2023): 905
  - Density: 38.6/km^{2} (100/sq mi)
- Time zone: UTC+01:00 (CET)
  - Summer (DST): UTC+02:00 (CEST)
- INSEE/Postal code: 26039 /26300
- ^{1} French Land Register data, which excludes lakes, ponds, glaciers > 1 km^{2} (0.386 sq mi or 247 acres) and river estuaries.

Beauregard-Baret (French pronunciation: [boʁɡaʁ baʁɛ]; Occitan: Bèlregard de Barret) is a commune in the Drôme department in southeastern France.

== Population ==
Historical population
Year	Pop.	±% p.a.
1968	364	—
1975	321	−1.78%
1982	429	+4.23%
1990	504	+2.03%
1999	543	+0.83%
2007	745	+4.03%
2012	804	+1.54%
2017	854	+1.21%
2023	905	+0.97%
Source: INSEE

== See also ==
- Communes of the Drôme department
