= Saint-Agnan-en-Vercors =

- Commune
- Location of Saint-Agnan-en-Vercors
- Location within France Location within Auvergne-Rhône-Alpes
- Coordinates: 44°56′11″N 5°25′54″E
- Country: France
- Region: Auvergne-Rhône-Alpes
- Department: Drôme
- Arrondissement: Die
- Canton: Vercors-Monts du Matin

Government
  - Mayor (2020–2026): Jacques Armand
- Area^{1}: 84.21 km^{2} (32.51 sq mi)
- Elevation: 804 m (2,638 ft)
- Highest elevation: 1,734 m (5,689 ft)
- Lowest elevation: 727 m (2,385 ft)
- Population (2023): 384
  - Density: 4.56/km^{2} (11.8/sq mi)
- Time zone: UTC+01:00 (CET)
  - Summer (DST): UTC+02:00 (CEST)
- INSEE/Postal code: 26290 /26420
- ^{1} French Land Register data, which excludes lakes, ponds, glaciers > 1 km^{2} (0.386 sq mi or 247 acres) and river estuaries.

Saint-Agnan-en-Vercors (French pronunciation: [sɛ̃t‿aɲɑ̃ ɑ̃ vɛʁkɔʁ], literally Saint-Agnan in Vercors; Occitan: Sant Anhan de VercòrsVivaro-Alpine: Sant Anhan de Vercòrs) is a commune in the Drôme department in southeastern France.

== Population ==
Historical population
Year	Pop.	±% p.a.
1968	390	—
1975	335	−2.15%
1982	344	+0.38%
1990	363	+0.67%
1999	402	+1.14%
2007	383	−0.60%
2012	392	+0.47%
2017	376	−0.83%
2023	384	+0.35%
Source: INSEE

== See also ==
- Communes of the Drôme department
- Parc naturel régional du Vercors
