= Saint-Julien-en-Vercors =

- Commune
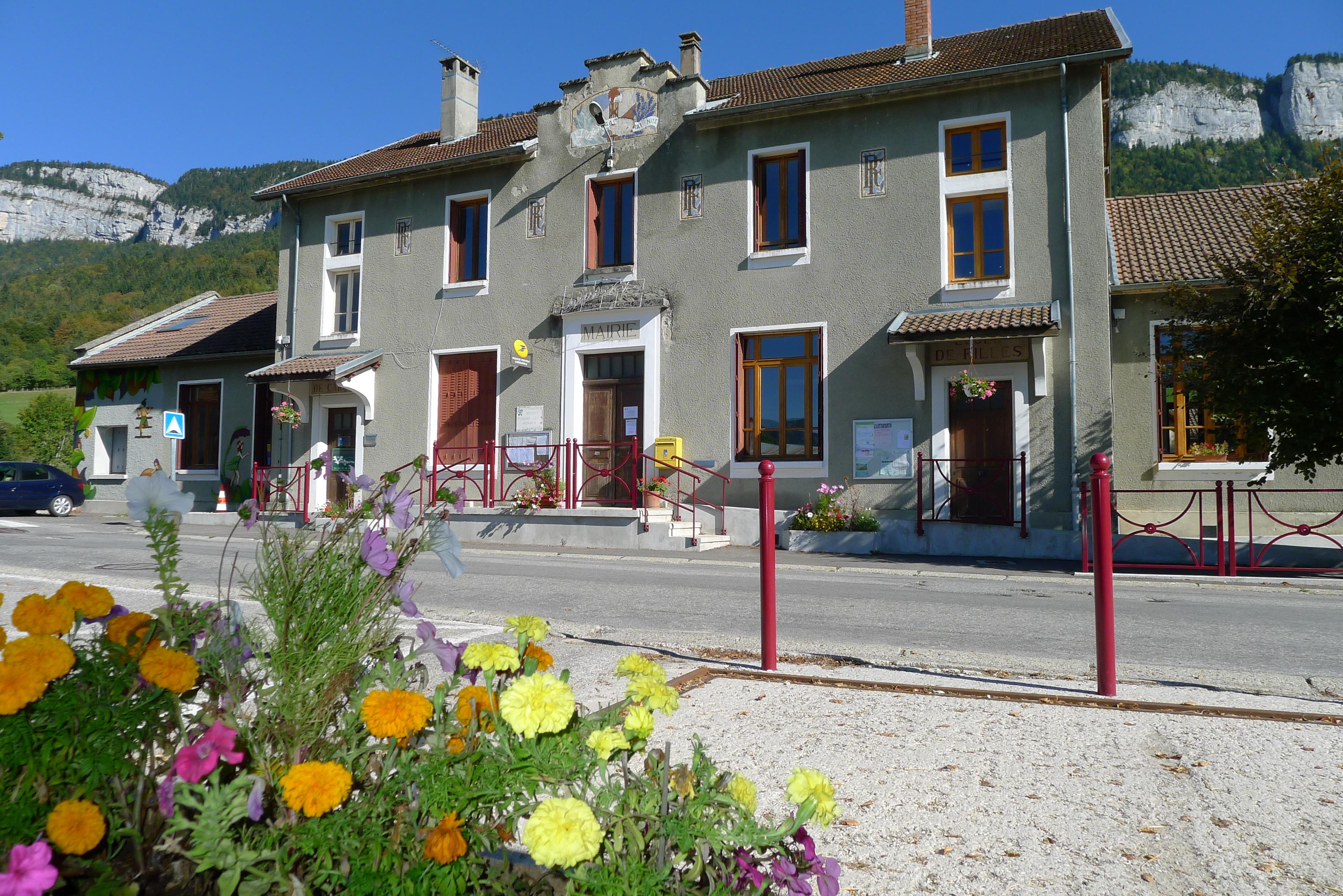
- Town hall
- Location of Saint-Julien-en-Vercors
- Location within France Location within Auvergne-Rhône-Alpes
- Coordinates: 45°03′N 5°28′E
- Country: France
- Region: Auvergne-Rhône-Alpes
- Department: Drôme
- Arrondissement: Die
- Canton: Vercors-Monts du Matin

Government
  - Mayor (2020–2026): Pierre-Louis Fillet
- Area^{1}: 18.47 km^{2} (7.13 sq mi)
- Elevation: 915 m (3,002 ft)
- Highest elevation: 1,605 m (5,266 ft)
- Lowest elevation: 412 m (1,352 ft)
- Population (2023): 264
  - Density: 14.3/km^{2} (37.0/sq mi)
- Time zone: UTC+01:00 (CET)
  - Summer (DST): UTC+02:00 (CEST)
- INSEE/Postal code: 26309 /26420
- ^{1} French Land Register data, which excludes lakes, ponds, glaciers > 1 km^{2} (0.386 sq mi or 247 acres) and river estuaries.

Saint-Julien-en-Vercors (French pronunciation: [sɛ̃ ʒyljɛ̃ ɑ̃ vɛʁkɔʁ], literally Saint-Julien in Vercors; Occitan: Sant Julian de VercòrsVivaro-Alpine: Sant Julian de Vercòrs) is a commune in the Drôme department in southeastern France.

== Population ==
Historical population
| Year | Pop. | ±% p.a. |
|---|---|---|
| 1968 | 199 | — |
| 1975 | 192 | −0.51% |
| 1982 | 169 | −1.81% |
| 1990 | 182 | +0.93% |
| 1999 | 194 | +0.71% |
| 2007 | 223 | +1.76% |
| 2012 | 240 | +1.48% |
| 2017 | 238 | −0.17% |
| 2023 | 264 | +1.74% |
Source: INSEE

== See also ==
- Communes of the Drôme department
- Parc naturel régional du Vercors
