= Saint-Martin-en-Vercors =

- Commune
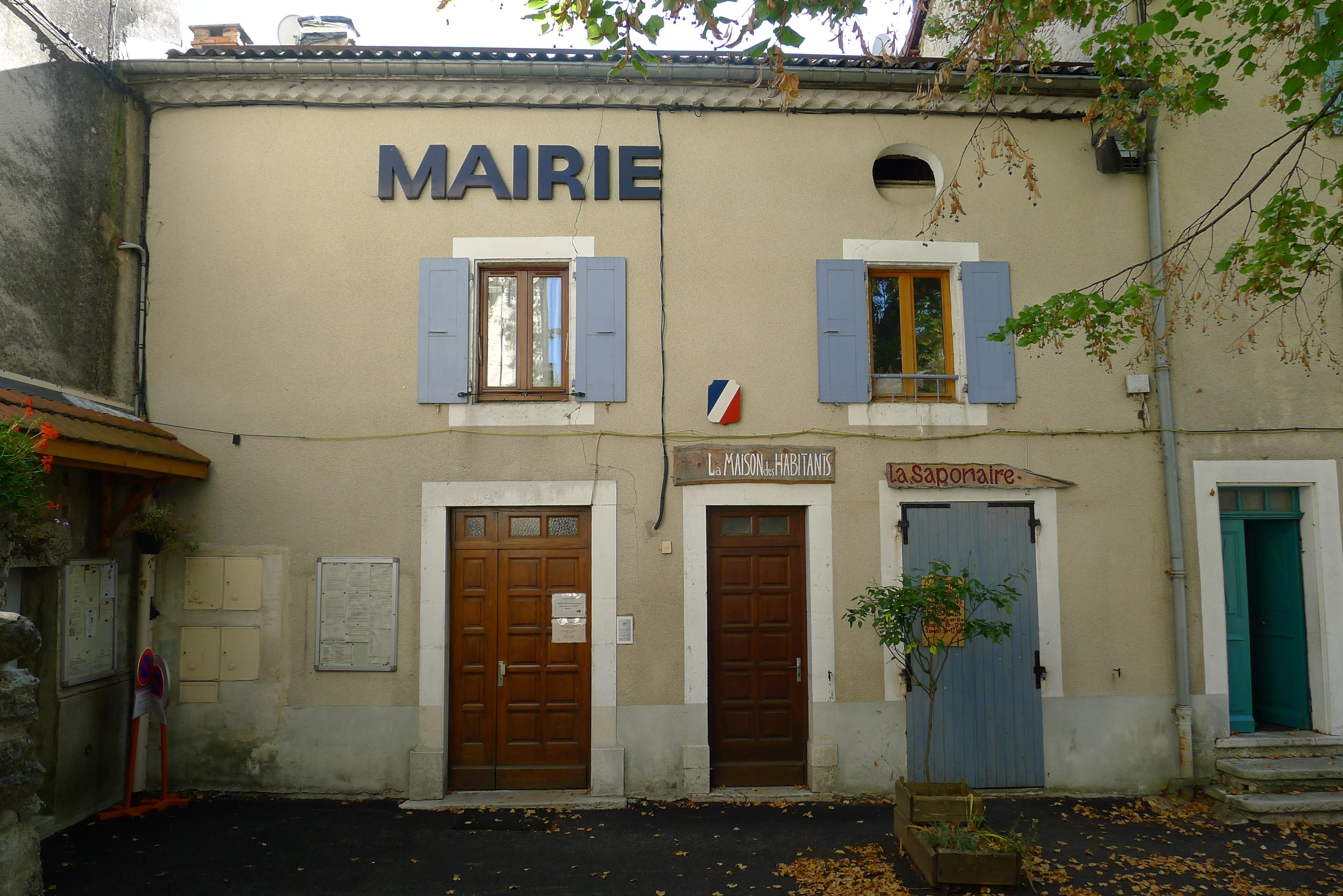
- Town hall
- Location of Saint-Martin-en-Vercors
- Location within France Location within Auvergne-Rhône-Alpes
- Coordinates: 45°01′23″N 5°26′35″E
- Country: France
- Region: Auvergne-Rhône-Alpes
- Department: Drôme
- Arrondissement: Die
- Canton: Vercors-Monts du Matin

Government
  - Mayor (2020–2026): Andrée Sequier
- Area^{1}: 27.13 km^{2} (10.47 sq mi)
- Elevation: 780 m (2,560 ft)
- Highest elevation: 1,575 m (5,167 ft)
- Lowest elevation: 600 m (2,000 ft)
- Population (2023): 437
  - Density: 16.1/km^{2} (41.7/sq mi)
- Time zone: UTC+01:00 (CET)
  - Summer (DST): UTC+02:00 (CEST)
- INSEE/Postal code: 26315 /26420
- ^{1} French Land Register data, which excludes lakes, ponds, glaciers > 1 km^{2} (0.386 sq mi or 247 acres) and river estuaries.

Saint-Martin-en-Vercors (French pronunciation: [sɛ̃ maʁtɛ̃ ɑ̃ vɛʁkɔʁ], literally Saint-Martin in Vercors; Vivaro-Alpine: Sant Martin de Vercòrs) is a commune in the Drôme department in southeastern France.

== Population ==
Historical population
Year	Pop.	±% p.a.
1968	318	—
1975	285	−1.55%
1982	292	+0.35%
1990	275	−0.75%
1999	295	+0.78%
2007	355	+2.34%
2012	427	+3.76%
2017	361	−3.30%
2023	437	+3.24%
Source: INSEE

== See also ==
- Communes of the Drôme department
- Parc naturel régional du Vercors
