= Establet =

- Commune
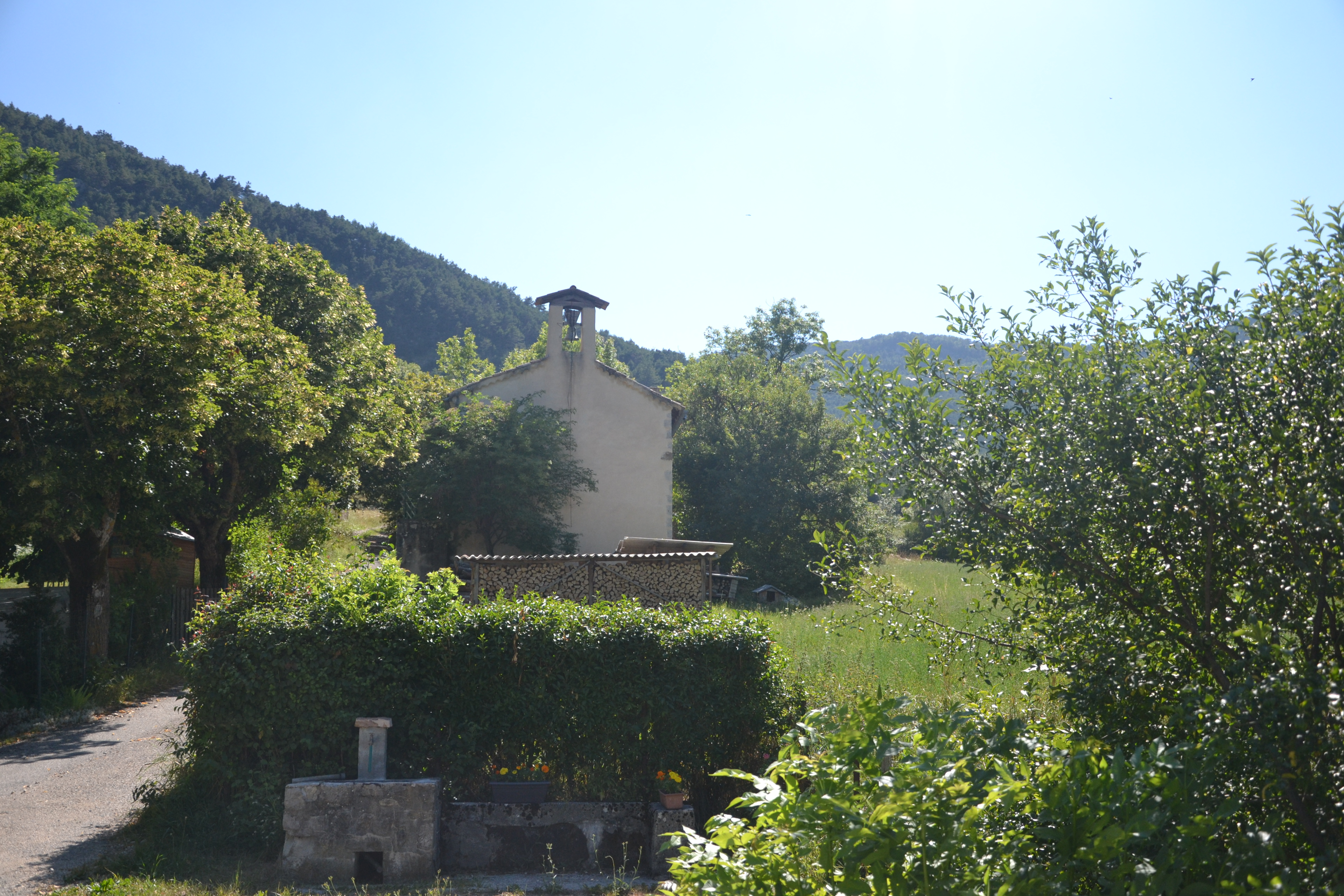
- The church in Establet
- Location of Establet
- Location within France Location within Auvergne-Rhône-Alpes
- Coordinates: 44°30′25″N 5°26′19″E
- Country: France
- Region: Auvergne-Rhône-Alpes
- Department: Drôme
- Arrondissement: Die
- Canton: Le Diois
- Intercommunality: Diois

Government
  - Mayor (2025–2026): Jean-Michel Thery
- Area^{1}: 12.58 km^{2} (4.86 sq mi)
- Highest elevation: 1,400 m (4,600 ft)
- Lowest elevation: 632 m (2,073 ft)
- Population (2023): 27
  - Density: 2.1/km^{2} (5.6/sq mi)
- Time zone: UTC+01:00 (CET)
  - Summer (DST): UTC+02:00 (CEST)
- INSEE/Postal code: 26123 /26470
- ^{1} French Land Register data, which excludes lakes, ponds, glaciers > 1 km^{2} (0.386 sq mi or 247 acres) and river estuaries.

Establet (French pronunciation: [ɛstablɛ]) is a commune in the Drôme department in the Auvergne-Rhône-Alpes region in southeastern France.

== Population ==
Historical population
| Year | Pop. | ±% p.a. |
|---|---|---|
| 1968 | 33 | — |
| 1975 | 25 | −3.89% |
| 1982 | 14 | −7.95% |
| 1990 | 19 | +3.89% |
| 1999 | 21 | +1.12% |
| 2007 | 27 | +3.19% |
| 2012 | 29 | +1.44% |
| 2017 | 27 | −1.42% |
| 2023 | 27 | +0.00% |
Source: INSEE

== See also ==
- Communes of the Drôme department
