= Pennes-le-Sec =

- Commune
- Location of Pennes-le-Sec
- Location within France Location within Auvergne-Rhône-Alpes
- Coordinates: 44°38′20″N 5°19′09″E
- Country: France
- Region: Auvergne-Rhône-Alpes
- Department: Drôme
- Arrondissement: Die
- Canton: Le Diois
- Intercommunality: Diois

Government
  - Mayor (2020–2026): Marielle Peyroche
- Area^{1}: 9.31 km^{2} (3.59 sq mi)
- Highest elevation: 1,339 m (4,393 ft)
- Lowest elevation: 421 m (1,381 ft)
- Population (2023): 21
  - Density: 2.3/km^{2} (5.8/sq mi)
- Time zone: UTC+01:00 (CET)
  - Summer (DST): UTC+02:00 (CEST)
- INSEE/Postal code: 26228 /26340
- ^{1} French Land Register data, which excludes lakes, ponds, glaciers > 1 km^{2} (0.386 sq mi or 247 acres) and river estuaries.

Pennes-le-Sec (French pronunciation: [pɛn lə sɛk]; Occitan: La Pena) is a commune in the Drôme department in southeastern France.

== Population ==
Historical population
Year	Pop.	±% p.a.
1968	48	—
1975	57	+2.49%
1982	24	−11.62%
1990	12	−8.30%
1999	20	+5.84%
2007	18	−1.31%
2012	26	+7.63%
2017	36	+6.72%
2023	21	−8.59%
Source: INSEE

== See also ==
- Communes of the Drôme department
