= Marignac-en-Diois =

- Commune
- Location of Marignac-en-Diois
- Location within France Location within Auvergne-Rhône-Alpes
- Coordinates: 44°48′11″N 5°20′03″E
- Country: France
- Region: Auvergne-Rhône-Alpes
- Department: Drôme
- Arrondissement: Die
- Canton: Le Diois
- Intercommunality: Diois

Government
  - Mayor (2022–2026): Bernard Sellier
- Area^{1}: 18.26 km^{2} (7.05 sq mi)
- Elevation: 623 m (2,044 ft)
- Highest elevation: 1,641 m (5,384 ft)
- Lowest elevation: 531 m (1,742 ft)
- Population (2023): 231
  - Density: 12.7/km^{2} (32.8/sq mi)
- Time zone: UTC+01:00 (CET)
  - Summer (DST): UTC+02:00 (CEST)
- INSEE/Postal code: 26175 /26150
- ^{1} French Land Register data, which excludes lakes, ponds, glaciers > 1 km^{2} (0.386 sq mi or 247 acres) and river estuaries.

Marignac-en-Diois (French pronunciation: [maʁiɲak ɑ̃ diwa]; Occitan: Marinhac de Diés) is a commune in the Drôme department in southeastern France.

== Population ==
Historical population
Year	Pop.	±% p.a.
1968	74	—
1975	71	−0.59%
1982	78	+1.35%
1990	95	+2.50%
1999	135	+3.98%
2007	156	+1.82%
2012	192	+4.24%
2017	214	+2.19%
2023	231	+1.28%
Source: INSEE

== See also ==
- Communes of the Drôme department
- Parc naturel régional du Vercors
