= Lesches-en-Diois =

- Commune
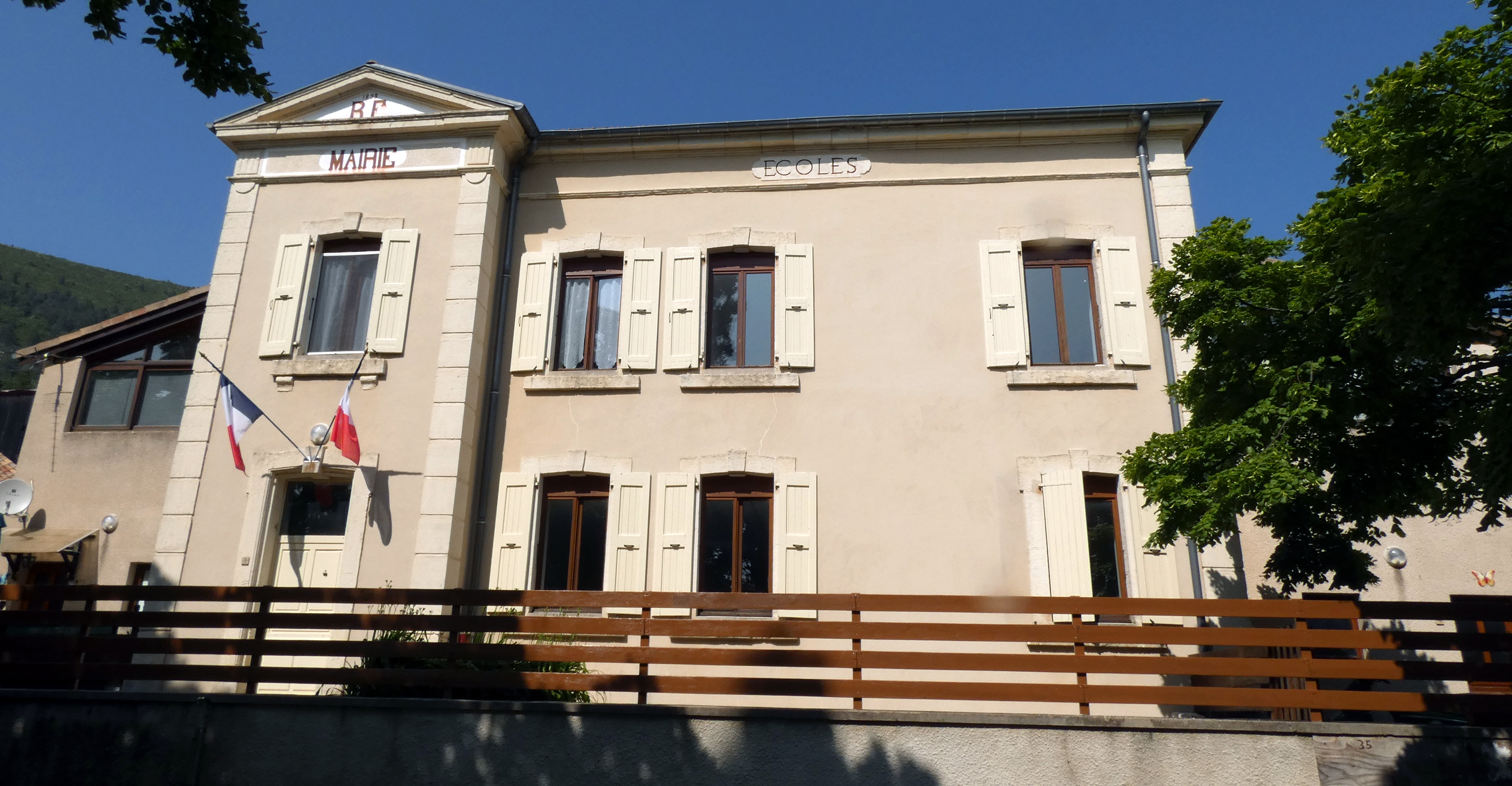
- Lesches-en-Diois Town hall
- Location of Lesches-en-Diois
- Location within France Location within Auvergne-Rhône-Alpes
- Coordinates: 44°35′55″N 5°31′46″E
- Country: France
- Region: Auvergne-Rhône-Alpes
- Department: Drôme
- Arrondissement: Die
- Canton: Le Diois
- Intercommunality: Diois

Government
  - Mayor (2020–2026): Martine Julien
- Area^{1}: 20.08 km^{2} (7.75 sq mi)
- Elevation: 1,030 m (3,380 ft)
- Highest elevation: 1,549 m (5,082 ft)
- Lowest elevation: 642 m (2,106 ft)
- Population (2023): 57
  - Density: 2.8/km^{2} (7.4/sq mi)
- Time zone: UTC+01:00 (CET)
  - Summer (DST): UTC+02:00 (CEST)
- INSEE/Postal code: 26164 /26310
- ^{1} French Land Register data, which excludes lakes, ponds, glaciers > 1 km^{2} (0.386 sq mi or 247 acres) and river estuaries.

Lesches-en-Diois (French pronunciation: [lɛʃ ɑ̃ diwa]; Occitan: Leschas) is a commune in the Drôme department in southeastern France.

== Population ==
Historical population
Year	Pop.	±% p.a.
1968	91	—
1975	80	−1.82%
1982	64	−3.14%
1990	49	−3.28%
1999	33	−4.30%
2007	52	+5.85%
2012	52	+0.00%
2017	53	+0.38%
2023	57	+1.22%
Source: INSEE

== See also ==
- Communes of the Drôme department
