= Chamaloc =

- Commune
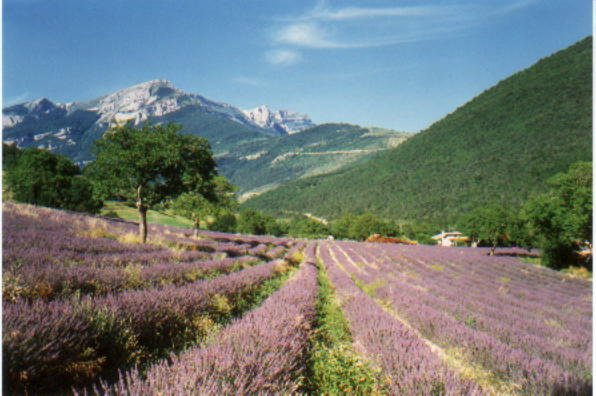
- Fields of lavender at Chamaloc
- Location of Chamaloc
- Location within France Location within Auvergne-Rhône-Alpes
- Coordinates: 44°47′59″N 5°23′05″E
- Country: France
- Region: Auvergne-Rhône-Alpes
- Department: Drôme
- Arrondissement: Die
- Canton: Le Diois
- Intercommunality: Diois

Government
  - Mayor (2020–2026): Michel Vartanian
- Area^{1}: 21.89 km^{2} (8.45 sq mi)
- Highest elevation: 1,654 m (5,427 ft)
- Lowest elevation: 471 m (1,545 ft)
- Population (2023): 119
  - Density: 5.44/km^{2} (14.1/sq mi)
- Time zone: UTC+01:00 (CET)
  - Summer (DST): UTC+02:00 (CEST)
- INSEE/Postal code: 26069 /26150
- ^{1} French Land Register data, which excludes lakes, ponds, glaciers > 1 km^{2} (0.386 sq mi or 247 acres) and river estuaries.

Chamaloc (French pronunciation: [ʃamalɔk]; Occitan: Chamalòsc) is a commune of the Drôme department in southeastern France.

== Population ==
Historical population
Year	Pop.	±% p.a.
1968	75	—
1975	52	−5.10%
1982	85	+7.27%
1990	93	+1.13%
1999	101	+0.92%
2007	114	+1.52%
2012	126	+2.02%
2017	131	+0.78%
2023	119	−1.59%
Source: INSEE

== See also ==
- Communes of the Drôme department
- Parc naturel régional du Vercors
