= Chalancon =

- Commune
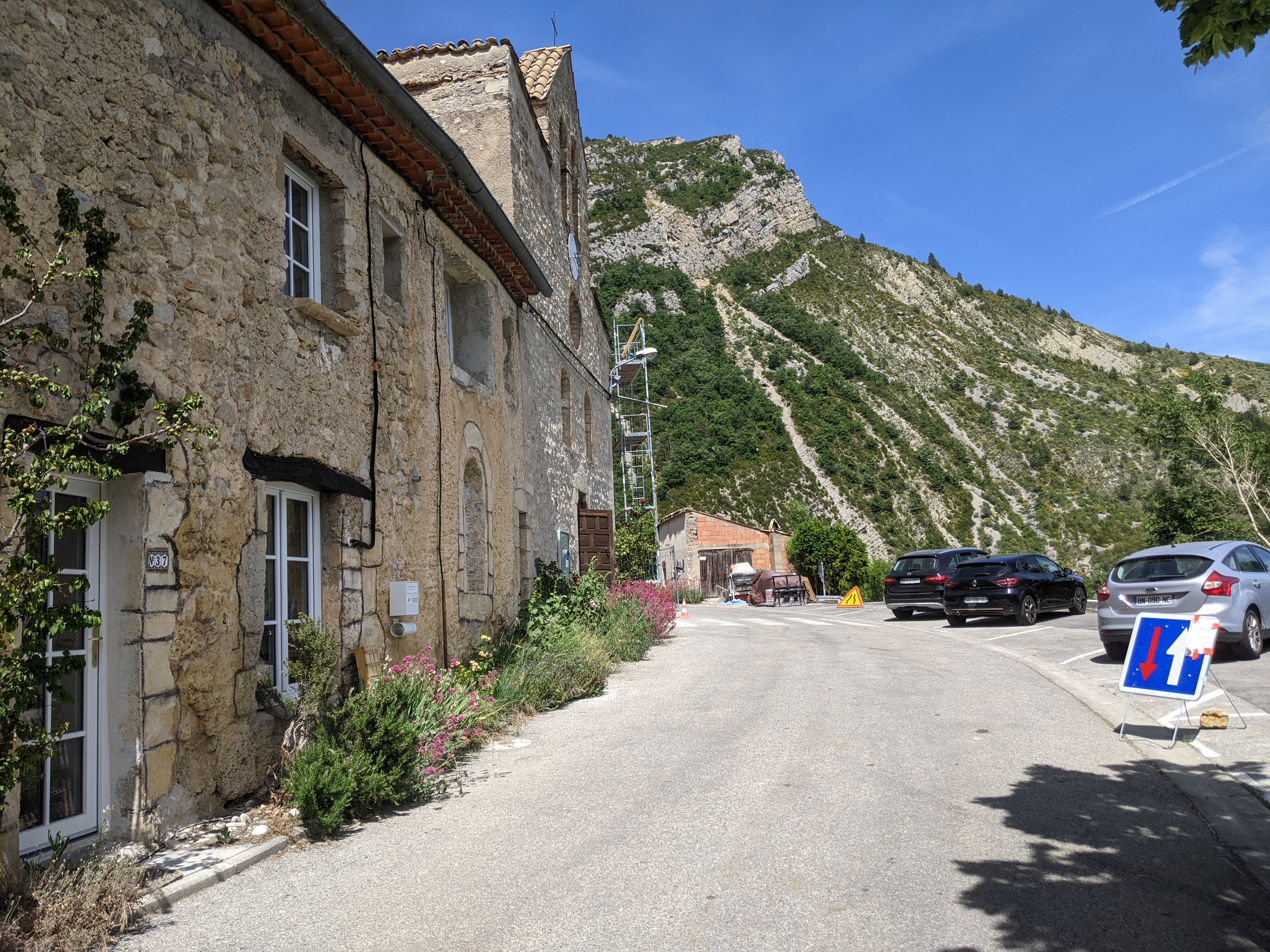
- Location of Chalancon
- Location within France Location within Auvergne-Rhône-Alpes
- Coordinates: 44°30′37″N 5°20′54″E
- Country: France
- Region: Auvergne-Rhône-Alpes
- Department: Drôme
- Arrondissement: Die
- Canton: Le Diois
- Intercommunality: Diois

Government
  - Mayor (2020–2026): Isabelle Plasse
- Area^{1}: 36 km^{2} (14 sq mi)
- Highest elevation: 1,522 m (4,993 ft)
- Lowest elevation: 591 m (1,939 ft)
- Population (2023): 59
  - Density: 1.6/km^{2} (4.2/sq mi)
- Time zone: UTC+01:00 (CET)
  - Summer (DST): UTC+02:00 (CEST)
- INSEE/Postal code: 26067 /26470
- ^{1} French Land Register data, which excludes lakes, ponds, glaciers > 1 km^{2} (0.386 sq mi or 247 acres) and river estuaries.

Chalancon (French pronunciation: [ʃalɑ̃kɔ̃]) is a commune of the Drôme department in southeastern France.

== Population ==
Historical population
Year	Pop.	±% p.a.
1968	93	—
1975	77	−2.66%
1982	76	−0.19%
1990	81	+0.80%
1999	56	−4.02%
2007	62	+1.28%
2012	54	−2.73%
2017	53	−0.37%
2023	59	+1.80%
Source: INSEE

== See also ==
- Communes of the Drôme department
