= Saint-Benoit-en-Diois =

- Commune
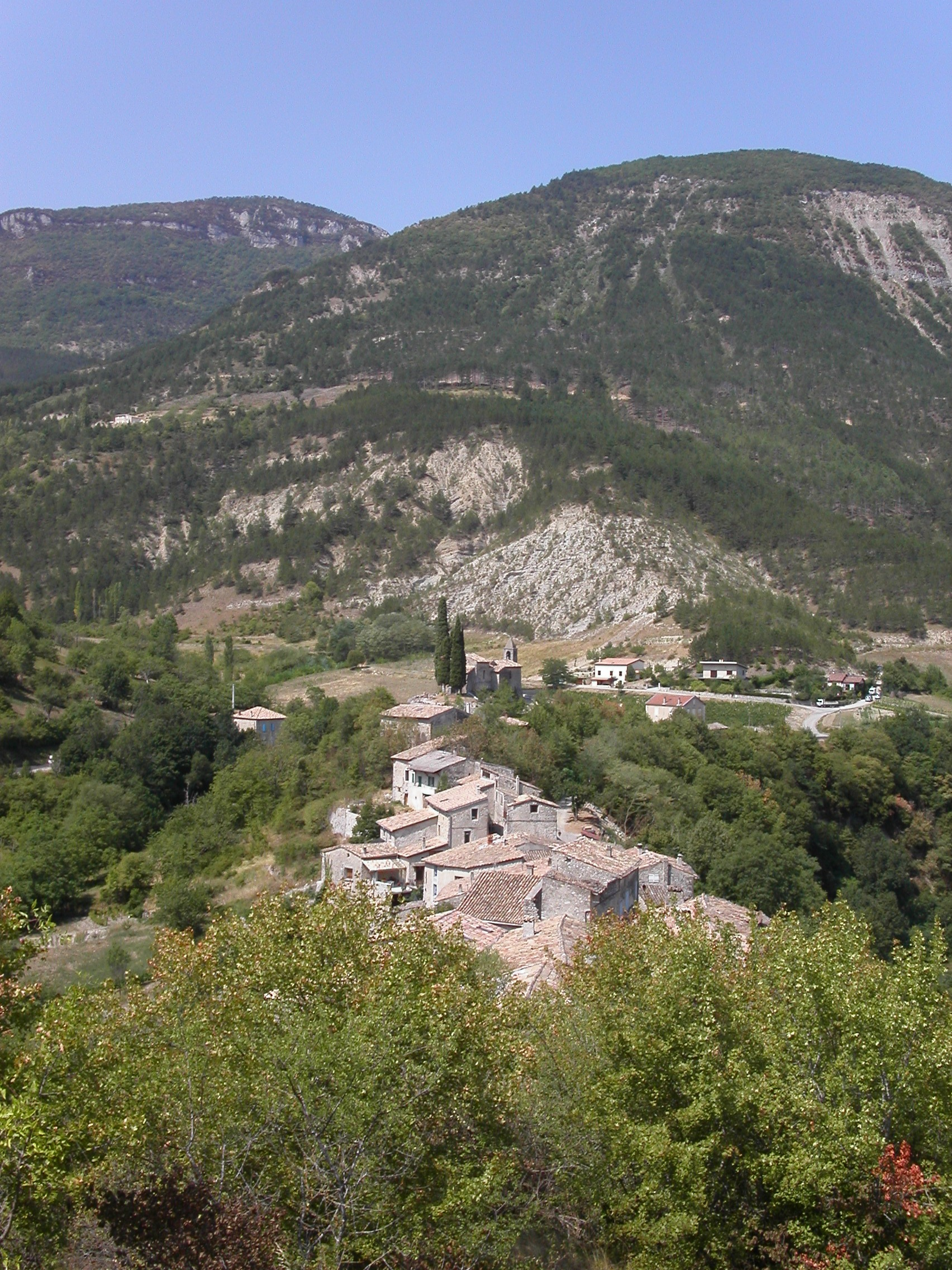
- Saint-Benoit-en-Diois seen from the château ruins

- Coat of arms
- Location of Saint-Benoit-en-Diois
- Location within France Location within Auvergne-Rhône-Alpes
- Coordinates: 44°39′49″N 5°16′23″E
- Country: France
- Region: Auvergne-Rhône-Alpes
- Department: Drôme
- Arrondissement: Die
- Canton: Le Diois

Government
  - Mayor (2020–2026): Jean-Louis Baudouin
- Area^{1}: 11.17 km^{2} (4.31 sq mi)
- Elevation: 387 m (1,270 ft)
- Highest elevation: 1,198 m (3,930 ft)
- Lowest elevation: 306 m (1,004 ft)
- Population (2023): 31
  - Density: 2.8/km^{2} (7.2/sq mi)
- Time zone: UTC+01:00 (CET)
  - Summer (DST): UTC+02:00 (CEST)
- INSEE/Postal code: 26296 /26340
- ^{1} French Land Register data, which excludes lakes, ponds, glaciers > 1 km^{2} (0.386 sq mi or 247 acres) and river estuaries.

Saint-Benoit-en-Diois (French pronunciation: [sɛ̃ bənwa ɑ̃ diwa]; Vivaro-Alpine: Sant Benest de Diés) is a commune in the Drôme department in southeastern France.

== Population ==
Historical population
Year	Pop.	±% p.a.
1968	41	—
1975	31	−3.92%
1982	30	−0.47%
1990	29	−0.42%
1999	31	+0.74%
2007	38	+2.58%
2012	27	−6.61%
2017	27	+0.00%
2023	31	+2.33%
Source: INSEE

== See also ==
- Communes of the Drôme department
