= Beaumont-en-Diois =

- Commune
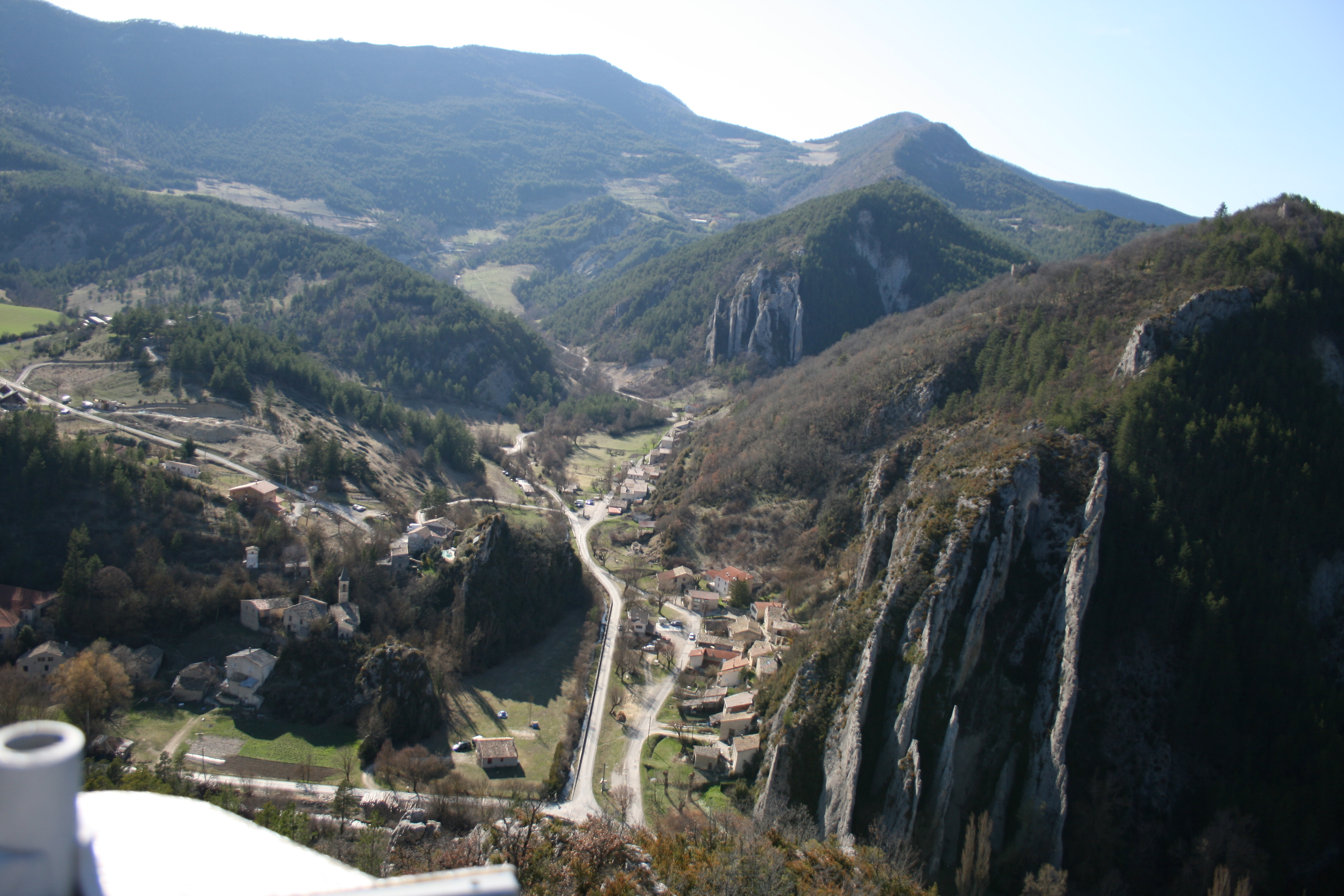
- Beaumont-en-Diois from above
- Location of Beaumont-en-Diois
- Location within France Location within Auvergne-Rhône-Alpes
- Coordinates: 44°34′17″N 5°28′36″E
- Country: France
- Region: Auvergne-Rhône-Alpes
- Department: Drôme
- Arrondissement: Die
- Canton: Le Diois
- Intercommunality: Diois

Government
  - Mayor (2020–2026): Isabelle Allemand
- Area^{1}: 17.65 km^{2} (6.81 sq mi)
- Highest elevation: 1,408 m (4,619 ft)
- Lowest elevation: 637 m (2,090 ft)
- Population (2023): 103
  - Density: 5.84/km^{2} (15.1/sq mi)
- Time zone: UTC+01:00 (CET)
  - Summer (DST): UTC+02:00 (CEST)
- INSEE/Postal code: 26036 /26310
- ^{1} French Land Register data, which excludes lakes, ponds, glaciers > 1 km^{2} (0.386 sq mi or 247 acres) and river estuaries.

Beaumont-en-Diois (French pronunciation: [bomɔ̃ ɑ̃ diwa]; Occitan: Bèumont de Diés) is a commune in the Drôme department in southeastern France.

== Population ==
Historical population
Year	Pop.	±% p.a.
1968	84	—
1975	61	−4.47%
1982	42	−5.19%
1990	58	+4.12%
1999	75	+2.90%
2007	77	+0.33%
2012	87	+2.47%
2017	104	+3.63%
2023	103	−0.16%
Source: INSEE

== See also ==
- Communes of the Drôme department
