= Menglon =

- Commune
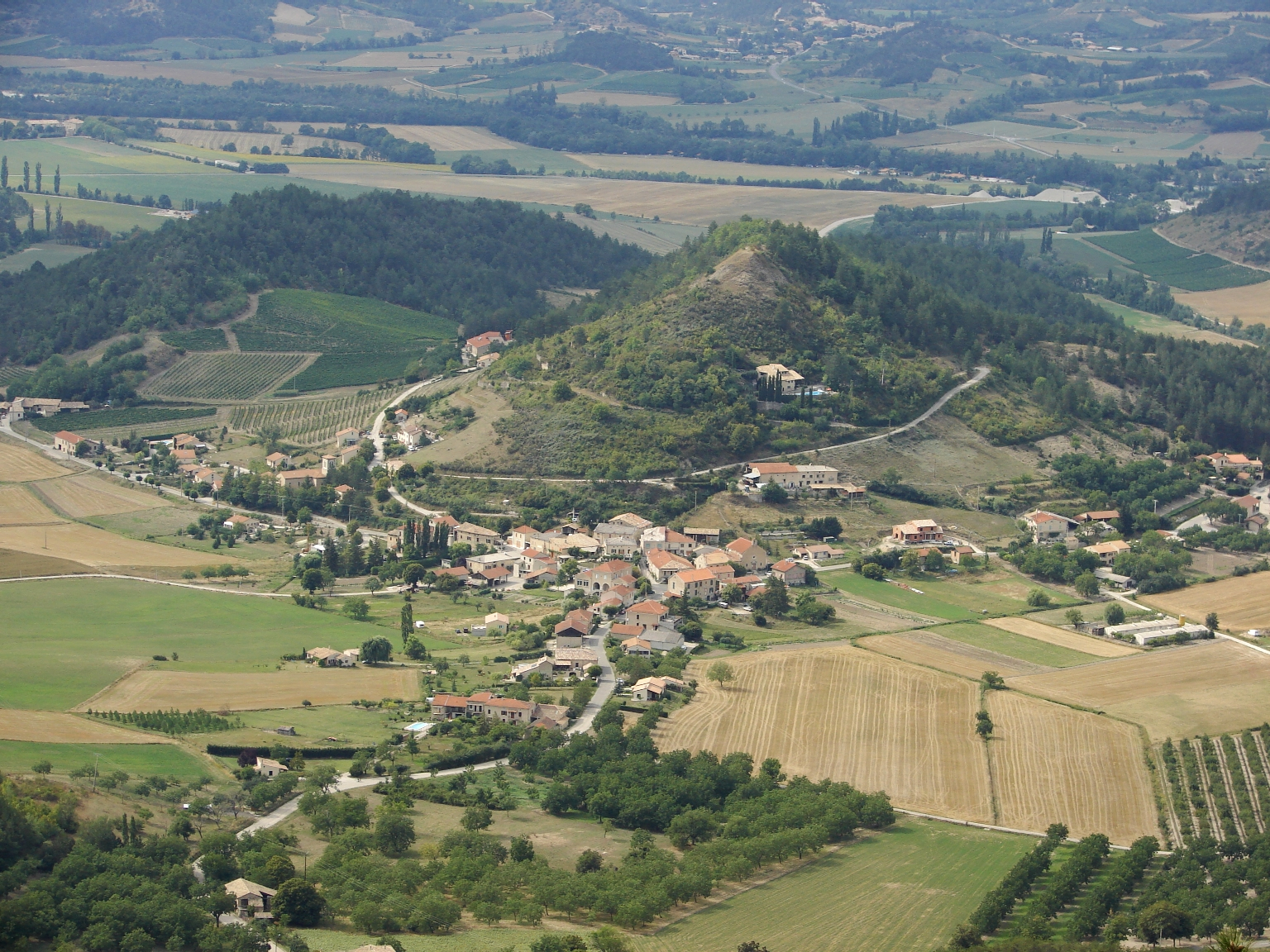
- An aerial view of Menglon
- Location of Menglon
- Location within France Location within Auvergne-Rhône-Alpes
- Coordinates: 44°39′54″N 5°27′46″E
- Country: France
- Region: Auvergne-Rhône-Alpes
- Department: Drôme
- Arrondissement: Die
- Canton: Le Diois
- Intercommunality: Diois

Government
  - Mayor (2020–2026): Jean-Marc Favier
- Area^{1}: 36.47 km^{2} (14.08 sq mi)
- Elevation: 580 m (1,900 ft)
- Highest elevation: 1,501 m (4,925 ft)
- Lowest elevation: 487 m (1,598 ft)
- Population (2023): 539
  - Density: 14.8/km^{2} (38.3/sq mi)
- Time zone: UTC+01:00 (CET)
  - Summer (DST): UTC+02:00 (CEST)
- INSEE/Postal code: 26178 /26410
- ^{1} French Land Register data, which excludes lakes, ponds, glaciers > 1 km^{2} (0.386 sq mi or 247 acres) and river estuaries.

Menglon (French pronunciation: [mɑ̃ɡlɔ̃]) is a commune in the Drôme department in southeastern France.

== Population ==
Historical population
Year	Pop.	±% p.a.
1968	331	—
1975	317	−0.62%
1982	287	−1.41%
1990	332	+1.84%
1999	355	+0.75%
2007	393	+1.28%
2012	447	+2.61%
2017	517	+2.95%
2023	539	+0.70%
Source: INSEE

== See also ==
- Communes of the Drôme department
