= Ponet-et-Saint-Auban =

- Commune
- Location of Ponet-et-Saint-Auban
- Location within France Location within Auvergne-Rhône-Alpes
- Coordinates: 44°47′18″N 5°19′02″E
- Country: France
- Region: Auvergne-Rhône-Alpes
- Department: Drôme
- Arrondissement: Die
- Canton: Le Diois
- Intercommunality: Diois

Government
  - Mayor (2020–2026): Daniel Rolland
- Area^{1}: 13.21 km^{2} (5.10 sq mi)
- Highest elevation: 1,041 m (3,415 ft)
- Lowest elevation: 353 m (1,158 ft)
- Population (2023): 141
  - Density: 10.7/km^{2} (27.6/sq mi)
- Time zone: UTC+01:00 (CET)
  - Summer (DST): UTC+02:00 (CEST)
- INSEE/Postal code: 26246 /26150
- ^{1} French Land Register data, which excludes lakes, ponds, glaciers > 1 km^{2} (0.386 sq mi or 247 acres) and river estuaries.

Ponet-et-Saint-Auban (French pronunciation: [pɔnɛ e sɛ̃.t‿obɑ̃]; Occitan: Ponet e Sant Auban) is a commune in the Drôme department in southeastern France.

== Population ==
Historical population
Year	Pop.	±% p.a.
1968	79	—
1975	68	−2.12%
1982	100	+5.66%
1990	99	−0.13%
1999	89	−1.18%
2007	124	+4.23%
2012	130	+0.95%
2017	125	−0.78%
2023	141	+2.03%
Source: INSEE

== See also ==
- Communes of the Drôme department
- Parc naturel régional du Vercors
