= Eygluy-Escoulin =

- Commune
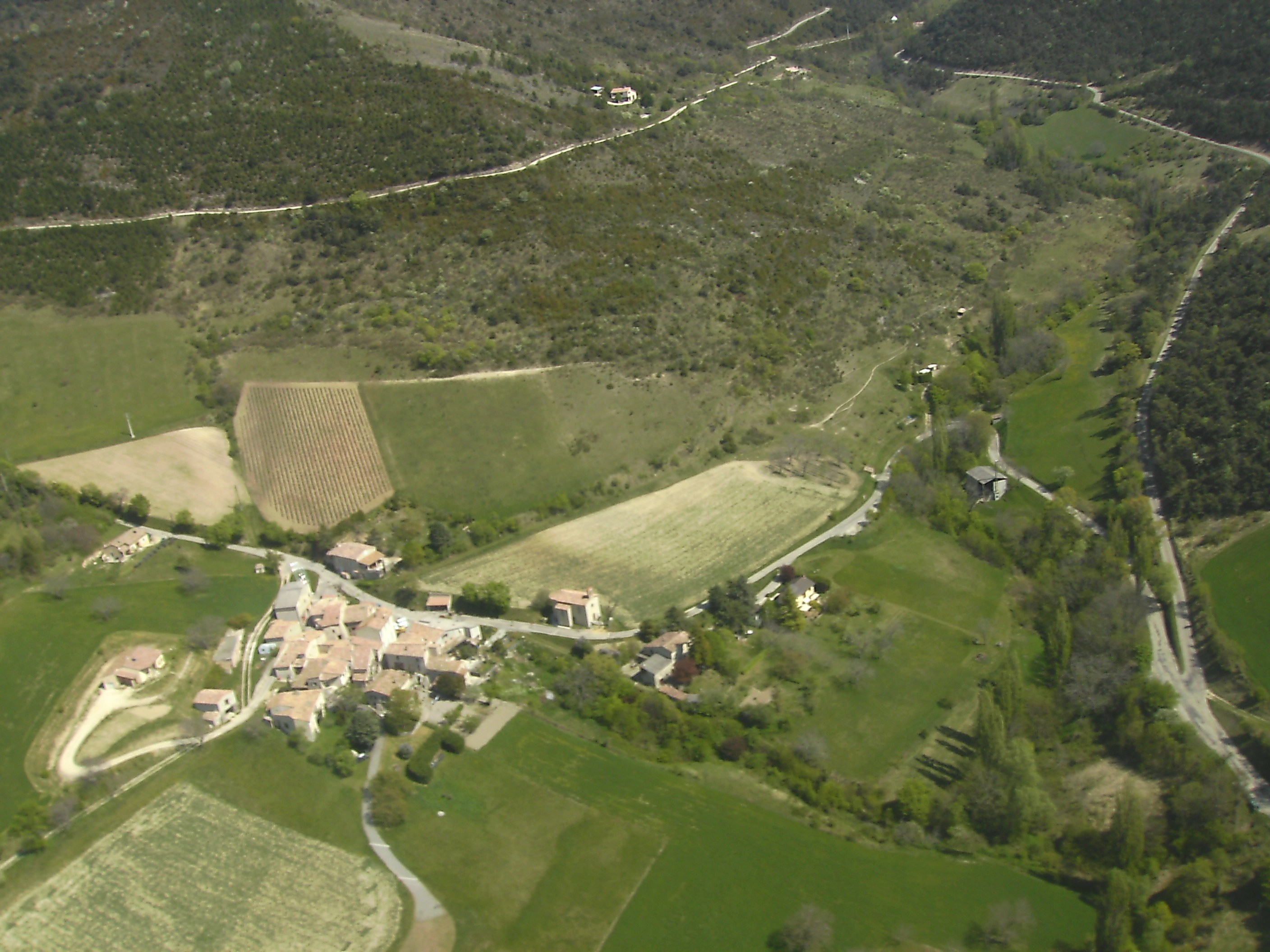
- An aerial view of Eygluy-Escoulin
- Location of Eygluy-Escoulin
- Location within France Location within Auvergne-Rhône-Alpes
- Coordinates: 44°47′24″N 5°11′46″E
- Country: France
- Region: Auvergne-Rhône-Alpes
- Department: Drôme
- Arrondissement: Die
- Canton: Le Diois
- Intercommunality: Val de Drôme en Biovallée

Government
  - Mayor (2020–2026): Roland Filz
- Area^{1}: 26.53 km^{2} (10.24 sq mi)
- Highest elevation: 1,342 m (4,403 ft)
- Lowest elevation: 350 m (1,150 ft)
- Population (2023): 61
  - Density: 2.3/km^{2} (6.0/sq mi)
- Time zone: UTC+01:00 (CET)
  - Summer (DST): UTC+02:00 (CEST)
- INSEE/Postal code: 26128 /26400
- ^{1} French Land Register data, which excludes lakes, ponds, glaciers > 1 km^{2} (0.386 sq mi or 247 acres) and river estuaries.

Eygluy-Escoulin (French pronunciation: [ɛɡlɥi ɛskulɛ̃]; Occitan: Aiglui e l'Escolin) is a commune of the Drôme department in the Auvergne-Rhône-Alpes region in southeastern France. It consists of two settlements in parallel valleys separated by hills of the southern Vercours, these being Eygluy and the larger settlement of l'Escoulin.

== Population ==
Historical population
| Year | Pop. | ±% p.a. |
|---|---|---|
| 1968 | 64 | — |
| 1975 | 42 | −5.84% |
| 1982 | 57 | +4.46% |
| 1990 | 40 | −4.33% |
| 1999 | 59 | +4.41% |
| 2007 | 67 | +1.60% |
| 2012 | 57 | −3.18% |
| 2017 | 67 | +3.29% |
| 2023 | 61 | −1.55% |
Source: INSEE

== See also ==
- Communes of the Drôme department
