= Rimon-et-Savel =

- Commune
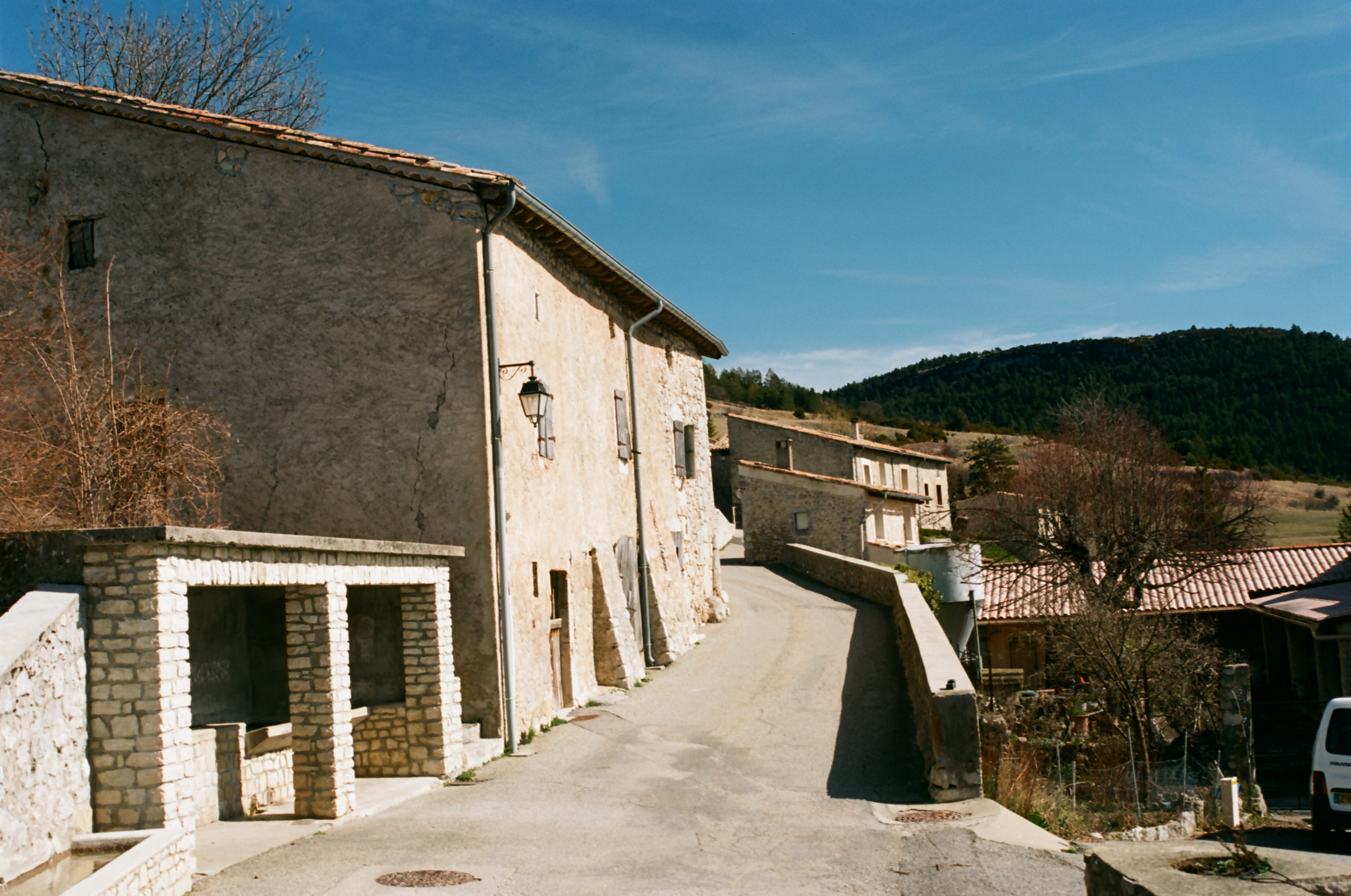
- The village centre of Rimon
- Location of Rimon-et-Savel
- Location within France Location within Auvergne-Rhône-Alpes
- Coordinates: 44°39′51″N 5°18′29″E
- Country: France
- Region: Auvergne-Rhône-Alpes
- Department: Drôme
- Arrondissement: Die
- Canton: Le Diois

Government
  - Mayor (2020–2026): Marcel Bonnard
- Area^{1}: 12.31 km^{2} (4.75 sq mi)
- Elevation: 1,030 m (3,380 ft)
- Highest elevation: 1,339 m (4,393 ft)
- Lowest elevation: 360 m (1,180 ft)
- Population (2023): 22
  - Density: 1.8/km^{2} (4.6/sq mi)
- Time zone: UTC+01:00 (CET)
  - Summer (DST): UTC+02:00 (CEST)
- INSEE/Postal code: 26266 /26340
- ^{1} French Land Register data, which excludes lakes, ponds, glaciers > 1 km^{2} (0.386 sq mi or 247 acres) and river estuaries.

Rimon-et-Savel (French pronunciation: [ʁimɔ̃ e savɛl]; Occitan: Rimont e Savèl) is a commune in the Drôme department in southeastern France.

== Population ==
Historical population
Year	Pop.	±% p.a.
1968	32	—
1975	32	+0.00%
1982	26	−2.92%
1990	26	+0.00%
1999	29	+1.22%
2007	31	+0.84%
2012	32	+0.64%
2017	27	−3.34%
2023	22	−3.36%
Source: INSEE

== See also ==
- Communes of the Drôme department
