= Aubenasson =

- Commune
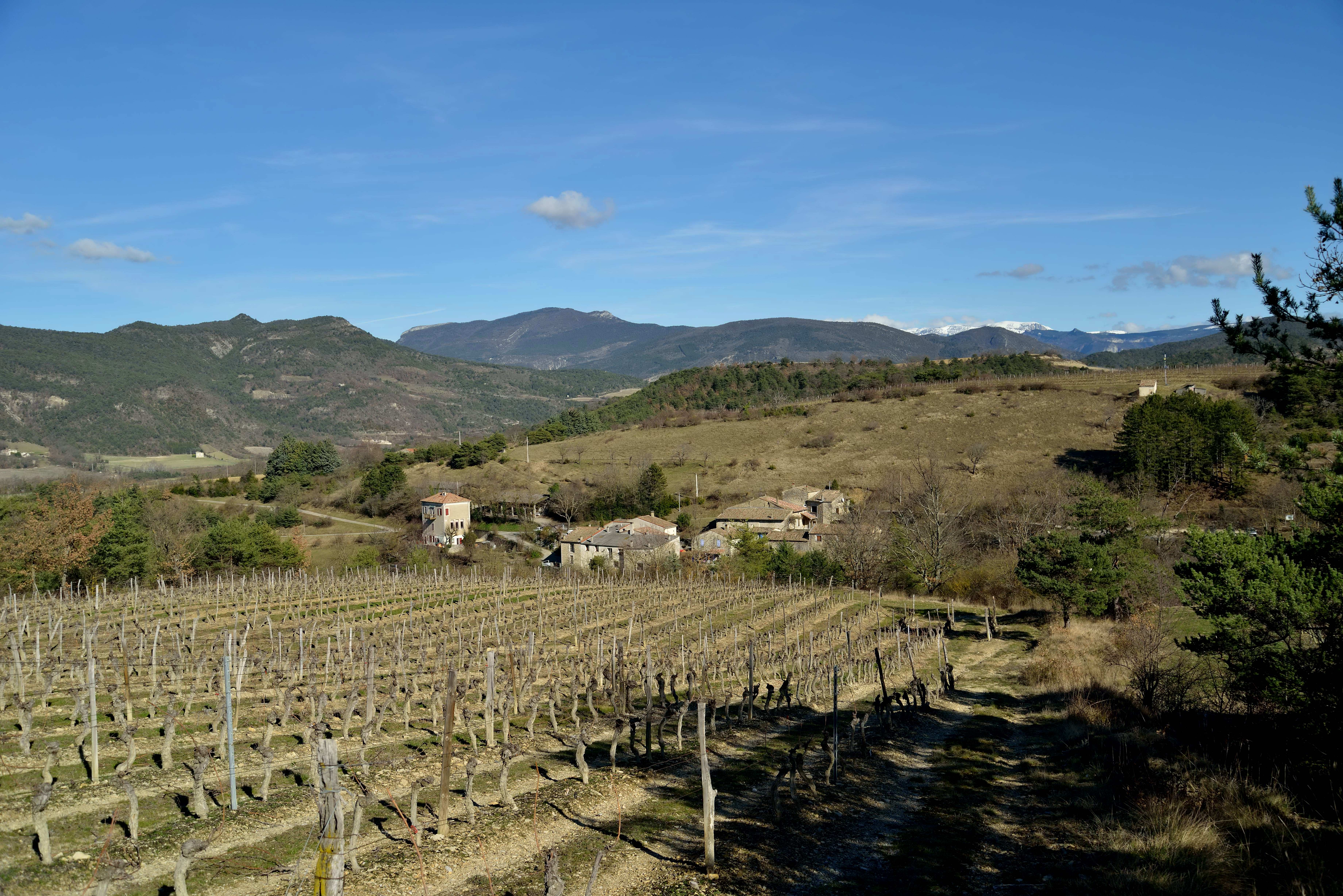
- A general view of the village of Aubenasson
- Location of Aubenasson
- Location within France Location within Auvergne-Rhône-Alpes
- Coordinates: 44°41′11″N 5°08′24″E
- Country: France
- Region: Auvergne-Rhône-Alpes
- Department: Drôme
- Arrondissement: Die
- Canton: Le Diois
- Intercommunality: Crestois et Pays de Saillans Cœur de Drôme

Government
  - Mayor (2022–2026): Pascal Abel-Coindoz
- Area^{1}: 6.69 km^{2} (2.58 sq mi)
- Highest elevation: 1,127 m (3,698 ft)
- Lowest elevation: 224 m (735 ft)
- Population (2023): 74
  - Density: 11/km^{2} (29/sq mi)
- Time zone: UTC+01:00 (CET)
  - Summer (DST): UTC+02:00 (CEST)
- INSEE/Postal code: 26015 /26340
- ^{1} French Land Register data, which excludes lakes, ponds, glaciers > 1 km^{2} (0.386 sq mi or 247 acres) and river estuaries.

Aubenasson (French pronunciation: [obnasɔ̃]) is a commune in the Drôme department in southeastern France.

== Population ==
Historical population
Year	Pop.	±% p.a.
1968	53	—
1975	46	−2.00%
1982	38	−2.69%
1990	28	−3.75%
1999	30	+0.77%
2007	62	+9.50%
2012	67	+1.56%
2017	72	+1.45%
2023	74	+0.46%
Source: INSEE

== See also ==
- Communes of the Drôme department
