= Saint-Dizier-en-Diois =

- Commune
- Location of Saint-Dizier-en-Diois
- Location within France Location within Auvergne-Rhône-Alpes
- Coordinates: 44°30′54″N 5°28′40″E
- Country: France
- Region: Auvergne-Rhône-Alpes
- Department: Drôme
- Arrondissement: Die
- Canton: Le Diois
- Intercommunality: Diois

Government
  - Mayor (2020–2026): Robert Delage
- Area^{1}: 13.94 km^{2} (5.38 sq mi)
- Elevation: 1,050 m (3,440 ft)
- Highest elevation: 1,480 m (4,860 ft)
- Lowest elevation: 878 m (2,881 ft)
- Population (2023): 45
  - Density: 3.2/km^{2} (8.4/sq mi)
- Time zone: UTC+01:00 (CET)
  - Summer (DST): UTC+02:00 (CEST)
- INSEE/Postal code: 26300 /26310
- ^{1} French Land Register data, which excludes lakes, ponds, glaciers > 1 km^{2} (0.386 sq mi or 247 acres) and river estuaries.

Saint-Dizier-en-Diois (French pronunciation: [sɛ̃ dizje ɑ̃ diwa]; Vivaro-Alpine: Sant Disier de Diés) is a commune in the Drôme department in southeastern France.

== Population ==
Historical population
Year	Pop.	±% p.a.
1968	49	—
1975	47	−0.59%
1982	47	+0.00%
1990	36	−3.28%
1999	25	−3.97%
2007	35	+4.30%
2012	36	+0.57%
2017	48	+5.92%
2023	45	−1.07%
Source: INSEE

== See also ==
- Communes of the Drôme department
