= Beaurières =

- Commune
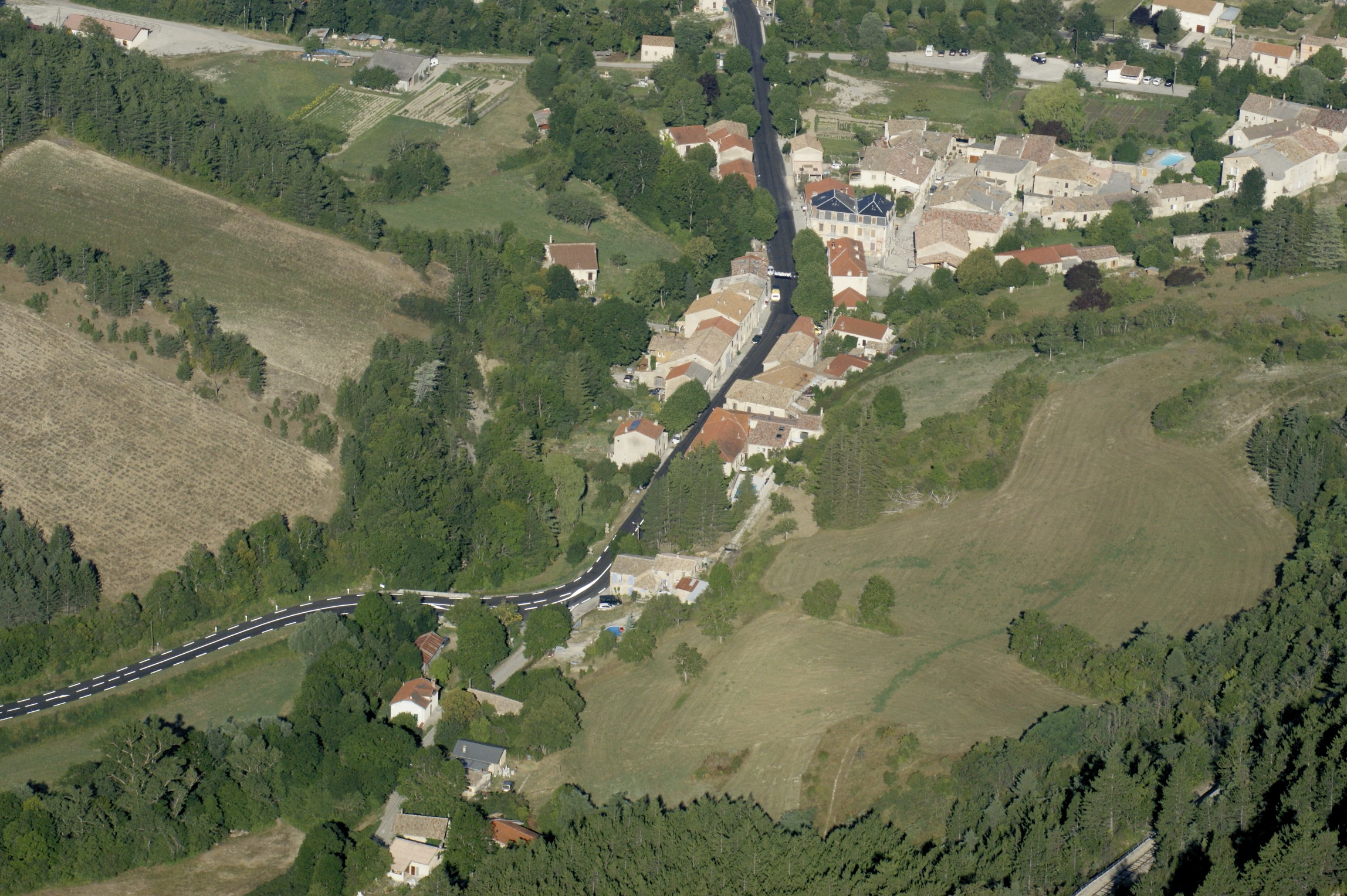
- An aerial view of Beaurières in 2010
- Location of Beaurières
- Location within France Location within Auvergne-Rhône-Alpes
- Coordinates: 44°34′18″N 5°33′34″E
- Country: France
- Region: Auvergne-Rhône-Alpes
- Department: Drôme
- Arrondissement: Die
- Canton: Le Diois
- Intercommunality: Diois

Government
  - Mayor (2020–2026): Gabriella Molina
- Area^{1}: 24.58 km^{2} (9.49 sq mi)
- Highest elevation: 1,440 m (4,720 ft)
- Lowest elevation: 641 m (2,103 ft)
- Population (2023): 82
  - Density: 3.3/km^{2} (8.6/sq mi)
- Time zone: UTC+01:00 (CET)
  - Summer (DST): UTC+02:00 (CEST)
- INSEE/Postal code: 26040 /26310
- ^{1} French Land Register data, which excludes lakes, ponds, glaciers > 1 km^{2} (0.386 sq mi or 247 acres) and river estuaries.

Beaurières (French pronunciation: [boʁjɛʁ]; Occitan: Baurièras) is a commune in the Drôme department in southeastern France.

== Population ==
Historical population
Year	Pop.	±% p.a.
1968	160	—
1975	101	−6.36%
1982	114	+1.74%
1990	97	−2.00%
1999	65	−4.35%
2007	85	+3.41%
2012	86	+0.23%
2017	67	−4.87%
2023	82	+3.42%
Source: INSEE

== See also ==
- Communes of the Drôme department
