= Brette =

- Commune
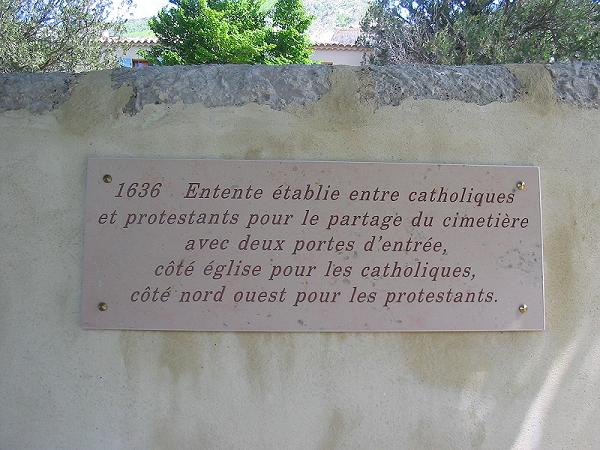
- A cemetery plaque in Brette
- Location of Brette
- Location within France Location within Auvergne-Rhône-Alpes
- Coordinates: 44°35′19″N 5°18′41″E
- Country: France
- Region: Auvergne-Rhône-Alpes
- Department: Drôme
- Arrondissement: Die
- Canton: Le Diois
- Intercommunality: Diois

Government
  - Mayor (2020–2026): Hervé Reynaud
- Area^{1}: 15.50 km^{2} (5.98 sq mi)
- Highest elevation: 1,605 m (5,266 ft)
- Lowest elevation: 514 m (1,686 ft)
- Population (2023): 29
  - Density: 1.9/km^{2} (4.8/sq mi)
- Time zone: UTC+01:00 (CET)
  - Summer (DST): UTC+02:00 (CEST)
- INSEE/Postal code: 26062 /26340
- ^{1} French Land Register data, which excludes lakes, ponds, glaciers > 1 km^{2} (0.386 sq mi or 247 acres) and river estuaries.

Brette (French pronunciation: [bʁɛt]) is a commune in the Drôme department, administrative region of Auvergne-Rhône-Alpes, France.

== Population ==
Historical population
Year	Pop.	±% p.a.
1968	45	—
1975	31	−5.18%
1982	32	+0.45%
1990	27	−2.10%
1999	32	+1.91%
2007	31	−0.40%
2012	35	+2.46%
2017	40	+2.71%
2023	29	−5.22%
Source: INSEE

== See also ==
- Communes of the Drôme department
