= Saint-Roman =

- Commune
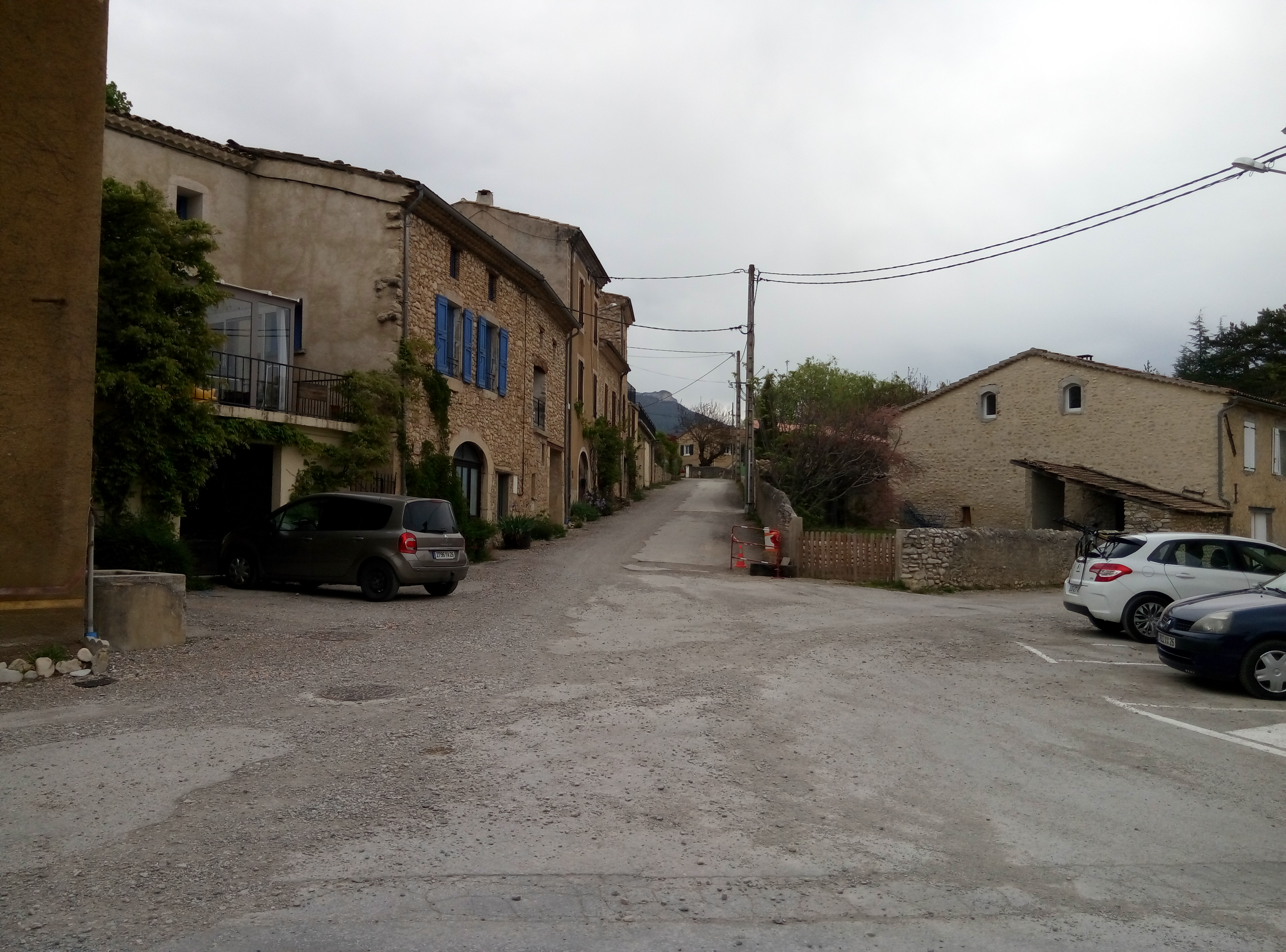
- Location of Saint-Roman
- Location within France Location within Auvergne-Rhône-Alpes
- Coordinates: 44°41′31″N 5°25′59″E
- Country: France
- Region: Auvergne-Rhône-Alpes
- Department: Drôme
- Arrondissement: Die
- Canton: Le Diois
- Intercommunality: Diois

Government
  - Mayor (2020–2026): Catherine Pellini
- Area^{1}: 7.1 km^{2} (2.7 sq mi)
- Elevation: 515 m (1,690 ft)
- Highest elevation: 1,167 m (3,829 ft)
- Lowest elevation: 458 m (1,503 ft)
- Population (2023): 235
  - Density: 33/km^{2} (86/sq mi)
- Time zone: UTC+01:00 (CET)
  - Summer (DST): UTC+02:00 (CEST)
- INSEE/Postal code: 26327 /26410
- ^{1} French Land Register data, which excludes lakes, ponds, glaciers > 1 km^{2} (0.386 sq mi or 247 acres) and river estuaries.

Saint-Roman (French pronunciation: [sɛ̃ ʁɔmɑ̃]; Occitan: Sant Roman) is a commune in the Drôme department in southeastern France.

== Population ==
Historical population
Year	Pop.	±% p.a.
1968	117	—
1975	119	+0.24%
1982	145	+2.86%
1990	160	+1.24%
1999	136	−1.79%
2007	159	+1.97%
2012	164	+0.62%
2017	201	+4.15%
2023	235	+2.64%
Source: INSEE

== See also ==
- Communes of the Drôme department

Saint Roman in Diois
