= Boulc =

- Commune
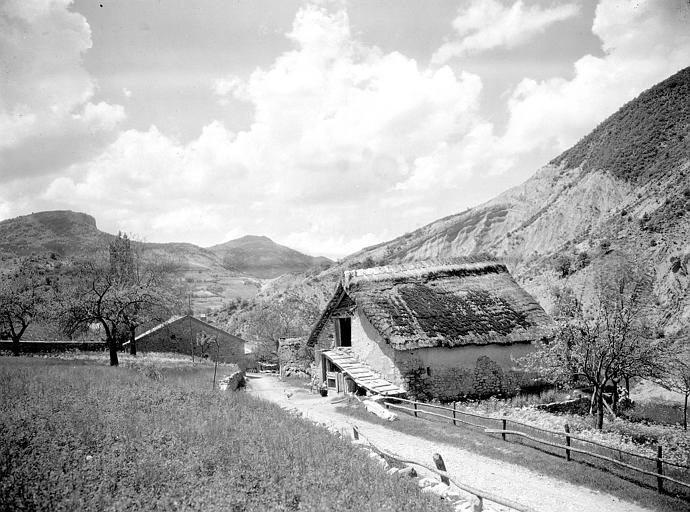
- A farm building in Bonneval, during the 1920s
- Location of Boulc
- Location within France Location within Auvergne-Rhône-Alpes
- Coordinates: 44°38′55″N 5°34′03″E
- Country: France
- Region: Auvergne-Rhône-Alpes
- Department: Drôme
- Arrondissement: Die
- Canton: Le Diois
- Intercommunality: Diois

Government
  - Mayor (2020–2026): Olivier Tourreng
- Area^{1}: 57.35 km^{2} (22.14 sq mi)
- Highest elevation: 1,854 m (6,083 ft)
- Lowest elevation: 623 m (2,044 ft)
- Population (2023): 154
  - Density: 2.69/km^{2} (6.95/sq mi)
- Time zone: UTC+01:00 (CET)
  - Summer (DST): UTC+02:00 (CEST)
- INSEE/Postal code: 26055 /26410
- ^{1} French Land Register data, which excludes lakes, ponds, glaciers > 1 km^{2} (0.386 sq mi or 247 acres) and river estuaries.

Boulc is a commune in the Drôme department in southeastern France.

== Population ==
Historical population
Year	Pop.	±% p.a.
1968	107	—
1975	126	+2.36%
1982	104	−2.70%
1990	74	−4.16%
1999	101	+3.52%
2007	116	+1.75%
2012	129	+2.15%
2017	134	+0.76%
2023	154	+2.35%
Source: INSEE

== See also ==
- Communes of the Drôme department
