= Montmaur-en-Diois =

- Commune
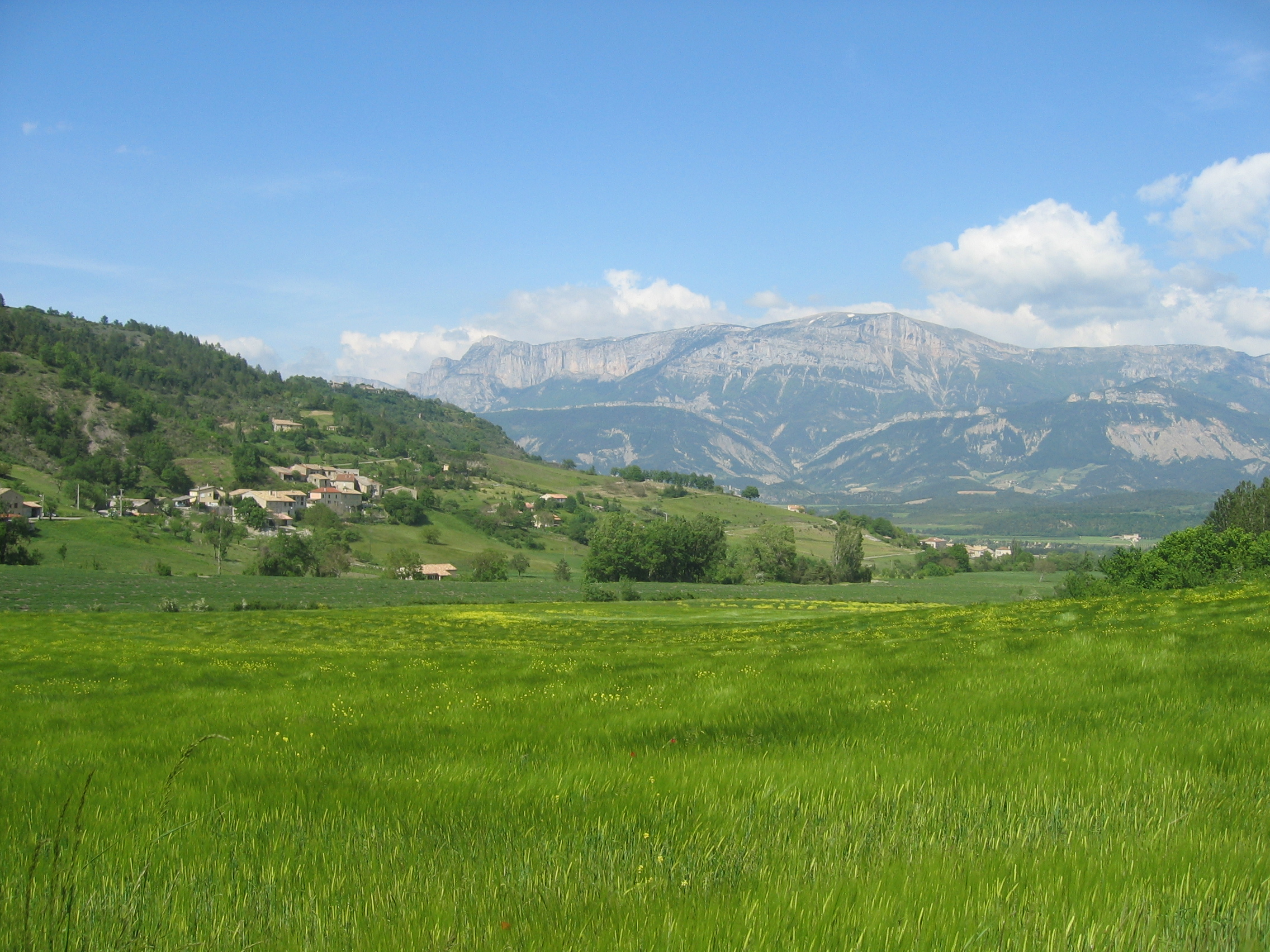
- A general view of Montmaur-en-Diois
- Location of Montmaur-en-Diois
- Location within France Location within Auvergne-Rhône-Alpes
- Coordinates: 44°40′37″N 5°22′48″E
- Country: France
- Region: Auvergne-Rhône-Alpes
- Department: Drôme
- Arrondissement: Die
- Canton: Le Diois
- Intercommunality: Diois

Government
  - Mayor (2020–2026): Claire Gery
- Area^{1}: 12.8 km^{2} (4.9 sq mi)
- Highest elevation: 1,274 m (4,180 ft)
- Lowest elevation: 459 m (1,506 ft)
- Population (2023): 102
  - Density: 7.97/km^{2} (20.6/sq mi)
- Time zone: UTC+01:00 (CET)
  - Summer (DST): UTC+02:00 (CEST)
- INSEE/Postal code: 26205 /26150
- ^{1} French Land Register data, which excludes lakes, ponds, glaciers > 1 km^{2} (0.386 sq mi or 247 acres) and river estuaries.

Montmaur-en-Diois (French pronunciation: [mɔ̃mɔʁ ɑ̃ diwa]; Occitan: Montmaur) is a commune in the Drôme department in southeastern France.

== Population ==
Historical population
Year	Pop.	±% p.a.
1968	60	—
1975	59	−0.24%
1982	58	−0.24%
1990	79	+3.94%
1999	79	+0.00%
2007	80	+0.16%
2012	80	+0.00%
2017	83	+0.74%
2023	102	+3.50%
Source: INSEE

== See also ==
- Communes of the Drôme department
