= Glandage =

- Commune
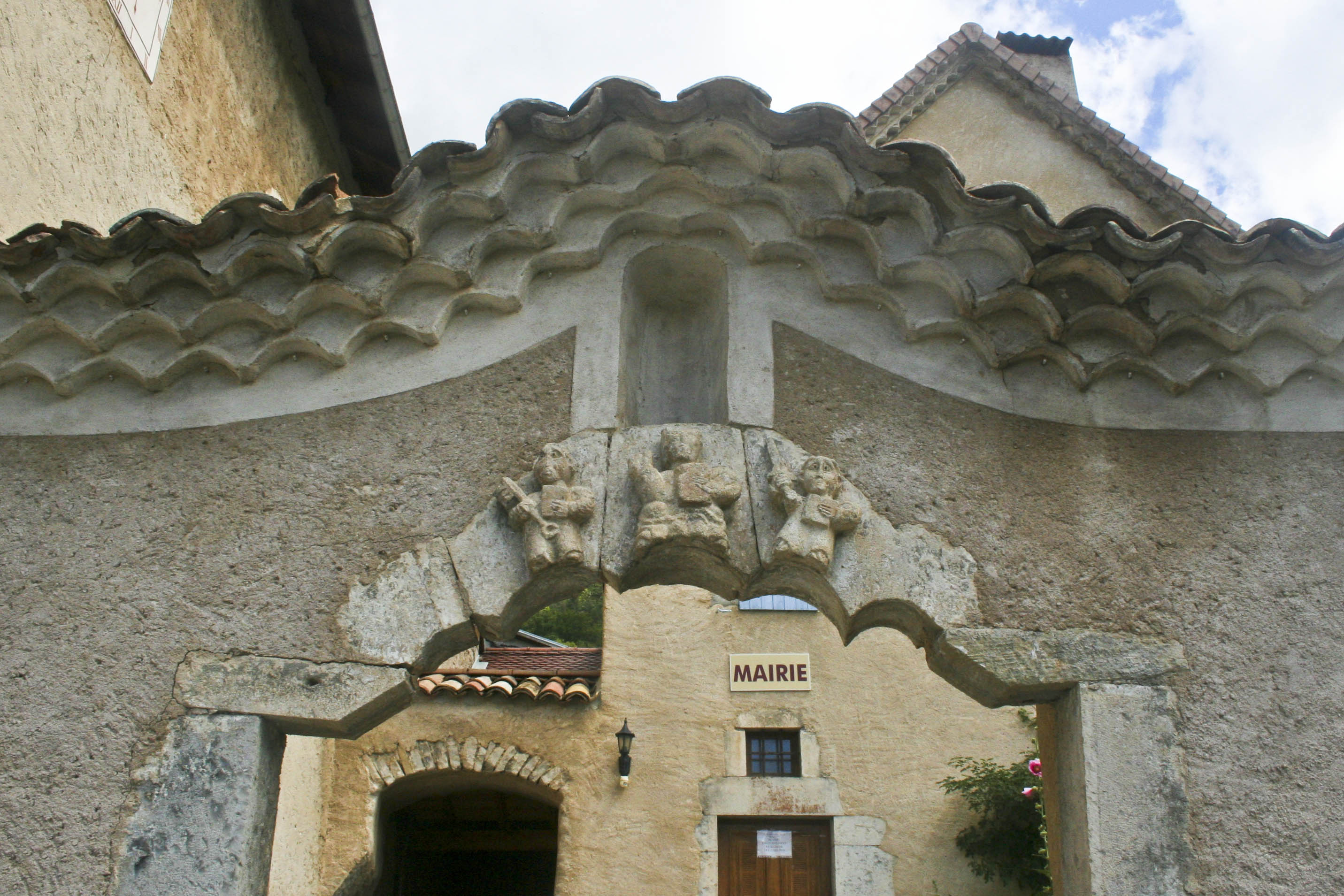
- Town hall
- Location of Glandage
- Location within France Location within Auvergne-Rhône-Alpes
- Coordinates: 44°41′20″N 5°35′56″E
- Country: France
- Region: Auvergne-Rhône-Alpes
- Department: Drôme
- Arrondissement: Die
- Canton: Le Diois
- Intercommunality: Diois

Government
  - Mayor (2020–2026): Marie-Claude Orand
- Area^{1}: 52.11 km^{2} (20.12 sq mi)
- Highest elevation: 2,045 m (6,709 ft)
- Lowest elevation: 717 m (2,352 ft)
- Population (2023): 114
  - Density: 2.19/km^{2} (5.67/sq mi)
- Demonym: glandageois
- Time zone: UTC+01:00 (CET)
  - Summer (DST): UTC+02:00 (CEST)
- INSEE/Postal code: 26142 /26410
- ^{1} French Land Register data, which excludes lakes, ponds, glaciers > 1 km^{2} (0.386 sq mi or 247 acres) and river estuaries.

Glandage (French pronunciation: [ɡlɑ̃daʒ]) is a commune in the Drôme department in southeastern France.

== Population ==
Historical population
Year	Pop.	±% p.a.
1968	99	—
1975	83	−2.49%
1982	121	+5.53%
1990	111	−1.07%
1999	84	−3.05%
2007	90	+0.87%
2012	96	+1.30%
2017	113	+3.31%
2023	114	+0.15%
Source: INSEE

== See also ==
- Communes of the Drôme department
- Parc naturel régional du Vercors
