= Vachères-en-Quint =

- Commune
- Location of Vachères-en-Quint
- Location within France Location within Auvergne-Rhône-Alpes
- Coordinates: 44°47′N 5°16′E
- Country: France
- Region: Auvergne-Rhône-Alpes
- Department: Drôme
- Arrondissement: Die
- Canton: Le Diois
- Intercommunality: Diois

Government
  - Mayor (2020–2026): Jacques Guilleminot
- Area^{1}: 5.14 km^{2} (1.98 sq mi)
- Elevation: 633 m (2,077 ft)
- Highest elevation: 926 m (3,038 ft)
- Lowest elevation: 422 m (1,385 ft)
- Population (2023): 38
  - Density: 7.4/km^{2} (19/sq mi)
- Time zone: UTC+01:00 (CET)
  - Summer (DST): UTC+02:00 (CEST)
- INSEE/Postal code: 26359 /26150
- ^{1} French Land Register data, which excludes lakes, ponds, glaciers > 1 km^{2} (0.386 sq mi or 247 acres) and river estuaries.

Vachères-en-Quint (French pronunciation: [vaʃɛʁ ɑ̃ kɛ̃]; Occitan: Vachèiras de Quint) is a commune in the Drôme department in southeastern France.

== Population ==
Historical population
Year	Pop.	±% p.a.
1968	20	—
1975	19	−0.73%
1982	23	+2.77%
1990	26	+1.54%
1999	34	+3.03%
2007	31	−1.15%
2012	30	−0.65%
2017	32	+1.30%
2023	38	+2.91%
Source: INSEE

== See also ==
- Communes of the Drôme department
- Parc naturel régional du Vercors
