= Poyols =

- Commune
- Location of Poyols
- Location within France Location within Auvergne-Rhône-Alpes
- Coordinates: 44°36′02″N 5°25′15″E
- Country: France
- Region: Auvergne-Rhône-Alpes
- Department: Drôme
- Arrondissement: Die
- Canton: Le Diois
- Intercommunality: Diois

Government
  - Mayor (2020–2026): Valérie Joubert
- Area^{1}: 13.35 km^{2} (5.15 sq mi)
- Highest elevation: 1,440 m (4,720 ft)
- Lowest elevation: 549 m (1,801 ft)
- Population (2023): 98
  - Density: 7.3/km^{2} (19/sq mi)
- Time zone: UTC+01:00 (CET)
  - Summer (DST): UTC+02:00 (CEST)
- INSEE/Postal code: 26253 /26310
- ^{1} French Land Register data, which excludes lakes, ponds, glaciers > 1 km^{2} (0.386 sq mi or 247 acres) and river estuaries.

Poyols is a commune in the Drôme department in southeastern France.

== Population ==
Historical population
Year	Pop.	±% p.a.
1968	60	—
1975	52	−2.02%
1982	57	+1.32%
1990	57	+0.00%
1999	65	+1.47%
2007	77	+2.14%
2012	69	−2.17%
2017	70	+0.29%
2023	98	+5.77%
Source: INSEE

== See also ==
- Communes of the Drôme department
