= Romeyer =

- Commune
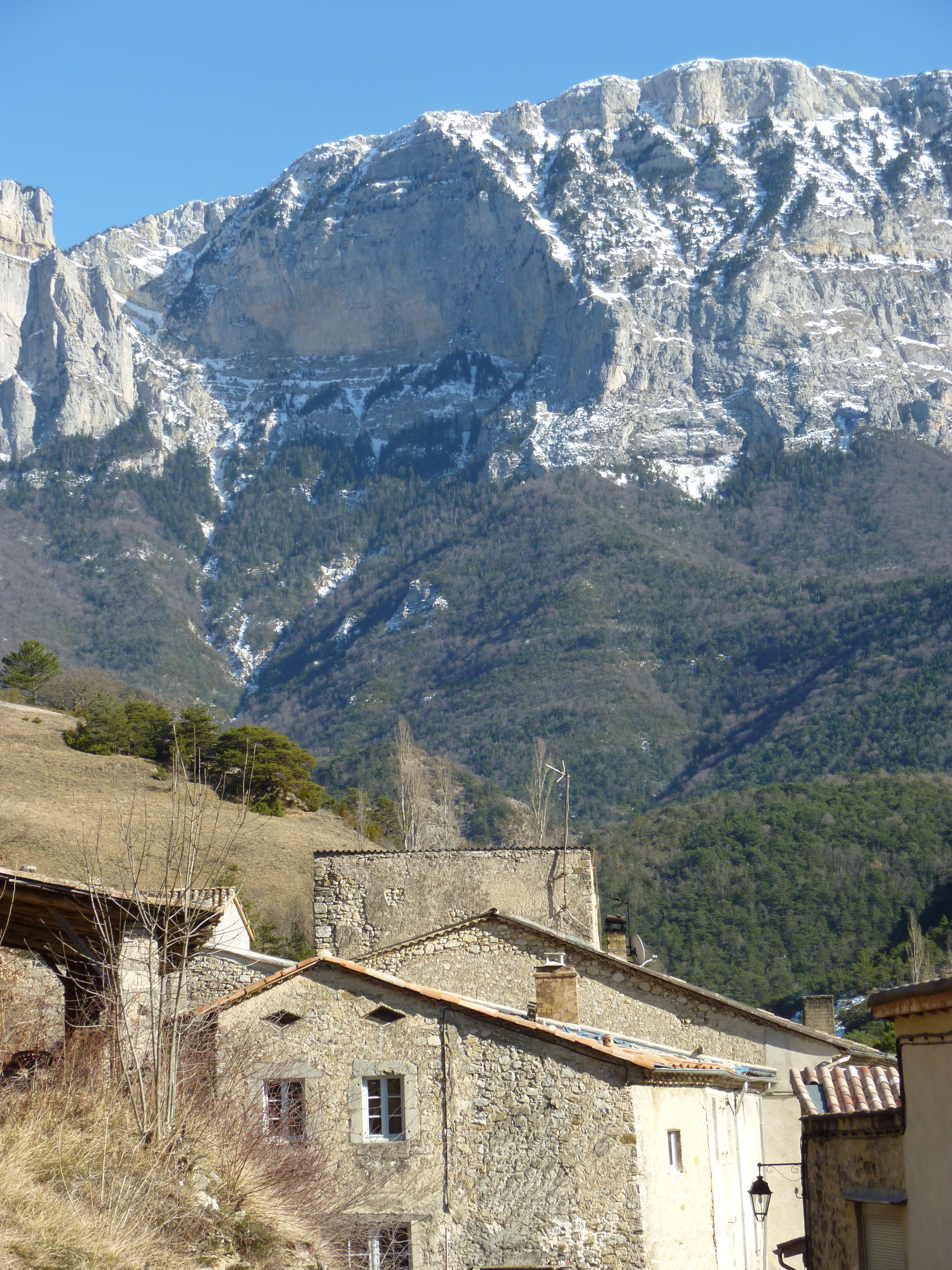
- The village of Romeyer
- Location of Romeyer
- Location within France Location within Auvergne-Rhône-Alpes
- Coordinates: 44°46′49″N 5°24′34″E
- Country: France
- Region: Auvergne-Rhône-Alpes
- Department: Drôme
- Arrondissement: Die
- Canton: Le Diois
- Intercommunality: Diois

Government
  - Mayor (2020–2026): Anne-Line Guironnet
- Area^{1}: 41.46 km^{2} (16.01 sq mi)
- Elevation: 530 m (1,740 ft)
- Highest elevation: 2,000 m (6,600 ft)
- Lowest elevation: 478 m (1,568 ft)
- Population (2023): 233
  - Density: 5.62/km^{2} (14.6/sq mi)
- Time zone: UTC+01:00 (CET)
  - Summer (DST): UTC+02:00 (CEST)
- INSEE/Postal code: 26282 /26150
- ^{1} French Land Register data, which excludes lakes, ponds, glaciers > 1 km^{2} (0.386 sq mi or 247 acres) and river estuaries.

Romeyer (French pronunciation: [ʁɔmɛje]; Occitan: Romeièr) is a commune in the Drôme department in southeastern France.

== Population ==
Historical population
Year	Pop.	±% p.a.
1968	150	—
1975	129	−2.13%
1982	113	−1.87%
1990	114	+0.11%
1999	154	+3.40%
2007	208	+3.83%
2012	210	+0.19%
2017	197	−1.27%
2023	233	+2.84%
Source: INSEE

== See also ==
- Communes of the Drôme department
- Parc naturel régional du Vercors
