= Pontaix =

- Commune
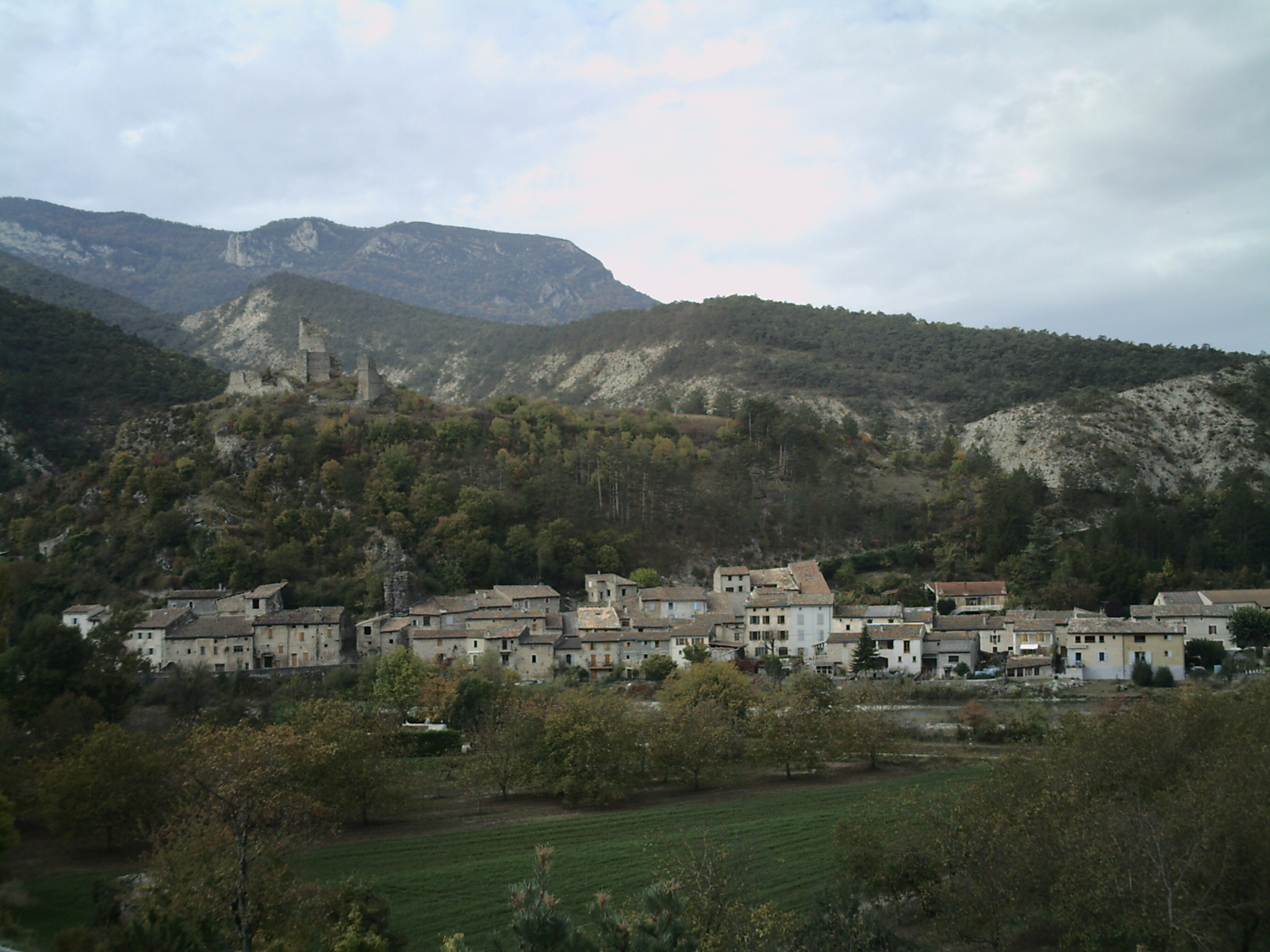
- The village of Pontaix, with the ruins of the château
- Location of Pontaix
- Location within France Location within Auvergne-Rhône-Alpes
- Coordinates: 44°45′03″N 5°15′53″E
- Country: France
- Region: Auvergne-Rhône-Alpes
- Department: Drôme
- Arrondissement: Die
- Canton: Le Diois
- Intercommunality: Diois

Government
  - Mayor (2020–2026): Dominique Vinay
- Area^{1}: 19.68 km^{2} (7.60 sq mi)
- Highest elevation: 1,000 m (3,300 ft)
- Lowest elevation: 315 m (1,033 ft)
- Population (2023): 181
  - Density: 9.20/km^{2} (23.8/sq mi)
- Time zone: UTC+01:00 (CET)
  - Summer (DST): UTC+02:00 (CEST)
- INSEE/Postal code: 26248 /26150
- ^{1} French Land Register data, which excludes lakes, ponds, glaciers > 1 km^{2} (0.386 sq mi or 247 acres) and river estuaries.

Pontaix is a commune in the Drôme department in southeastern France.

== Population ==
Historical population
Year	Pop.	±% p.a.
1968	163	—
1975	136	−2.55%
1982	151	+1.51%
1990	151	+0.00%
1999	136	−1.16%
2007	168	+2.68%
2012	164	−0.48%
2017	168	+0.48%
2023	181	+1.25%
Source: INSEE

== See also ==
- Communes of the Drôme department
