= Pradelle, Drôme =

Pradelle
- Commune
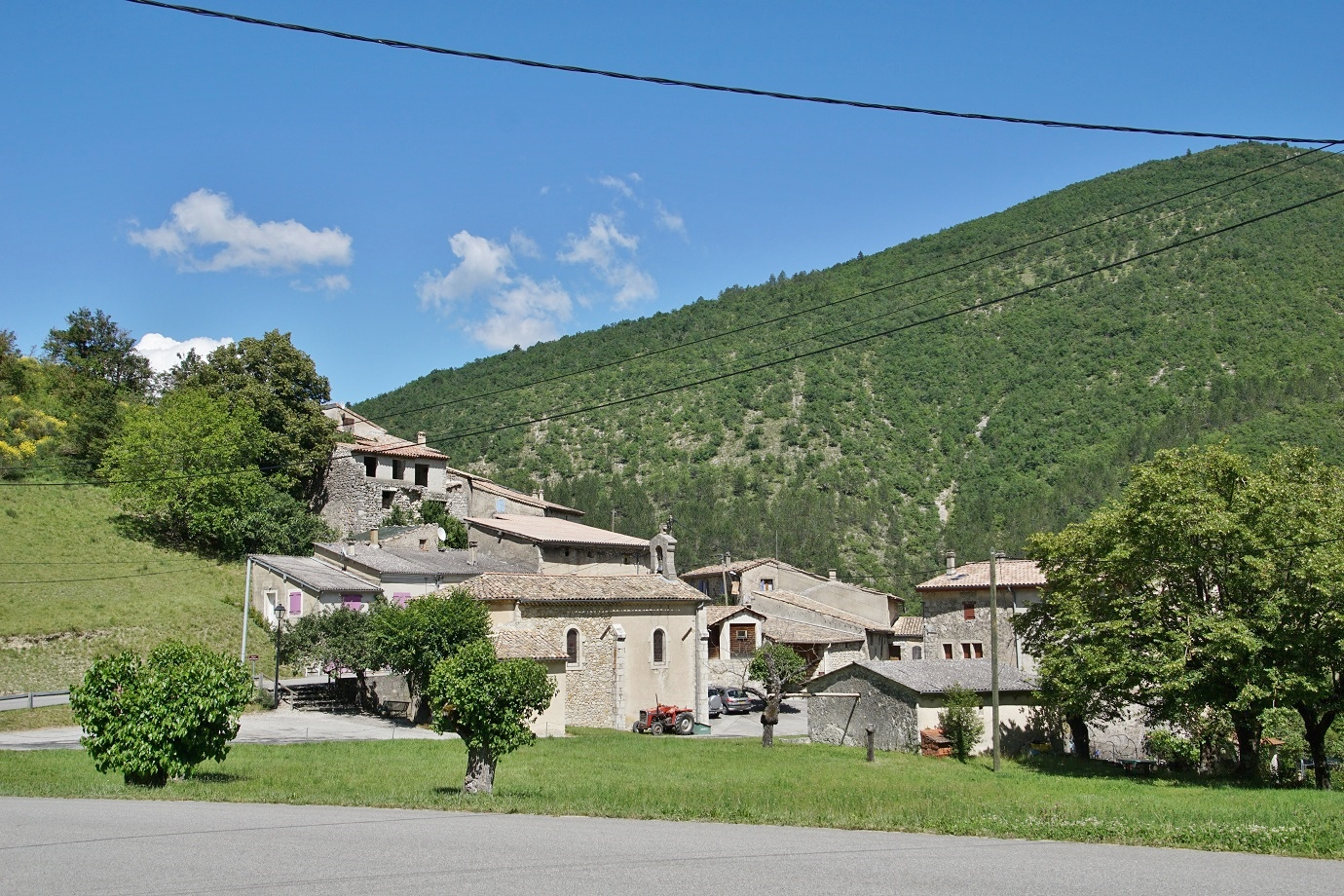
- Location of Pradelle
- Location within France Location within Auvergne-Rhône-Alpes
- Coordinates: 44°36′32″N 5°17′34″E
- Country: France
- Region: Auvergne-Rhône-Alpes
- Department: Drôme
- Arrondissement: Die
- Canton: Le Diois
- Intercommunality: Diois

Government
  - Mayor (2020–2026): Gaëlle Vincent
- Area^{1}: 12.92 km^{2} (4.99 sq mi)
- Highest elevation: 1,209 m (3,967 ft)
- Lowest elevation: 409 m (1,342 ft)
- Population (2023): 26
  - Density: 2.0/km^{2} (5.2/sq mi)
- Time zone: UTC+01:00 (CET)
  - Summer (DST): UTC+02:00 (CEST)
- INSEE/Postal code: 26254 /26340
- ^{1} French Land Register data, which excludes lakes, ponds, glaciers > 1 km^{2} (0.386 sq mi or 247 acres) and river estuaries.

Pradelle (French pronunciation: [pʁadɛl]; Occitan: Pradèla) is a commune in the Drôme department in southeastern France.

== Population ==
Historical population
Year	Pop.	±% p.a.
1968	38	—
1975	40	+0.74%
1982	38	−0.73%
1990	30	−2.91%
1999	26	−1.58%
2007	18	−4.49%
2012	21	+3.13%
2017	18	−3.04%
2023	26	+6.32%
Source: INSEE

== See also ==
- Communes of the Drôme department
