= Gumiane =

- Commune
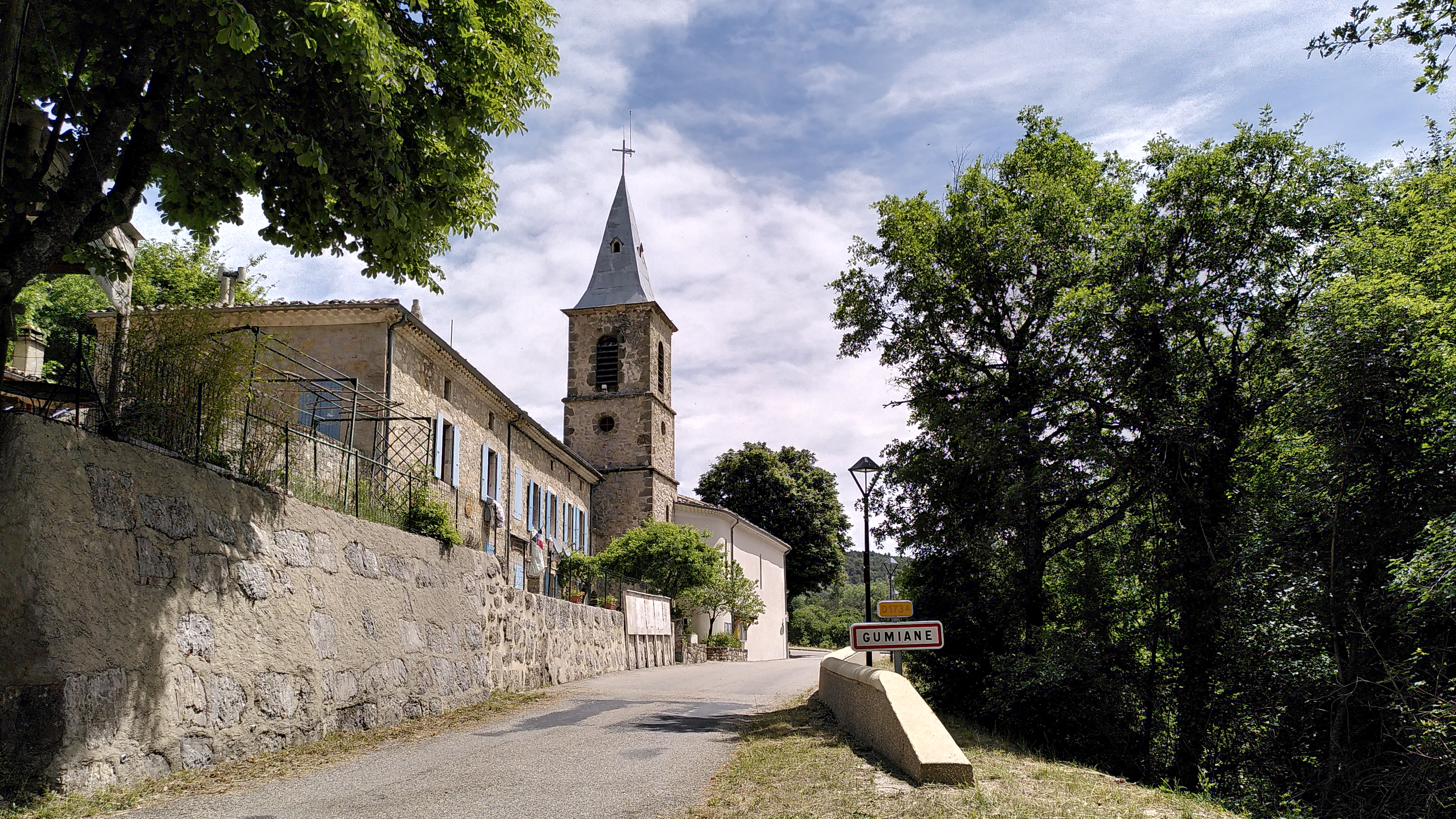
- Location of Gumiane
- Location within France Location within Auvergne-Rhône-Alpes
- Coordinates: 44°30′39″N 5°16′37″E
- Country: France
- Region: Auvergne-Rhône-Alpes
- Department: Drôme
- Arrondissement: Die
- Canton: Le Diois
- Intercommunality: Diois

Government
  - Mayor (2020–2026): Daniel Chauvin
- Area^{1}: 8.92 km^{2} (3.44 sq mi)
- Highest elevation: 1,600 m (5,200 ft)
- Lowest elevation: 632 m (2,073 ft)
- Population (2023): 20
  - Density: 2.2/km^{2} (5.8/sq mi)
- Time zone: UTC+01:00 (CET)
  - Summer (DST): UTC+02:00 (CEST)
- INSEE/Postal code: 26147 /26470
- ^{1} French Land Register data, which excludes lakes, ponds, glaciers > 1 km^{2} (0.386 sq mi or 247 acres) and river estuaries.

Gumiane (French pronunciation: [ɡymjan]; Occitan: Gumiana) is a commune in the Drôme département in southeastern France.

== Population ==
Historical population
Year	Pop.	±% p.a.
1968	50	—
1975	44	−1.81%
1982	43	−0.33%
1990	41	−0.59%
1999	33	−2.38%
2007	28	−2.03%
2012	22	−4.71%
2017	20	−1.89%
2023	20	+0.00%
Source: INSEE

== See also ==
- Communes of the Drôme department
