= Barsac, Drôme =

Barsac
- Commune
- Location of Barsac
- Location within France Location within Auvergne-Rhône-Alpes
- Coordinates: 44°43′54″N 5°17′31″E
- Country: France
- Region: Auvergne-Rhône-Alpes
- Department: Drôme
- Arrondissement: Die
- Canton: Le Diois
- Intercommunality: Diois

Government
  - Mayor (2020–2026): François Gautier
- Area^{1}: 15.58 km^{2} (6.02 sq mi)
- Highest elevation: 1,207 m (3,960 ft)
- Lowest elevation: 305 m (1,001 ft)
- Population (2023): 154
  - Density: 9.88/km^{2} (25.6/sq mi)
- Time zone: UTC+01:00 (CET)
  - Summer (DST): UTC+02:00 (CEST)
- INSEE/Postal code: 26027 /26150
- ^{1} French Land Register data, which excludes lakes, ponds, glaciers > 1 km^{2} (0.386 sq mi or 247 acres) and river estuaries.

Barsac (French pronunciation: [baʁsak]; Occitan: Barçac) is a commune in the Drôme department in southeastern France.

== Population ==
Historical population
Year	Pop.	±% p.a.
1968	135	—
1975	133	−0.21%
1982	111	−2.55%
1990	116	+0.55%
1999	141	+2.19%
2007	166	+2.06%
2012	158	−0.98%
2017	138	−2.67%
2023	154	+1.85%
Source: INSEE

== See also ==
- Communes of the Drôme department
