= Rottier =

- Commune
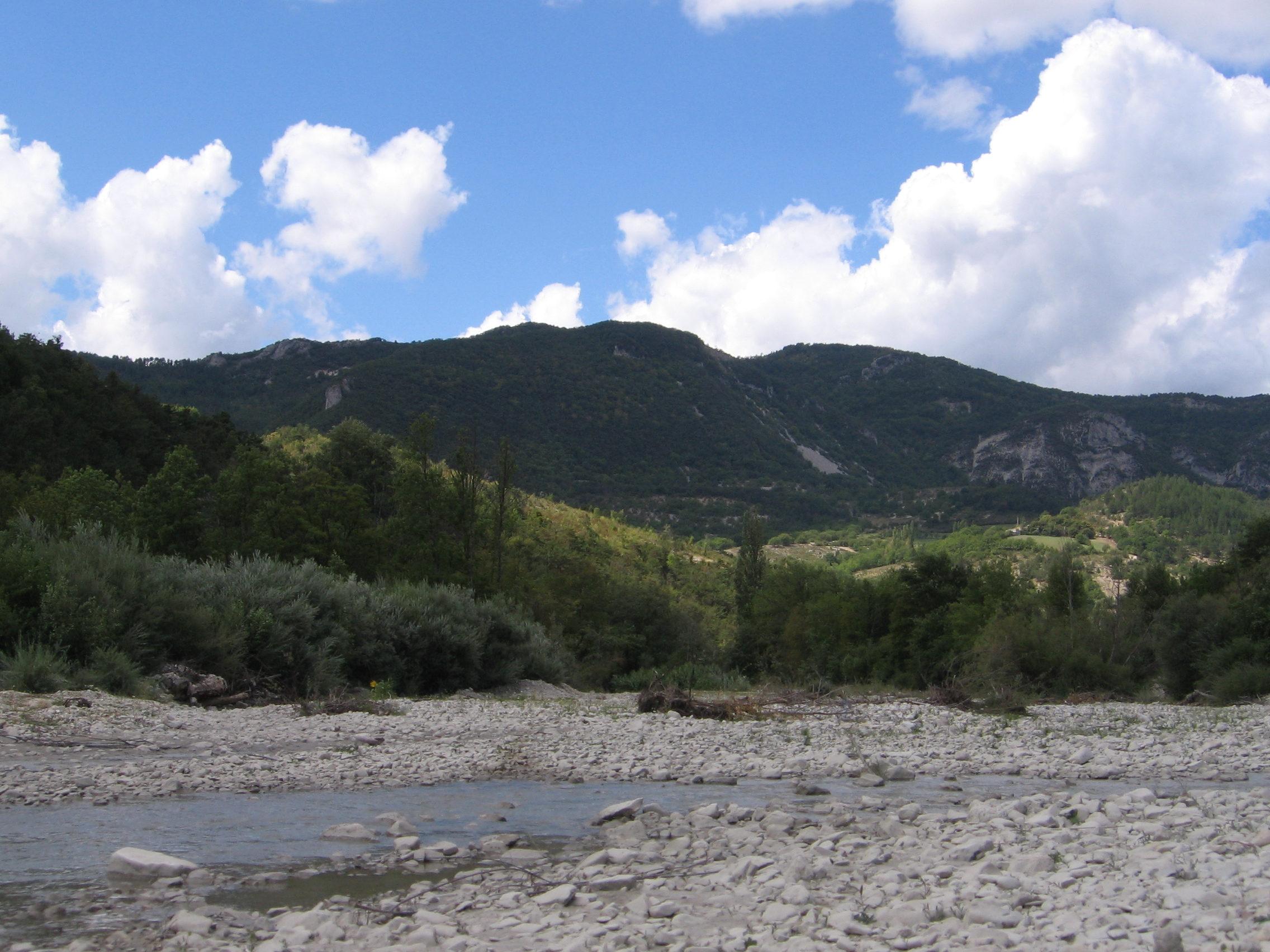
- The Oule river between La Charce and Rottier
- Location of Rottier
- Location within France Location within Auvergne-Rhône-Alpes
- Coordinates: 44°28′31″N 5°24′49″E
- Country: France
- Region: Auvergne-Rhône-Alpes
- Department: Drôme
- Arrondissement: Die
- Canton: Le Diois
- Intercommunality: Diois

Government
  - Mayor (2020–2026): Jean-Pierre Brachet
- Area^{1}: 8.54 km^{2} (3.30 sq mi)
- Elevation: 772 m (2,533 ft)
- Highest elevation: 1,174 m (3,852 ft)
- Lowest elevation: 562 m (1,844 ft)
- Population (2023): 25
  - Density: 2.9/km^{2} (7.6/sq mi)
- Time zone: UTC+01:00 (CET)
  - Summer (DST): UTC+02:00 (CEST)
- INSEE/Postal code: 26283 /26470
- ^{1} French Land Register data, which excludes lakes, ponds, glaciers > 1 km^{2} (0.386 sq mi or 247 acres) and river estuaries.

Rottier (French pronunciation: [ʁɔtje]) is a commune in the Drôme department in southeastern France.

== Population ==
Historical population
Year	Pop.	±% p.a.
1968	50	—
1975	45	−1.49%
1982	39	−2.02%
1990	34	−1.70%
1999	33	−0.33%
2007	30	−1.18%
2012	27	−2.09%
2017	21	−4.90%
2023	25	+2.95%
Source: INSEE

== See also ==
- Communes of the Drôme department
