= Les Prés =

- Commune
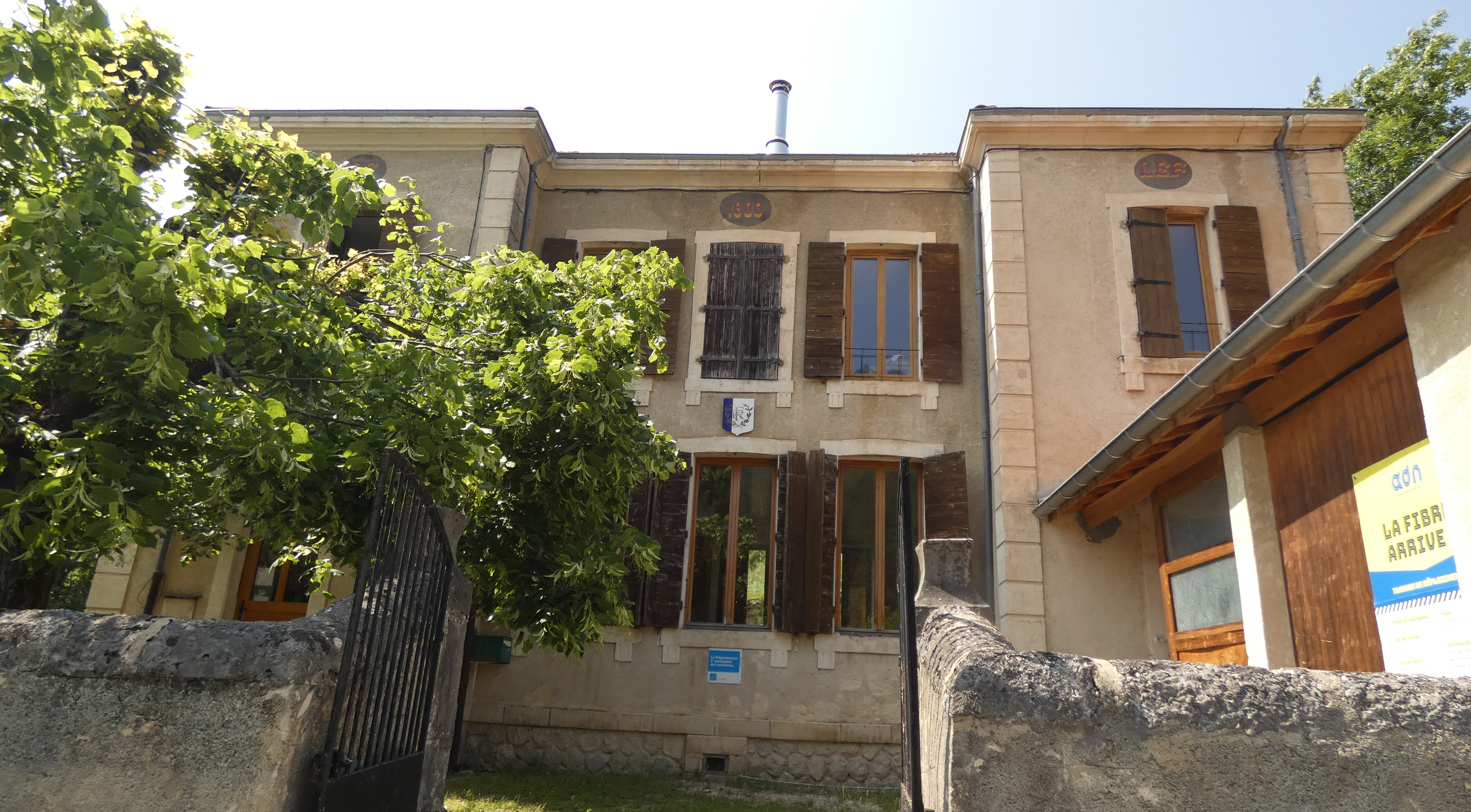
- Les Prés Town hall
- Location of Les Prés
- Location within France Location within Auvergne-Rhône-Alpes
- Coordinates: 44°31′42″N 5°34′46″E
- Country: France
- Region: Auvergne-Rhône-Alpes
- Department: Drôme
- Arrondissement: Die
- Canton: Le Diois
- Intercommunality: Diois

Government
  - Mayor (2020–2026): Gérard De Giorgio
- Area^{1}: 16.6 km^{2} (6.4 sq mi)
- Highest elevation: 1,525 m (5,003 ft)
- Lowest elevation: 701 m (2,300 ft)
- Population (2023): 31
  - Density: 1.9/km^{2} (4.8/sq mi)
- Time zone: UTC+01:00 (CET)
  - Summer (DST): UTC+02:00 (CEST)
- INSEE/Postal code: 26255 /26310
- ^{1} French Land Register data, which excludes lakes, ponds, glaciers > 1 km^{2} (0.386 sq mi or 247 acres) and river estuaries.

Les Prés (French pronunciation: [le pʁe]; Occitan: Los Prats) is a commune in the Drôme department in southeastern France.

== Population ==
Historical population
Year	Pop.	±% p.a.
1968	25	—
1975	33	+4.05%
1982	41	+3.15%
1990	20	−8.58%
1999	25	+2.51%
2007	23	−1.04%
2012	21	−1.80%
2017	24	+2.71%
2023	31	+4.36%
Source: INSEE

== See also ==
- Communes of the Drôme department
