= Saint-Sauveur-en-Diois =

- Commune
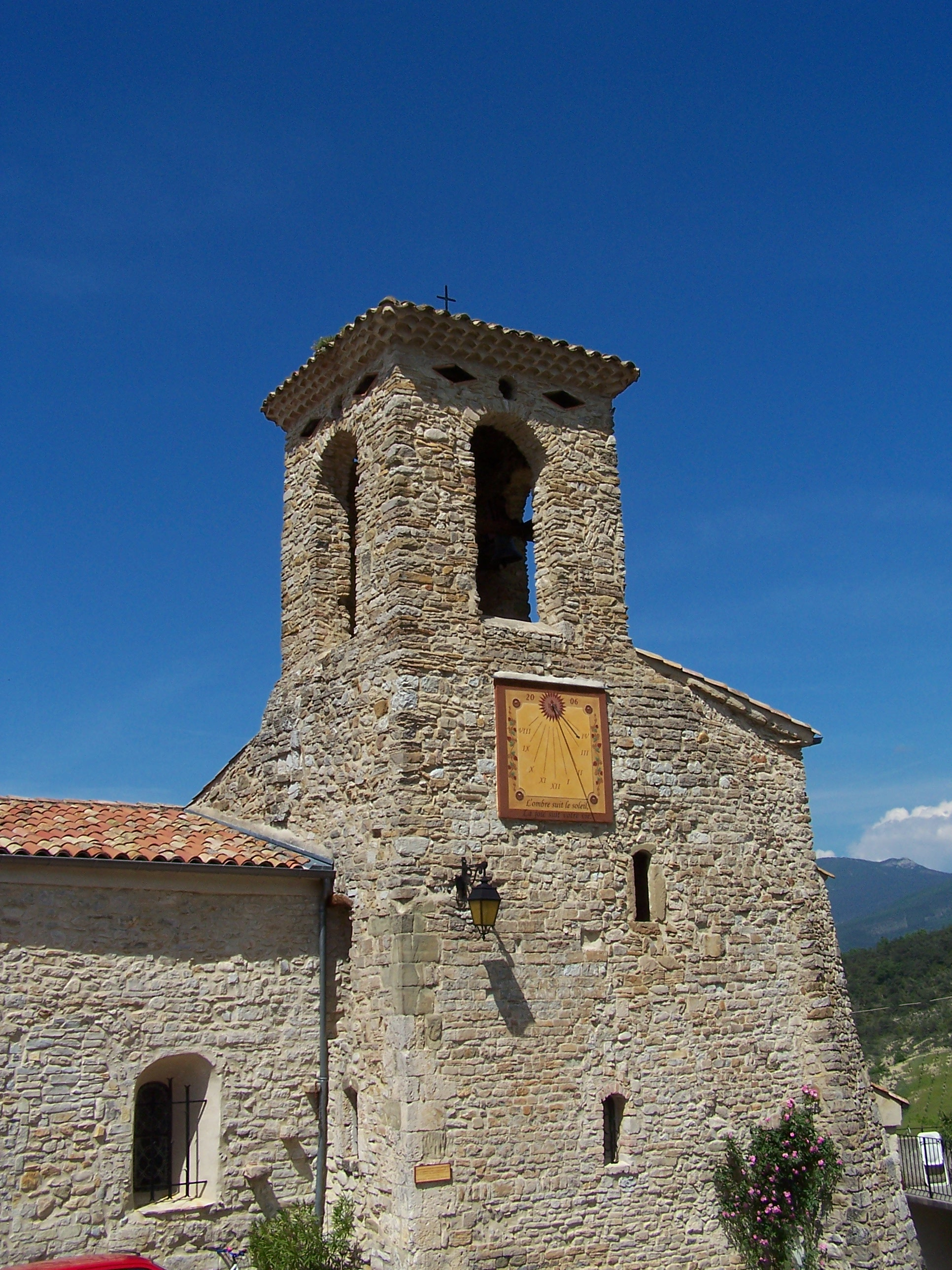
- The bell tower and sundial of the church
- Location of Saint-Sauveur-en-Diois
- Location within France Location within Auvergne-Rhône-Alpes
- Coordinates: 44°40′52″N 5°09′25″E
- Country: France
- Region: Auvergne-Rhône-Alpes
- Department: Drôme
- Arrondissement: Die
- Canton: Le Diois

Government
  - Mayor (2020–2026): Patricia Puc
- Area^{1}: 6.95 km^{2} (2.68 sq mi)
- Elevation: 387 m (1,270 ft)
- Highest elevation: 1,240 m (4,070 ft)
- Lowest elevation: 237 m (778 ft)
- Population (2023): 55
  - Density: 7.9/km^{2} (20/sq mi)
- Time zone: UTC+01:00 (CET)
  - Summer (DST): UTC+02:00 (CEST)
- INSEE/Postal code: 26328 /26340
- ^{1} French Land Register data, which excludes lakes, ponds, glaciers > 1 km^{2} (0.386 sq mi or 247 acres) and river estuaries.

Saint-Sauveur-en-Diois (French pronunciation: [sɛ̃ sovœʁ ɑ̃ diwa]; Vivaro-Alpine: Sant Sauvador de Diés) is a commune in the Drôme department in southeastern France.

== Population ==
Historical population
Year	Pop.	±% p.a.
1968	58	—
1975	40	−5.17%
1982	41	+0.35%
1990	35	−1.96%
1999	52	+4.50%
2007	61	+2.02%
2012	58	−1.00%
2017	55	−1.06%
2023	55	+0.00%
Source: INSEE

== See also ==
- Communes of the Drôme department
