= Canton of Le Diois =

Coordinates: 44.75°N 5.37°E

The canton of Le Diois is an administrative division of the Drôme department, southeastern France. It was created at the French canton reorganisation which came into effect in March 2015. Its seat is in Die.

It consists of the following communes:

1. Arnayon
2. Aubenasson
3. Aucelon
4. Aurel
5. Barnave
6. Barsac
7. La Bâtie-des-Fonds
8. Beaumont-en-Diois
9. Beaurières
10. Bellegarde-en-Diois
11. Boulc
12. Brette
13. Chalancon
14. Chamaloc
15. Charens
16. Chastel-Arnaud
17. Châtillon-en-Diois
18. La Chaudière
19. Die
20. Espenel
21. Establet
22. Eygluy-Escoulin
23. Glandage
24. Gumiane
25. Jonchères
26. Laval-d'Aix
27. Lesches-en-Diois
28. Luc-en-Diois
29. Lus-la-Croix-Haute
30. Marignac-en-Diois
31. Menglon
32. Miscon
33. Montlaur-en-Diois
34. Montmaur-en-Diois
35. La Motte-Chalancon
36. Pennes-le-Sec
37. Ponet-et-Saint-Auban
38. Pontaix
39. Poyols
40. Pradelle
41. Les Prés
42. Recoubeau-Jansac
43. Rimon-et-Savel
44. Rochefourchat
45. Romeyer
46. Rottier
47. Saillans
48. Saint-Andéol
49. Saint-Benoit-en-Diois
50. Saint-Dizier-en-Diois
51. Sainte-Croix
52. Saint-Julien-en-Quint
53. Saint-Nazaire-le-Désert
54. Saint-Roman
55. Saint-Sauveur-en-Diois
56. Solaure-en-Diois
57. Vachères-en-Quint
58. Val-Maravel
59. Valdrôme
60. Vercheny
61. Volvent
