= Vercheny =

- Commune
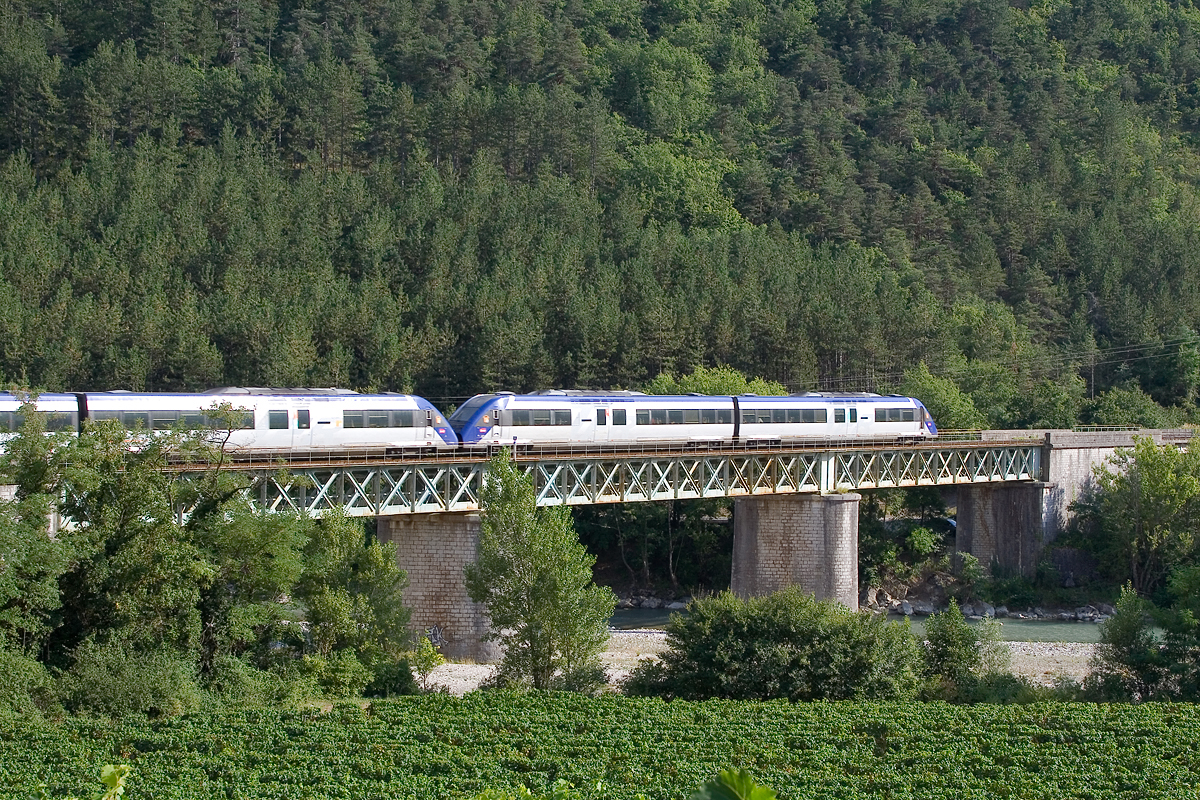
- The Vercheny viaduct
- Location of Vercheny
- Location within France Location within Auvergne-Rhône-Alpes
- Coordinates: 44°42′40″N 5°15′00″E
- Country: France
- Region: Auvergne-Rhône-Alpes
- Department: Drôme
- Arrondissement: Die
- Canton: Le Diois

Government
  - Mayor (2020–2026): Franck Monge
- Area^{1}: 11.19 km^{2} (4.32 sq mi)
- Elevation: 306 m (1,004 ft)
- Highest elevation: 1,109 m (3,638 ft)
- Lowest elevation: 280 m (920 ft)
- Population (2023): 443
  - Density: 39.6/km^{2} (103/sq mi)
- Time zone: UTC+01:00 (CET)
  - Summer (DST): UTC+02:00 (CEST)
- INSEE/Postal code: 26368 /26340
- ^{1} French Land Register data, which excludes lakes, ponds, glaciers > 1 km^{2} (0.386 sq mi or 247 acres) and river estuaries.

Vercheny (French pronunciation: [vɛʁʃəni]; Occitan: Ventairòu) is a commune in the Drôme department in southeastern France.

== Population ==
Historical population
Year	Pop.	±% p.a.
1968	268	—
1975	415	+6.45%
1982	421	+0.21%
1990	427	+0.18%
1999	387	−1.09%
2007	426	+1.21%
2012	432	+0.28%
2017	461	+1.31%
2023	443	−0.66%
Source: INSEE

== See also ==
- Communes of the Drôme department
