= Volvent =

- Commune
- Location of Volvent
- Location within France Location within Auvergne-Rhône-Alpes
- Coordinates: 44°33′36″N 5°20′42″E
- Country: France
- Region: Auvergne-Rhône-Alpes
- Department: Drôme
- Arrondissement: Die
- Canton: Le Diois
- Intercommunality: Diois

Government
  - Mayor (2020–2026): Charles Brès
- Area^{1}: 16.73 km^{2} (6.46 sq mi)
- Elevation: 850 m (2,790 ft)
- Highest elevation: 1,600 m (5,200 ft)
- Lowest elevation: 720 m (2,360 ft)
- Population (2023): 37
  - Density: 2.2/km^{2} (5.7/sq mi)
- Time zone: UTC+01:00 (CET)
  - Summer (DST): UTC+02:00 (CEST)
- INSEE/Postal code: 26378 /26470
- ^{1} French Land Register data, which excludes lakes, ponds, glaciers > 1 km^{2} (0.386 sq mi or 247 acres) and river estuaries.

Volvent (French pronunciation: [vɔlvɑ̃]) is a commune in the Drôme department in southeastern France.

== Population ==
Historical population
Year	Pop.	±% p.a.
1968	39	—
1975	30	−3.68%
1982	24	−3.14%
1990	23	−0.53%
1999	26	+1.37%
2007	43	+6.49%
2012	35	−4.03%
2017	33	−1.17%
2023	37	+1.93%
Source: INSEE

== See also ==
- Communes of the Drôme department
