= Miscon =

- Commune
- Location of Miscon
- Location within France Location within Auvergne-Rhône-Alpes
- Coordinates: 44°37′46″N 5°31′30″E
- Country: France
- Region: Auvergne-Rhône-Alpes
- Department: Drôme
- Arrondissement: Die
- Canton: Le Diois
- Intercommunality: Diois

Government
  - Mayor (2020–2026): Aline Guilhot
- Area^{1}: 12.66 km^{2} (4.89 sq mi)
- Highest elevation: 1,440 m (4,720 ft)
- Lowest elevation: 688 m (2,257 ft)
- Population (2023): 73
  - Density: 5.8/km^{2} (15/sq mi)
- Time zone: UTC+01:00 (CET)
  - Summer (DST): UTC+02:00 (CEST)
- INSEE/Postal code: 26186 /26310
- ^{1} French Land Register data, which excludes lakes, ponds, glaciers > 1 km^{2} (0.386 sq mi or 247 acres) and river estuaries.

Miscon (French pronunciation: [miskɔ̃]; Occitan: Malaura) is a commune in the Drôme department in southeastern France.

== Population ==
Historical population
| Year | Pop. | ±% p.a. |
|---|---|---|
| 1968 | 36 | — |
| 1975 | 30 | −2.57% |
| 1982 | 28 | −0.98% |
| 1990 | 38 | +3.89% |
| 1999 | 47 | +2.39% |
| 2007 | 48 | +0.26% |
| 2012 | 63 | +5.59% |
| 2017 | 55 | −2.68% |
| 2023 | 73 | +4.83% |
Source: INSEE

== See also ==
- Communes of the Drôme department
