= Val-Maravel =

- Commune
- Location of Val-Maravel
- Location within France Location within Auvergne-Rhône-Alpes
- Coordinates: 44°35′31″N 5°34′12″E
- Country: France
- Region: Auvergne-Rhône-Alpes
- Department: Drôme
- Arrondissement: Die
- Canton: Le Diois
- Intercommunality: Diois

Government
  - Mayor (2020–2026): Charles Meyssonnier
- Area^{1}: 21.6 km^{2} (8.3 sq mi)
- Elevation: 840 m (2,760 ft)
- Highest elevation: 1,690 m (5,540 ft)
- Lowest elevation: 776 m (2,546 ft)
- Population (2023): 55
  - Density: 2.5/km^{2} (6.6/sq mi)
- Time zone: UTC+01:00 (CET)
  - Summer (DST): UTC+02:00 (CEST)
- INSEE/Postal code: 26136 /26310
- ^{1} French Land Register data, which excludes lakes, ponds, glaciers > 1 km^{2} (0.386 sq mi or 247 acres) and river estuaries.

Val-Maravel (French pronunciation: [val maʁavɛl]; Occitan: Vau Maravèu) is a commune in the Drôme department in southeastern France.

== Population ==
Historical population
Year	Pop.	±% p.a.
1968	59	—
1975	48	−2.90%
1982	43	−1.56%
1990	41	−0.59%
1999	43	+0.53%
2007	43	+0.00%
2012	46	+1.36%
2017	55	+3.64%
2023	55	+0.00%
Source: INSEE

== See also ==
- Communes of the Drôme department
