= La Bâtie-des-Fonds =

- Commune
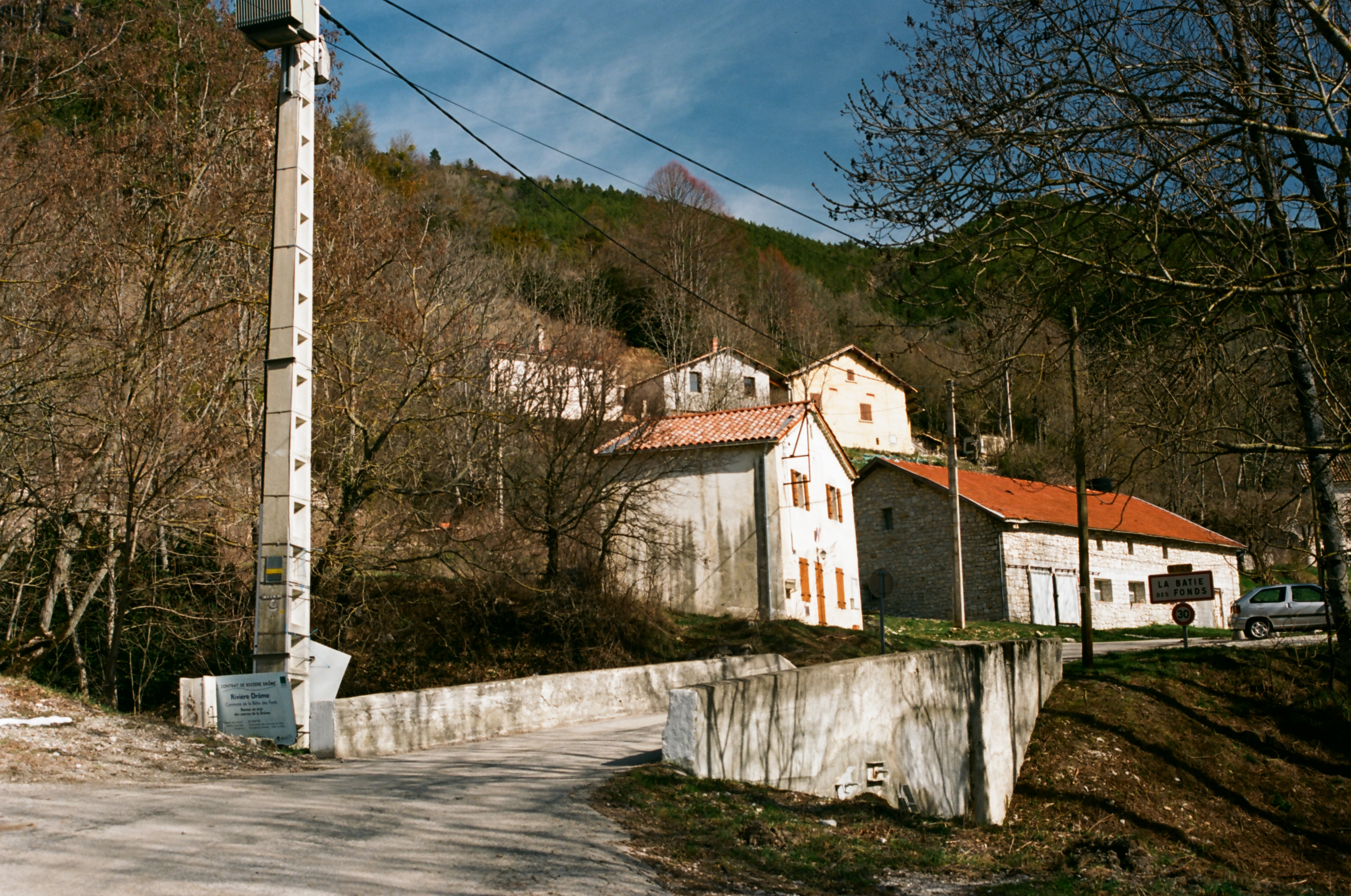
- The village of La Bâtie-des-Fonds
- Location of La Bâtie-des-Fonds
- Location within France Location within Auvergne-Rhône-Alpes
- Coordinates: 44°30′55″N 5°38′22″E
- Country: France
- Region: Auvergne-Rhône-Alpes
- Department: Drôme
- Arrondissement: Die
- Canton: Le Diois
- Intercommunality: Diois

Government
  - Mayor (2023–2026): François Deloupy-Dobin
- Area^{1}: 12.12 km^{2} (4.68 sq mi)
- Highest elevation: 1,640 m (5,380 ft)
- Lowest elevation: 872 m (2,861 ft)
- Population (2023): 6
  - Density: 0.50/km^{2} (1.3/sq mi)
- Time zone: UTC+01:00 (CET)
  - Summer (DST): UTC+02:00 (CEST)
- INSEE/Postal code: 26030 /26310
- ^{1} French Land Register data, which excludes lakes, ponds, glaciers > 1 km^{2} (0.386 sq mi or 247 acres) and river estuaries.

La Bâtie-des-Fonds (French pronunciation: [la bati de fɔ̃]; Occitan: La Bastiá des Fònts) is a commune in the Drôme department in southeastern France.

== Population ==
Historical population
| Year | Pop. | ±% p.a. |
|---|---|---|
| 1968 | 11 | — |
| 1975 | 9 | −2.83% |
| 1982 | 17 | +9.51% |
| 1990 | 8 | −8.99% |
| 1999 | 10 | +2.51% |
| 2007 | 8 | −2.75% |
| 2012 | 6 | −5.59% |
| 2017 | 4 | −7.79% |
| 2023 | 6 | +6.99% |
Source: INSEE

== See also ==
- Communes of the Drôme department
