= Espenel =

- Commune
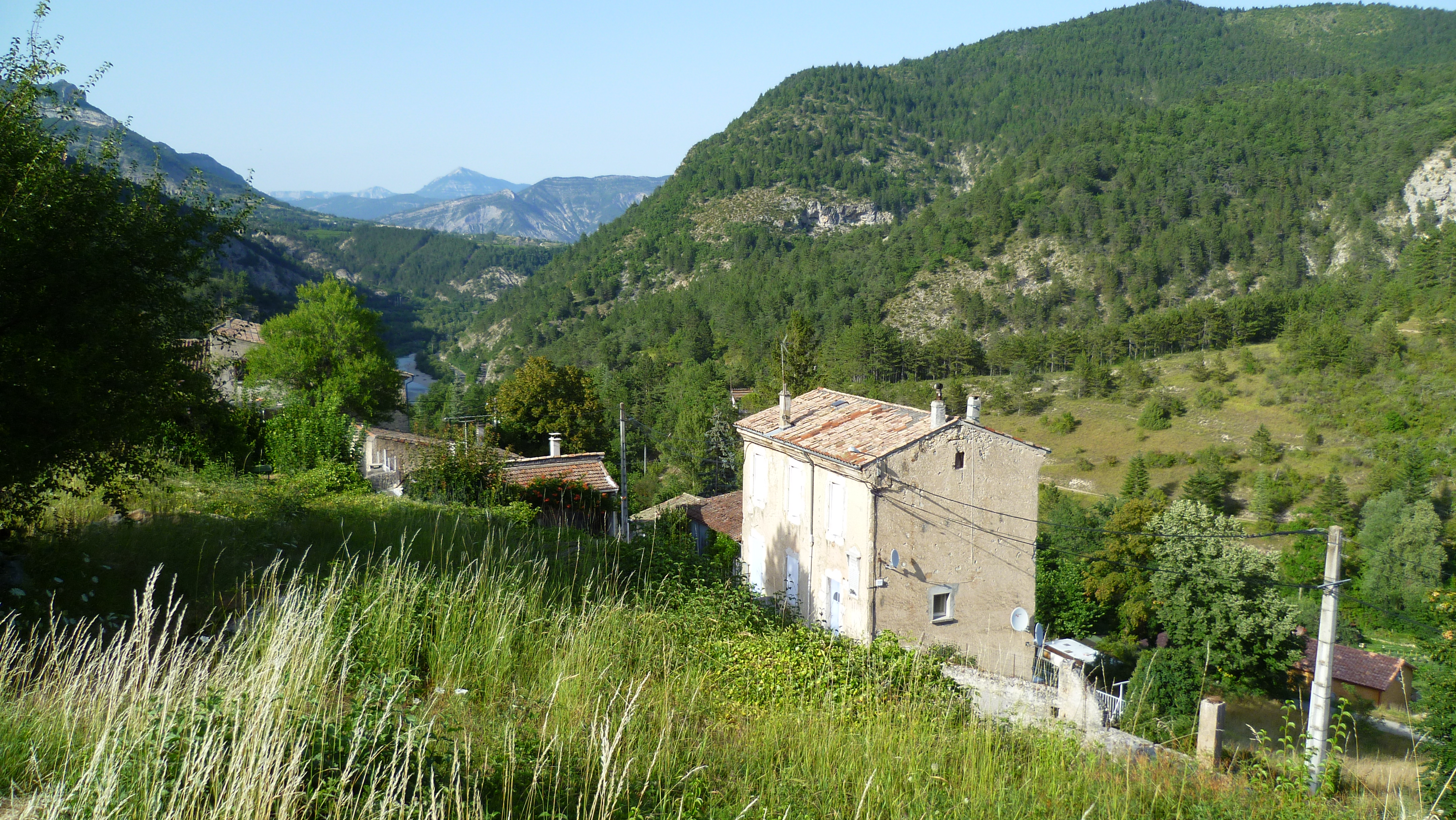
- View of Espenel with the Drôme river in the background

- Coat of arms
- Location of Espenel
- Location within France Location within Auvergne-Rhône-Alpes
- Coordinates: 44°41′05″N 5°14′06″E
- Country: France
- Region: Auvergne-Rhône-Alpes
- Department: Drôme
- Arrondissement: Die
- Canton: Le Diois
- Intercommunality: CC du Crestois et du pays de Saillans

Government
  - Mayor (2022–2026): Damien Marché
- Area^{1}: 15.06 km^{2} (5.81 sq mi)
- Highest elevation: 1,190 m (3,900 ft)
- Lowest elevation: 265 m (869 ft)
- Population (2023): 193
  - Density: 12.8/km^{2} (33.2/sq mi)
- Demonym: Espenélois
- Time zone: UTC+01:00 (CET)
  - Summer (DST): UTC+02:00 (CEST)
- INSEE/Postal code: 26122 /26340
- ^{1} French Land Register data, which excludes lakes, ponds, glaciers > 1 km^{2} (0.386 sq mi or 247 acres) and river estuaries.

Espenel (French pronunciation: [ɛspənɛl]) is a rural commune in the Drôme department in the Auvergne-Rhône-Alpes region in southeastern France.

== Population ==
Historical population
Year	Pop.	±% p.a.
1968	108	—
1975	92	−2.26%
1982	96	+0.61%
1990	112	+1.95%
1999	119	+0.68%
2007	119	+0.00%
2012	137	+2.86%
2017	172	+4.66%
2023	193	+1.94%
Source: INSEE

== See also ==
- Communes of the Drôme department
