= Chastel-Arnaud =

- Commune
- Location of Chastel-Arnaud
- Location within France Location within Auvergne-Rhône-Alpes
- Coordinates: 44°39′49″N 5°12′47″E
- Country: France
- Region: Auvergne-Rhône-Alpes
- Department: Drôme
- Arrondissement: Die
- Canton: Le Diois

Government
  - Mayor (2020–2026): Frédéric Teyssot
- Area^{1}: 12.65 km^{2} (4.88 sq mi)
- Highest elevation: 1,539 m (5,049 ft)
- Lowest elevation: 352 m (1,155 ft)
- Population (2023): 48
  - Density: 3.8/km^{2} (9.8/sq mi)
- Time zone: UTC+01:00 (CET)
  - Summer (DST): UTC+02:00 (CEST)
- INSEE/Postal code: 26080 /26340
- ^{1} French Land Register data, which excludes lakes, ponds, glaciers > 1 km^{2} (0.386 sq mi or 247 acres) and river estuaries.

Chastel-Arnaud (French pronunciation: [ʃastɛl aʁno]) is a commune in the Drôme department in southeastern France.

== Population ==
Historical population
Year	Pop.	±% p.a.
1968	7	—
1975	10	+5.23%
1982	13	+3.82%
1990	16	+2.63%
1999	36	+9.43%
2007	49	+3.93%
2012	43	−2.58%
2017	40	−1.44%
2023	48	+3.09%
Source: INSEE

== See also ==
- Communes of the Drôme department
