= Aucelon =

- Commune
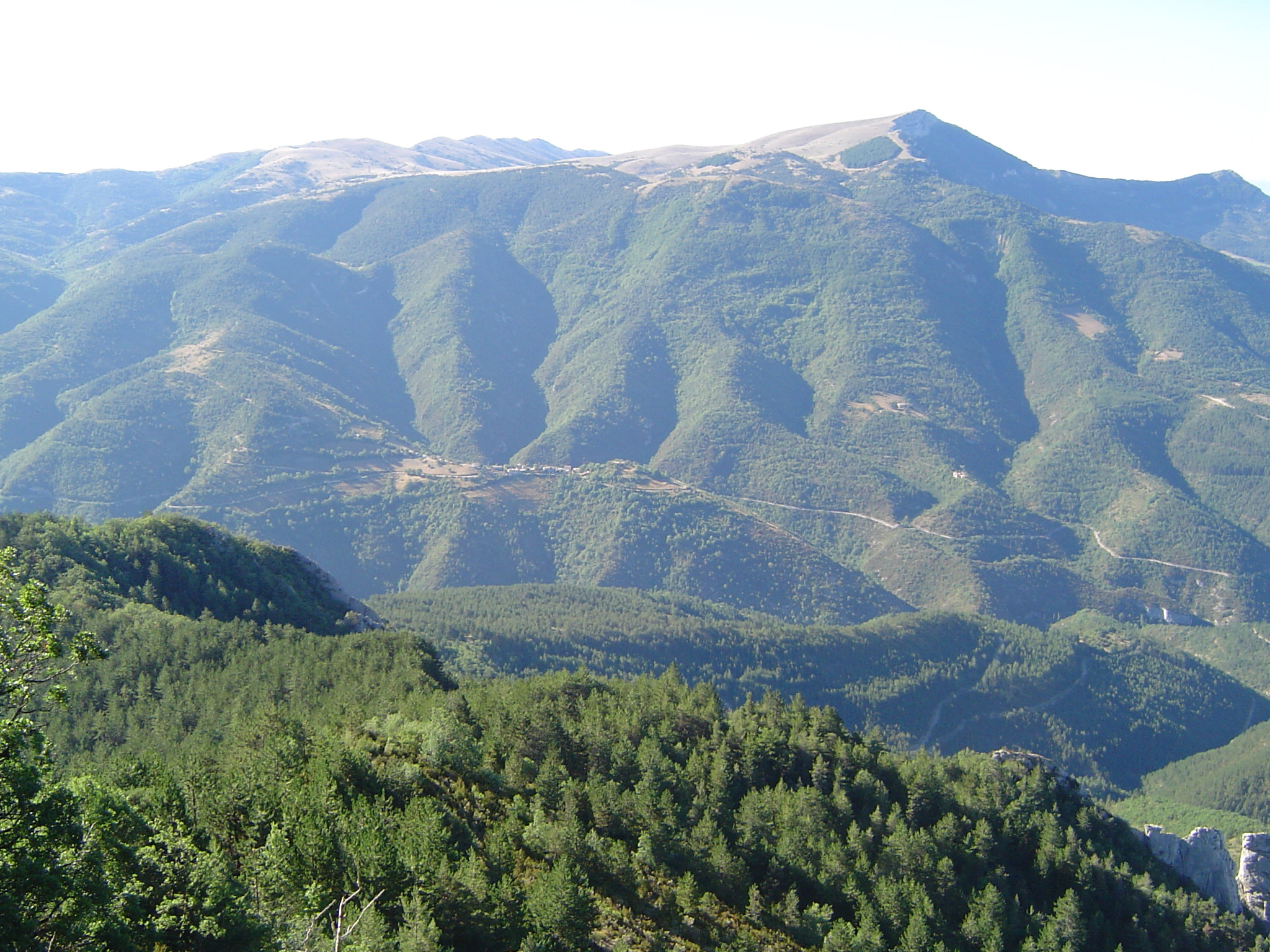
- The village of Aucelon and its surroundings
- Location of Aucelon
- Location within France Location within Auvergne-Rhône-Alpes
- Coordinates: 44°37′30″N 5°20′43″E
- Country: France
- Region: Auvergne-Rhône-Alpes
- Department: Drôme
- Arrondissement: Die
- Canton: Le Diois
- Intercommunality: CC Diois

Government
  - Mayor (2020–2026): Joël Boeyaert
- Area^{1}: 26.34 km^{2} (10.17 sq mi)
- Highest elevation: 1,485 m (4,872 ft)
- Lowest elevation: 435 m (1,427 ft)
- Population (2023): 17
  - Density: 0.65/km^{2} (1.7/sq mi)
- Time zone: UTC+01:00 (CET)
  - Summer (DST): UTC+02:00 (CEST)
- INSEE/Postal code: 26017 /26340
- ^{1} French Land Register data, which excludes lakes, ponds, glaciers > 1 km^{2} (0.386 sq mi or 247 acres) and river estuaries.

Aucelon (French pronunciation: [oslɔ̃]) is a commune in the department of Drôme, southeastern France. It is found in the Auvergne-Rhône-Alpes region.

== Geography ==
Aucelon is a village perched at an altitude of 755 meters, towards the center of the mountain rings of Diosis. Aucelon's mountain has a height of 1356 meters. It is located in the south west of Die Tand, extends to the north of the Fourniers, and overlooks the valley of Roanne. The town is watered by the Brette.

== Demography ==
In 1821, the municipality of Aucelon had 458 inhabitants, which declined to only 13 in 2012.

Historical population

Year	Pop.	±% p.a.
1793	417	—
1821	458	+0.34%
1911	160	−1.16%
1946	78	−2.03%
1962	43	−3.65%
1968	33	−4.32%
1975	28	−2.32%

Year	Pop.	±% p.a.
1982	21	−4.03%
1990	18	−1.91%
1999	39	+8.97%
2007	29	−3.64%
2012	13	−14.83%
2017	16	+4.24%
2023	17	+1.02%

Source: EHESS and INSEE

== See also ==
- Communes of the Drôme department
