= Montlaur-en-Diois =

- Commune
- Location of Montlaur-en-Diois
- Location within France Location within Auvergne-Rhône-Alpes
- Coordinates: 44°37′57″N 5°25′45″E
- Country: France
- Region: Auvergne-Rhône-Alpes
- Department: Drôme
- Arrondissement: Die
- Canton: Le Diois
- Intercommunality: Diois

Government
  - Mayor (2020–2026): Michel Leclercq
- Area^{1}: 9.72 km^{2} (3.75 sq mi)
- Highest elevation: 1,320 m (4,330 ft)
- Lowest elevation: 502 m (1,647 ft)
- Population (2023): 134
  - Density: 13.8/km^{2} (35.7/sq mi)
- Time zone: UTC+01:00 (CET)
  - Summer (DST): UTC+02:00 (CEST)
- INSEE/Postal code: 26204 /26310
- ^{1} French Land Register data, which excludes lakes, ponds, glaciers > 1 km^{2} (0.386 sq mi or 247 acres) and river estuaries.

Montlaur-en-Diois (French pronunciation: [mɔ̃lɔʁ ɑ̃ diwa]; Occitan: Montlaur) is a commune in the Drôme department in southeastern France.

== Population ==
Historical population
Year	Pop.	±% p.a.
1968	129	—
1975	109	−2.38%
1982	88	−3.01%
1990	80	−1.18%
1999	116	+4.21%
2007	145	+2.83%
2012	152	+0.95%
2017	146	−0.80%
2023	134	−1.42%
Source: INSEE

== See also ==
- Communes of the Drôme department
