= Barnave =

Barnave may refer to:

- Antoine Barnave (1761–1793), French politician
- Barnave, Drôme, a commune of the Drôme département in France
