= Montclar-sur-Gervanne =

- Commune
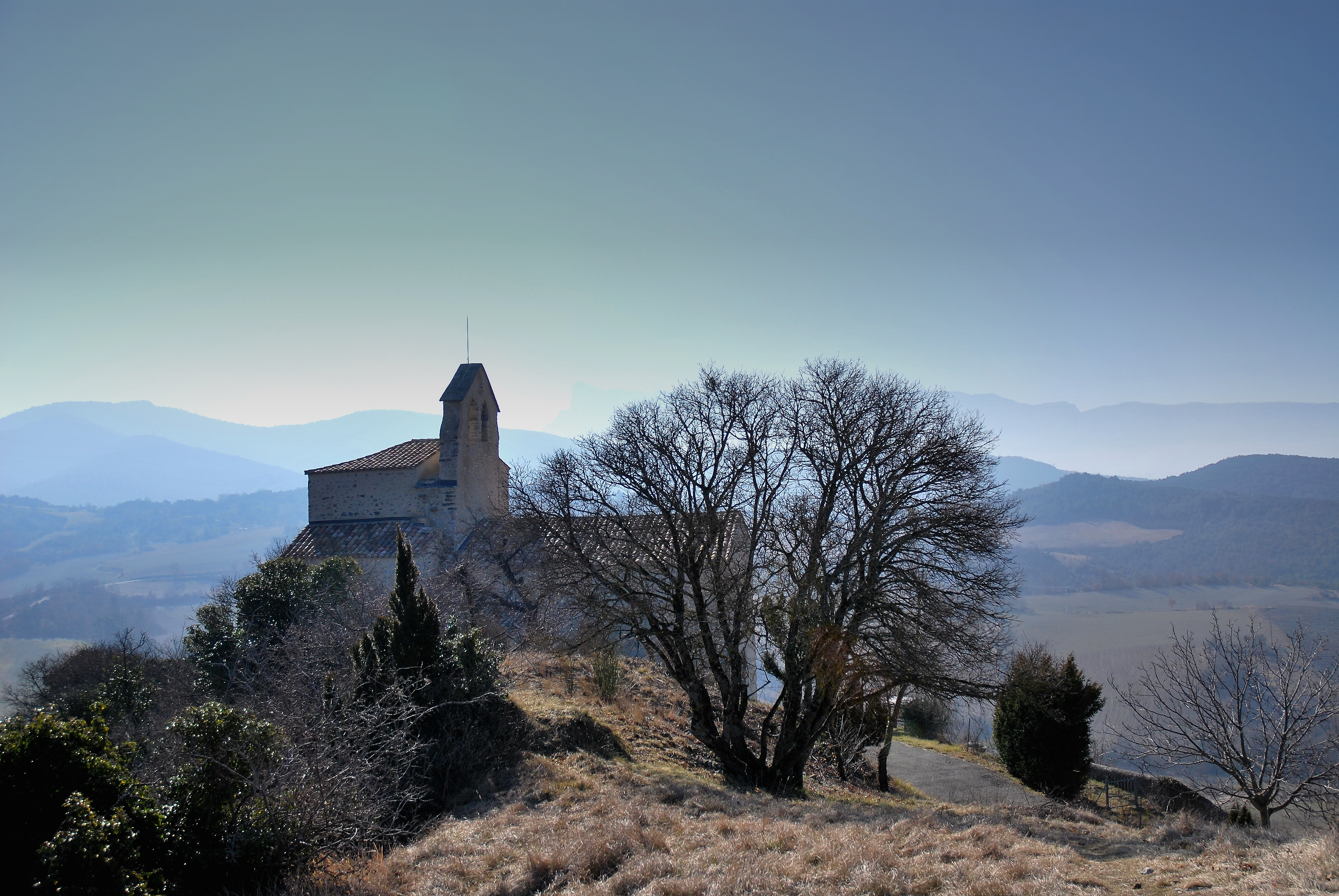
- The church of Montclar
- Location of Montclar-sur-Gervanne
- Location within France Location within Auvergne-Rhône-Alpes
- Coordinates: 44°44′54″N 5°08′39″E
- Country: France
- Region: Auvergne-Rhône-Alpes
- Department: Drôme
- Arrondissement: Die
- Canton: Crest
- Intercommunality: Val de Drôme en Biovallée

Government
  - Mayor (2021–2026): Laurent Sayn
- Area^{1}: 29.63 km^{2} (11.44 sq mi)
- Highest elevation: 836 m (2,743 ft)
- Lowest elevation: 239 m (784 ft)
- Population (2023): 194
  - Density: 6.55/km^{2} (17.0/sq mi)
- Time zone: UTC+01:00 (CET)
  - Summer (DST): UTC+02:00 (CEST)
- INSEE/Postal code: 26195 /26400
- ^{1} French Land Register data, which excludes lakes, ponds, glaciers > 1 km^{2} (0.386 sq mi or 247 acres) and river estuaries.

Montclar-sur-Gervanne (French pronunciation: [mɔ̃klaʁ syʁ ʒɛʁvan]; Occitan: Montclar de Gervana) is a commune in the Drôme department in southeastern France.

== Population ==
Historical population
Year	Pop.	±% p.a.
1968	228	—
1975	182	−3.17%
1982	170	−0.97%
1990	154	−1.23%
1999	157	+0.21%
2007	188	+2.28%
2012	180	−0.87%
2017	186	+0.66%
2023	194	+0.70%
Source: INSEE

== See also ==
- Communes of the Drôme department
