= Vaunaveys-la-Rochette =

- Commune
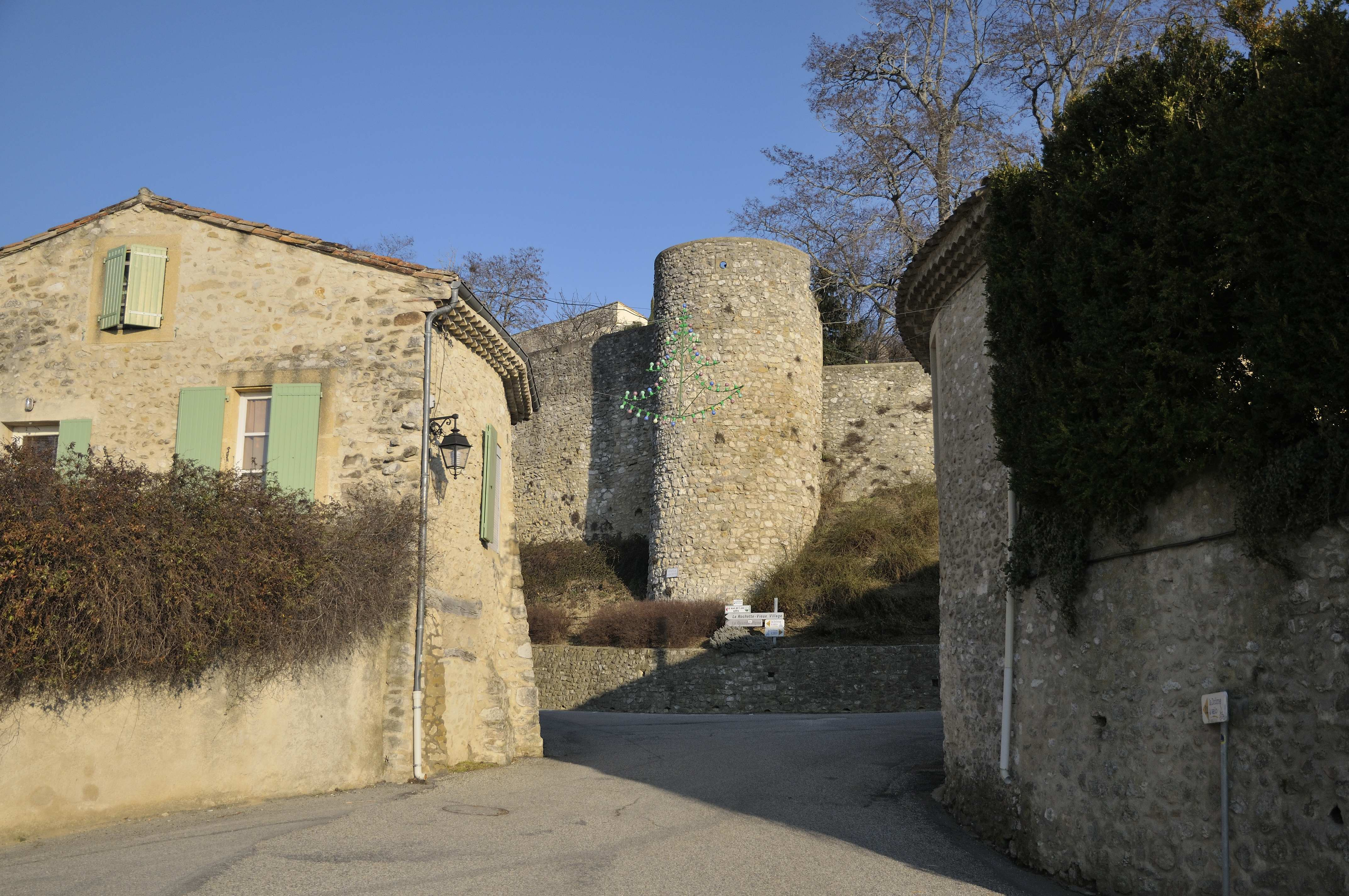
- The road into the village
- Location of Vaunaveys-la-Rochette
- Location within France Location within Auvergne-Rhône-Alpes
- Coordinates: 44°46′N 5°02′E
- Country: France
- Region: Auvergne-Rhône-Alpes
- Department: Drôme
- Arrondissement: Die
- Canton: Crest
- Intercommunality: Val de Drôme en Biovallée

Government
  - Mayor (2020–2026): Claude d'Hérouville
- Area^{1}: 21.93 km^{2} (8.47 sq mi)
- Elevation: 300 m (980 ft)
- Highest elevation: 808 m (2,651 ft)
- Lowest elevation: 193 m (633 ft)
- Population (2023): 625
  - Density: 28.5/km^{2} (73.8/sq mi)
- Time zone: UTC+01:00 (CET)
  - Summer (DST): UTC+02:00 (CEST)
- INSEE/Postal code: 26365 /26400
- ^{1} French Land Register data, which excludes lakes, ponds, glaciers > 1 km^{2} (0.386 sq mi or 247 acres) and river estuaries.

Vaunaveys-la-Rochette (French pronunciation: [vonavɛ la ʁɔʃɛt]) is a commune in the Drôme department in southeastern France.

== Population ==
Historical population
Year	Pop.	±% p.a.
1968	392	—
1975	350	−1.61%
1982	401	+1.96%
1990	448	+1.40%
1999	548	+2.26%
2007	580	+0.71%
2012	593	+0.44%
2017	584	−0.31%
2023	625	+1.14%
Source: INSEE

== See also ==
- Communes of the Drôme department
