= Montmeyran =

- Commune
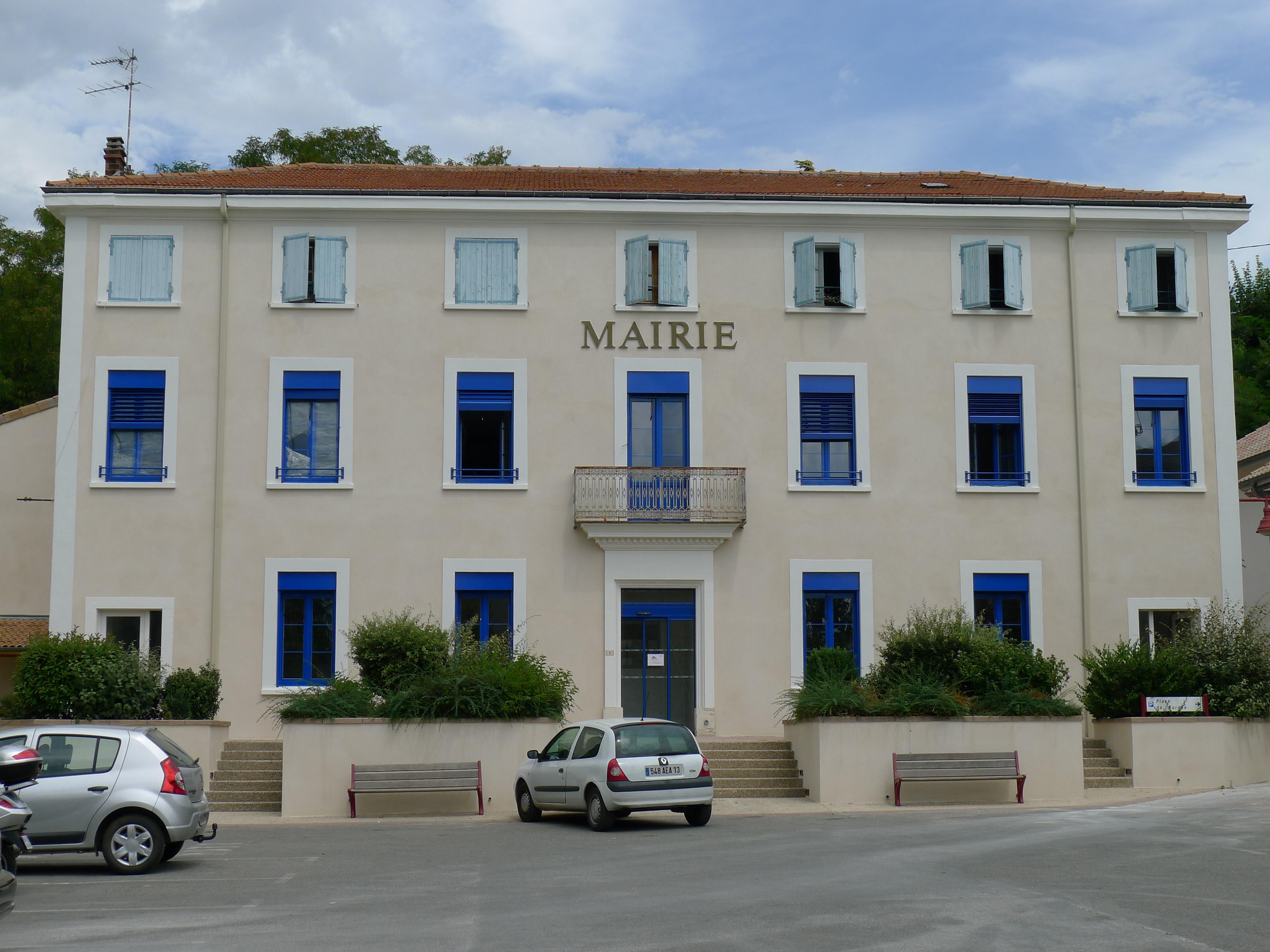
- The town hall of Montmeyran

- Coat of arms
- Location of Montmeyran
- Location within France Location within Auvergne-Rhône-Alpes
- Coordinates: 44°50′02″N 4°58′32″E
- Country: France
- Region: Auvergne-Rhône-Alpes
- Department: Drôme
- Arrondissement: Valence
- Canton: Crest
- Intercommunality: CA Valence Romans Agglo

Government
  - Mayor (2020–2026): Olivier Rochas
- Area^{1}: 24.1 km^{2} (9.3 sq mi)
- Elevation: 191 m (627 ft)
- Highest elevation: 309 m (1,014 ft)
- Lowest elevation: 148 m (486 ft)
- Population (2023): 2,960
  - Density: 123/km^{2} (318/sq mi)
- Time zone: UTC+01:00 (CET)
  - Summer (DST): UTC+02:00 (CEST)
- INSEE/Postal code: 26206 /26120
- ^{1} French Land Register data, which excludes lakes, ponds, glaciers > 1 km^{2} (0.386 sq mi or 247 acres) and river estuaries.

Montmeyran (French pronunciation: [mɔ̃meʁɑ̃]; Occitan: Montmairan) is a commune in the Drôme department in southeastern France.

== Population ==
Historical population
Year	Pop.	±% p.a.
1968	1,433	—
1975	1,550	+1.13%
1982	2,008	+3.77%
1990	2,360	+2.04%
1999	2,680	+1.42%
2007	2,787	+0.49%
2012	2,888	+0.71%
2017	2,916	+0.19%
2023	2,960	+0.25%
Source: INSEE

== Heraldry ==
Coat of arms of Montmeyran	Divided: in the 1st part, in the I azure a silver tower open, pierced and masoned sable, in the II gules an oak leaf or placed bendwise, in the 2nd vert a sheep halted and turned to the sinister argent.

== See also ==
- Communes of the Drôme department
