= Mirabel-et-Blacons =

- Commune
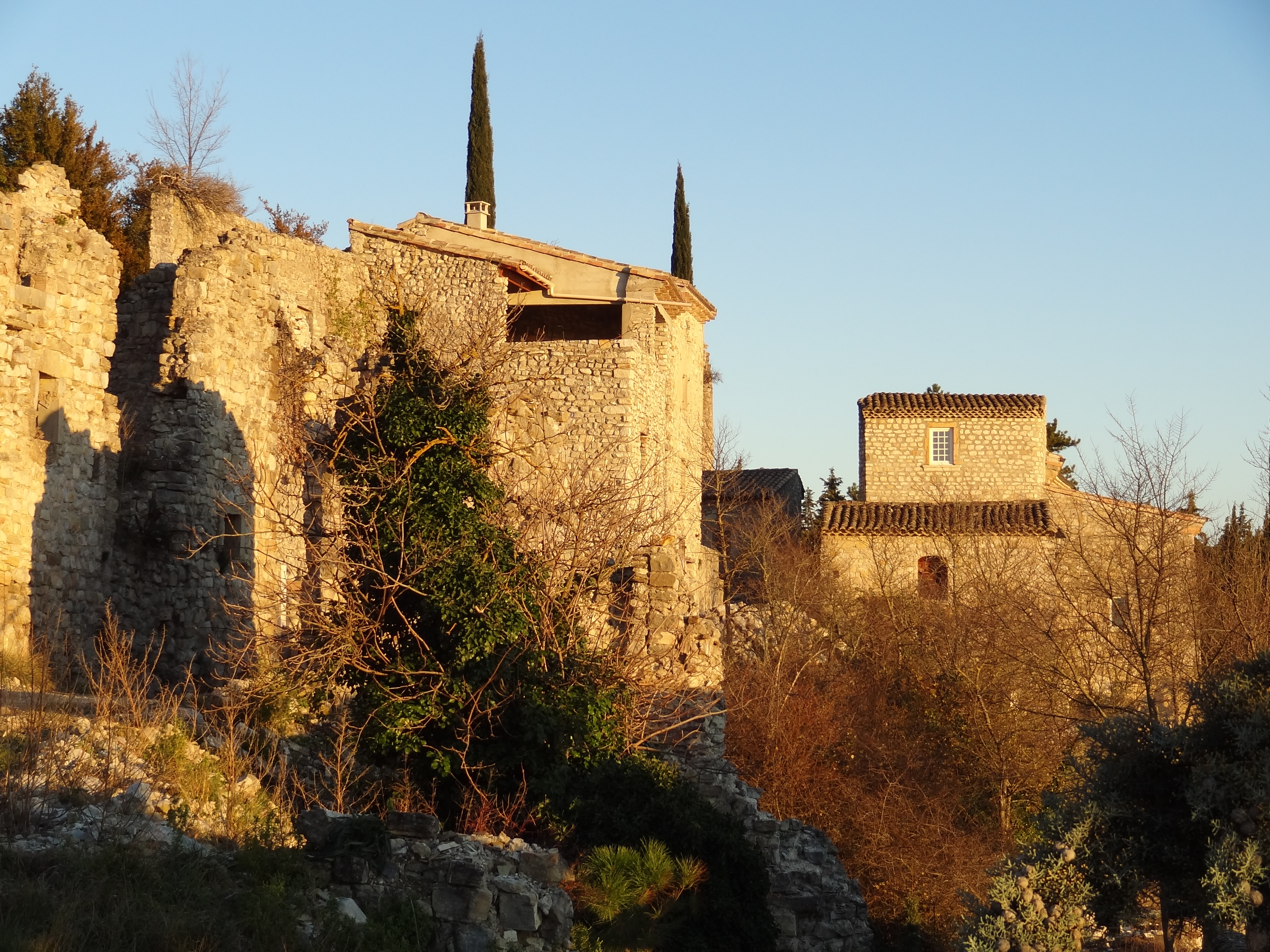
- A view from the Maison de Mirabel
- Location of Mirabel-et-Blacons
- Location within France Location within Auvergne-Rhône-Alpes
- Coordinates: 44°42′41″N 5°05′33″E
- Country: France
- Region: Auvergne-Rhône-Alpes
- Department: Drôme
- Arrondissement: Die
- Canton: Crest
- Intercommunality: Crestois et Pays de Saillans Cœur de Drôme

Government
  - Mayor (2020–2026): Jean-Philippe Roche
- Area^{1}: 17.48 km^{2} (6.75 sq mi)
- Elevation: 220 m (720 ft)
- Highest elevation: 705 m (2,313 ft)
- Lowest elevation: 197 m (646 ft)
- Population (2023): 1,198
  - Density: 68.54/km^{2} (177.5/sq mi)
- Time zone: UTC+01:00 (CET)
  - Summer (DST): UTC+02:00 (CEST)
- INSEE/Postal code: 26183 /26400
- ^{1} French Land Register data, which excludes lakes, ponds, glaciers > 1 km^{2} (0.386 sq mi or 247 acres) and river estuaries.

Mirabel-et-Blacons is a commune in the Drôme department in southeastern France.

== Population ==
Historical population
Year	Pop.	±% p.a.
1968	552	—
1975	592	+1.00%
1982	592	+0.00%
1990	728	+2.62%
1999	815	+1.26%
2007	888	+1.08%
2012	925	+0.82%
2017	1,095	+3.43%
2023	1,198	+1.51%
Source: INSEE

== See also ==
- Communes of the Drôme department
