= Aouste-sur-Sye =

- Commune
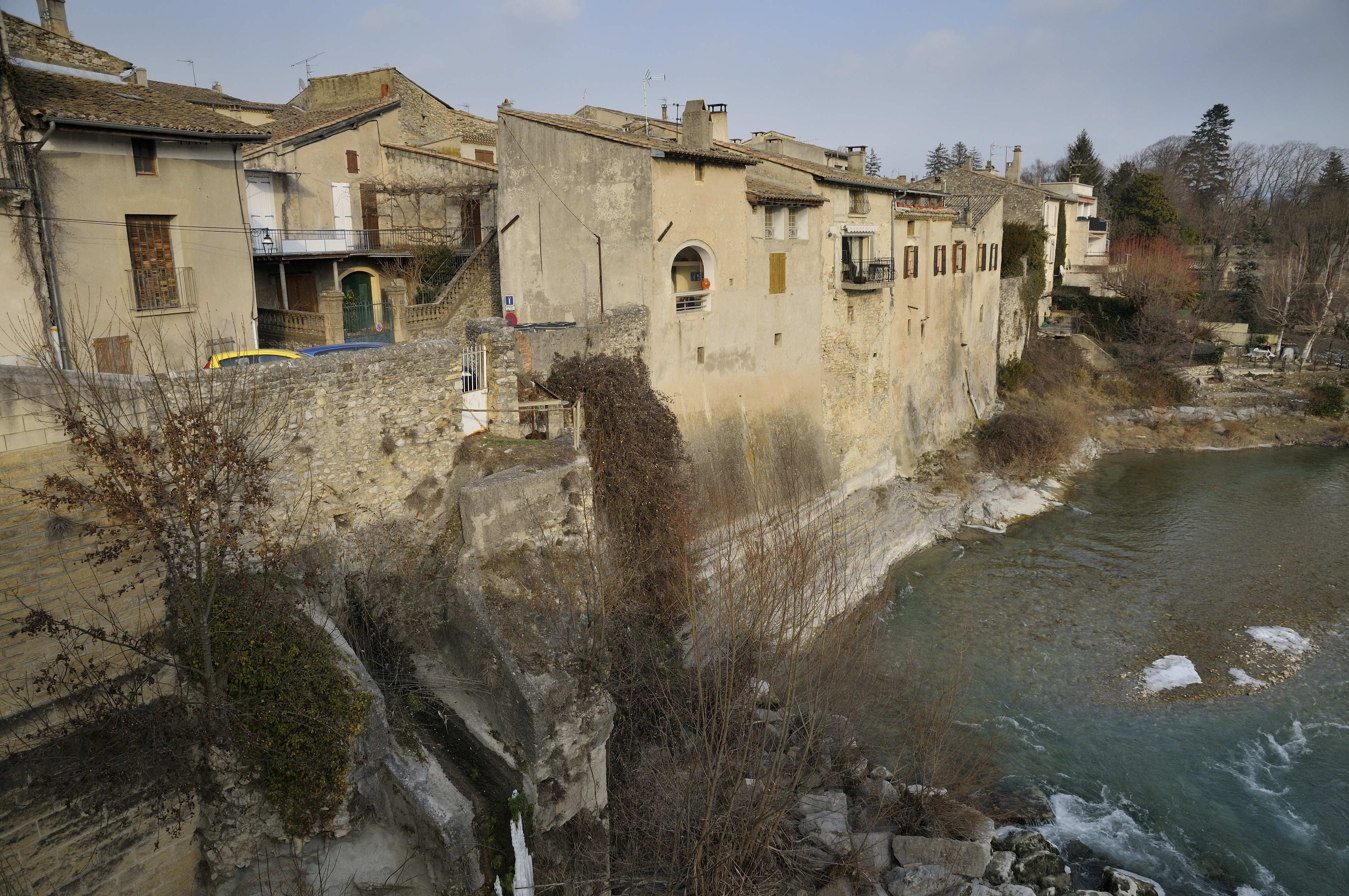
- A view from Aouste bridge, over the Sye river

- Coat of arms
- Location of Aouste-sur-Sye
- Location within France Location within Auvergne-Rhône-Alpes
- Coordinates: 44°43′00″N 5°03′27″E
- Country: France
- Region: Auvergne-Rhône-Alpes
- Department: Drôme
- Arrondissement: Die
- Canton: Crest
- Intercommunality: Crestois et Pays de Saillans Cœur de Drôme

Government
  - Mayor (2020–2026): Denis Benoît
- Area^{1}: 17.98 km^{2} (6.94 sq mi)
- Highest elevation: 841 m (2,759 ft)
- Lowest elevation: 186 m (610 ft)
- Population (2023): 2,733
  - Density: 152.0/km^{2} (393.7/sq mi)
- Time zone: UTC+01:00 (CET)
  - Summer (DST): UTC+02:00 (CEST)
- INSEE/Postal code: 26011 /26400
- ^{1} French Land Register data, which excludes lakes, ponds, glaciers > 1 km^{2} (0.386 sq mi or 247 acres) and river estuaries.

Aouste-sur-Sye (French pronunciation: [ust syʁ si]; Occitan: Aosta) is a commune in the Drôme department in southeastern France.

== Population ==
Historical population
Year	Pop.	±% p.a.
1968	1,317	—
1975	1,565	+2.50%
1982	1,753	+1.63%
1990	1,820	+0.47%
1999	1,989	+0.99%
2007	2,248	+1.54%
2012	2,418	+1.47%
2017	2,524	+0.86%
2023	2,733	+1.33%
Source: INSEE

== See also ==
- Communes of the Drôme department
