= Autichamp =

- Commune
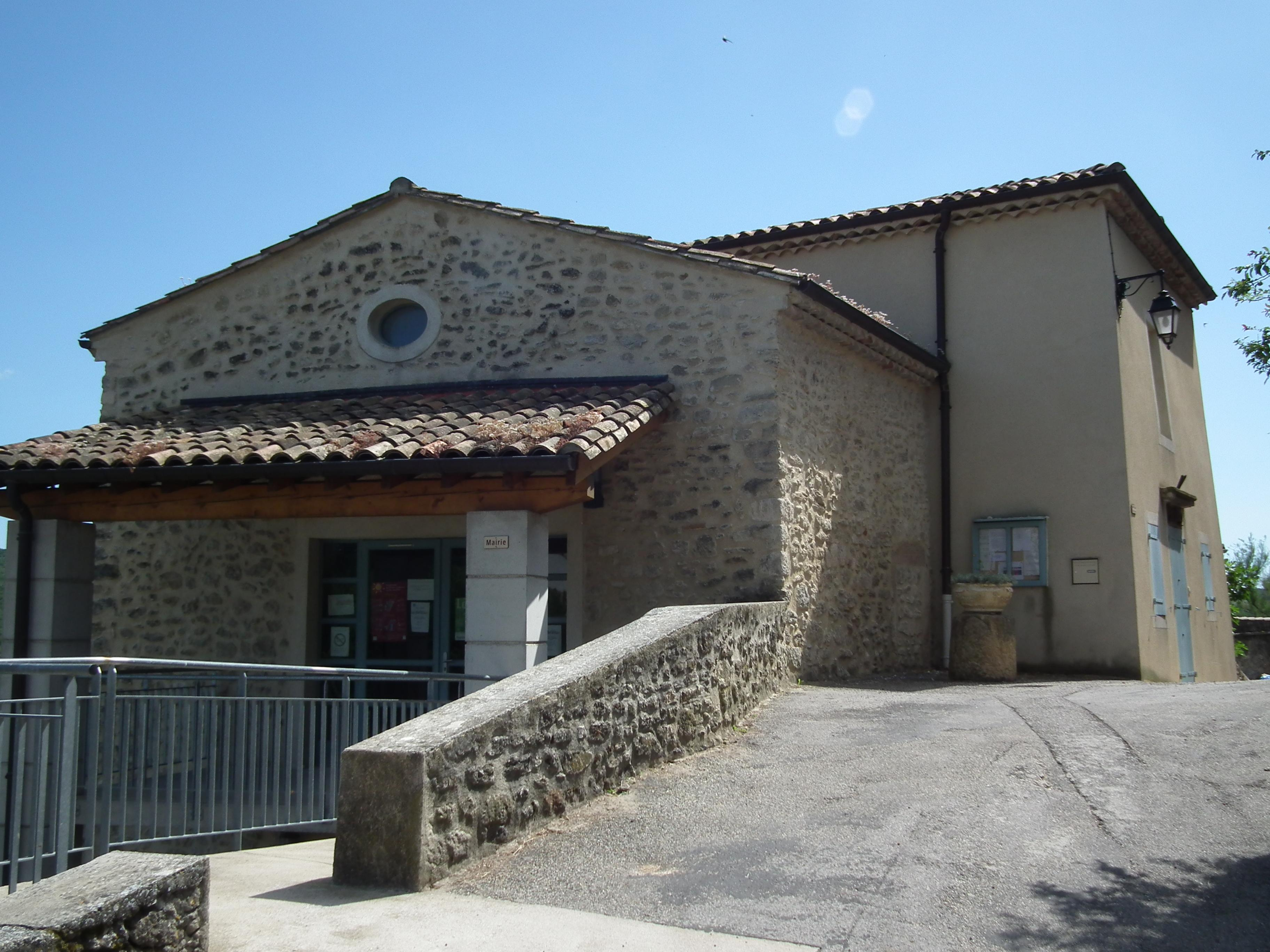
- Town hall
- Location of Autichamp
- Location within France Location within Auvergne-Rhône-Alpes
- Coordinates: 44°40′57″N 4°57′57″E
- Country: France
- Region: Auvergne-Rhône-Alpes
- Department: Drôme
- Arrondissement: Die
- Canton: Crest
- Intercommunality: Val de Drôme en Biovallée

Government
  - Mayor (2020–2026): Denis Lattard
- Area^{1}: 6.25 km^{2} (2.41 sq mi)
- Highest elevation: 485 m (1,591 ft)
- Lowest elevation: 245 m (804 ft)
- Population (2023): 151
  - Density: 24.2/km^{2} (62.6/sq mi)
- Time zone: UTC+01:00 (CET)
  - Summer (DST): UTC+02:00 (CEST)
- INSEE/Postal code: 26021 /26400
- ^{1} French Land Register data, which excludes lakes, ponds, glaciers > 1 km^{2} (0.386 sq mi or 247 acres) and river estuaries.

Autichamp (French pronunciation: [otiʃɑ̃]) is a commune in the Drôme department in southeastern France.

== Population ==
Historical population
Year	Pop.	±% p.a.
1968	114	—
1975	105	−1.17%
1982	115	+1.31%
1990	117	+0.22%
1999	120	+0.28%
2007	145	+2.39%
2012	132	−1.86%
2017	121	−1.73%
2023	151	+3.76%
Source: INSEE

== See also ==
- Communes of the Drôme department
