= La Baume-Cornillane =

- Commune
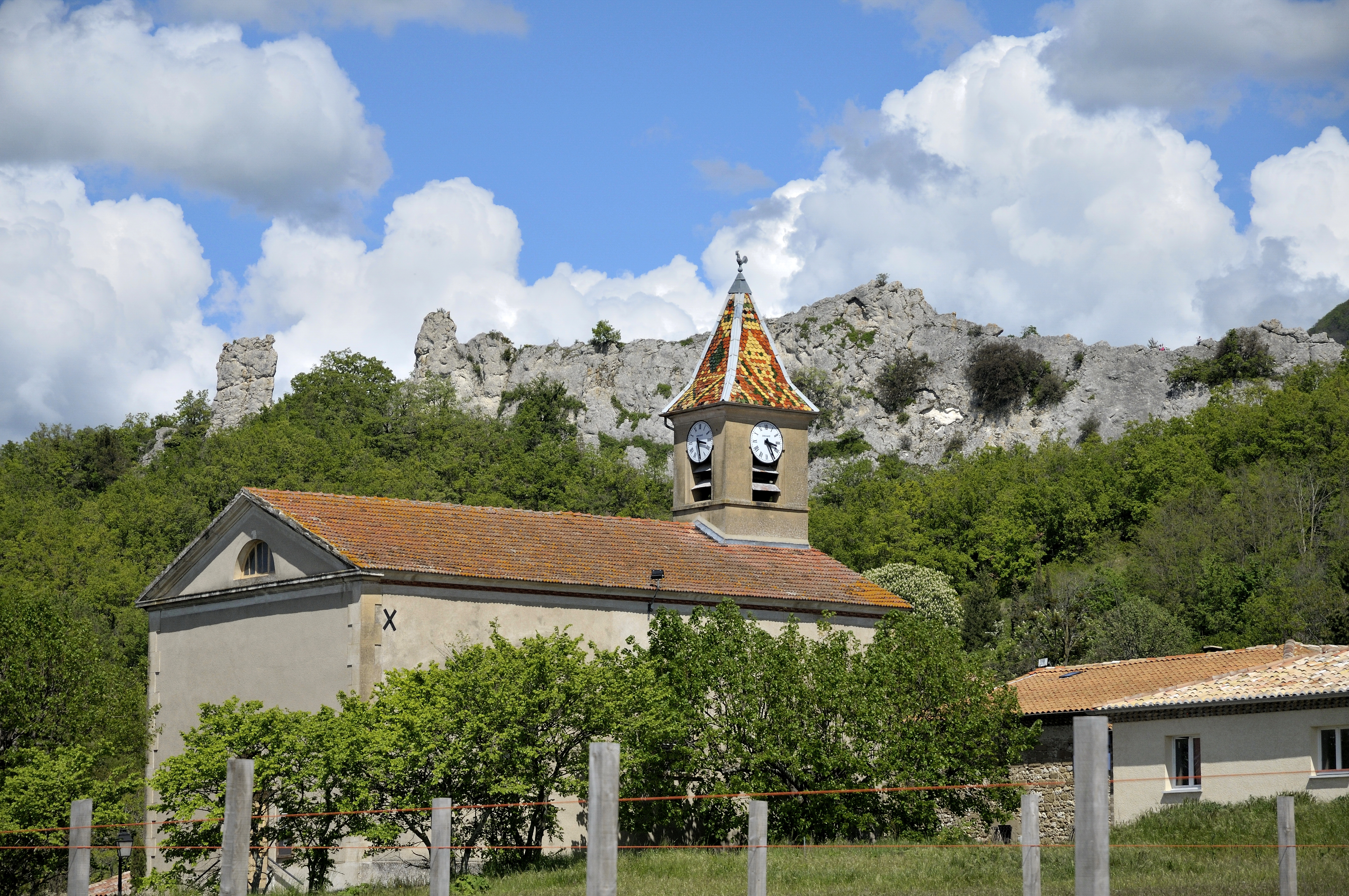
- The church of La Baume-Cornillane
- Location of La Baume-Cornillane
- Location within France Location within Auvergne-Rhône-Alpes
- Coordinates: 44°49′28″N 5°02′28″E
- Country: France
- Region: Auvergne-Rhône-Alpes
- Department: Drôme
- Arrondissement: Valence
- Canton: Crest
- Intercommunality: CA Valence Romans Agglo

Government
  - Mayor (2020–2026): Dominique Sylvestre
- Area^{1}: 14.42 km^{2} (5.57 sq mi)
- Elevation: 308 m (1,010 ft)
- Highest elevation: 1,009 m (3,310 ft)
- Lowest elevation: 230 m (750 ft)
- Population (2023): 456
  - Density: 31.6/km^{2} (81.9/sq mi)
- Time zone: UTC+01:00 (CET)
  - Summer (DST): UTC+02:00 (CEST)
- INSEE/Postal code: 26032 /26120
- ^{1} French Land Register data, which excludes lakes, ponds, glaciers > 1 km^{2} (0.386 sq mi or 247 acres) and river estuaries.

La Baume-Cornillane (French pronunciation: [la bom kɔʁnijan]; Occitan: La Bauma Cornilhana) is a commune in the Drôme department in southeastern France.

== Geography ==
La Baume-Cornillane is located 15 km from Crest and 18 km from Valence. The territory of the municipality consists of three parts: the plain, the foothills of the Vercors Massif and the mountain.

== Population ==
Historical population
Year	Pop.	±% p.a.
1968	203	—
1975	186	−1.24%
1982	245	+4.01%
1990	321	+3.43%
1999	396	+2.36%
2007	442	+1.38%
2012	454	+0.54%
2017	443	−0.49%
2023	456	+0.48%
Source: INSEE

Its inhabitants are called Balmois in French.

== See also ==
- Communes of the Drôme department
