= La Chaudière =

- Commune
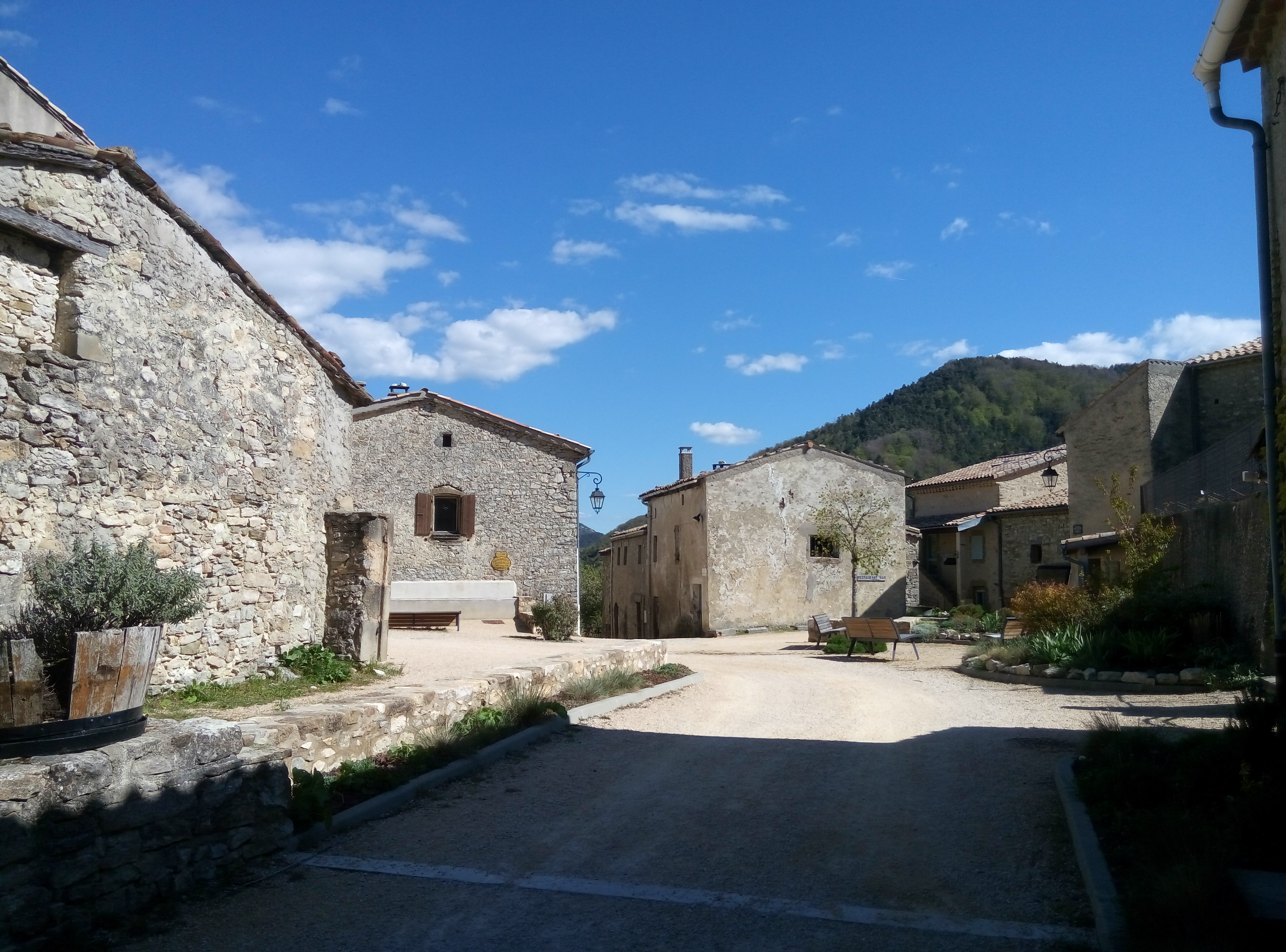
- Location of La Chaudière
- Location within France Location within Auvergne-Rhône-Alpes
- Coordinates: 44°37′57″N 5°13′02″E
- Country: France
- Region: Auvergne-Rhône-Alpes
- Department: Drôme
- Arrondissement: Die
- Canton: Le Diois

Government
  - Mayor (2020–2026): Jean-François Lemery
- Area^{1}: 12.17 km^{2} (4.70 sq mi)
- Highest elevation: 1,560 m (5,120 ft)
- Lowest elevation: 589 m (1,932 ft)
- Population (2023): 25
  - Density: 2.1/km^{2} (5.3/sq mi)
- Time zone: UTC+01:00 (CET)
  - Summer (DST): UTC+02:00 (CEST)
- INSEE/Postal code: 26090 /26340
- ^{1} French Land Register data, which excludes lakes, ponds, glaciers > 1 km^{2} (0.386 sq mi or 247 acres) and river estuaries.

La Chaudière (French pronunciation: [la ʃodjɛʁ]; Occitan: La Chaudèira) is a commune in the Drôme department in southeastern France.

== Population ==
Historical population
Year	Pop.	±% p.a.
1968	17	—
1975	10	−7.30%
1982	9	−1.49%
1990	13	+4.70%
1999	17	+3.03%
2007	22	+3.28%
2012	20	−1.89%
2017	28	+6.96%
2023	25	−1.87%
Source: INSEE

== See also ==
- Communes of the Drôme department
