= Peyrus =

Peyrus Peirús (Occitan)
- Commune
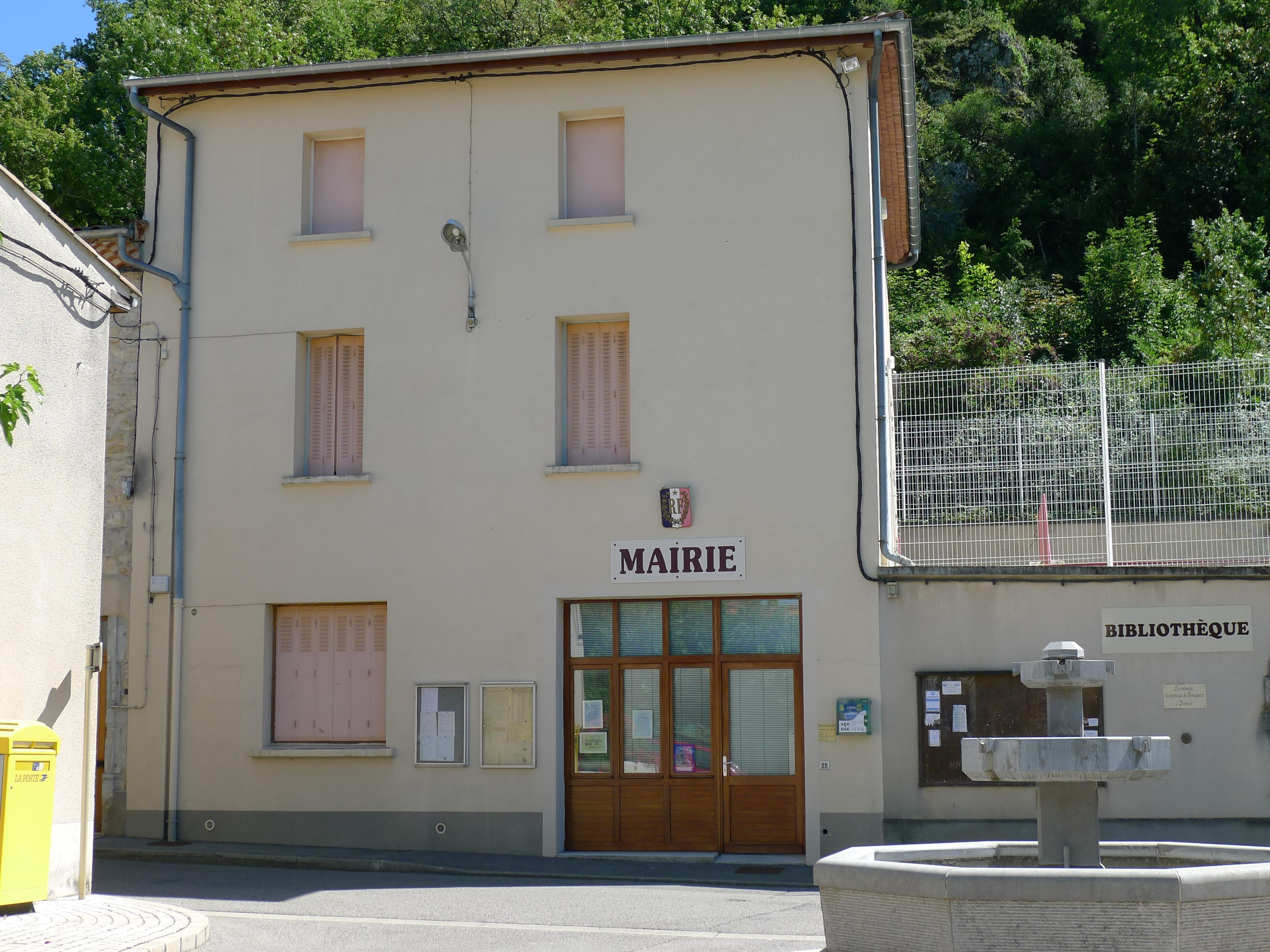
- Town hall

- Coat of arms
- Location of Peyrus
- Location within France Location within Auvergne-Rhône-Alpes
- Coordinates: 44°54′49″N 5°06′32″E
- Country: France
- Region: Auvergne-Rhône-Alpes
- Department: Drôme
- Arrondissement: Valence
- Canton: Crest
- Intercommunality: CA Valence Romans Agglo

Government
  - Mayor (2020–2026): Georges Deloche
- Area^{1}: 10.48 km^{2} (4.05 sq mi)
- Elevation: 386 m (1,266 ft)
- Highest elevation: 1,101 m (3,612 ft)
- Lowest elevation: 338 m (1,109 ft)
- Population (2023): 576
  - Density: 55.0/km^{2} (142/sq mi)
- Demonym: Peyrusiens
- Time zone: UTC+01:00 (CET)
  - Summer (DST): UTC+02:00 (CEST)
- INSEE/Postal code: 26232 /26120
- ^{1} French Land Register data, which excludes lakes, ponds, glaciers > 1 km^{2} (0.386 sq mi or 247 acres) and river estuaries.

Peyrus (French pronunciation: [peʁy]; Occitan: Peirús) is a rural commune in the Drôme department in southeastern France.

== Population ==
Historical population
Year	Pop.	±% p.a.
1968	227	—
1975	249	+1.33%
1982	296	+2.50%
1990	423	+4.56%
1999	488	+1.60%
2007	595	+2.51%
2012	622	+0.89%
2017	606	−0.52%
2023	576	−0.84%
Source: INSEE

== See also ==
- Communes of the Drôme department
