= Plan-de-Baix =

- Commune
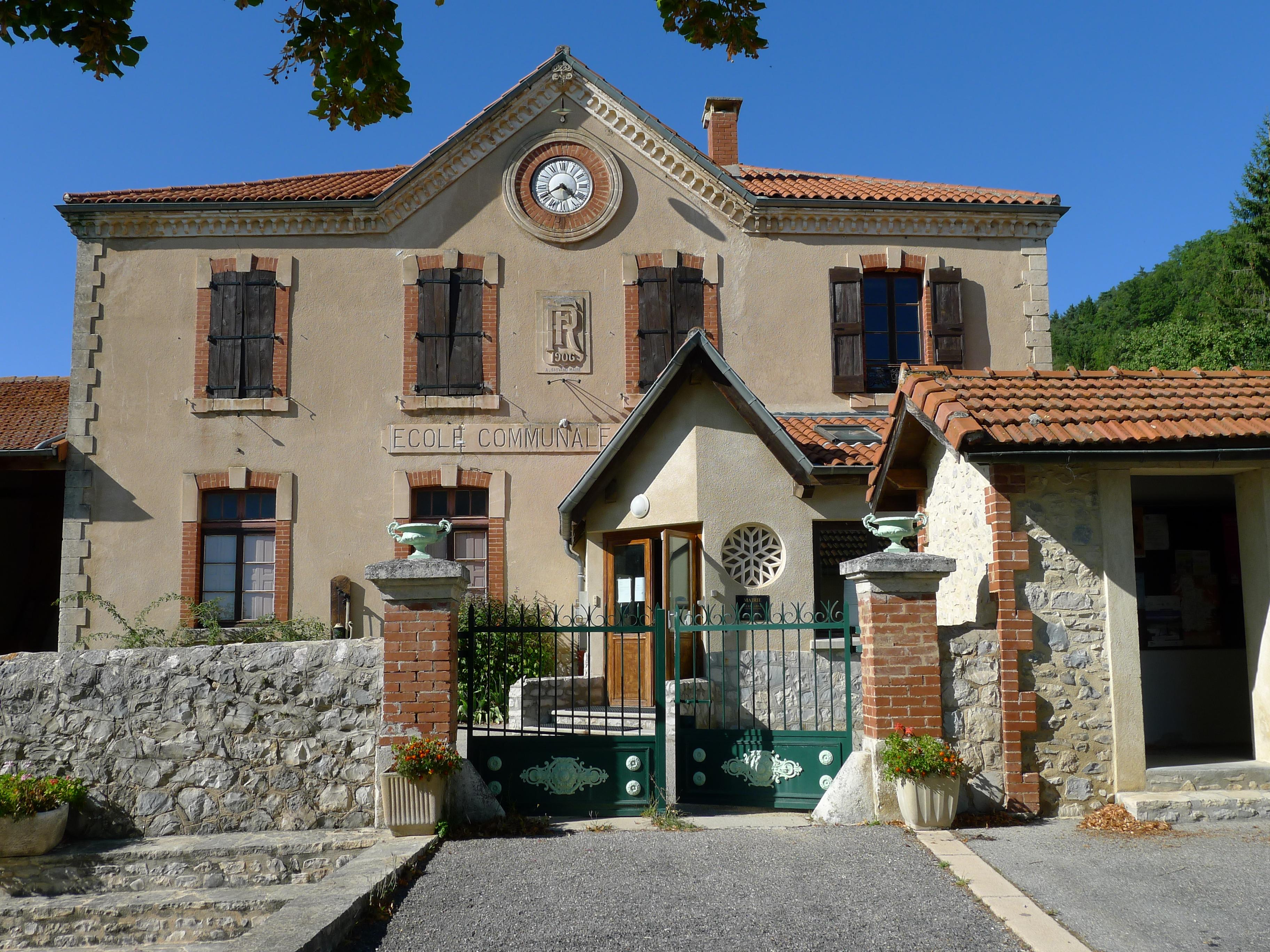
- The town hall of Plan-de-Baix
- Location of Plan-de-Baix
- Location within France Location within Auvergne-Rhône-Alpes
- Coordinates: 44°48′48″N 5°09′59″E
- Country: France
- Region: Auvergne-Rhône-Alpes
- Department: Drôme
- Arrondissement: Die
- Canton: Crest
- Intercommunality: Val de Drôme en Biovallée

Government
  - Mayor (2020–2026): Daniel Cotton
- Area^{1}: 19.39 km^{2} (7.49 sq mi)
- Highest elevation: 1,093 m (3,586 ft)
- Lowest elevation: 349 m (1,145 ft)
- Population (2023): 162
  - Density: 8.35/km^{2} (21.6/sq mi)
- Time zone: UTC+01:00 (CET)
  - Summer (DST): UTC+02:00 (CEST)
- INSEE/Postal code: 26240 /26400
- ^{1} French Land Register data, which excludes lakes, ponds, glaciers > 1 km^{2} (0.386 sq mi or 247 acres) and river estuaries.

Plan-de-Baix is a commune in the Drôme department in southeastern France.

== Population ==
Historical population
Year	Pop.	±% p.a.
1968	142	—
1975	125	−1.81%
1982	139	+1.53%
1990	123	−1.52%
1999	134	+0.96%
2007	143	+0.82%
2012	124	−2.81%
2017	147	+3.46%
2023	162	+1.63%
Source: INSEE

== See also ==
- Communes of the Drôme department
- Parc naturel régional du Vercors
