= Cobonne =

- Commune
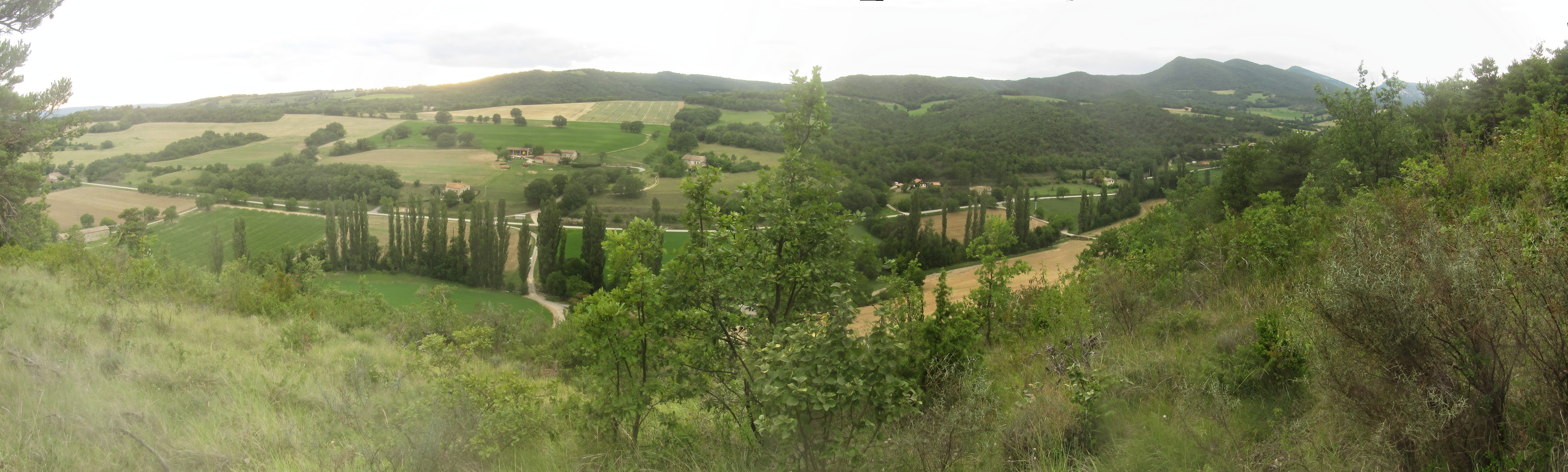
- The Cobonne valley
- Location of Cobonne
- Location within France Location within Auvergne-Rhône-Alpes
- Coordinates: 44°45′37″N 5°04′32″E
- Country: France
- Region: Auvergne-Rhône-Alpes
- Department: Drôme
- Arrondissement: Die
- Canton: Crest
- Intercommunality: Val de Drôme en Biovallée

Government
  - Mayor (2020–2026): Philippe Ribière
- Area^{1}: 11.2 km^{2} (4.3 sq mi)
- Highest elevation: 750 m (2,460 ft)
- Lowest elevation: 231 m (758 ft)
- Population (2023): 170
  - Density: 15/km^{2} (39/sq mi)
- Time zone: UTC+01:00 (CET)
  - Summer (DST): UTC+02:00 (CEST)
- INSEE/Postal code: 26098 /26400
- ^{1} French Land Register data, which excludes lakes, ponds, glaciers > 1 km^{2} (0.386 sq mi or 247 acres) and river estuaries.

Cobonne (French pronunciation: [kɔbɔn]; Occitan: Cobòna) is a commune in the Drôme department in southeastern France.

== Population ==
Historical population
Year	Pop.	±% p.a.
1968	116	—
1975	96	−2.67%
1982	117	+2.87%
1990	119	+0.21%
1999	130	+0.99%
2007	169	+3.33%
2012	166	−0.36%
2017	161	−0.61%
2023	170	+0.91%
Source: INSEE

== See also ==
- Communes of the Drôme department
