= La Roche-sur-Grane =

- Commune
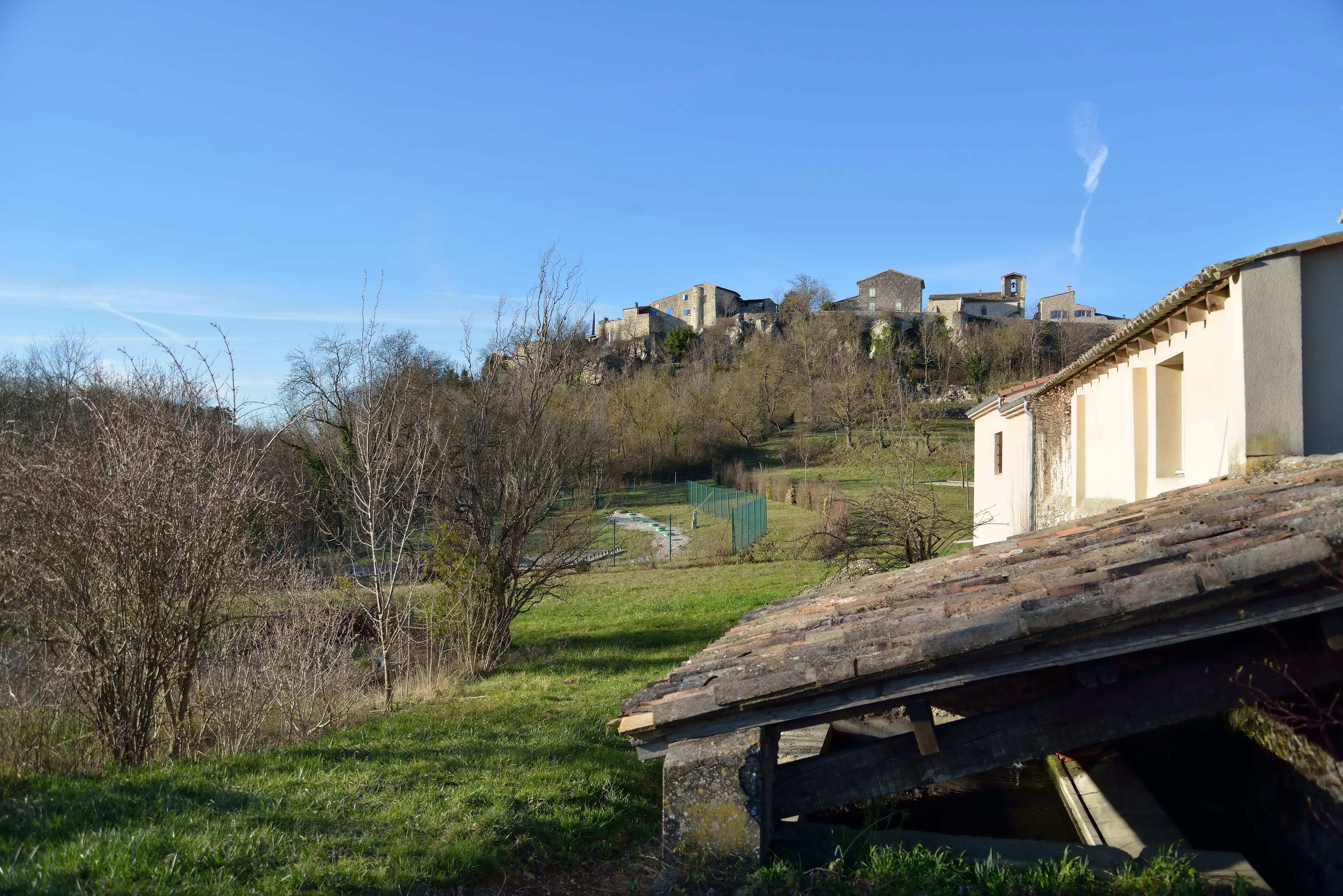
- The village of La Roche-sur-Grane
- Location of La Roche-sur-Grane
- Location within France Location within Auvergne-Rhône-Alpes
- Coordinates: 44°41′00″N 4°56′28″E
- Country: France
- Region: Auvergne-Rhône-Alpes
- Department: Drôme
- Arrondissement: Die
- Canton: Crest
- Intercommunality: Val de Drôme en Biovallée

Government
  - Mayor (2020–2026): Christian Bonnet
- Area^{1}: 12.23 km^{2} (4.72 sq mi)
- Elevation: 220 m (720 ft)
- Highest elevation: 497 m (1,631 ft)
- Lowest elevation: 198 m (650 ft)
- Population (2023): 189
  - Density: 15.5/km^{2} (40.0/sq mi)
- Time zone: UTC+01:00 (CET)
  - Summer (DST): UTC+02:00 (CEST)
- INSEE/Postal code: 26277 /26400
- ^{1} French Land Register data, which excludes lakes, ponds, glaciers > 1 km^{2} (0.386 sq mi or 247 acres) and river estuaries.

La Roche-sur-Grane (French pronunciation: [la ʁɔʃ syʁ ɡʁan], literally La Roche on Grane; Occitan: La Ròcha de Grana) is a commune in the Drôme department in southeastern France.

== Population ==
Historical population
| Year | Pop. | ±% p.a. |
|---|---|---|
| 1968 | 105 | — |
| 1975 | 113 | +1.05% |
| 1982 | 118 | +0.62% |
| 1990 | 137 | +1.88% |
| 1999 | 121 | −1.37% |
| 2007 | 155 | +3.14% |
| 2012 | 165 | +1.26% |
| 2017 | 170 | +0.60% |
| 2023 | 189 | +1.78% |
Source: INSEE

== See also ==
- Communes of the Drôme department
