= Gigors-et-Lozeron =

- Commune
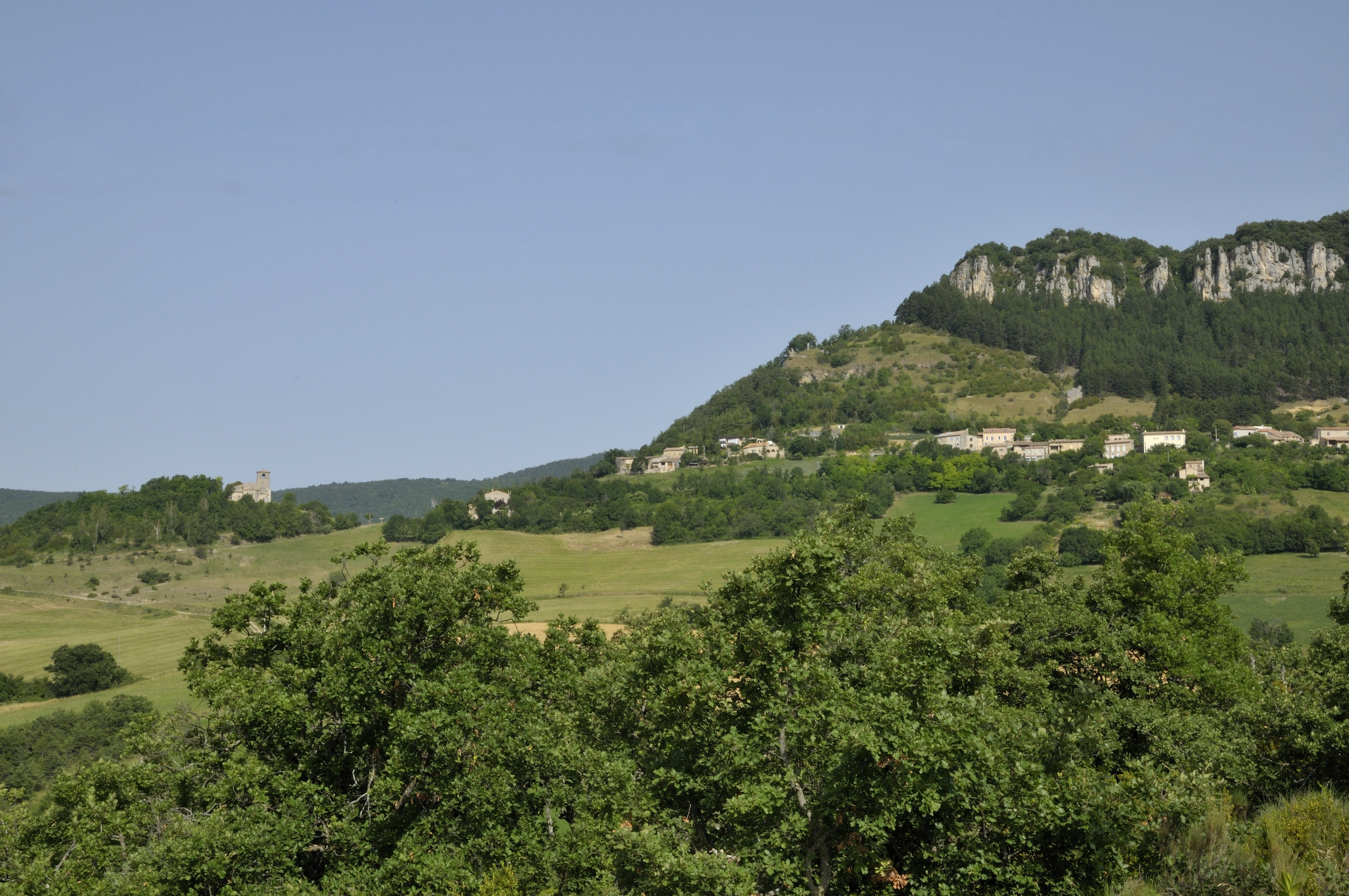
- A general view of Gigors-et-Lozeron
- Location of Gigors-et-Lozeron
- Location within France Location within Auvergne-Rhône-Alpes
- Coordinates: 44°47′41″N 5°06′32″E
- Country: France
- Region: Auvergne-Rhône-Alpes
- Department: Drôme
- Arrondissement: Die
- Canton: Crest
- Intercommunality: Val de Drôme en Biovallée

Government
  - Mayor (2020–2026): David Garayt
- Area^{1}: 35.27 km^{2} (13.62 sq mi)
- Highest elevation: 1,148 m (3,766 ft)
- Lowest elevation: 352 m (1,155 ft)
- Population (2023): 225
  - Density: 6.38/km^{2} (16.5/sq mi)
- Time zone: UTC+01:00 (CET)
  - Summer (DST): UTC+02:00 (CEST)
- INSEE/Postal code: 26141 /26400
- ^{1} French Land Register data, which excludes lakes, ponds, glaciers > 1 km^{2} (0.386 sq mi or 247 acres) and river estuaries.

Gigors-et-Lozeron (French pronunciation: [ʒiɡɔʁ e lozʁɔ̃]; Occitan: Gigòrs e Lauseron) is a commune in the Drôme department in southeastern France.

== Population ==
Historical population
Year	Pop.	±% p.a.
1968	137	—
1975	128	−0.97%
1982	126	−0.22%
1990	135	+0.87%
1999	156	+1.62%
2007	165	+0.70%
2012	166	+0.12%
2017	193	+3.06%
2023	225	+2.59%
Source: INSEE

== See also ==
- Communes of the Drôme department
- Parc naturel régional du Vercors
