= La Répara-Auriples =

- Commune
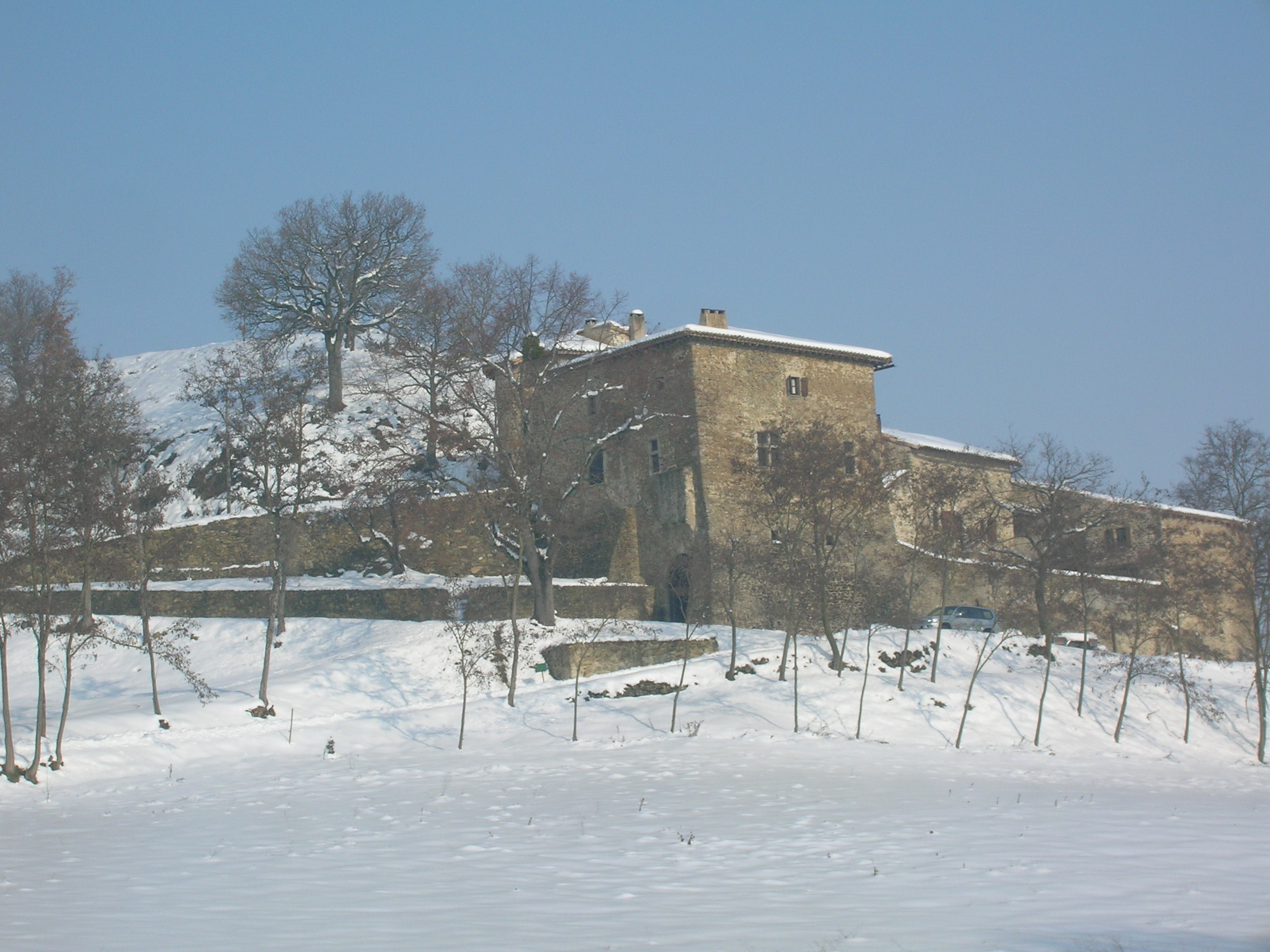
- Chateau of Combet
- Location of La Répara-Auriples
- Location within France Location within Auvergne-Rhône-Alpes
- Coordinates: 44°40′05″N 5°00′25″E
- Country: France
- Region: Auvergne-Rhône-Alpes
- Department: Drôme
- Arrondissement: Die
- Canton: Crest
- Intercommunality: Val de Drôme en Biovallée

Government
  - Mayor (2020–2026): Pierre Boutarin
- Area^{1}: 15.03 km^{2} (5.80 sq mi)
- Elevation: 300 m (980 ft)
- Highest elevation: 534 m (1,752 ft)
- Lowest elevation: 239 m (784 ft)
- Population (2023): 244
  - Density: 16.2/km^{2} (42.0/sq mi)
- Time zone: UTC+01:00 (CET)
  - Summer (DST): UTC+02:00 (CEST)
- INSEE/Postal code: 26020 /26400
- ^{1} French Land Register data, which excludes lakes, ponds, glaciers > 1 km^{2} (0.386 sq mi or 247 acres) and river estuaries.

La Répara-Auriples (French pronunciation: [la ʁepaʁa oʁipl]; Occitan: La Reparaa e Auriple) is a commune in the Drôme department in southeastern France.

== Population ==
Historical population
Year	Pop.	±% p.a.
1968	192	—
1975	166	−2.06%
1982	178	+1.00%
1990	210	+2.09%
1999	230	+1.02%
2007	222	−0.44%
2012	240	+1.57%
2017	235	−0.42%
2023	244	+0.63%
Source: INSEE

== See also ==
- Communes of the Drôme department
