= Barcelonne =

- Commune
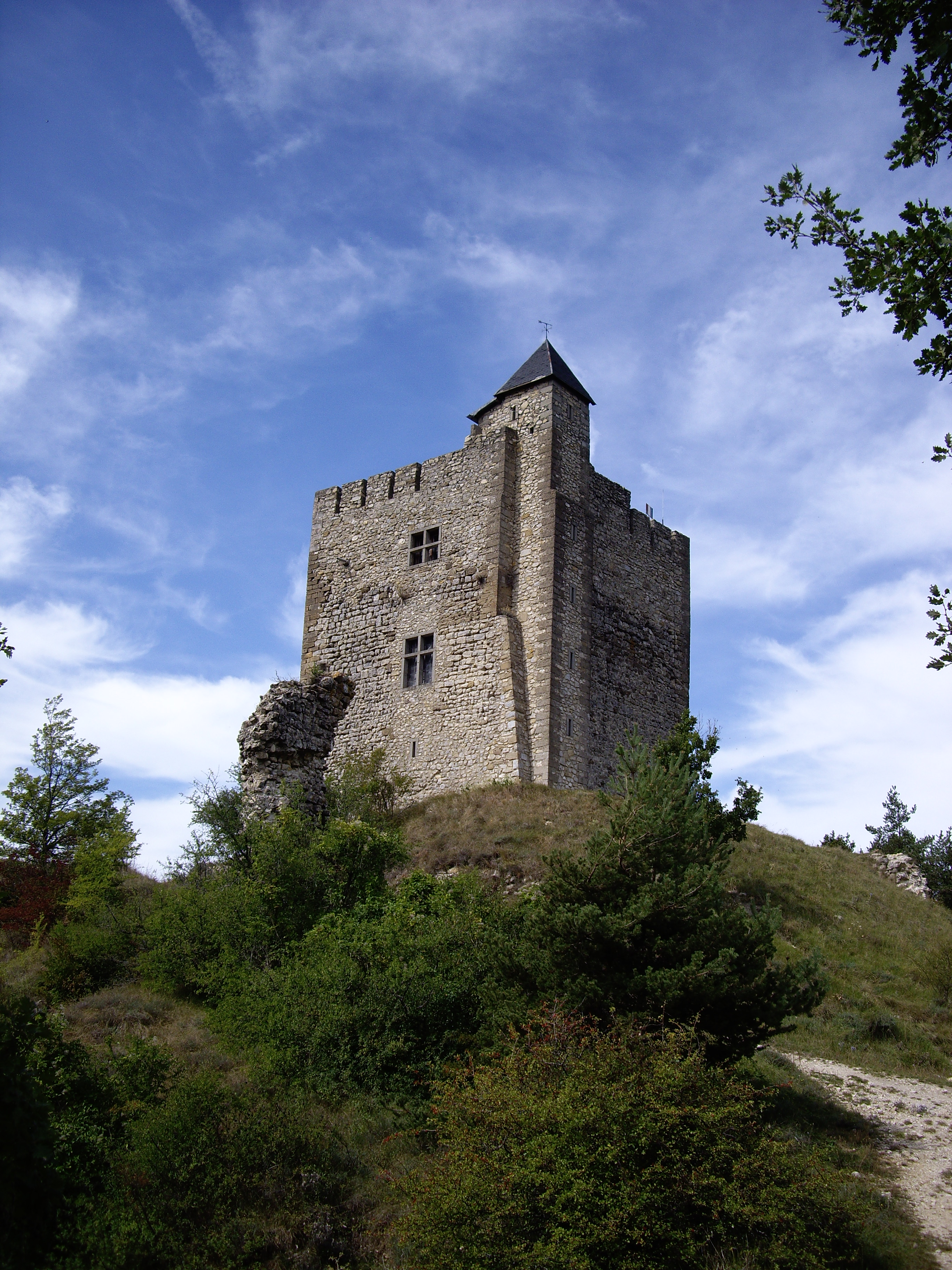
- Medieval tower
- Location of Barcelonne
- Location within France Location within Auvergne-Rhône-Alpes
- Coordinates: 44°52′10″N 5°03′04″E
- Country: France
- Region: Auvergne-Rhône-Alpes
- Department: Drôme
- Arrondissement: Valence
- Canton: Crest
- Intercommunality: CA Valence Romans Agglo

Government
  - Mayor (2023–2026): Johanna Rimet
- Area^{1}: 8.28 km^{2} (3.20 sq mi)
- Elevation: 453 m (1,486 ft)
- Highest elevation: 617 m (2,024 ft)
- Lowest elevation: 233 m (764 ft)
- Population (2023): 335
  - Density: 40.5/km^{2} (105/sq mi)
- Time zone: UTC+01:00 (CET)
  - Summer (DST): UTC+02:00 (CEST)
- INSEE/Postal code: 26024 /26120
- ^{1} French Land Register data, which excludes lakes, ponds, glaciers > 1 km^{2} (0.386 sq mi or 247 acres) and river estuaries.

Barcelonne (French pronunciation: [baʁsəlɔn]; Occitan: Barcilona) is a commune in the Drôme department in southeastern France.

== Population ==
Historical population
Year	Pop.	±% p.a.
1968	152	—
1975	157	+0.46%
1982	233	+5.80%
1990	347	+5.10%
1999	370	+0.72%
2007	360	−0.34%
2012	351	−0.51%
2017	349	−0.11%
2023	335	−0.68%
Source: INSEE

== See also ==
- Communes of the Drôme department
