= Arrondissement of Die =

Coordinates: 44°45′15″N 5°22′10″E

Die
- Arrondissement
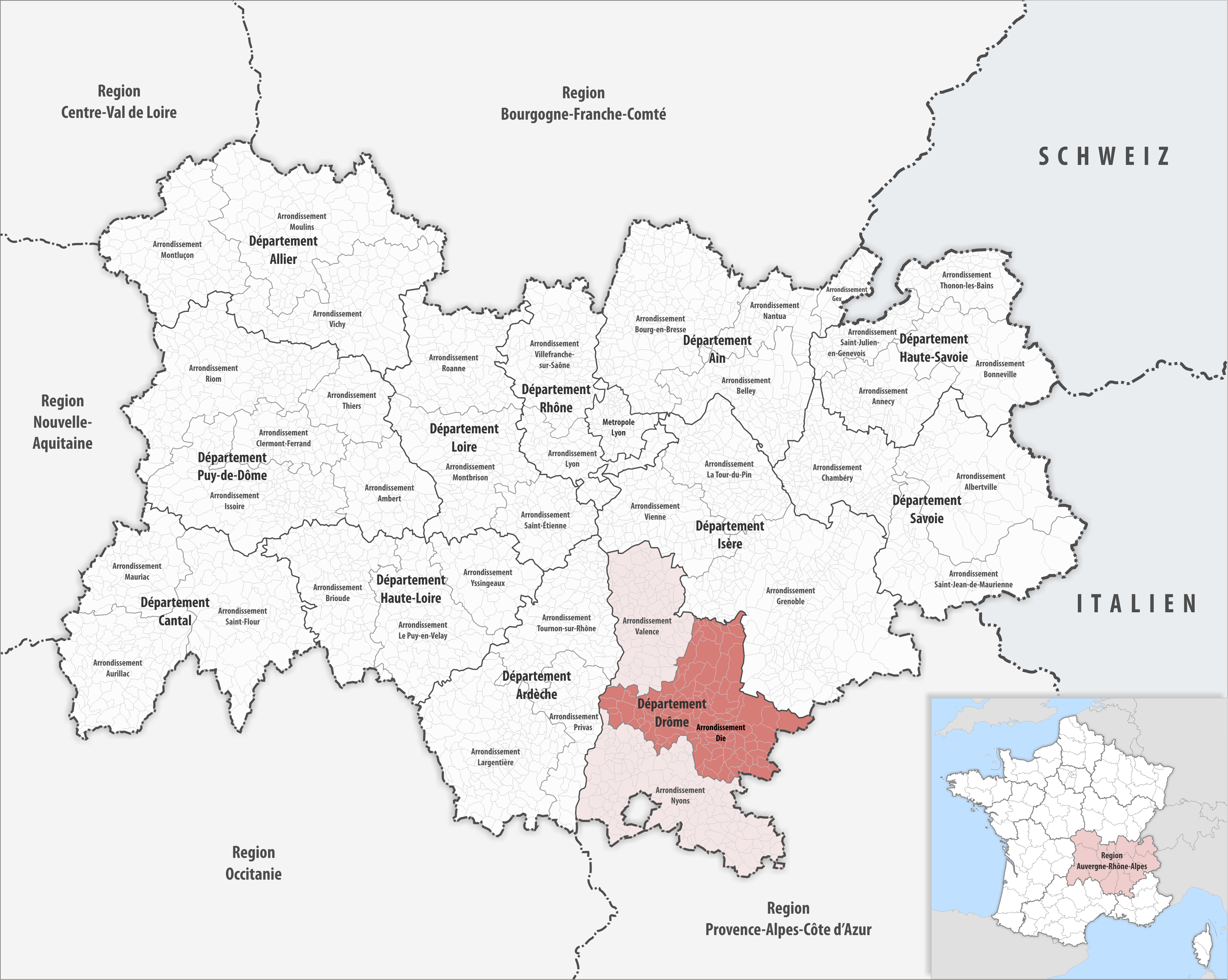
- Location within the region Auvergne-Rhône-Alpes
- Country: France
- Region: Auvergne-Rhône-Alpes
- Department: Drôme
- No. of communes: {{{nbcomm}}}
- Area: 2,524.0 km^{2} (974.5 sq mi)
- Population (2023): 69,414
  - Density: 27.502/km^{2} (71.229/sq mi)
- INSEE code: 261

The arrondissement of Die is an arrondissement in the Drôme department in the Auvergne-Rhône-Alpes region of France. It has 111 communes. Its population is 68,574 (2021), and its area is 2,524.0 km^{2} (974.5 sq mi).

== Composition ==
The communes (with their INSEE codes) of the arrondissement of Die are:

1. Allex (26006)
2. Ambonil (26007)
3. Aouste-sur-Sye (26011)
4. Arnayon (26012)
5. Aubenasson (26015)
6. Aucelon (26017)
7. Aurel (26019)
8. Autichamp (26021)
9. Barnave (26025)
10. Barsac (26027)
11. La Bâtie-des-Fonds (26030)
12. Beaufort-sur-Gervanne (26035)
13. Beaumont-en-Diois (26036)
14. Beaurières (26040)
15. Bellegarde-en-Diois (26047)
16. Boulc (26055)
17. Bouvante (26059)
18. Brette (26062)
19. Chabrillan (26065)
20. Le Chaffal (26066)
21. Chalancon (26067)
22. Chamaloc (26069)
23. La Chapelle-en-Vercors (26074)
24. La Chaudière (26090)
25. Charens (26076)
26. Chastel-Arnaud (26080)
27. Châtillon-en-Diois (26086)
28. Cliousclat (26097)
29. Cobonne (26098)
30. Crest (26108)
31. Die (26113)
32. Divajeu (26115)
33. Échevis (26117)
34. Espenel (26122)
35. Establet (26123)
36. Eurre (26125)
37. Eygluy-Escoulin (26128)
38. Félines-sur-Rimandoule (26134)
39. Francillon-sur-Roubion (26137)
40. Gigors-et-Lozeron (26141)
41. Glandage (26142)
42. Grane (26144)
43. Gumiane (26147)
44. Jonchères (26152)
45. Laval-d'Aix (26159)
46. Léoncel (26163)
47. Lesches-en-Diois (26164)
48. Livron-sur-Drôme (26165)
49. Loriol-sur-Drôme (26166)
50. Luc-en-Diois (26167)
51. Lus-la-Croix-Haute (26168)
52. Marignac-en-Diois (26175)
53. Menglon (26178)
54. Mirabel-et-Blacons (26183)
55. Mirmande (26185)
56. Miscon (26186)
57. Montclar-sur-Gervanne (26195)
58. Montlaur-en-Diois (26204)
59. Montmaur-en-Diois (26205)
60. Montoison (26208)
61. Mornans (26214)
62. La Motte-Chalancon (26215)
63. La Motte-Fanjas (26217)
64. Omblèze (26221)
65. Oriol-en-Royans (26223)
66. Pennes-le-Sec (26228)
67. Piégros-la-Clastre (26234)
68. Plan-de-Baix (26240)
69. Le Poët-Célard (26241)
70. Ponet-et-Saint-Auban (26246)
71. Pontaix (26248)
72. Poyols (26253)
73. Pradelle (26254)
74. Les Prés (26255)
75. Recoubeau-Jansac (26262)
76. La Répara-Auriples (26020)
77. Rimon-et-Savel (26266)
78. Rochechinard (26270)
79. Rochefourchat (26274)
80. La Roche-sur-Grane (26277)
81. Romeyer (26282)
82. Rottier (26283)
83. Saillans (26289)
84. Saint-Agnan-en-Vercors (26290)
85. Saint-Andéol (26291)
86. Saint-Benoit-en-Diois (26296)
87. Saint-Dizier-en-Diois (26300)
88. Sainte-Croix (26299)
89. Sainte-Eulalie-en-Royans (26302)
90. Saint-Jean-en-Royans (26307)
91. Saint-Julien-en-Quint (26308)
92. Saint-Julien-en-Vercors (26309)
93. Saint-Laurent-en-Royans (26311)
94. Saint-Martin-en-Vercors (26315)
95. Saint-Martin-le-Colonel (26316)
96. Saint-Nazaire-en-Royans (26320)
97. Saint-Nazaire-le-Désert (26321)
98. Saint-Roman (26327)
99. Saint-Sauveur-en-Diois (26328)
100. Saint-Thomas-en-Royans (26331)
101. Saou (26336)
102. Solaure-en-Diois (26001)
103. Soyans (26344)
104. Suze (26346)
105. Vachères-en-Quint (26359)
106. Valdrôme (26361)
107. Val-Maravel (26136)
108. Vassieux-en-Vercors (26364)
109. Vaunaveys-la-Rochette (26365)
110. Vercheny (26368)
111. Volvent (26378)

== History ==
The arrondissement of Die was created in 1800. At the January 2017 reorganisation of the arrondissements of Drôme, it gained 17 communes from the arrondissement of Valence, and it lost six communes to the arrondissement of Nyons and one commune to the arrondissement of Valence.

As a result of the reorganisation of the cantons of France which came into effect in 2015, the borders of the cantons are no longer related to the borders of the arrondissements. The cantons of the arrondissement of Die were, as of January 2015:

1. Bourdeaux
2. La Chapelle-en-Vercors
3. Châtillon-en-Diois
4. Crest-Nord
5. Crest-Sud
6. Die
7. Luc-en-Diois
8. La Motte-Chalancon
9. Saillans
