= Montvendre =

- Commune
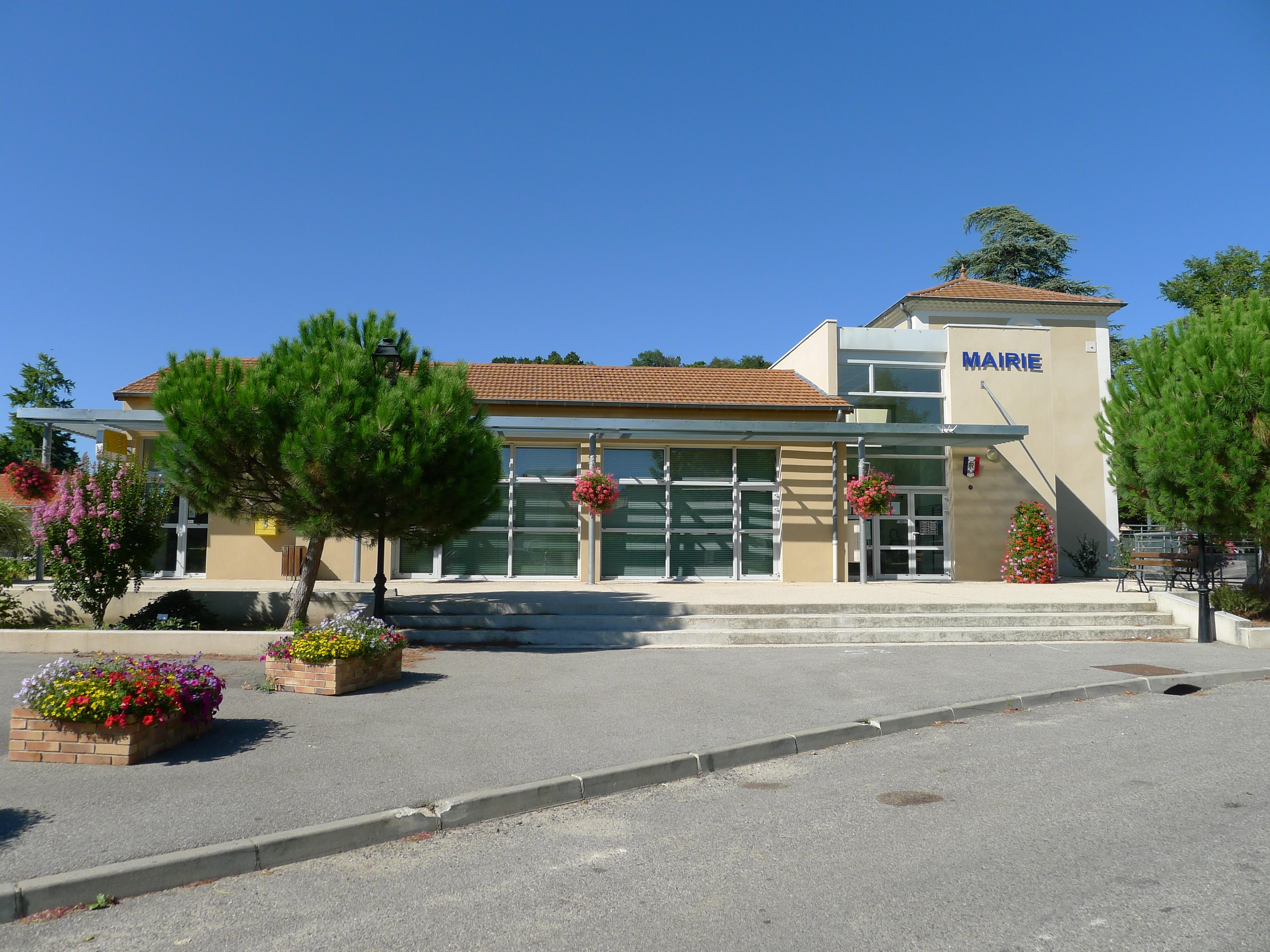
- The town hall of Montvendre
- Location of Montvendre
- Location within France Location within Auvergne-Rhône-Alpes
- Coordinates: 44°52′21″N 5°01′24″E
- Country: France
- Region: Auvergne-Rhône-Alpes
- Department: Drôme
- Arrondissement: Valence
- Canton: Crest
- Intercommunality: CA Valence Romans Agglo

Government
  - Mayor (2020–2026): Bruno Servian
- Area^{1}: 17.24 km^{2} (6.66 sq mi)
- Elevation: 209 m (686 ft)
- Highest elevation: 646 m (2,119 ft)
- Lowest elevation: 157 m (515 ft)
- Population (2023): 1,292
  - Density: 74.94/km^{2} (194.1/sq mi)
- Time zone: UTC+01:00 (CET)
  - Summer (DST): UTC+02:00 (CEST)
- INSEE/Postal code: 26212 /26120
- ^{1} French Land Register data, which excludes lakes, ponds, glaciers > 1 km^{2} (0.386 sq mi or 247 acres) and river estuaries.

Montvendre (French pronunciation: [mɔ̃vɑ̃dʁ]) is a commune in the Drôme department in southeastern France.

== Population ==
Historical population
Year	Pop.	±% p.a.
1968	629	—
1975	600	−0.67%
1982	634	+0.79%
1990	743	+2.00%
1999	857	+1.60%
2007	1,015	+2.14%
2012	1,083	+1.31%
2017	1,185	+1.82%
2023	1,292	+1.45%
Source: INSEE

== See also ==
- Communes of the Drôme department
