= Aurel, Drôme =

Aurel
- Commune
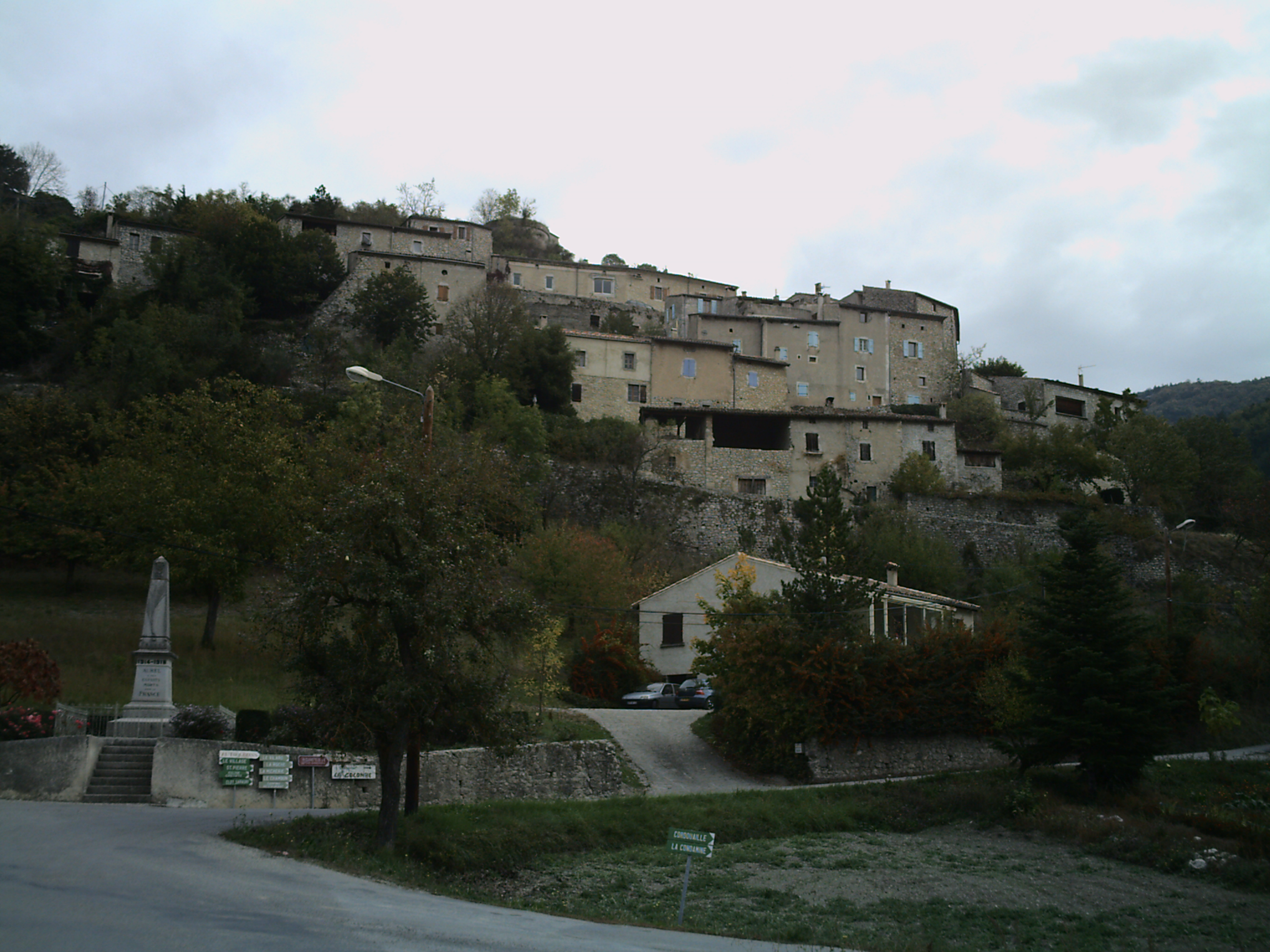
- A view of the village of Aurel
- Location of Aurel
- Location within France Location within Auvergne-Rhône-Alpes
- Coordinates: 44°41′47″N 5°17′58″E
- Country: France
- Region: Auvergne-Rhône-Alpes
- Department: Drôme
- Arrondissement: Die
- Canton: Le Diois
- Intercommunality: Crestois et Pays de Saillans Cœur de Drôme

Government
  - Mayor (2020–2026): Jean-Christophe Aubert
- Area^{1}: 26.26 km^{2} (10.14 sq mi)
- Elevation: 405 m (1,329 ft)
- Highest elevation: 1,247 m (4,091 ft)
- Lowest elevation: 289 m (948 ft)
- Population (2023): 271
  - Density: 10.3/km^{2} (26.7/sq mi)
- Time zone: UTC+01:00 (CET)
  - Summer (DST): UTC+02:00 (CEST)
- INSEE/Postal code: 26019 /26340
- ^{1} French Land Register data, which excludes lakes, ponds, glaciers > 1 km^{2} (0.386 sq mi or 247 acres) and river estuaries.

Aurel (French pronunciation: [oʁɛl]; Occitan: Aurèl) is a commune in the Drôme department in southeastern France.

== Population ==
Historical population
Year	Pop.	±% p.a.
1968	228	—
1975	199	−1.92%
1982	204	+0.36%
1990	204	+0.00%
1999	205	+0.05%
2007	222	+1.00%
2012	243	+1.82%
2017	245	+0.16%
2023	271	+1.70%
Source: INSEE

== See also ==
- Communes of the Drôme department
