= Canton of Crest =

Coordinates: 44.73°N 5.02°E

The canton of Crest is an administrative division of the Drôme department, southeastern France. It was created at the French canton reorganisation which came into effect in March 2015. Its seat is in Crest.

It consists of the following communes:

1. Aouste-sur-Sye
2. Autichamp
3. Barcelonne
4. La Baume-Cornillane
5. Beaufort-sur-Gervanne
6. Chabrillan
7. Châteaudouble
8. Cobonne
9. Combovin
10. Crest
11. Divajeu
12. Eurre
13. Gigors-et-Lozeron
14. Grane
15. Mirabel-et-Blacons
16. Montclar-sur-Gervanne
17. Montmeyran
18. Montvendre
19. Omblèze
20. Ourches
21. Peyrus
22. Piégros-la-Clastre
23. Plan-de-Baix
24. La Répara-Auriples
25. La Roche-sur-Grane
26. Suze
27. Upie
28. Vaunaveys-la-Rochette
