= Barnave, Drôme =

Barnave
- Commune
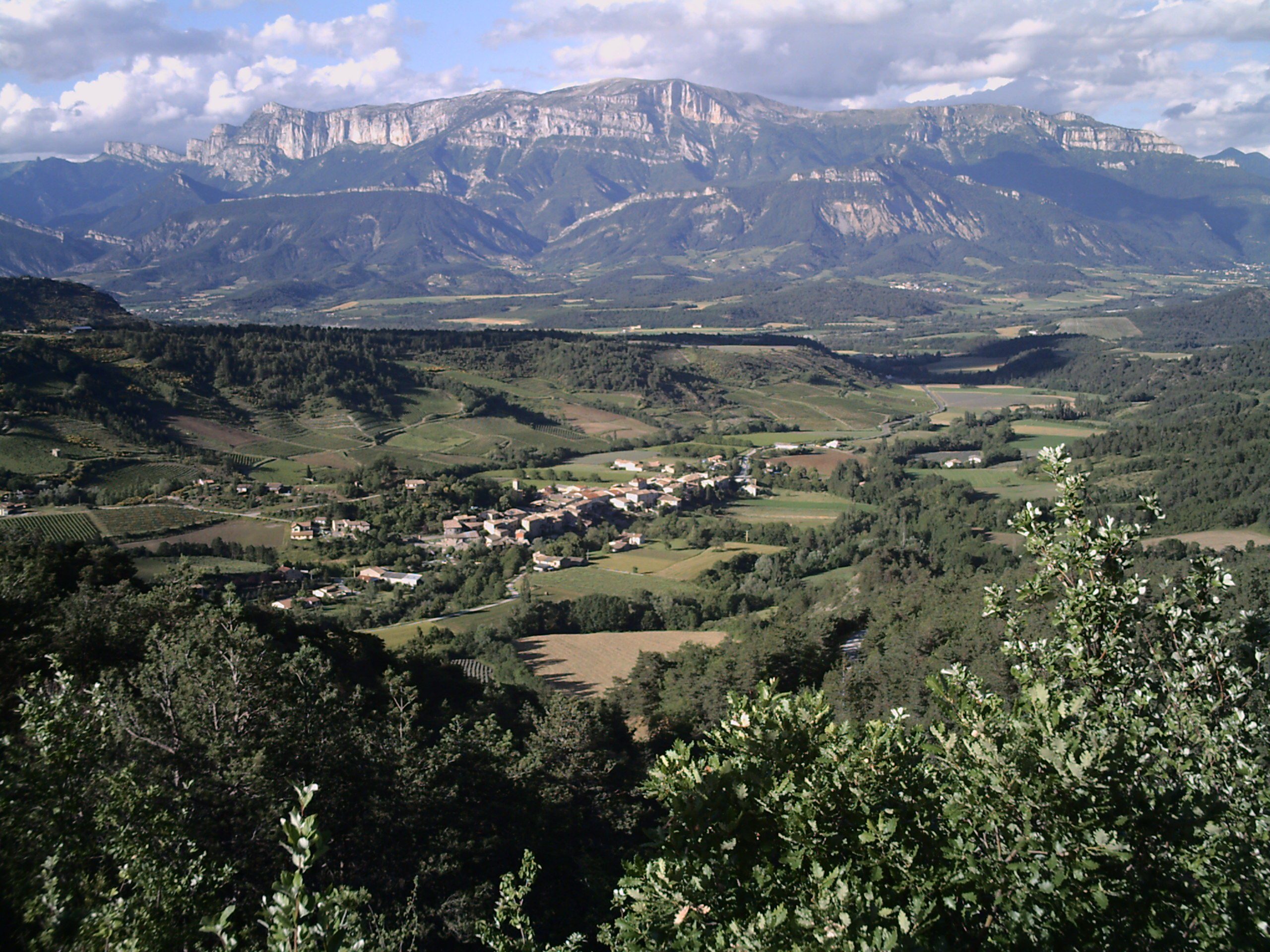
- The village and the Glandasse mountain
- Location of Barnave
- Location within France Location within Auvergne-Rhône-Alpes
- Coordinates: 44°39′39″N 5°22′15″E
- Country: France
- Region: Auvergne-Rhône-Alpes
- Department: Drôme
- Arrondissement: Die
- Canton: Le Diois
- Intercommunality: Diois

Government
  - Mayor (2025–2026): Florent Serratrice
- Area^{1}: 13.06 km^{2} (5.04 sq mi)
- Highest elevation: 1,339 m (4,393 ft)
- Lowest elevation: 474 m (1,555 ft)
- Population (2023): 217
  - Density: 16.6/km^{2} (43.0/sq mi)
- Time zone: UTC+01:00 (CET)
  - Summer (DST): UTC+02:00 (CEST)
- INSEE/Postal code: 26025 /26310
- ^{1} French Land Register data, which excludes lakes, ponds, glaciers > 1 km^{2} (0.386 sq mi or 247 acres) and river estuaries.

Barnave is a commune in the Drôme department in southeastern France.

== Geography ==
Barnave is a small village opposite to the Dome Pie Ferre (2040m) of Glandasse. The territory is crossed by the Barnavette River, a small creek which empties into the Drôme. The village lies 13 kilometres from the canton capital of Luc-en-Diois.

=== Hamlets ===
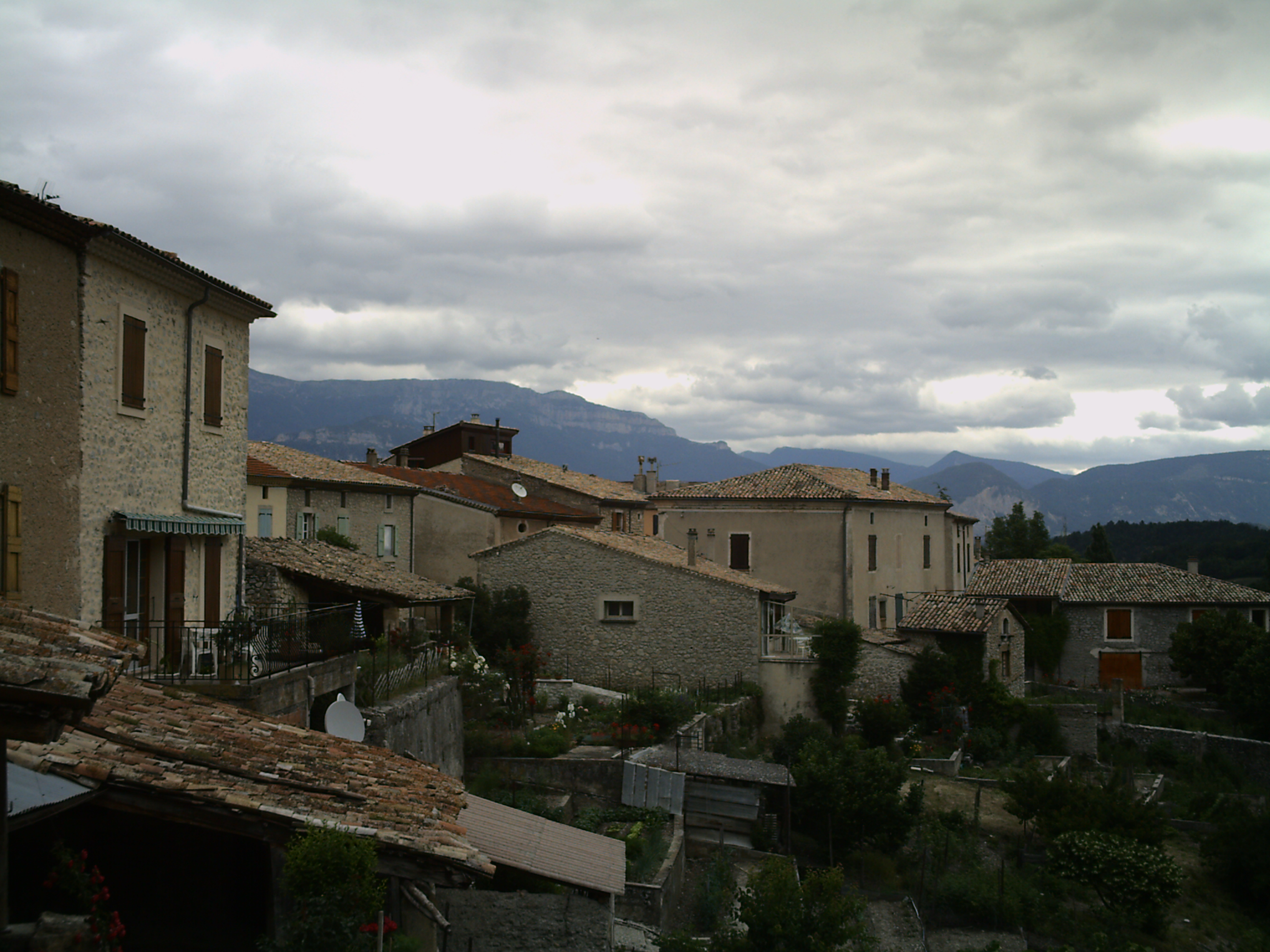

- Le Serre: A sheep farm destined for organic meat production.
- La Louine: Contains three residential houses and two farms. The distillery, formerly owned by the CUMA, dates from 1946 but the structure fell into ruin, and was sold in 2007 and is now in production again.
- La Bégude: Residential hamlet.
- Le Moulin de Jansac: Housing, largely dependent on Recoubeau-Jansac.
- La Perlette: The hamlet now has more than one farm and is about 3 km from the village as the crow flies, on the other side of the Drôme.
- Les Brunets: Imposing farmhouse converted into a second home.

== Population ==
Historical population
Year	Pop.	±% p.a.
1968	117	—
1975	109	−1.01%
1982	119	+1.26%
1990	125	+0.62%
1999	155	+2.42%
2007	156	+0.08%
2012	170	+1.73%
2017	198	+3.10%
2023	217	+1.54%
Source: INSEE

== Architecture ==
The typical architecture of houses in the village of Barnave is a mixture of Roman influences and early medieval. The stone extracted from fields and limestone form the basis for almost all houses that make up the village. There are still significant remnants of feudal times in Barnave. The ruins of the old village are still visible, as is the traces of a castle. A large portion of the castle wall is still standing. The commune also contains a nineteenth-century church and a temple.

== See also ==
- Communes of the Drôme department
