= Eurre =

- Commune
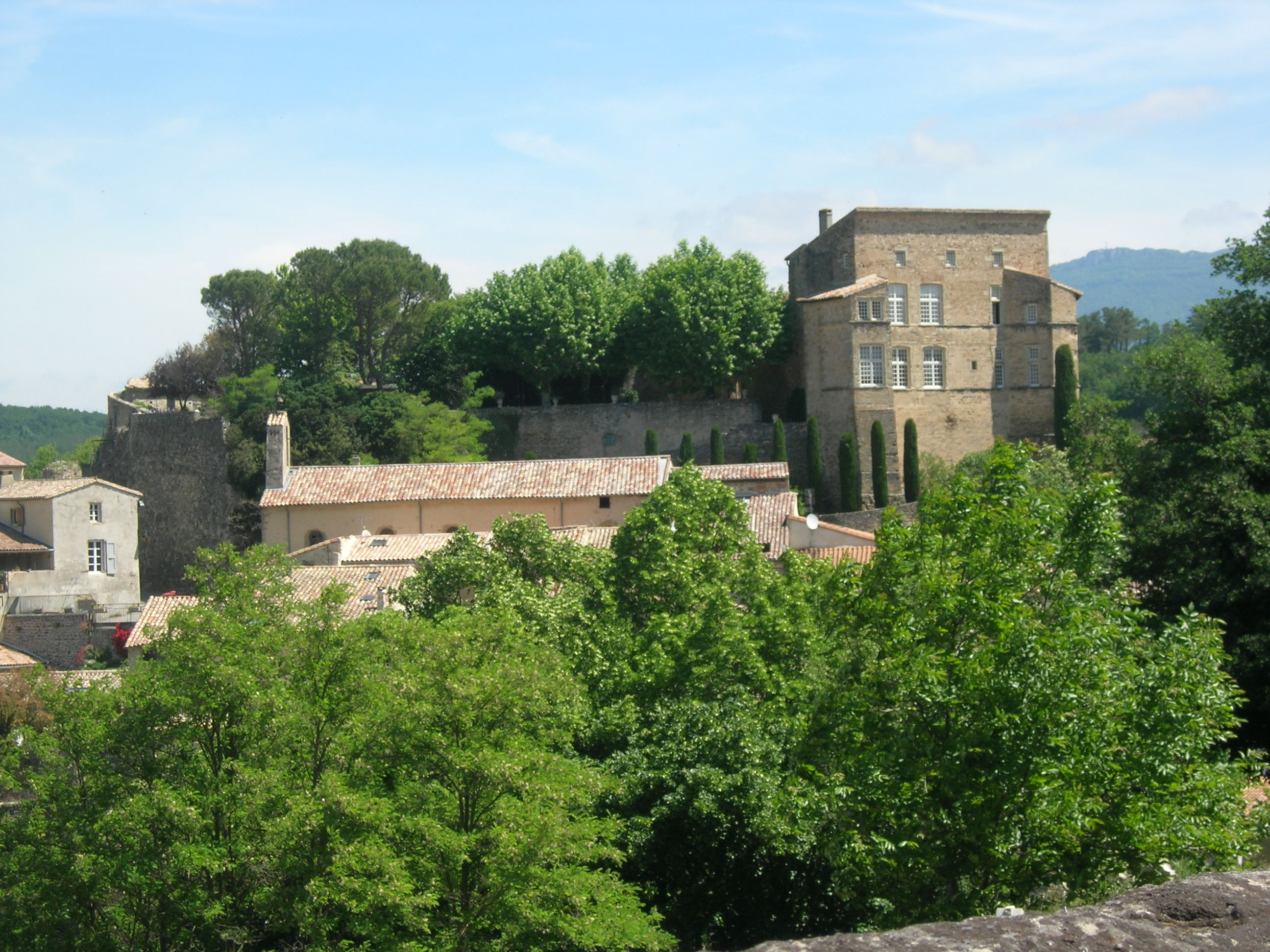
- Château d'Eurre

- Coat of arms
- Location of Eurre
- Location within France Location within Auvergne-Rhône-Alpes
- Coordinates: 44°45′37″N 4°59′22″E
- Country: France
- Region: Auvergne-Rhône-Alpes
- Department: Drôme
- Arrondissement: Die
- Canton: Crest
- Intercommunality: Val de Drôme en Biovallée

Government
  - Mayor (2020–2026): Jean Serret
- Area^{1}: 18.06 km^{2} (6.97 sq mi)
- Highest elevation: 415 m (1,362 ft)
- Lowest elevation: 149 m (489 ft)
- Population (2023): 1,431
  - Density: 79.24/km^{2} (205.2/sq mi)
- Time zone: UTC+01:00 (CET)
  - Summer (DST): UTC+02:00 (CEST)
- INSEE/Postal code: 26125 /26400
- ^{1} French Land Register data, which excludes lakes, ponds, glaciers > 1 km^{2} (0.386 sq mi or 247 acres) and river estuaries.

Eurre (French pronunciation: [œʁ]; Occitan: Uèrre) is a commune in the Drôme department in the Auvergne-Rhône-Alpes region in southeastern France.

== Population ==
Historical population
Year	Pop.	±% p.a.
1968	684	—
1975	643	−0.88%
1982	817	+3.48%
1990	923	+1.54%
1999	1,018	+1.09%
2007	1,103	+1.01%
2012	1,171	+1.20%
2017	1,334	+2.64%
2023	1,431	+1.18%
Source: INSEE

== See also ==
- Communes of the Drôme department
