= Divajeu =

- Commune
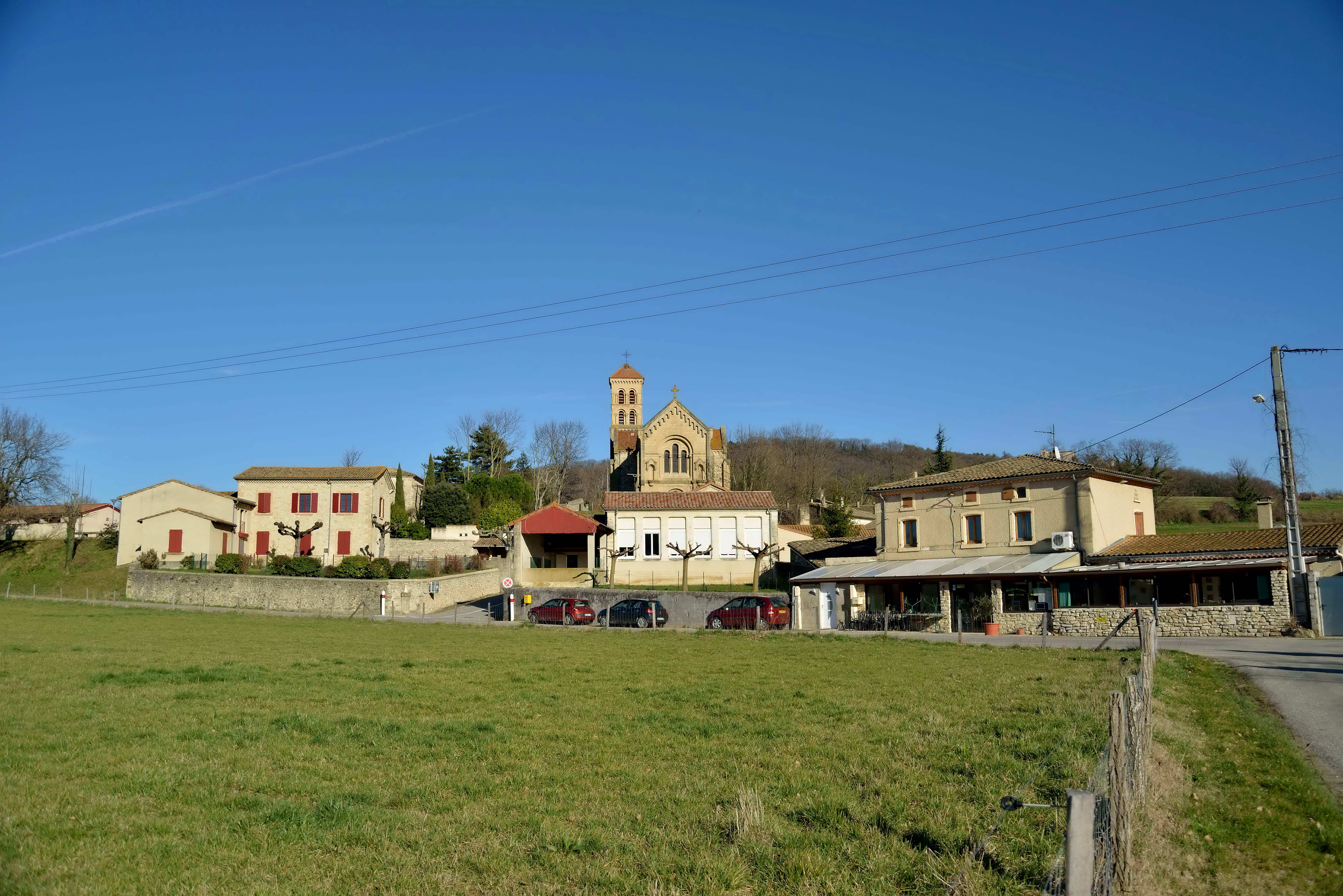
- A general view of Divajeu
- Location of Divajeu
- Location within France Location within Auvergne-Rhône-Alpes
- Coordinates: 44°42′19″N 5°00′20″E
- Country: France
- Region: Auvergne-Rhône-Alpes
- Department: Drôme
- Arrondissement: Die
- Canton: Crest
- Intercommunality: Val de Drôme en Biovallée

Government
  - Mayor (2020–2026): René Estéoulle
- Area^{1}: 13.25 km^{2} (5.12 sq mi)
- Highest elevation: 467 m (1,532 ft)
- Lowest elevation: 163 m (535 ft)
- Population (2023): 688
  - Density: 51.9/km^{2} (134/sq mi)
- Time zone: UTC+01:00 (CET)
  - Summer (DST): UTC+02:00 (CEST)
- INSEE/Postal code: 26115 /26400
- ^{1} French Land Register data, which excludes lakes, ponds, glaciers > 1 km^{2} (0.386 sq mi or 247 acres) and river estuaries.

Divajeu (French pronunciation: [divaʒø]) is a commune in the Drôme department in southeastern France.

== Population ==
Historical population
| Year | Pop. | ±% p.a. |
|---|---|---|
| 1968 | 313 | — |
| 1975 | 341 | +1.23% |
| 1982 | 354 | +0.54% |
| 1990 | 400 | +1.54% |
| 1999 | 544 | +3.48% |
| 2007 | 578 | +0.76% |
| 2012 | 603 | +0.85% |
| 2017 | 640 | +1.20% |
| 2023 | 688 | +1.21% |
Source: INSEE

== See also ==
- Communes of the Drôme department
