= Ourches =

- Commune
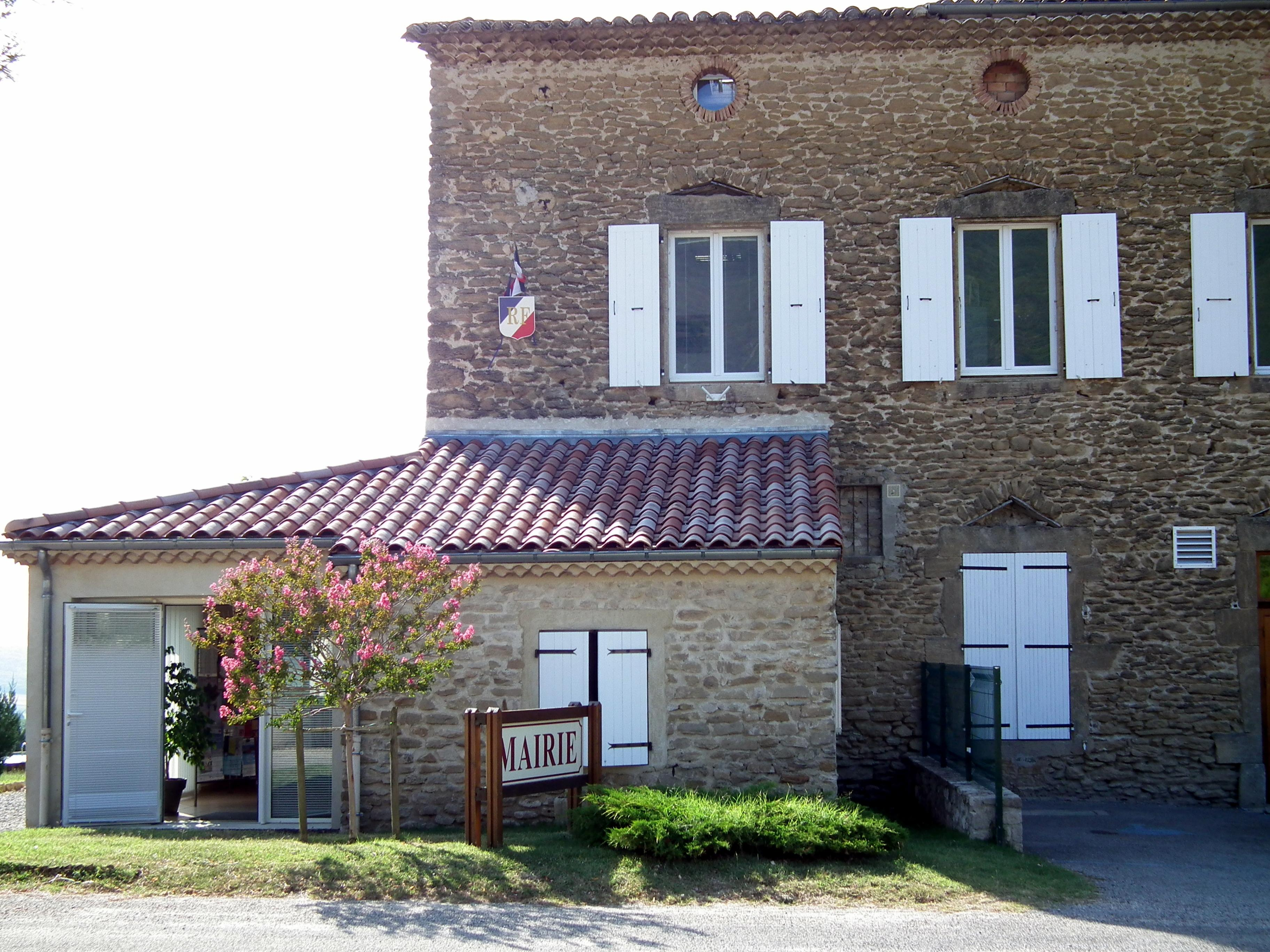
- Town hall
- Location of Ourches
- Location within France Location within Auvergne-Rhône-Alpes
- Coordinates: 44°48′20″N 5°02′31″E
- Country: France
- Region: Auvergne-Rhône-Alpes
- Department: Drôme
- Arrondissement: Valence
- Canton: Crest
- Intercommunality: CA Valence Romans Agglo

Government
  - Mayor (2020–2026): Stéphane Cousin
- Area^{1}: 9.23 km^{2} (3.56 sq mi)
- Highest elevation: 1,000 m (3,300 ft)
- Lowest elevation: 240 m (790 ft)
- Population (2023): 291
  - Density: 31.5/km^{2} (81.7/sq mi)
- Time zone: UTC+01:00 (CET)
  - Summer (DST): UTC+02:00 (CEST)
- INSEE/Postal code: 26224 /26120
- ^{1} French Land Register data, which excludes lakes, ponds, glaciers > 1 km^{2} (0.386 sq mi or 247 acres) and river estuaries.

Ourches (French pronunciation: [uʁʃ]; Occitan: Orcha) is a commune in the Drôme department in southeastern France.

== Population ==
Historical population
Year	Pop.	±% p.a.
1968	103	—
1975	92	−1.60%
1982	73	−3.25%
1990	145	+8.96%
1999	215	+4.47%
2007	208	−0.41%
2012	227	+1.76%
2017	251	+2.03%
2023	291	+2.50%
Source: INSEE

== See also ==
- Communes of the Drôme department
