= Piégros-la-Clastre =

- Commune
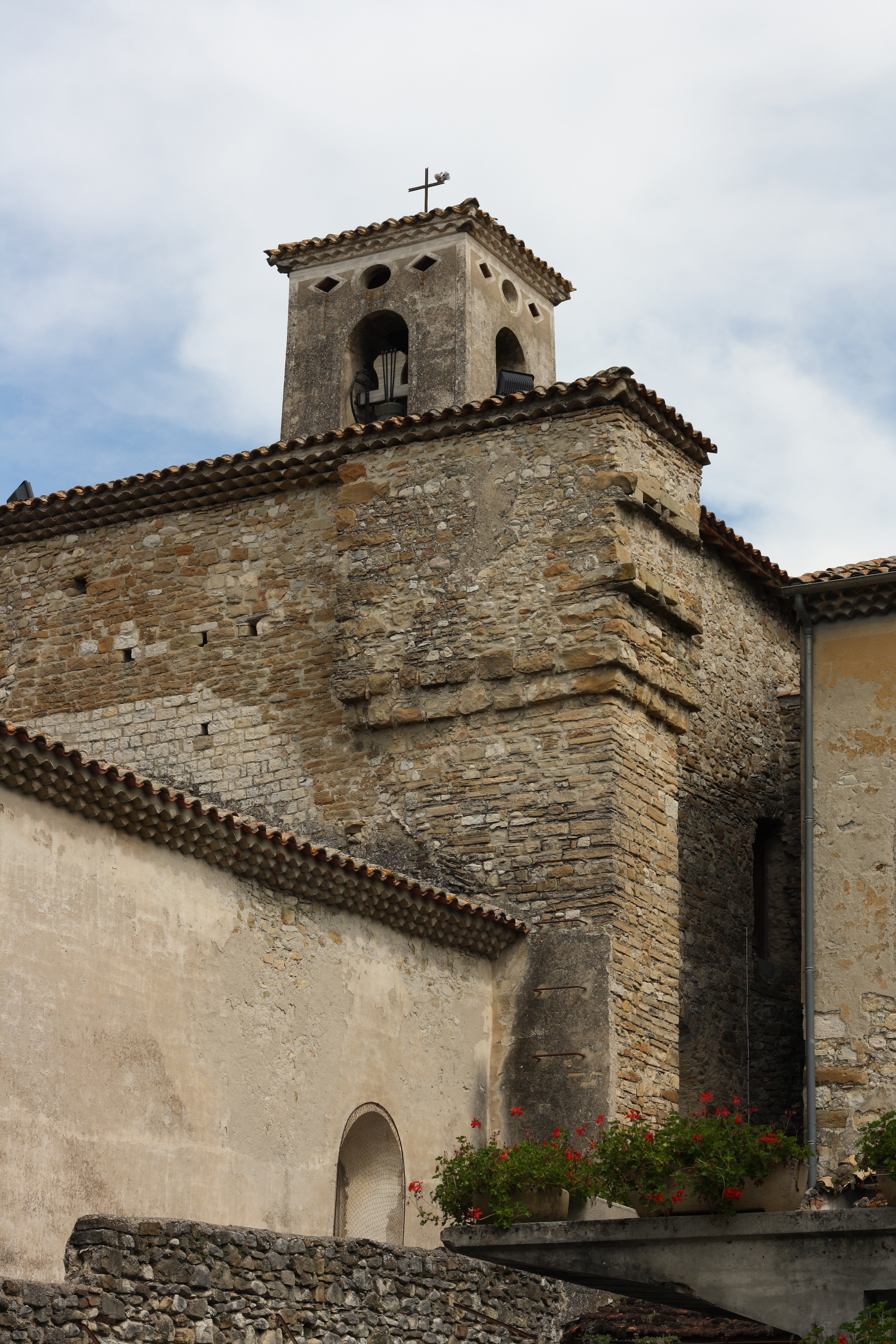
- The church of Notre-Dame in Piégros-la-Clastre
- Location of Piégros-la-Clastre
- Location within France Location within Auvergne-Rhône-Alpes
- Coordinates: 44°42′00″N 5°05′55″E
- Country: France
- Region: Auvergne-Rhône-Alpes
- Department: Drôme
- Arrondissement: Die
- Canton: Crest
- Intercommunality: Crestois et Pays de Saillans Cœur de Drôme

Government
  - Mayor (2020–2026): Gilles Magnon
- Area^{1}: 24.76 km^{2} (9.56 sq mi)
- Highest elevation: 962 m (3,156 ft)
- Lowest elevation: 198 m (650 ft)
- Population (2023): 882
  - Density: 35.6/km^{2} (92.3/sq mi)
- Time zone: UTC+01:00 (CET)
  - Summer (DST): UTC+02:00 (CEST)
- INSEE/Postal code: 26234 /26400
- ^{1} French Land Register data, which excludes lakes, ponds, glaciers > 1 km^{2} (0.386 sq mi or 247 acres) and river estuaries.

Piégros-la-Clastre (French pronunciation: [pjeɡʁo la klastʁ]; Piegròs e la Clastra) is a commune in the Drôme department in southeastern France.

== Population ==
Historical population
Year	Pop.	±% p.a.
1968	513	—
1975	492	−0.60%
1982	571	+2.15%
1990	662	+1.87%
1999	755	+1.47%
2007	865	+1.71%
2012	840	−0.58%
2017	843	+0.07%
2023	882	+0.76%
Source: INSEE

== See also ==
- Communes of the Drôme department
