= Bellegarde-en-Diois =

- Commune
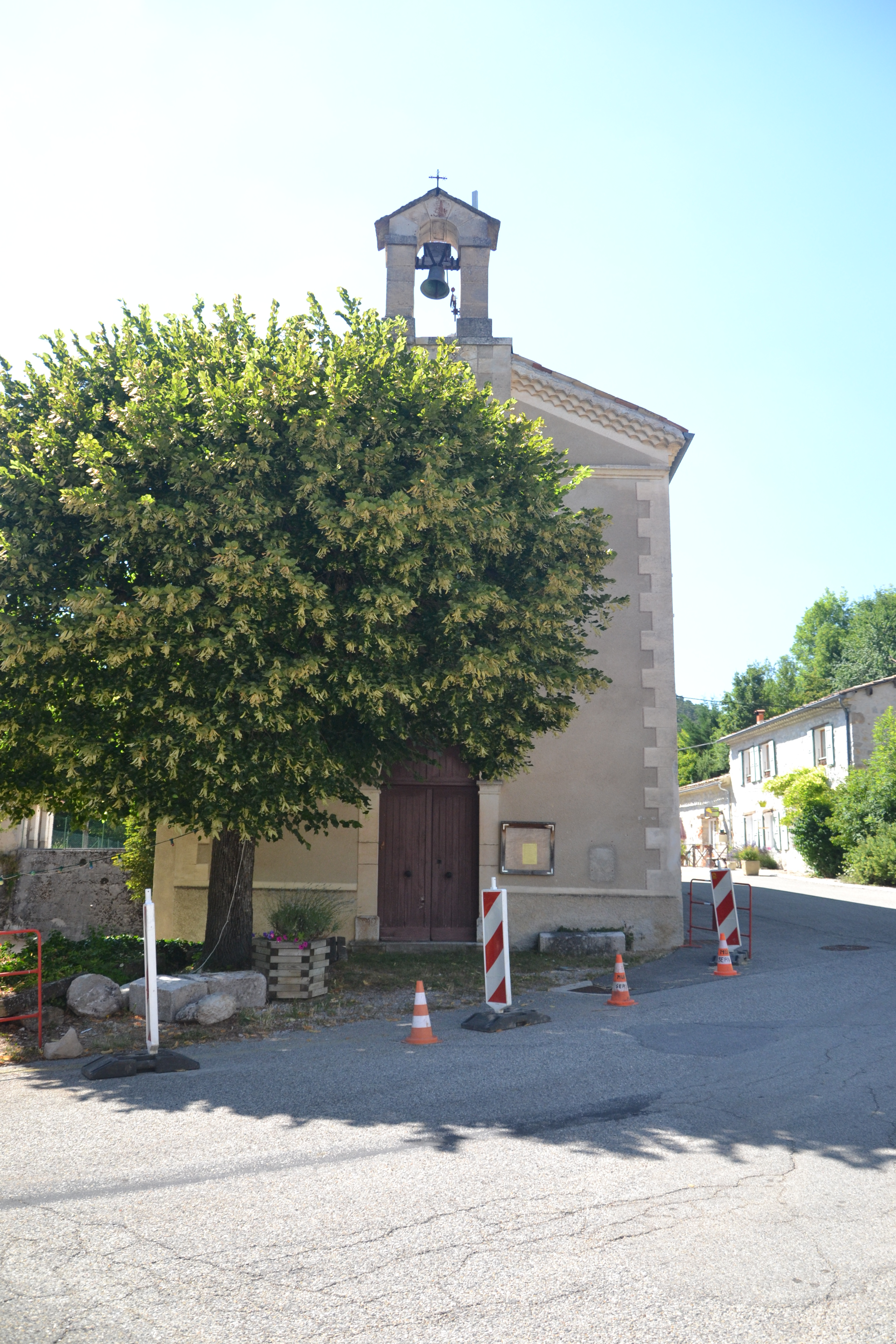
- The church in Bellegarde-en-Diois
- Location of Bellegarde-en-Diois
- Location within France Location within Auvergne-Rhône-Alpes
- Coordinates: 44°32′21″N 5°25′42″E
- Country: France
- Region: Auvergne-Rhône-Alpes
- Department: Drôme
- Arrondissement: Die
- Canton: Le Diois
- Intercommunality: Diois

Government
  - Mayor (2020–2026): Pascal Baudin
- Area^{1}: 26.04 km^{2} (10.05 sq mi)
- Highest elevation: 1,406 m (4,613 ft)
- Lowest elevation: 797 m (2,615 ft)
- Population (2023): 96
  - Density: 3.7/km^{2} (9.5/sq mi)
- Time zone: UTC+01:00 (CET)
  - Summer (DST): UTC+02:00 (CEST)
- INSEE/Postal code: 26047 /26470
- ^{1} French Land Register data, which excludes lakes, ponds, glaciers > 1 km^{2} (0.386 sq mi or 247 acres) and river estuaries.

Bellegarde-en-Diois (French pronunciation: [bɛlɡaʁd ɑ̃ diwa]; Vivaro-Alpine: Bèlagarda de Diés) is a commune in the Drôme department in southeastern France.

== Population ==
Historical population
| Year | Pop. | ±% p.a. |
|---|---|---|
| 1968 | 73 | — |
| 1975 | 61 | −2.53% |
| 1982 | 77 | +3.38% |
| 1990 | 73 | −0.66% |
| 1999 | 63 | −1.62% |
| 2007 | 75 | +2.20% |
| 2012 | 74 | −0.27% |
| 2017 | 85 | +2.81% |
| 2023 | 96 | +2.05% |
Source: INSEE

== See also ==
- Communes of the Drôme department
