= Suze, Drôme =

Suze
- Commune
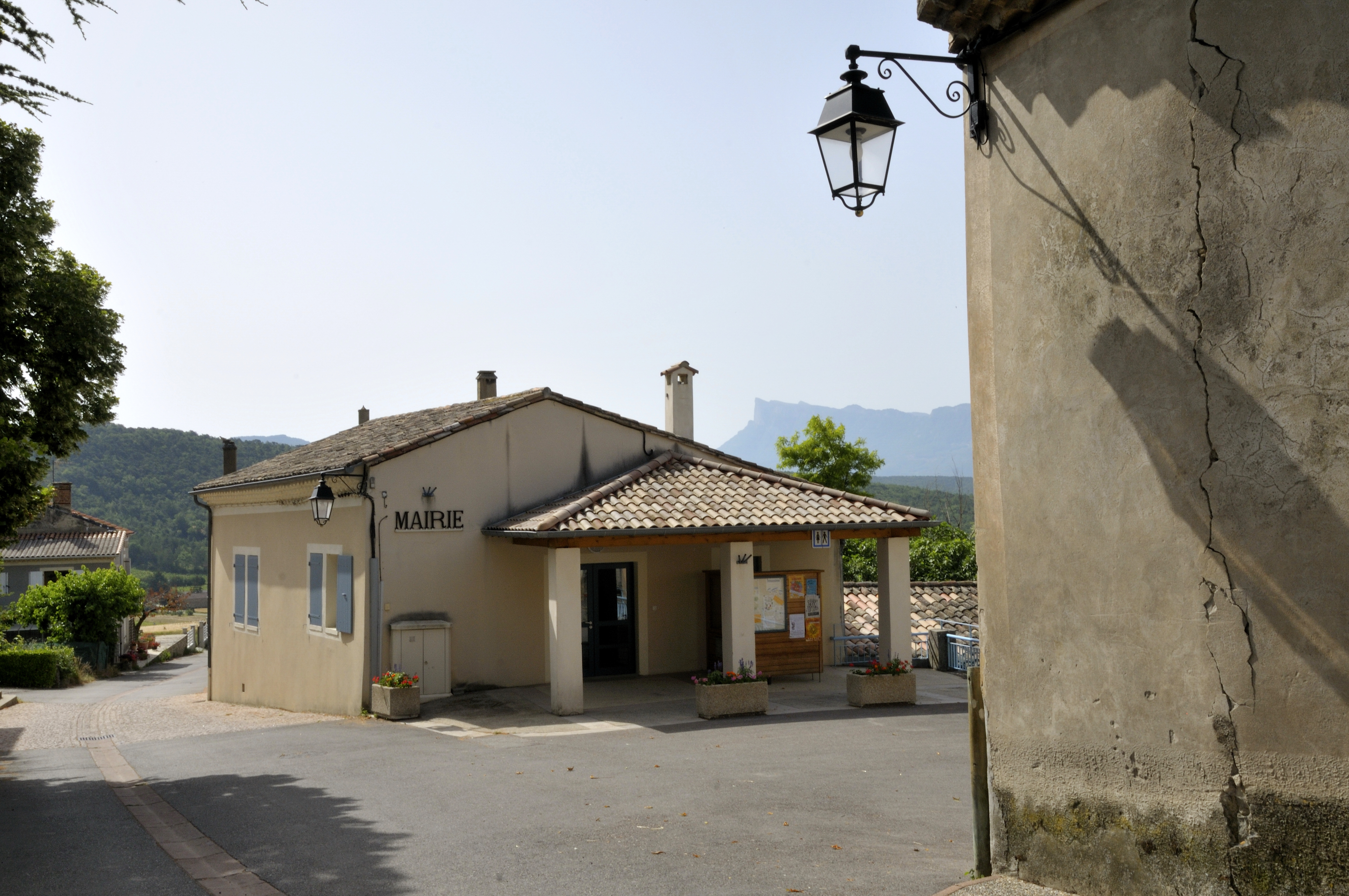
- The town hall in Suze
- Location of Suze
- Location within France Location within Auvergne-Rhône-Alpes
- Coordinates: 44°45′37″N 5°06′48″E
- Country: France
- Region: Auvergne-Rhône-Alpes
- Department: Drôme
- Arrondissement: Die
- Canton: Crest
- Intercommunality: Val de Drôme en Biovallée

Government
  - Mayor (2021–2026): Bérangère Driay
- Area^{1}: 14.43 km^{2} (5.57 sq mi)
- Highest elevation: 730 m (2,400 ft)
- Lowest elevation: 239 m (784 ft)
- Population (2023): 245
  - Density: 17.0/km^{2} (44.0/sq mi)
- Time zone: UTC+01:00 (CET)
  - Summer (DST): UTC+02:00 (CEST)
- INSEE/Postal code: 26346 /26400
- ^{1} French Land Register data, which excludes lakes, ponds, glaciers > 1 km^{2} (0.386 sq mi or 247 acres) and river estuaries.

Suze (French pronunciation: [syz]; Occitan: Susa) is a commune in the Drôme department in southeastern France in the foothills of the Alps, its buildings are in a steeply-sloped village above a small tributary feeding into the Drôme which runs from the east into the Rhône.

== Population ==
Historical population
Year	Pop.	±% p.a.
1968	223	—
1975	177	−3.25%
1982	187	+0.79%
1990	164	−1.63%
1999	226	+3.63%
2007	253	+1.42%
2012	228	−2.06%
2017	234	+0.52%
2023	245	+0.77%
Source: INSEE

== Landmarks ==
The village has a cross to Saint Pancras and has a medieval Roman Catholic church.

== Geographic context ==
Suze is centred 12 kilometres (7.5 mi) northeast of Crest, the main population and the administrative centre of the canton. Gigors-et-Lozeron, Beaufort-sur-Gervanne, Cobonne, Aouste-sur-Sye, Mirabel-et-Blacons and Montclar-sur-Gervanne border Suze.

== Etymology/topology ==
The name is a corruption of segusia, 'forceful', given to various elevated strongholds, made up of the components sego meaning 'force or vigour', and a suffix -us(e/a/ia). The same etymology describes Suze-la-Rousse to the south in Drôme and in Piedmont, Italy: Susa, which has a French name, Suse.

== Personalities ==
- Peter II, Count of Savoy was born in Suze in 1203.

== See also ==
- Communes of the Drôme department
