= Upie =

- Commune
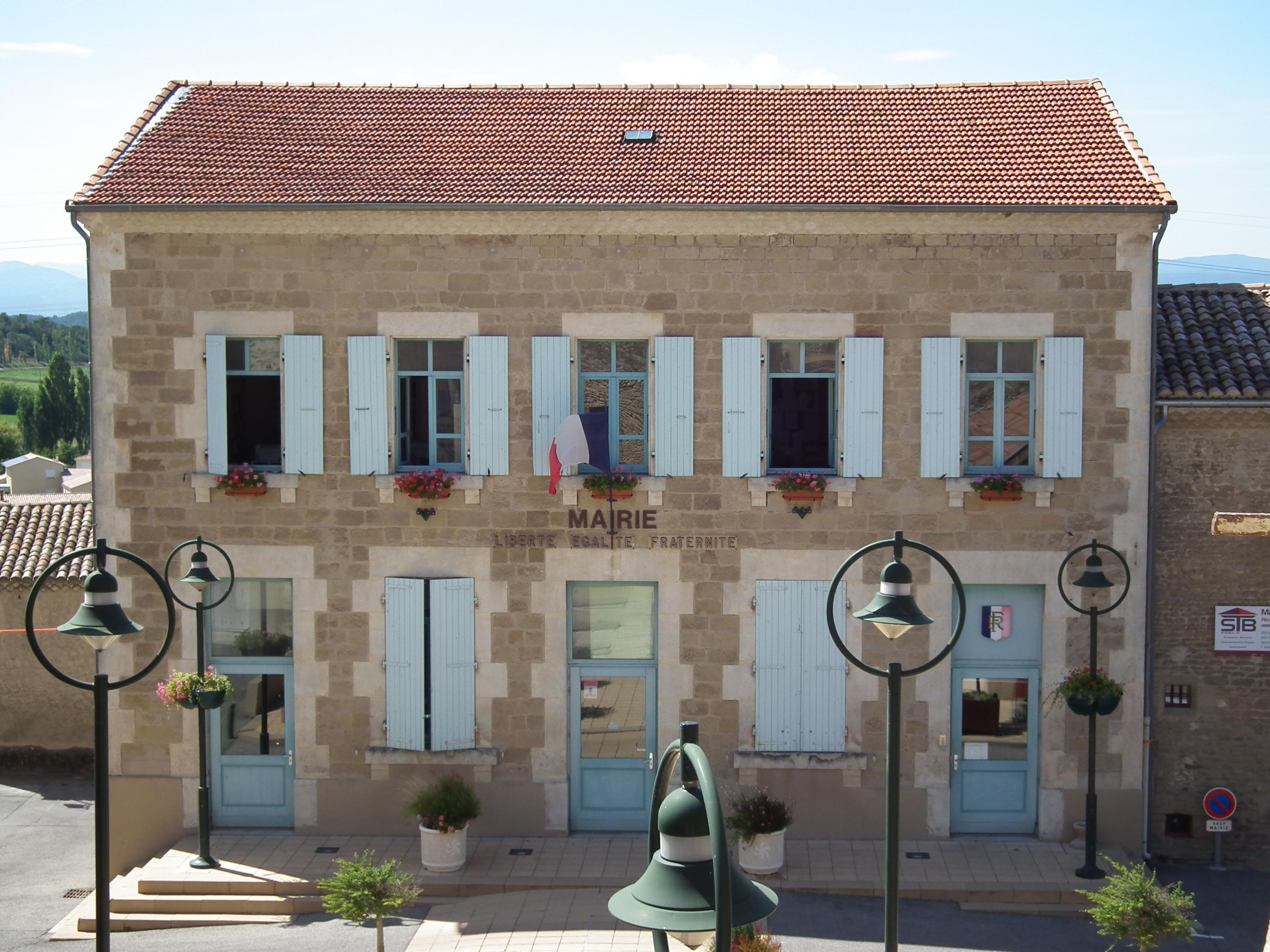
- Town hall

- Coat of arms
- Location of Upie
- Location within France Location within Auvergne-Rhône-Alpes
- Coordinates: 44°48′18″N 4°58′44″E
- Country: France
- Region: Auvergne-Rhône-Alpes
- Department: Drôme
- Arrondissement: Valence
- Canton: Crest
- Intercommunality: CA Valence Romans Agglo

Government
  - Mayor (2020–2026): Jean-Jacques Bruschini
- Area^{1}: 19.53 km^{2} (7.54 sq mi)
- Elevation: 221 m (725 ft)
- Highest elevation: 415 m (1,362 ft)
- Lowest elevation: 158 m (518 ft)
- Population (2023): 1,556
  - Density: 79.67/km^{2} (206.4/sq mi)
- Time zone: UTC+01:00 (CET)
  - Summer (DST): UTC+02:00 (CEST)
- INSEE/Postal code: 26358 /26120
- ^{1} French Land Register data, which excludes lakes, ponds, glaciers > 1 km^{2} (0.386 sq mi or 247 acres) and river estuaries.

Upie (French pronunciation: [ypi]) is a commune in the Drôme department in southeastern France.

== Population ==
Historical population
Year	Pop.	±% p.a.
1968	718	—
1975	742	+0.47%
1982	938	+3.41%
1990	956	+0.24%
1999	1,096	+1.53%
2007	1,347	+2.61%
2012	1,535	+2.65%
2017	1,520	−0.20%
2023	1,556	+0.39%
Source: INSEE

== See also ==
- Communes of the Drôme department
