= Recoubeau-Jansac =

- Commune
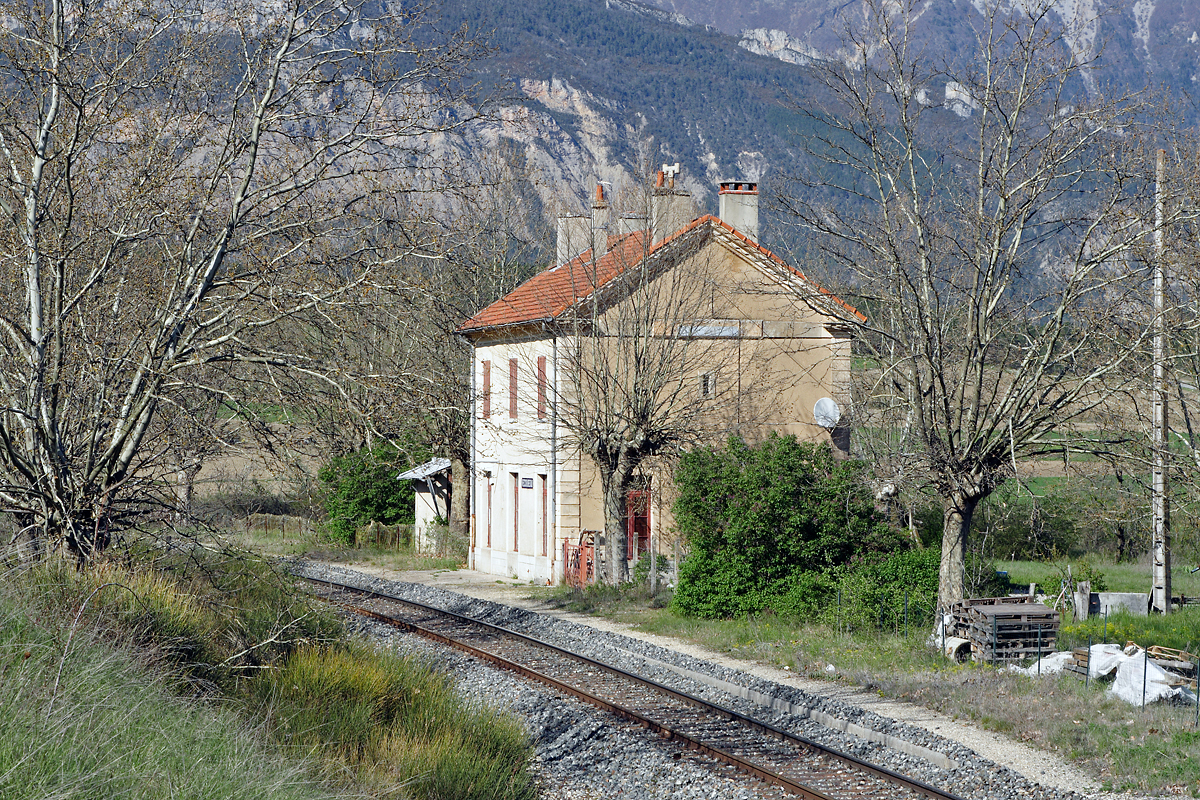
- The old railway station
- Location of Recoubeau-Jansac
- Location within France Location within Auvergne-Rhône-Alpes
- Coordinates: 44°39′17″N 5°24′49″E
- Country: France
- Region: Auvergne-Rhône-Alpes
- Department: Drôme
- Arrondissement: Die
- Canton: Le Diois
- Intercommunality: Diois

Government
  - Mayor (2020–2026): Jean-Pierre Rouit
- Area^{1}: 12.96 km^{2} (5.00 sq mi)
- Elevation: 500 m (1,600 ft)
- Highest elevation: 1,297 m (4,255 ft)
- Lowest elevation: 474 m (1,555 ft)
- Population (2023): 330
  - Density: 25/km^{2} (66/sq mi)
- Time zone: UTC+01:00 (CET)
  - Summer (DST): UTC+02:00 (CEST)
- INSEE/Postal code: 26262 /26310
- ^{1} French Land Register data, which excludes lakes, ponds, glaciers > 1 km^{2} (0.386 sq mi or 247 acres) and river estuaries.

Recoubeau-Jansac (French pronunciation: [ʁəkubo ʒɑ̃sak]; Occitan: Recobèu e Gençac) is a commune in the Drôme department in southeastern France, it is 15 km south of the town Die and is located in the arrondissement with same name.

== Population ==
Historical population
Year	Pop.	±% p.a.
1968	225	—
1975	203	−1.46%
1982	208	+0.35%
1990	197	−0.68%
1999	207	+0.55%
2007	231	+1.38%
2012	260	+2.39%
2017	269	+0.68%
2023	330	+3.47%
Source: INSEE

== See also ==
- Communes of the Drôme department
