= Col de Palaquit =

Mountain pass in France

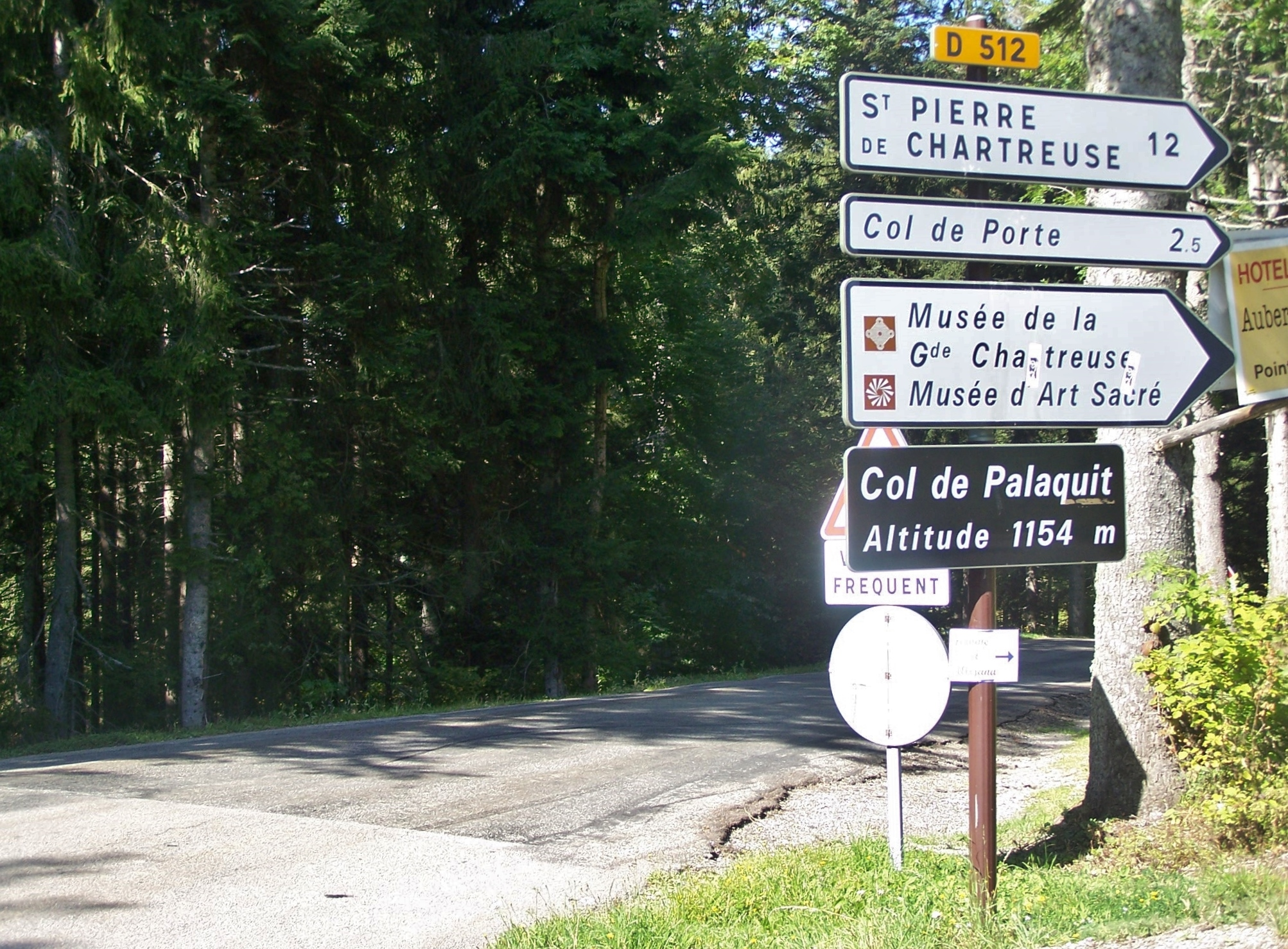
- Road signs at the summit

- Location within Alps
- Elevation: 1,154 metres (3,786 ft)
- Traversed by: D57

Third Approach
- Location: Isère, Rhône-Alpes, France
- Range: Chartreuse Mountains
- Coordinates: 45°16′22″N 5°45′56″E

The Col de Palaquit (altitude 1,154 m (3,786 ft)) is a mountain pass situated in the Chartreuse Mountains in the Isère department of France, near the village of Sarcenas. The Tour de France cycle race crossed the col for the first time on Stage 13 of the 2014 race. The pass is located on the climb via the D512 from Grenoble to the Col de Porte which has been used regularly by the Tour de France.

== Cycle racing ==
=== Details of climb ===
From Saint-Égrève, to the south-west, the climb travels via the D105 to the village of Quaix-en-Chartreuse before dropping down again to join the D57. Over the entire distance of 16.2 km (10.1 mi), the climb gains 931 m (3,054 ft) in altitude, at an average gradient of 5.7%. The 2014 Tour de France climb commences on the outskirts of Saint-Egrève and is thus shorter, at 14.1 km (8.8 mi), gaining 859 m (2,818 ft) in altitude, at an average gradient of 6.1%.

After leaving Saint-Égrève, the climb has sections in excess of 10% before a descent after Quaix-en-Chartreuse. The final section has several hairpins separated by 12% ramps. Overall, the climb has in excess of 1,000 m (3,300 ft) of climbing.

The col can also be accessed direct from Grenoble via Le Sappey-en-Chartreuse, using the D512. This climb is 14.8 km (9.2 mi) long, gaining 939 m (3,081 ft) in altitude, at an average gradient of 6.3%.

=== Tour de France ===
On 18 July 2014, the Tour de France cycle race crossed the col for the first time en route from Saint-Étienne to Chamrousse. The leader over the summit was the Italian, Alessandro De Marchi. On the descent, Jakob Fuglsang crashed, putting him out of contention for a podium place.
