= Saint-Paul-de-Varces =

- Commune
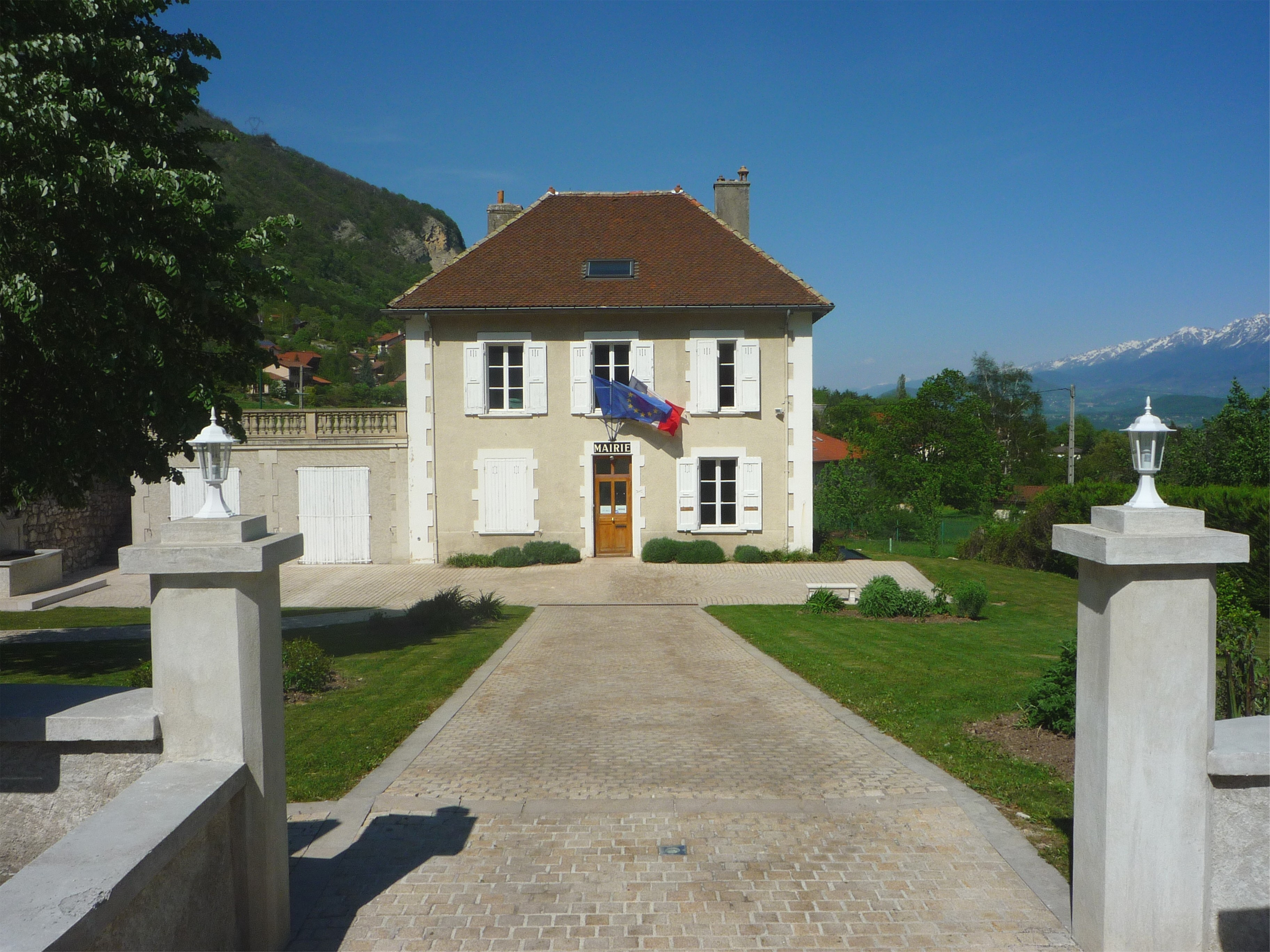
- Town hall
- Location of Saint-Paul-de-Varces
- Location within France Location within Auvergne-Rhône-Alpes
- Coordinates: 45°04′20″N 5°38′27″E
- Country: France
- Region: Auvergne-Rhône-Alpes
- Department: Isère
- Arrondissement: Grenoble
- Canton: Le Pont-de-Claix
- Intercommunality: Grenoble-Alpes Métropole

Government
  - Mayor (2024–2026): Cécile Curtet
- Area^{1}: 20 km^{2} (7.7 sq mi)
- Elevation: 388 m (1,273 ft)
- Highest elevation: 2,047 m (6,716 ft)
- Lowest elevation: 293 m (961 ft)
- Population (2023): 2,218
  - Density: 110/km^{2} (290/sq mi)
- Time zone: UTC+01:00 (CET)
  - Summer (DST): UTC+02:00 (CEST)
- INSEE/Postal code: 38436 /38760
- ^{1} French Land Register data, which excludes lakes, ponds, glaciers > 1 km^{2} (0.386 sq mi or 247 acres) and river estuaries.

Saint-Paul-de-Varces (French pronunciation: [sɛ̃ pɔl də vaʁs], literally Saint-Paul of Varces; Arpitan: Sant-Pol) is a commune in the Isère department in southeastern France.

It is located 30 km southwest of Grenoble.

== Population ==
Historical population

Year	Pop.	±% p.a.
1793	551	—
1821	747	+1.09%
1846	727	−0.11%
1872	616	−0.64%
1901	526	−0.54%
1926	404	−1.05%
1946	392	−0.15%
1962	419	+0.42%
1968	456	+1.42%

Year	Pop.	±% p.a.
1975	581	+3.52%
1982	941	+7.13%
1990	1,530	+6.26%
1999	1,845	+2.10%
2007	2,008	+1.06%
2012	2,216	+1.99%
2017	2,173	−0.39%
2023	2,218	+0.34%

Source: EHESS and INSEE (1968-2023)

== Mayors ==
Mayor	Term start	Term end	Party
Denis Bonzy	1989	1995	Rally for the Republic
Francois Diaz	1995	2014	Socialist Party
David Richard	2014	in office	Union of Democrats and Independents

== See also ==
- Communes of the Isère department
- Parc naturel régional du Vercors
