= Canton of Fontaine-Vercors =

Coordinates: 45.20°N 5.68°E

The canton of Fontaine-Vercors is an administrative division of the Isère department, eastern France. It was created at the French canton reorganisation which came into effect in March 2015. Its seat is in Fontaine.

It consists of the following communes:

1. Autrans-Méaudre-en-Vercors
2. Corrençon-en-Vercors
3. Engins
4. Fontaine (partly)
5. Lans-en-Vercors
6. Noyarey
7. Saint-Nizier-du-Moucherotte
8. Sassenage
9. Veurey-Voroize
10. Villard-de-Lans
