= Champagnier =

- Commune
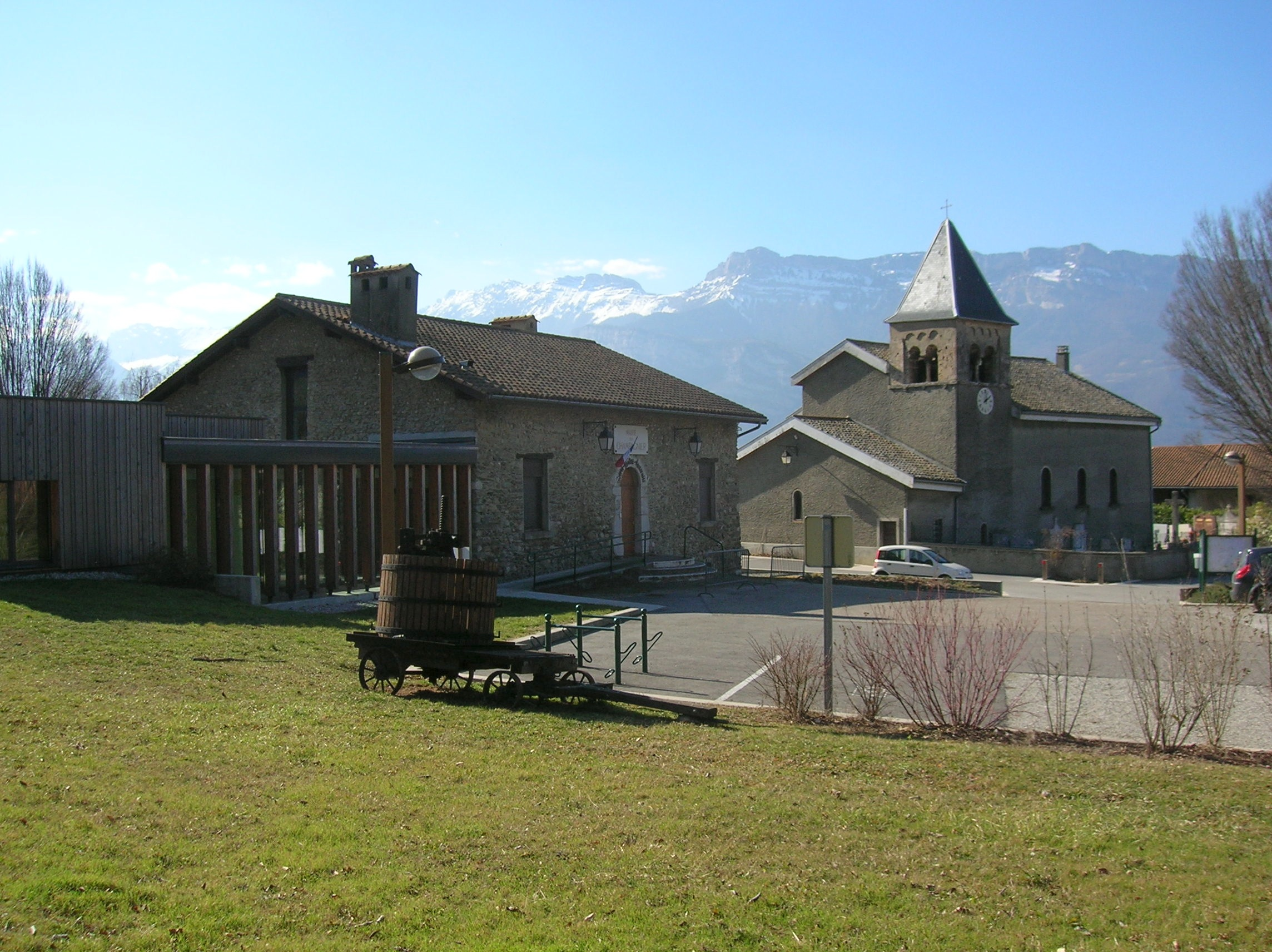
- The town hall and church of Champagnier
- Location of Champagnier
- Location within France Location within Auvergne-Rhône-Alpes
- Coordinates: 45°06′38″N 5°43′42″E
- Country: France
- Region: Auvergne-Rhône-Alpes
- Department: Isère
- Arrondissement: Grenoble
- Canton: Le Pont-de-Claix
- Intercommunality: Grenoble-Alpes Métropole

Government
  - Mayor (2020–2026): Florent Cholat
- Area^{1}: 6.61 km^{2} (2.55 sq mi)
- Highest elevation: 516 m (1,693 ft)
- Lowest elevation: 239 m (784 ft)
- Population (2023): 1,557
  - Density: 236/km^{2} (610/sq mi)
- Time zone: UTC+01:00 (CET)
  - Summer (DST): UTC+02:00 (CEST)
- INSEE/Postal code: 38068 /38800
- ^{1} French Land Register data, which excludes lakes, ponds, glaciers > 1 km^{2} (0.386 sq mi or 247 acres) and river estuaries.

Champagnier (French pronunciation: [ʃɑ̃paɲe]) is a commune in the Isère department in southeastern France.

== Population ==
Historical population
Year	Pop.	±% p.a.
1968	591	—
1975	641	+1.17%
1982	683	+0.91%
1990	902	+3.54%
1999	961	+0.71%
2007	1,142	+2.18%
2012	1,278	+2.28%
2017	1,226	−0.83%
2023	1,557	+4.06%
Source: INSEE

== See also ==
- Communes of the Isère department
