= Herbeys =

- Commune
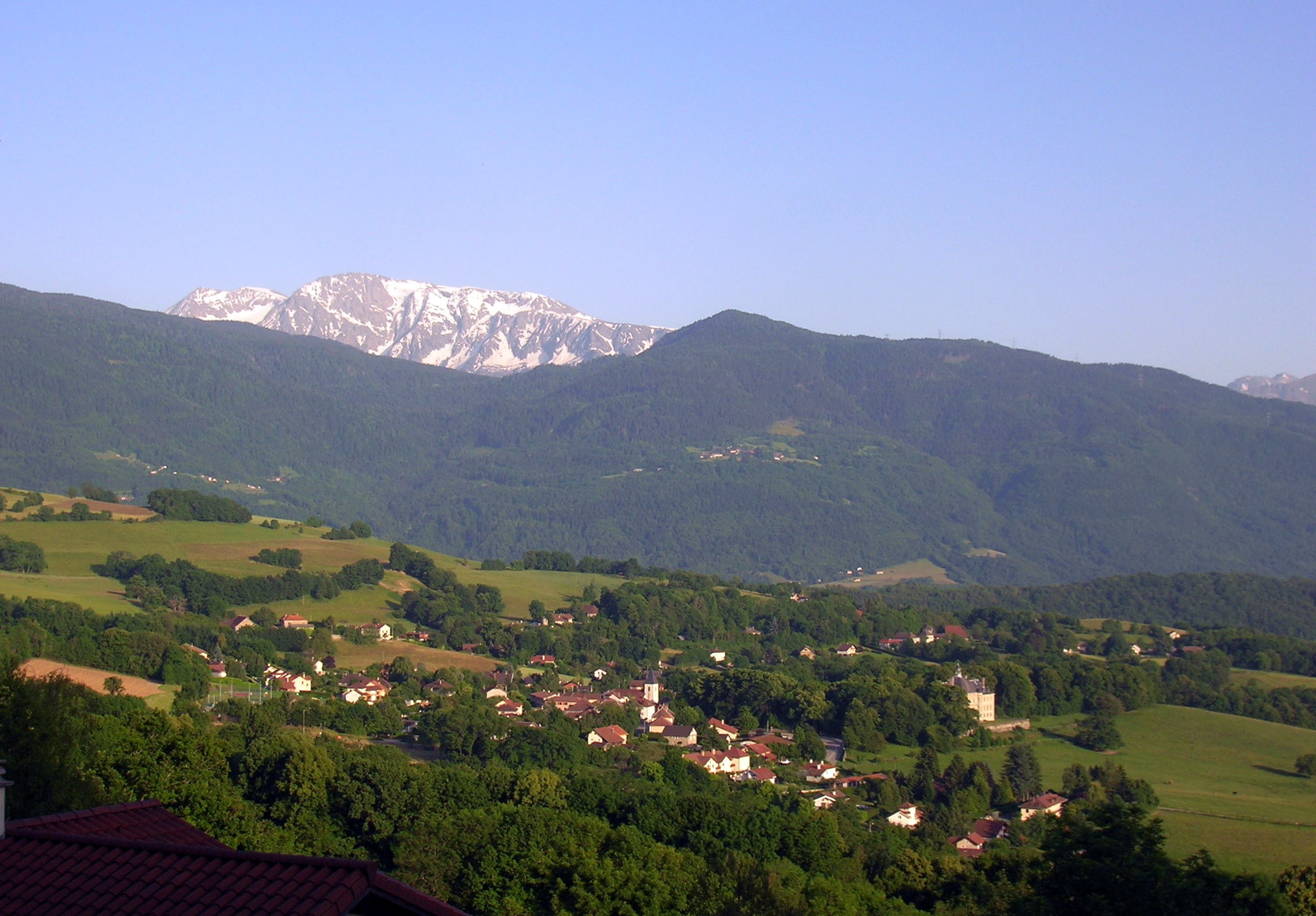
- A general view of Herbeys

- Coat of arms
- Location of Herbeys
- Location within France Location within Auvergne-Rhône-Alpes
- Coordinates: 45°08′20″N 5°47′36″E
- Country: France
- Region: Auvergne-Rhône-Alpes
- Department: Isère
- Arrondissement: Grenoble
- Canton: Le Pont-de-Claix
- Intercommunality: Grenoble-Alpes Métropole

Government
  - Mayor (2020–2026): Françoise Fontana
- Area^{1}: 7.73 km^{2} (2.98 sq mi)
- Highest elevation: 935 m (3,068 ft)
- Lowest elevation: 417 m (1,368 ft)
- Population (2023): 1,424
  - Density: 184/km^{2} (477/sq mi)
- Time zone: UTC+01:00 (CET)
  - Summer (DST): UTC+02:00 (CEST)
- INSEE/Postal code: 38188 /38320
- ^{1} French Land Register data, which excludes lakes, ponds, glaciers > 1 km^{2} (0.386 sq mi or 247 acres) and river estuaries.

Herbeys (French pronunciation: [ɛʁbɛ]; Arpitan: Hèrbês) is a commune in the Isère department in southeastern France.

== Population ==
Historical population
Year	Pop.	±% p.a.
1968	355	—
1975	765	+11.59%
1982	945	+3.06%
1990	1,086	+1.75%
1999	1,167	+0.80%
2007	1,287	+1.23%
2012	1,352	+0.99%
2017	1,361	+0.13%
2023	1,424	+0.76%
Source: INSEE

== See also ==
- Communes of the Isère department
- Château d'Herbeys
