= Jarrie =

- Commune
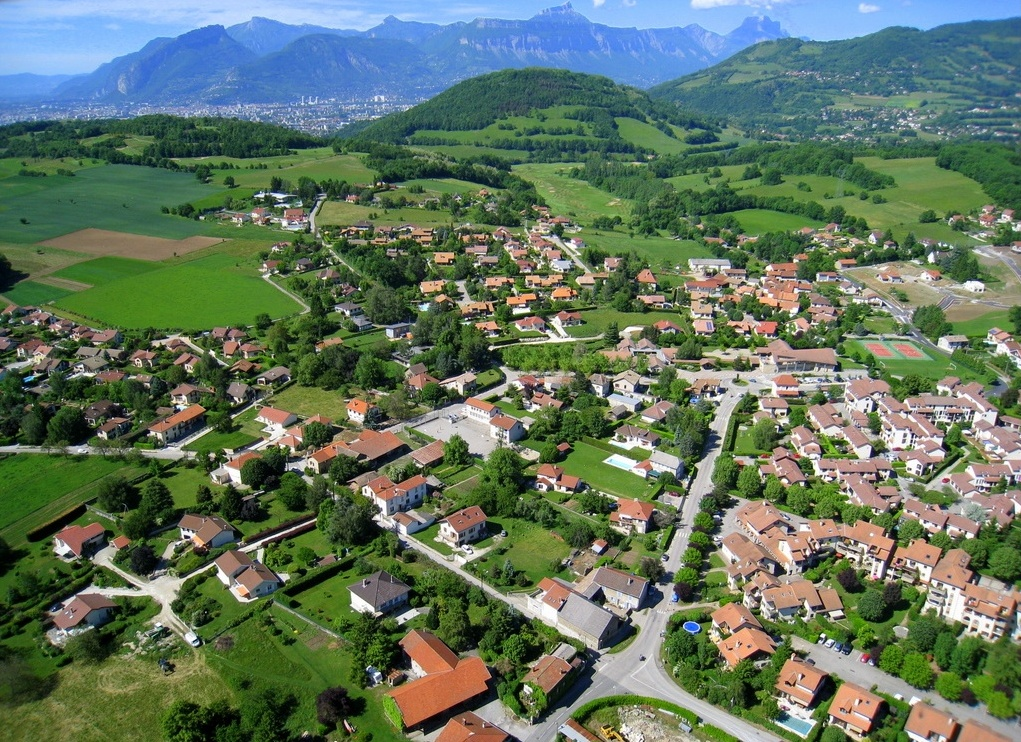
- A general view of Jarrie

- Coat of arms
- Location of Jarrie
- Location within France Location within Auvergne-Rhône-Alpes
- Coordinates: 45°06′43″N 5°45′39″E
- Country: France
- Region: Auvergne-Rhône-Alpes
- Department: Isère
- Arrondissement: Grenoble
- Canton: Le Pont-de-Claix
- Intercommunality: Grenoble-Alpes Métropole

Government
  - Mayor (2020–2026): Raphaël Guerrero
- Area^{1}: 13.26 km^{2} (5.12 sq mi)
- Highest elevation: 733 m (2,405 ft)
- Lowest elevation: 259 m (850 ft)
- Population (2023): 3,952
  - Density: 298.0/km^{2} (771.9/sq mi)
- Time zone: UTC+01:00 (CET)
  - Summer (DST): UTC+02:00 (CEST)
- INSEE/Postal code: 38200 /38560
- ^{1} French Land Register data, which excludes lakes, ponds, glaciers > 1 km^{2} (0.386 sq mi or 247 acres) and river estuaries.

Jarrie (French pronunciation: [ʒaʁˈi]) is a commune in the Isère department in southeastern France. It is part of the Grenoble urban unit (agglomeration). The nearby Domaine de Vizille, home to the Museum of the French Revolution, is a key cultural attraction.

== Population ==
Historical population

Year	Pop.	±% p.a.
1793	839	—
1800	675	−3.06%
1806	963	+6.10%
1821	1,030	+0.45%
1831	1,104	+0.70%
1836	1,095	−0.16%
1841	1,067	−0.52%
1846	996	−1.37%
1851	971	−0.51%
1856	979	+0.16%
1861	935	−0.92%
1866	926	−0.19%
1872	898	−0.51%
1876	917	+0.52%
1881	967	+1.07%
1886	989	+0.45%
1891	991	+0.04%
1896	955	−0.74%
1901	962	+0.15%

Year	Pop.	±% p.a.
1906	974	+0.25%
1911	1,020	+0.93%
1921	1,176	+1.43%
1926	1,320	+2.34%
1931	1,438	+1.73%
1936	1,503	+0.89%
1946	1,523	+0.13%
1954	1,904	+2.83%
1962	2,167	+1.63%
1968	2,084	−0.65%
1975	2,009	−0.52%
1982	2,807	+4.89%
1990	3,809	+3.89%
1999	4,009	+0.57%
2007	3,847	−0.51%
2012	3,823	−0.13%
2017	3,746	−0.41%
2023	3,952	+0.90%

Source: EHESS and INSEE (1968-2023)

== Twin towns ==
Jarrie is twinned with:

- Macael, Spain, since 1989

== See also ==
- Communes of the Isère department
