= Brié-et-Angonnes =

- Commune
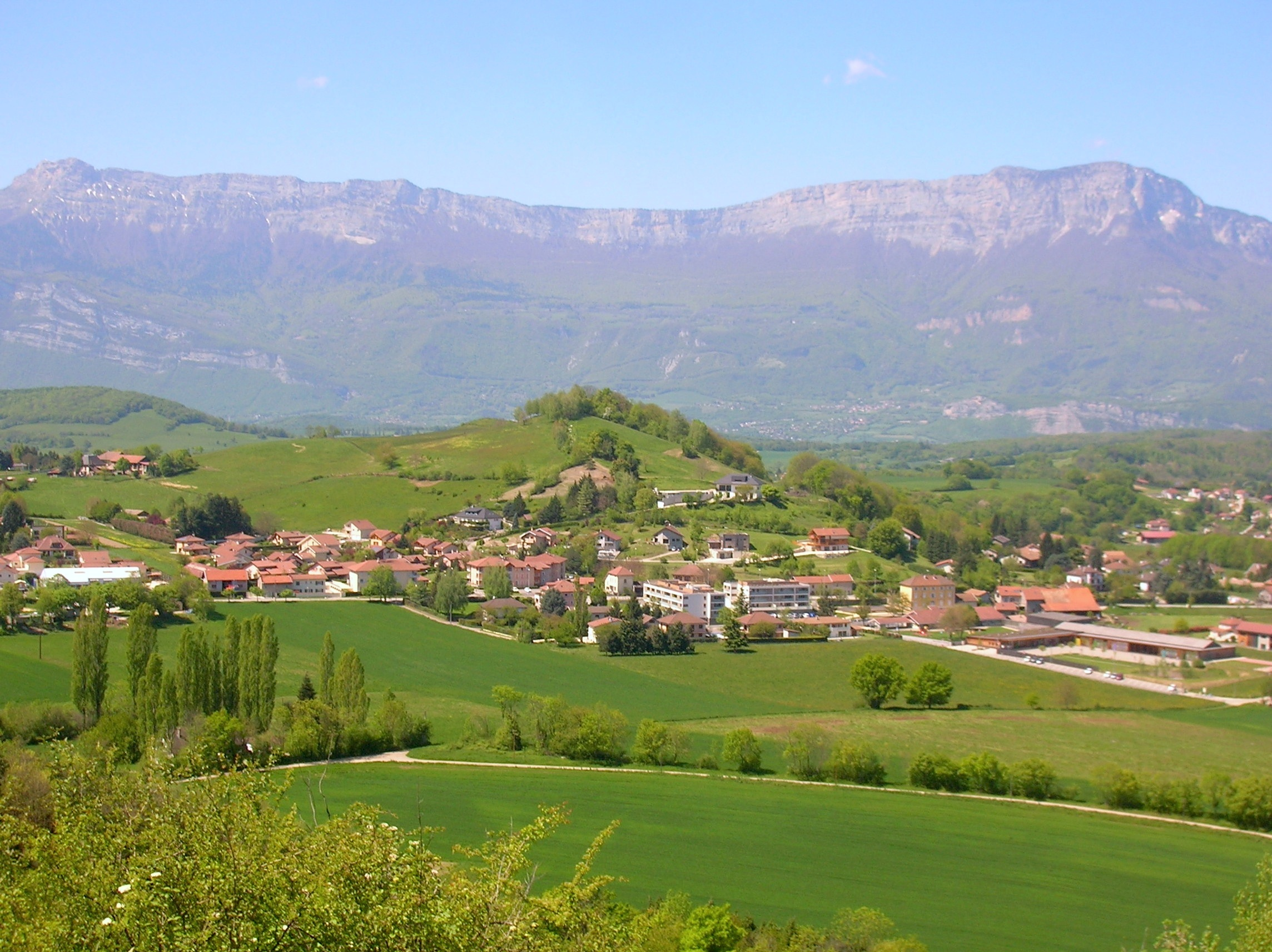
- A general view of Brié

- Coat of arms
- Location of Brié-et-Angonnes
- Location within France Location within Auvergne-Rhône-Alpes
- Coordinates: 45°07′12″N 5°48′00″E
- Country: France
- Region: Auvergne-Rhône-Alpes
- Department: Isère
- Arrondissement: Grenoble
- Canton: Le Pont-de-Claix
- Intercommunality: Grenoble-Alpes Métropole

Government
  - Mayor (2020–2026): Claude Soullier
- Area^{1}: 9.70 km^{2} (3.75 sq mi)
- Highest elevation: 737 m (2,418 ft)
- Lowest elevation: 306 m (1,004 ft)
- Population (2023): 2,497
  - Density: 257/km^{2} (667/sq mi)
- Demonym: Briataux
- Time zone: UTC+01:00 (CET)
  - Summer (DST): UTC+02:00 (CEST)
- INSEE/Postal code: 38059 /38320
- ^{1} French Land Register data, which excludes lakes, ponds, glaciers > 1 km^{2} (0.386 sq mi or 247 acres) and river estuaries.

Brié-et-Angonnes (French pronunciation: [bʁije e ɑ̃ɡɔn]; Arpitan: Briés-et-Engonos) is a commune in the Isère department in southeastern France.

== Population ==
Historical population

Year	Pop.	±% p.a.
1793	508	—
1800	535	+0.74%
1806	553	+0.55%
1821	624	+0.81%
1831	650	+0.41%
1836	663	+0.40%
1841	642	−0.64%
1846	655	+0.40%
1851	606	−1.54%
1856	568	−1.29%
1861	614	+1.57%
1866	563	−1.72%
1872	575	+0.35%
1876	619	+1.86%
1881	569	−1.67%
1886	546	−0.82%
1891	524	−0.82%
1896	571	+1.73%
1901	539	−1.15%

Year	Pop.	±% p.a.
1906	514	−0.95%
1911	447	−2.75%
1921	372	−1.82%
1926	381	+0.48%
1931	403	+1.13%
1936	391	−0.60%
1946	381	−0.26%
1954	441	+1.84%
1962	467	+0.72%
1968	666	+6.09%
1975	1,511	+12.42%
1982	1,617	+0.97%
1990	1,619	+0.02%
1999	1,833	+1.39%
2007	2,288	+2.81%
2012	2,482	+1.64%
2017	2,556	+0.59%
2023	2,497	−0.39%

Source: EHESS and INSEE (1968-2023)

== See also ==
- Communes of the Isère department
