= Eybens =

- Commune
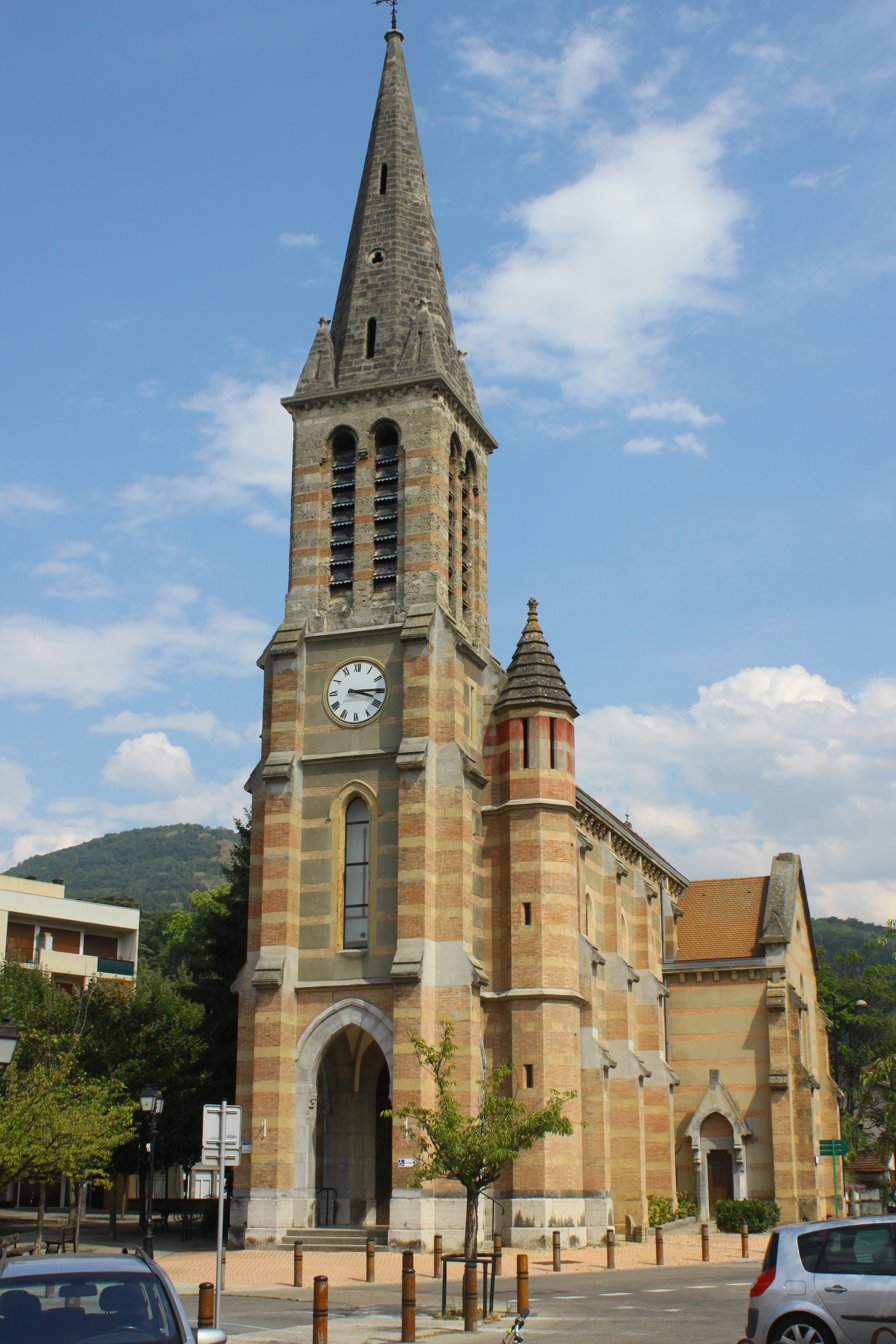
- The church of Saint-Christophe, in Eybens

- Coat of arms
- Location of Eybens
- Location within France Location within Auvergne-Rhône-Alpes
- Coordinates: 45°08′58″N 5°45′03″E
- Country: France
- Region: Auvergne-Rhône-Alpes
- Department: Isère
- Arrondissement: Grenoble
- Canton: Échirolles
- Intercommunality: Grenoble-Alpes Métropole

Government
  - Mayor (2020–2026): Nicolas Richard
- Area^{1}: 4.50 km^{2} (1.74 sq mi)
- Highest elevation: 408 m (1,339 ft)
- Lowest elevation: 216 m (709 ft)
- Population (2023): 10,493
  - Density: 2,330/km^{2} (6,040/sq mi)
- Time zone: UTC+01:00 (CET)
  - Summer (DST): UTC+02:00 (CEST)
- INSEE/Postal code: 38158 /38320
- ^{1} French Land Register data, which excludes lakes, ponds, glaciers > 1 km^{2} (0.386 sq mi or 247 acres) and river estuaries.

Eybens (French pronunciation: [ebɛ̃(s)]) is a commune in the Isère department in southeastern France. It is part of the Grenoble urban unit (agglomeration).

== Population ==
Historical population

Year	Pop.	±% p.a.
1793	526	—
1800	598	+1.85%
1806	619	+0.58%
1821	713	+0.95%
1831	866	+1.96%
1836	823	−1.01%
1841	815	−0.20%
1846	846	+0.75%
1851	810	−0.87%
1856	834	+0.59%
1861	773	−1.51%
1866	806	+0.84%
1872	819	+0.27%
1876	835	+0.48%
1881	806	−0.70%
1886	834	+0.69%
1891	822	−0.29%
1896	824	+0.05%
1901	771	−1.32%

Year	Pop.	±% p.a.
1906	801	+0.77%
1911	791	−0.25%
1921	795	+0.05%
1926	1,003	+4.76%
1931	1,295	+5.24%
1936	1,319	+0.37%
1946	1,329	+0.08%
1954	1,756	+3.54%
1962	2,346	+3.69%
1968	3,310	+5.91%
1975	5,436	+7.34%
1982	5,843	+1.04%
1990	8,013	+4.03%
1999	9,471	+1.87%
2007	9,262	−0.28%
2012	9,944	+1.43%
2017	10,185	+0.48%
2023	10,493	+0.50%

Source: EHESS and INSEE (1968-2023)
