= Notre-Dame-de-Commiers =

- Commune
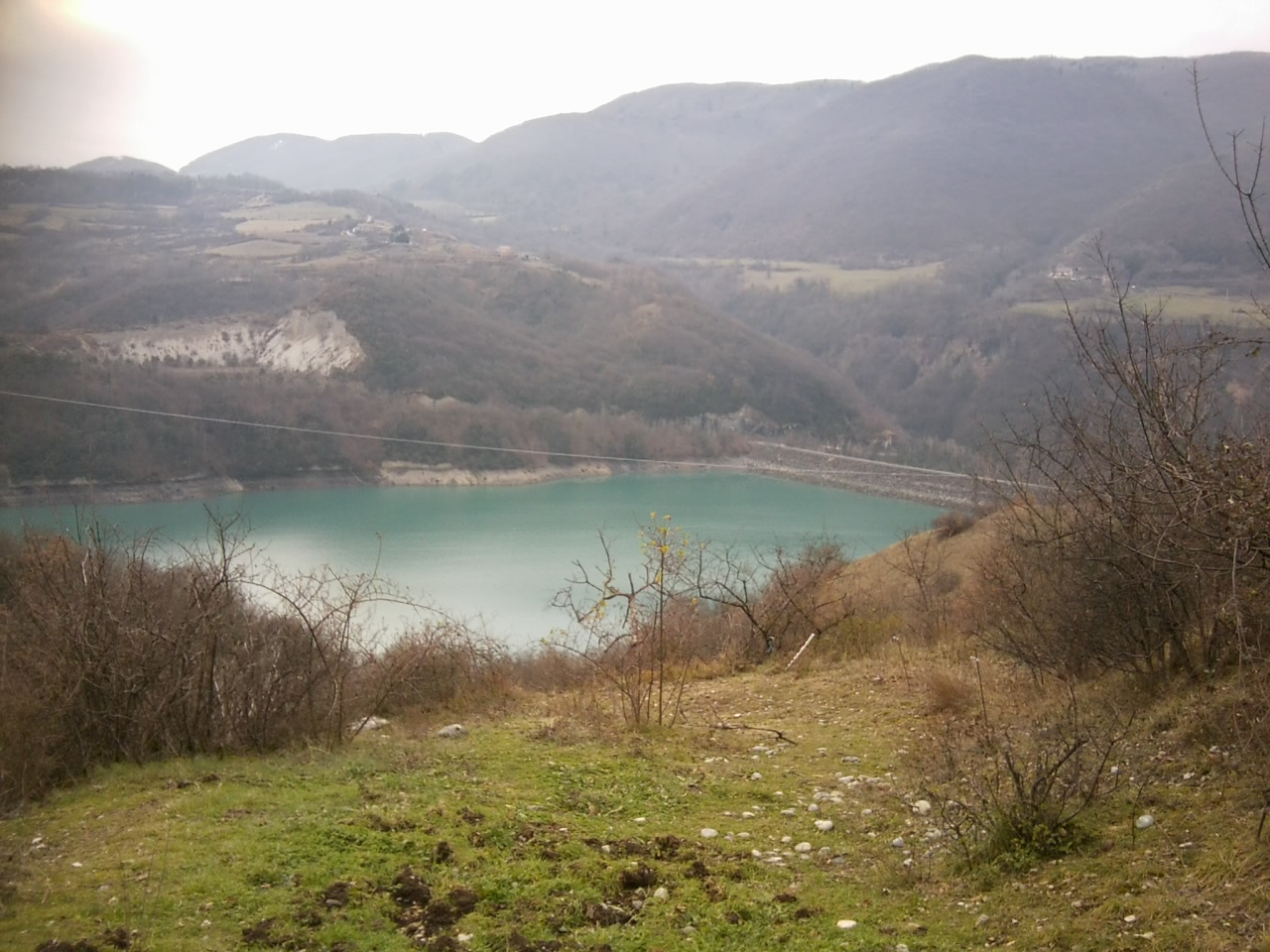
- The lake of Notre-Dame-de-Commiers

- Coat of arms
- Location of Notre-Dame-de-Commiers
- Location within France Location within Auvergne-Rhône-Alpes
- Coordinates: 45°00′35″N 5°41′59″E
- Country: France
- Region: Auvergne-Rhône-Alpes
- Department: Isère
- Arrondissement: Grenoble
- Canton: Le Pont-de-Claix
- Intercommunality: Grenoble-Alpes Métropole

Government
  - Mayor (2020–2026): Patrick Marron
- Area^{1}: 4.79 km^{2} (1.85 sq mi)
- Highest elevation: 1,323 m (4,341 ft)
- Lowest elevation: 317 m (1,040 ft)
- Population (2023): 519
  - Density: 108/km^{2} (281/sq mi)
- Time zone: UTC+01:00 (CET)
  - Summer (DST): UTC+02:00 (CEST)
- INSEE/Postal code: 38277 /38450
- ^{1} French Land Register data, which excludes lakes, ponds, glaciers > 1 km^{2} (0.386 sq mi or 247 acres) and river estuaries.

Notre-Dame-de-Commiers (French pronunciation: [nɔtʁ dˈam də kɔmjˈe]) is a commune in the Isère department in southeastern France.

== Population ==
Historical population
Year	Pop.	±% p.a.
1968	118	—
1975	185	+6.63%
1982	216	+2.24%
1990	302	+4.28%
1999	377	+2.50%
2007	463	+2.60%
2012	460	−0.13%
2017	518	+2.40%
2023	519	+0.03%
Source: INSEE

== See also ==
- Communes of the Isère department
