= Veurey-Voroize =

- Commune
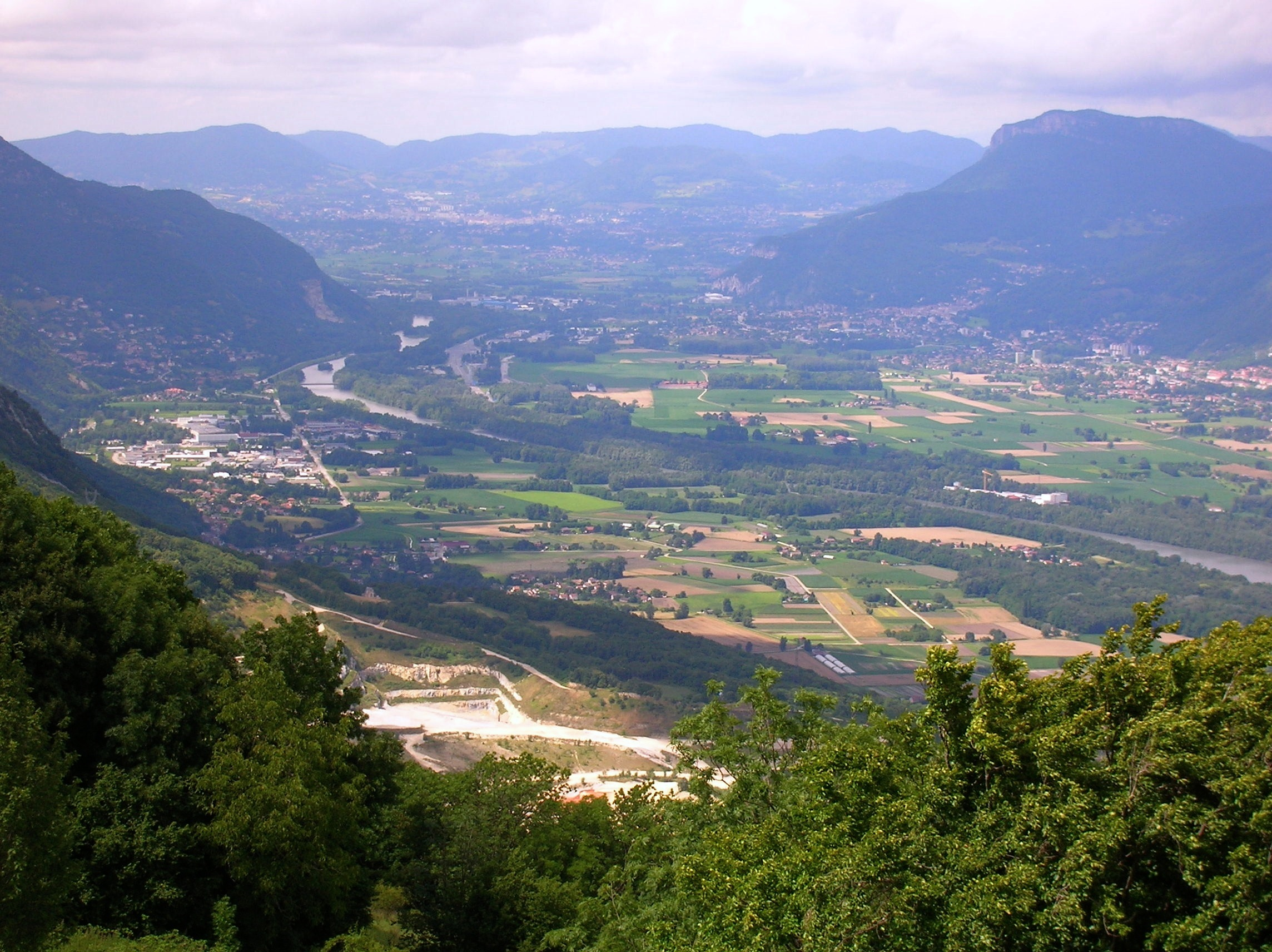
- A general view of Veurey-Voroize
- Location of Veurey-Voroize
- Location within France Location within Auvergne-Rhône-Alpes
- Coordinates: 45°16′19″N 5°36′58″E
- Country: France
- Region: Auvergne-Rhône-Alpes
- Department: Isère
- Arrondissement: Grenoble
- Canton: Fontaine-Vercors
- Intercommunality: Grenoble-Alpes Métropole

Government
  - Mayor (2020–2026): Pascale Rigault
- Area^{1}: 12.21 km^{2} (4.71 sq mi)
- Elevation: 198 m (650 ft)
- Highest elevation: 1,620 m (5,310 ft)
- Lowest elevation: 178 m (584 ft)
- Population (2023): 1,427
  - Density: 116.9/km^{2} (302.7/sq mi)
- Time zone: UTC+01:00 (CET)
  - Summer (DST): UTC+02:00 (CEST)
- INSEE/Postal code: 38540 /38113
- ^{1} French Land Register data, which excludes lakes, ponds, glaciers > 1 km^{2} (0.386 sq mi or 247 acres) and river estuaries.

Veurey-Voroize (French pronunciation: [vœʁɛ vɔʁwaz]; Arpitan: Vorê) is a commune in the Isère department in southeastern France. It is part of the Grenoble urban unit (agglomeration).

== Population ==
Historical population
Year	Pop.	±% p.a.
1968	521	—
1975	661	+3.46%
1982	1,020	+6.39%
1990	1,080	+0.72%
1999	1,317	+2.23%
2007	1,372	+0.51%
2012	1,396	+0.35%
2017	1,438	+0.59%
2023	1,427	−0.13%
Source: INSEE

== See also ==
- Parc naturel régional du Vercors
