= Torviscosa =

Torviscosa Il Tor (Friulian)
- Comune
- Comune di Torviscosa
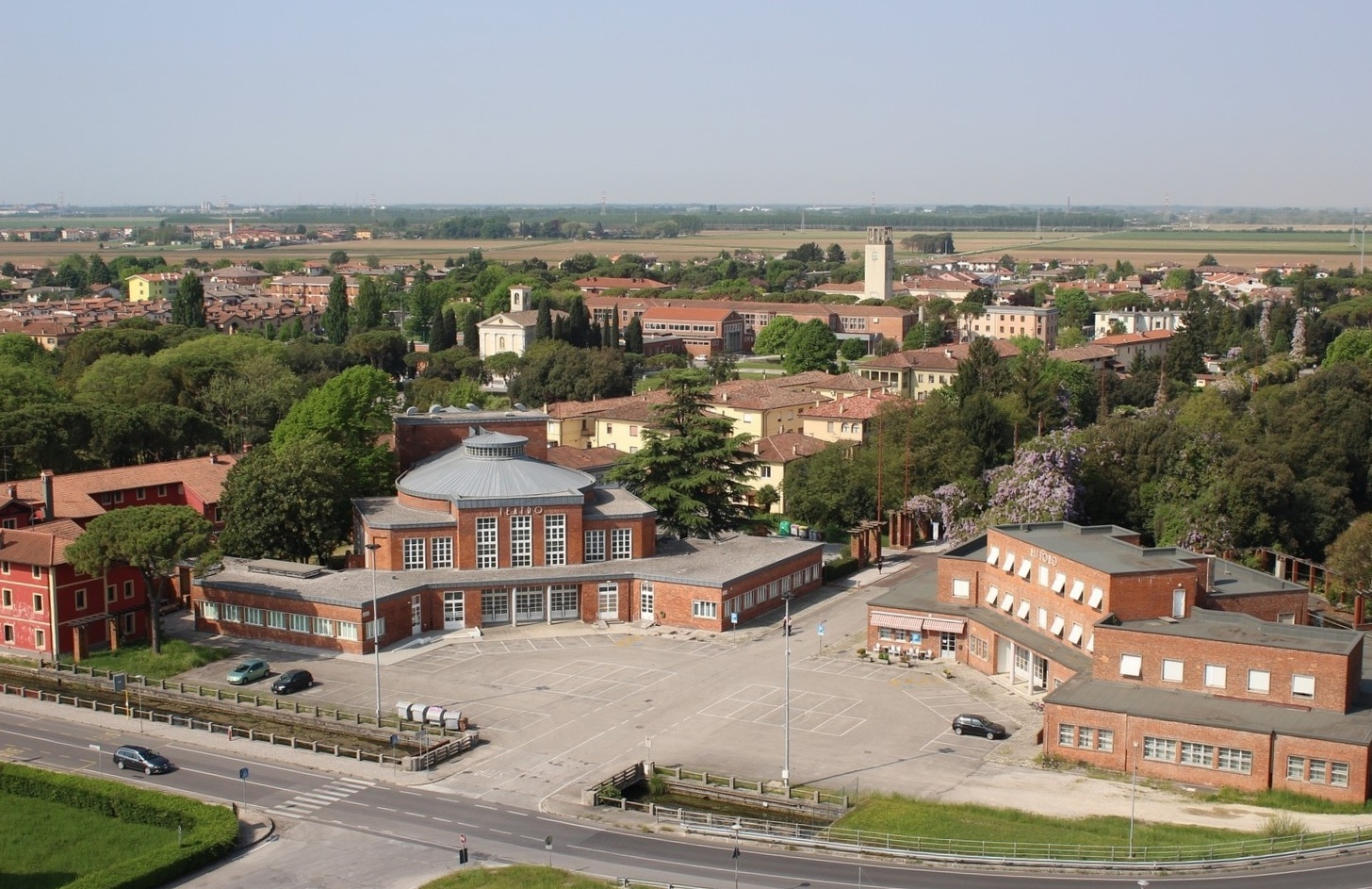

- Location within Italy Location within Friuli-Venezia Giulia
- Coordinates: 45°49′N 13°17′E
- Country: Italy
- Region: Friuli-Venezia Giulia
- Province: Udine (UD)
- Frazioni: Malisana

Government
  - Mayor: Roberto Fasan

Area
  - Total: 48.2 km^{2} (18.6 sq mi)
- Elevation: 3 m (9.8 ft)

Population (28 February 2017)
  - Total: 2,818
  - Density: 58.5/km^{2} (151/sq mi)
- Demonym: Torzuinesi
- Time zone: UTC+1 (CET)
  - Summer (DST): UTC+2 (CEST)
- Postal code: 33050
- Dialing code: 0431
- Patron saint: Assumption of Mary
- Saint day: 15 August
- Website: Official website

Torviscosa (Friulian: Tor di Zuin, locally Il Tor) is a comune (municipality) in the Regional decentralization entity of Udine in the Italian region of Friuli-Venezia Giulia, located about 45 kilometres (28 mi) northwest of Trieste and about 30 kilometres (19 mi) south of Udine.

The municipality of Torviscosa contains the frazione (borough) of Malisana.

Torviscosa borders the following municipalities: Bagnaria Arsa, Cervignano del Friuli, Gonars, Grado, Porpetto, San Giorgio di Nogaro, Terzo d'Aquileia.

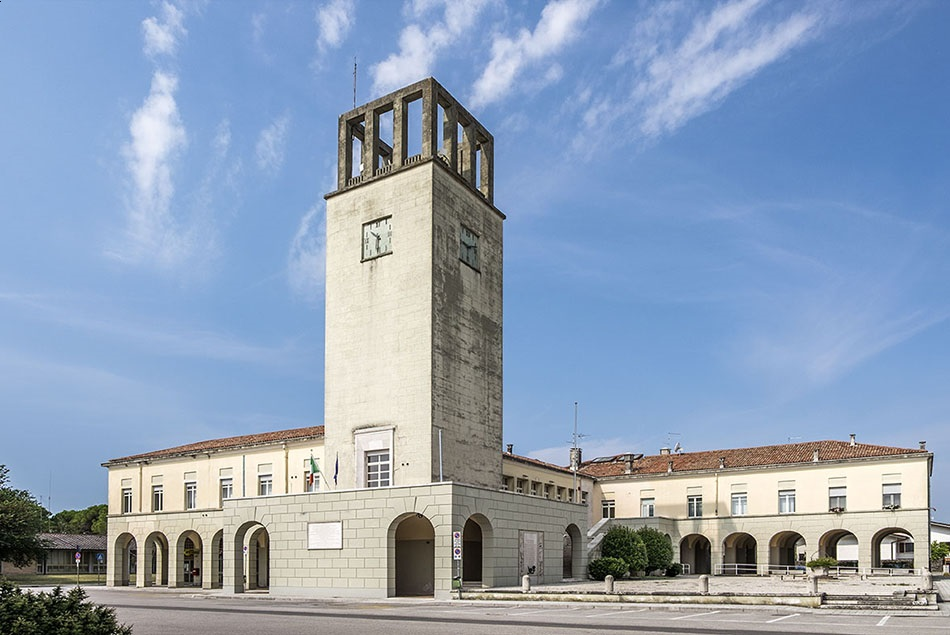
Town Hall

== Twin towns ==
- Champ-sur-Drac, France
