= Miribel-Lanchâtre =

- Commune
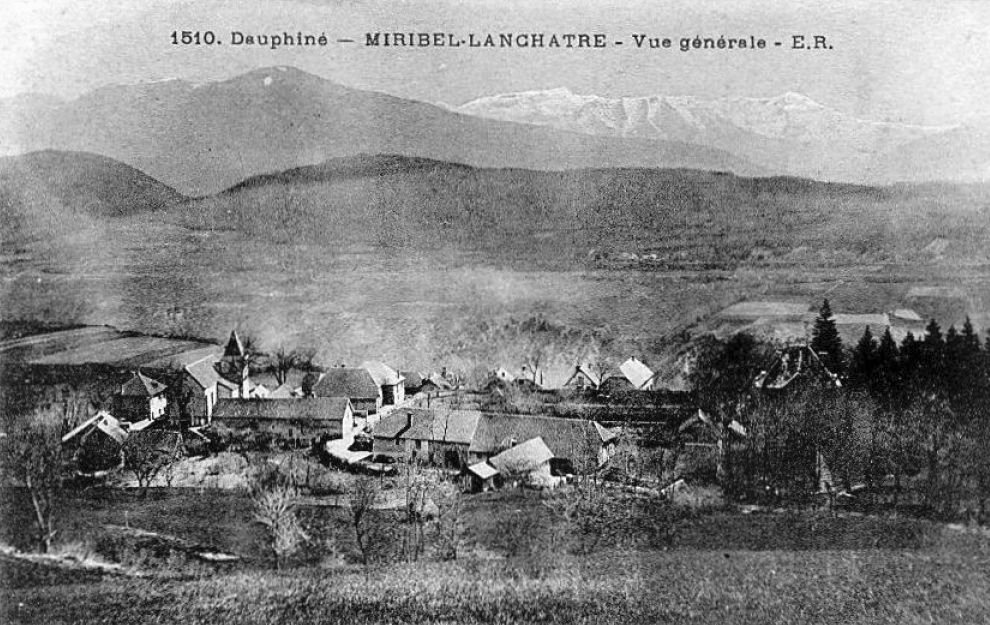
- Miribel-Lanchâtre at the start of the 20th century
- Location of Miribel-Lanchâtre
- Location within France Location within Auvergne-Rhône-Alpes
- Coordinates: 44°58′32″N 5°37′16″E
- Country: France
- Region: Auvergne-Rhône-Alpes
- Department: Isère
- Arrondissement: Grenoble
- Canton: Matheysine-Trièves
- Intercommunality: Grenoble-Alpes Métropole

Government
  - Mayor (2020–2026): Michel Gauthier
- Area^{1}: 10 km^{2} (3.9 sq mi)
- Highest elevation: 1,509 m (4,951 ft)
- Lowest elevation: 423 m (1,388 ft)
- Population (2023): 445
  - Density: 44/km^{2} (120/sq mi)
- Time zone: UTC+01:00 (CET)
  - Summer (DST): UTC+02:00 (CEST)
- INSEE/Postal code: 38235 /38450
- ^{1} French Land Register data, which excludes lakes, ponds, glaciers > 1 km^{2} (0.386 sq mi or 247 acres) and river estuaries.

Miribel-Lanchâtre (French pronunciation: [miʁibɛl lɑ̃ʃatʁ]; Occitan: Mirabèu e L'Enchastre) is a commune in the Isère department in south-eastern France.

== Geography ==
Miribel-Lanchâtre is about 30 km (19 mi) south of Grenoble, on the south-eastern slopes of the Vercors. The commune is made up of several hamlets in the canton of Monestier-de-Clermont. The main village, Lanchâtre, has a church, a castle, the town hall and a primary school. The hamlet of Le Vernay lies 3 km (1.9 mi) further uphill along a mountain road, near a cross that serves as a viewpoint. Several hiking trails in the lower Vercors begin in the commune. They overlook the Trièves area toward the Obiou massif, about 50 km (31 mi) away.

== Population ==
Historical population
Year	Pop.	±% p.a.
1968	72	—
1975	75	+0.58%
1982	193	+14.46%
1990	217	+1.48%
1999	251	+1.63%
2007	339	+3.83%
2012	385	+2.58%
2017	433	+2.38%
2023	445	+0.46%
Source: INSEE

== See also ==
- Communes of the Isère department
- Parc naturel régional du Vercors
