= Château d'Herbeys =

Coordinates: 45.1386°N 5.7912°E

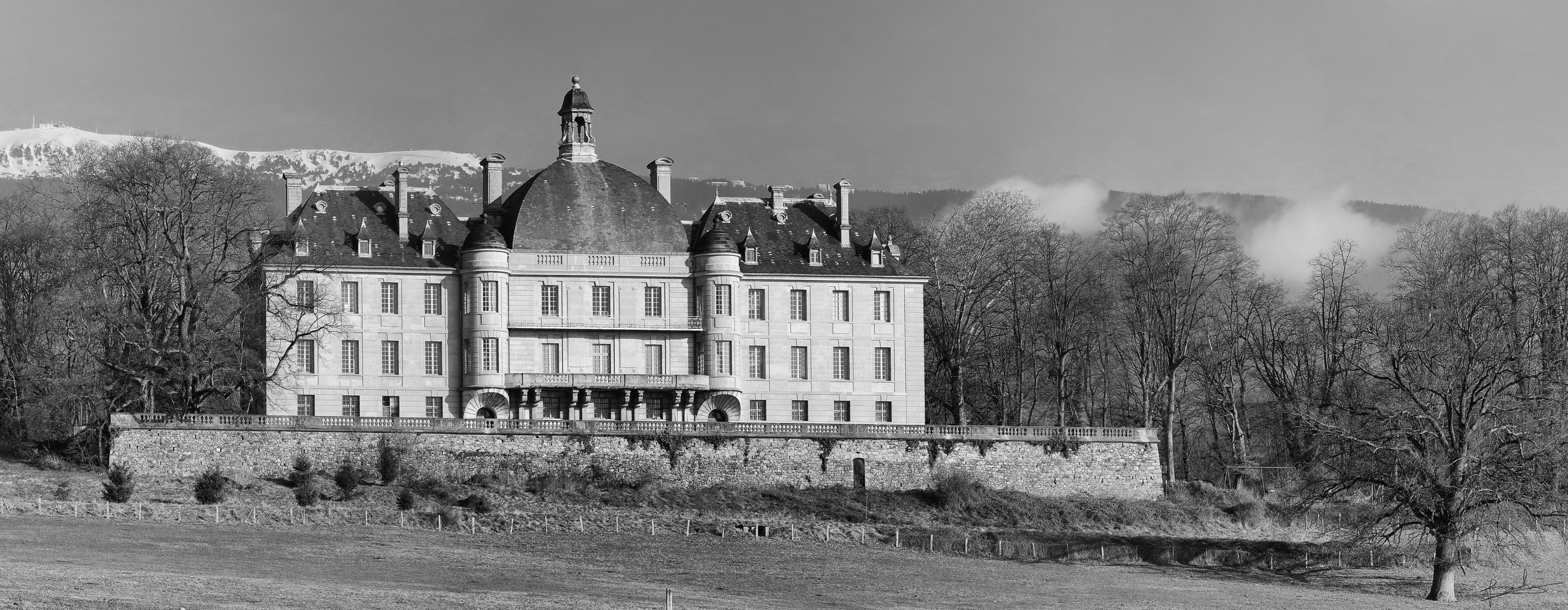
- Interactive map of Château d'Herbeys

General information
- Location: France
- Completed: 17th century

Château d'Herbeys is an historic château in Herbeys, Isère, France. It was built in the 17th century. It has been listed as an official historical monument since December 14, 1949.
