= Grenoble-Alpes Métropole =

Coordinates: 45.19°N 5.72°E

- Métropole
- Interactive map of Grenoble-Alpes Métropole
- Country: France
- Region: Auvergne-Rhône-Alpes
- Department: Isère
- No. of communes: {{{nbcomm}}}
- Established: 2015

Government
  - President (2020–2026): Christophe Ferrari
- Area: 545.5 km^{2} (210.6 sq mi)
- Population (2018): 445,059
  - Density: 815.9/km^{2} (2,113/sq mi)
- Website: www.lametro.fr

Grenoble-Alpes Métropole (French pronunciation: [ɡʁənɔbl alp metʁɔpɔl]) is the métropole, an intercommunal structure, centred on the city of Grenoble. It is located in the Isère department, in the Auvergne-Rhône-Alpes region, eastern France. It was created in January 2015, replacing the previous Communauté d'agglomération de Grenoble. Its area is 545.5 km^{2}. Its population was 445,059 in 2018, of which 157,650 in Grenoble proper.

== Communes ==
The 49 communes of the metropolis are:

1. Bresson
2. Brié-et-Angonnes
3. Champagnier
4. Champ-sur-Drac
5. Claix
6. Corenc
7. Domène
8. Échirolles
9. Eybens
10. Fontaine
11. Fontanil-Cornillon
12. Gières
13. Grenoble
14. Herbeys
15. Jarrie
16. La Tronche
17. Le Gua
18. Le Pont-de-Claix
19. Le Sappey-en-Chartreuse
20. Meylan
21. Miribel-Lanchâtre
22. Montchaboud
23. Mont-Saint-Martin
24. Murianette
25. Notre-Dame-de-Commiers
26. Notre-Dame-de-Mésage
27. Noyarey
28. Poisat
29. Proveysieux
30. Quaix-en-Chartreuse
31. Saint-Barthélemy-de-Séchilienne
32. Saint-Égrève
33. Saint-Georges-de-Commiers
34. Saint-Martin-d'Hères
35. Saint-Martin-le-Vinoux
36. Saint-Paul-de-Varces
37. Saint-Pierre-de-Mésage
38. Sarcenas
39. Sassenage
40. Séchilienne
41. Seyssinet-Pariset
42. Seyssins
43. Varces-Allières-et-Risset
44. Vaulnaveys-le-Bas
45. Vaulnaveys-le-Haut
46. Venon
47. Veurey-Voroize
48. Vif
49. Vizille

== See also ==
- Urban unit of Grenoble
- Grenoble metropolitan area
