= Le Gua, Isère =

Le Gua
- Commune
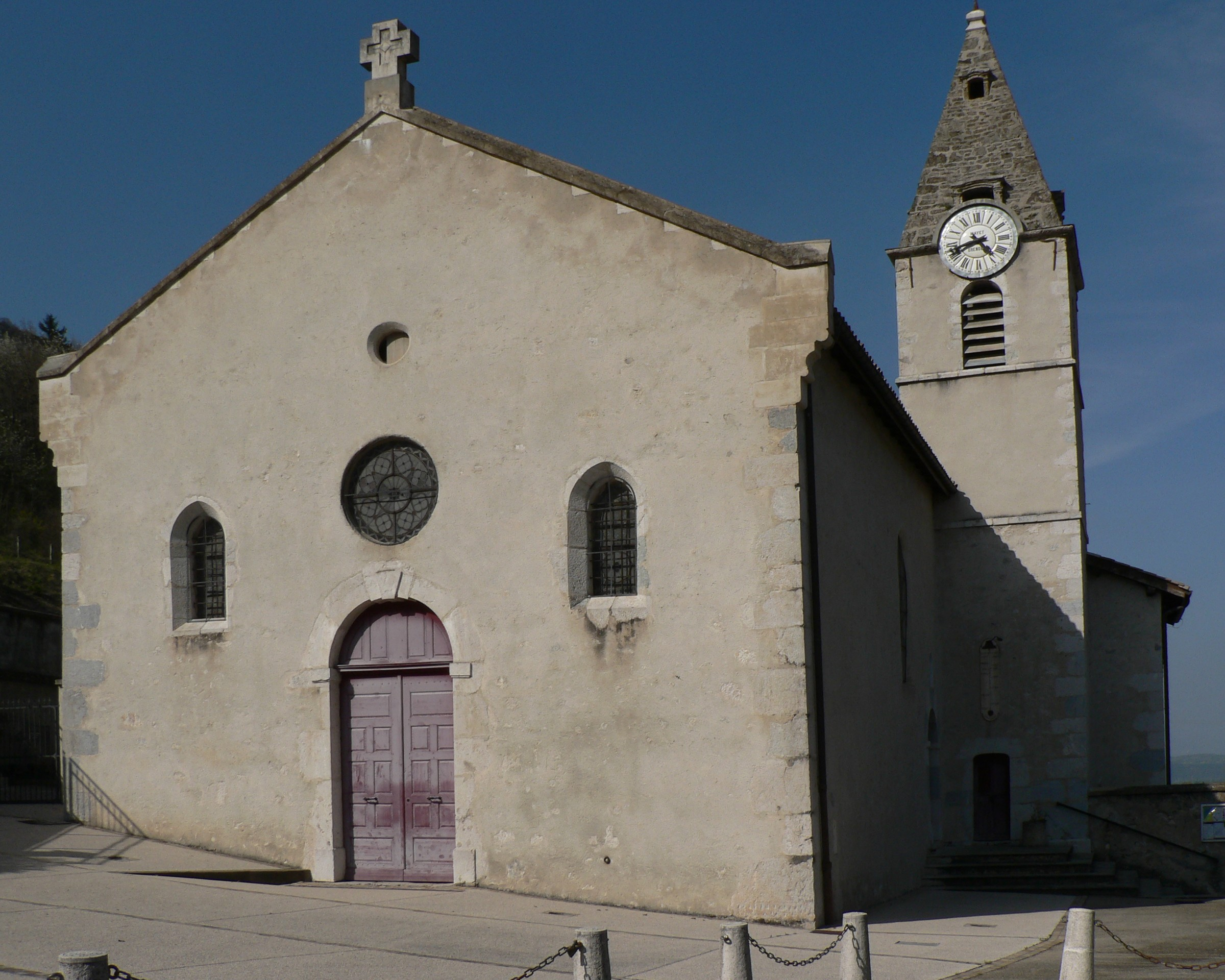
- The church of Le Gua

- Coat of arms
- Location of Le Gua
- Location within France Location within Auvergne-Rhône-Alpes
- Coordinates: 45°01′34″N 5°38′54″E
- Country: France
- Region: Auvergne-Rhône-Alpes
- Department: Isère
- Arrondissement: Grenoble
- Canton: Le Pont-de-Claix
- Intercommunality: Grenoble-Alpes Métropole

Government
  - Mayor (2020–2026): Simon Farley
- Area^{1}: 28.4 km^{2} (11.0 sq mi)
- Elevation: 385 m (1,263 ft)
- Highest elevation: 2,161 m (7,090 ft)
- Lowest elevation: 340 m (1,120 ft)
- Population (2023): 1,928
  - Density: 67.9/km^{2} (176/sq mi)
- Time zone: UTC+01:00 (CET)
  - Summer (DST): UTC+02:00 (CEST)
- INSEE/Postal code: 38187 /38450
- ^{1} French Land Register data, which excludes lakes, ponds, glaciers > 1 km^{2} (0.386 sq mi or 247 acres) and river estuaries.

Le Gua (French pronunciation: [lə ɡa]; Arpitan: Lo Goua) is a commune in the Isère department in southeastern France.

The town is home to the Fontaine Ardente, one of the Seven Wonders of Dauphiné.

== Population ==
Historical population
Year	Pop.	±% p.a.
1968	1,120	—
1975	1,135	+0.19%
1982	1,315	+2.13%
1990	1,505	+1.70%
1999	1,713	+1.45%
2007	1,855	+1.00%
2012	1,839	−0.17%
2017	1,779	−0.66%
2023	1,928	+1.35%
Source: INSEE

== See also ==
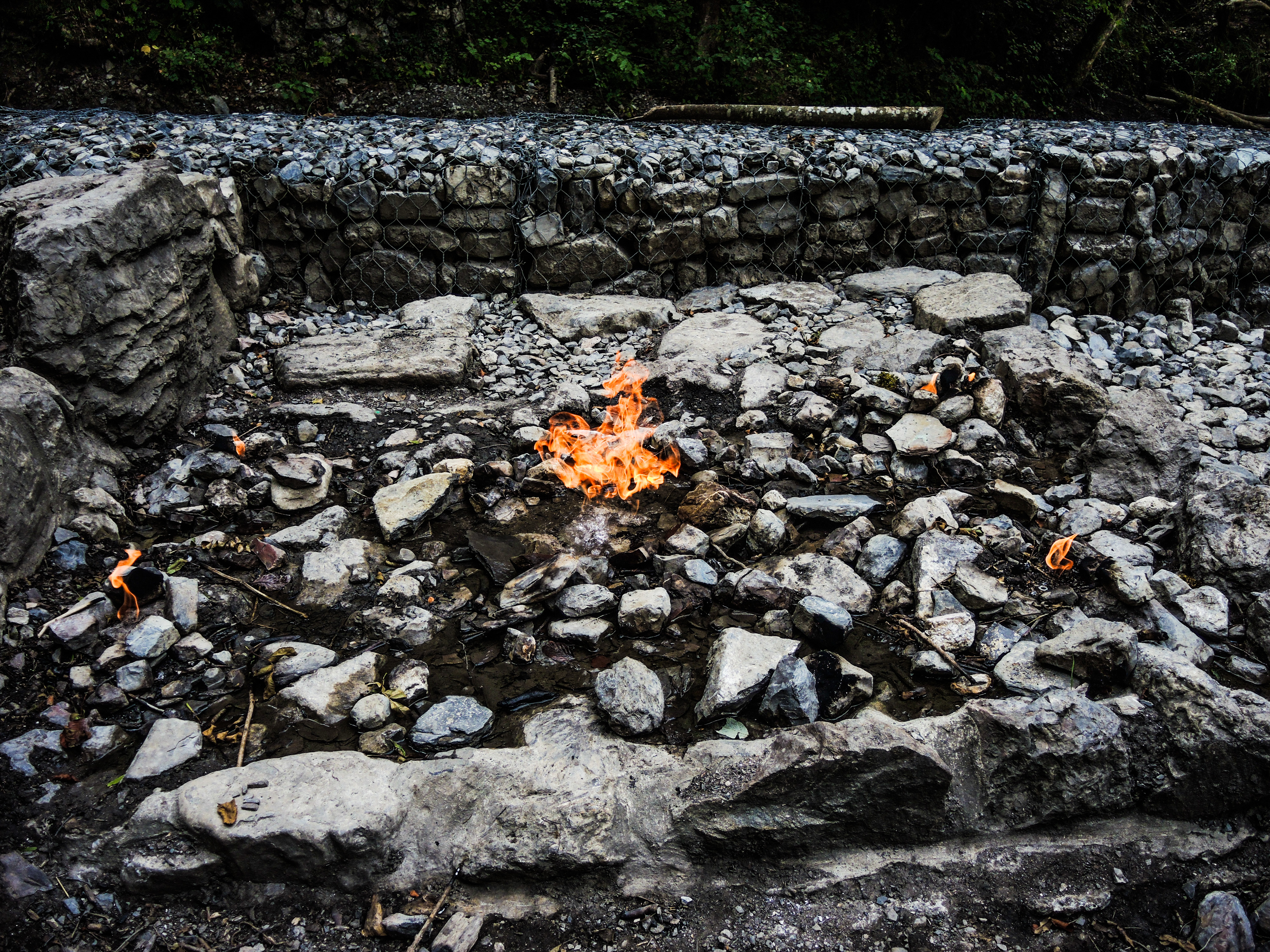
The Fontaine Ardente, one of the Seven Wonders of Dauphiné.

- Communes of the Isère department
- Parc naturel régional du Vercors
