= Le Pont-de-Claix =

- Commune
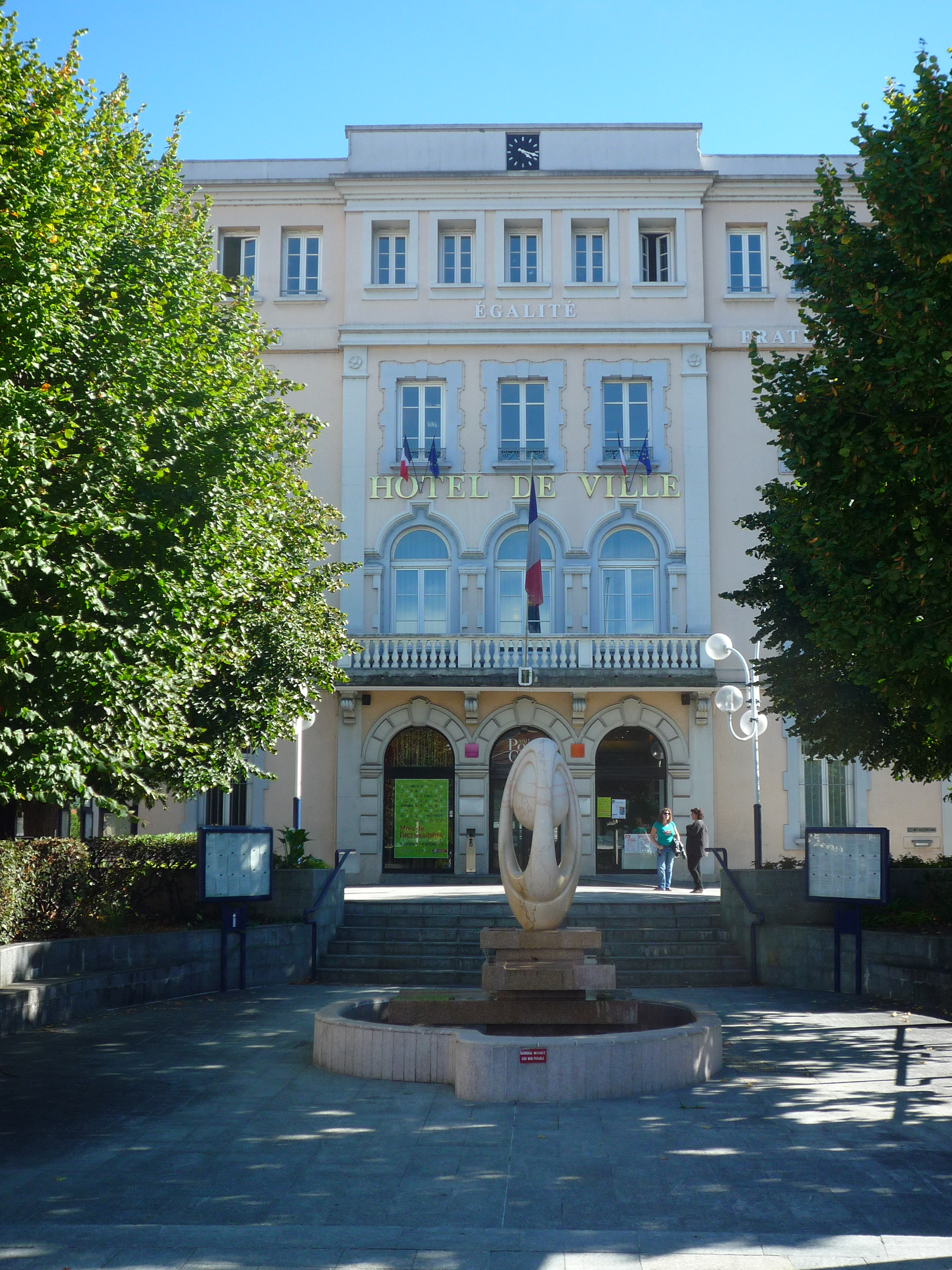
- Town hall

- Coat of arms
- Location of Le Pont-de-Claix
- Location within France Location within Auvergne-Rhône-Alpes
- Coordinates: 45°07′44″N 5°41′56″E
- Country: France
- Region: Auvergne-Rhône-Alpes
- Department: Isère
- Arrondissement: Grenoble
- Canton: Le Pont-de-Claix
- Intercommunality: Grenoble-Alpes Métropole

Government
  - Mayor (2020–2026): Christophe Ferrari
- Area^{1}: 5.6 km^{2} (2.2 sq mi)
- Elevation: 309 m (1,014 ft)
- Highest elevation: 391 m (1,283 ft)
- Lowest elevation: 227 m (745 ft)
- Population (2023): 10,956
  - Density: 2,000/km^{2} (5,100/sq mi)
- Time zone: UTC+01:00 (CET)
  - Summer (DST): UTC+02:00 (CEST)
- INSEE/Postal code: 38317 /38800
- ^{1} French Land Register data, which excludes lakes, ponds, glaciers > 1 km^{2} (0.386 sq mi or 247 acres) and river estuaries.

Le Pont-de-Claix (French pronunciation: [lə ˈpɔ̃ də ˈklɛ], literally The Bridge of Claix; Arpitan: Lo Pont-de-Cllês) is a commune in the Isère department in southeastern France. It is part of the Grenoble urban unit (agglomeration).

== Population ==
Historical population

Year	Pop.	±% p.a.
1876	1,032	—
1881	1,141	+2.03%
1886	1,130	−0.19%
1891	979	−2.83%
1896	903	−1.60%
1901	936	+0.72%
1906	1,105	+3.38%
1911	1,021	−1.57%
1921	1,558	+4.32%
1926	1,765	+2.53%
1931	2,556	+7.69%
1936	2,440	−0.92%

Year	Pop.	±% p.a.
1946	2,550	+0.44%
1954	3,468	+3.92%
1962	4,914	+4.45%
1968	9,790	+12.17%
1975	12,746	+3.84%
1982	11,787	−1.11%
1990	11,871	+0.09%
1999	11,612	−0.24%
2007	11,585	−0.03%
2012	11,221	−0.64%
2017	10,435	−1.44%
2023	10,956	+0.82%

Source: EHESS and INSEE (1968-2023)

== International relations ==
Le Pont-de-Claix is twinned with:

- Winsen, Germany

== See also ==
- Communes of the Isère department
