= Corrençon-en-Vercors =

- Commune
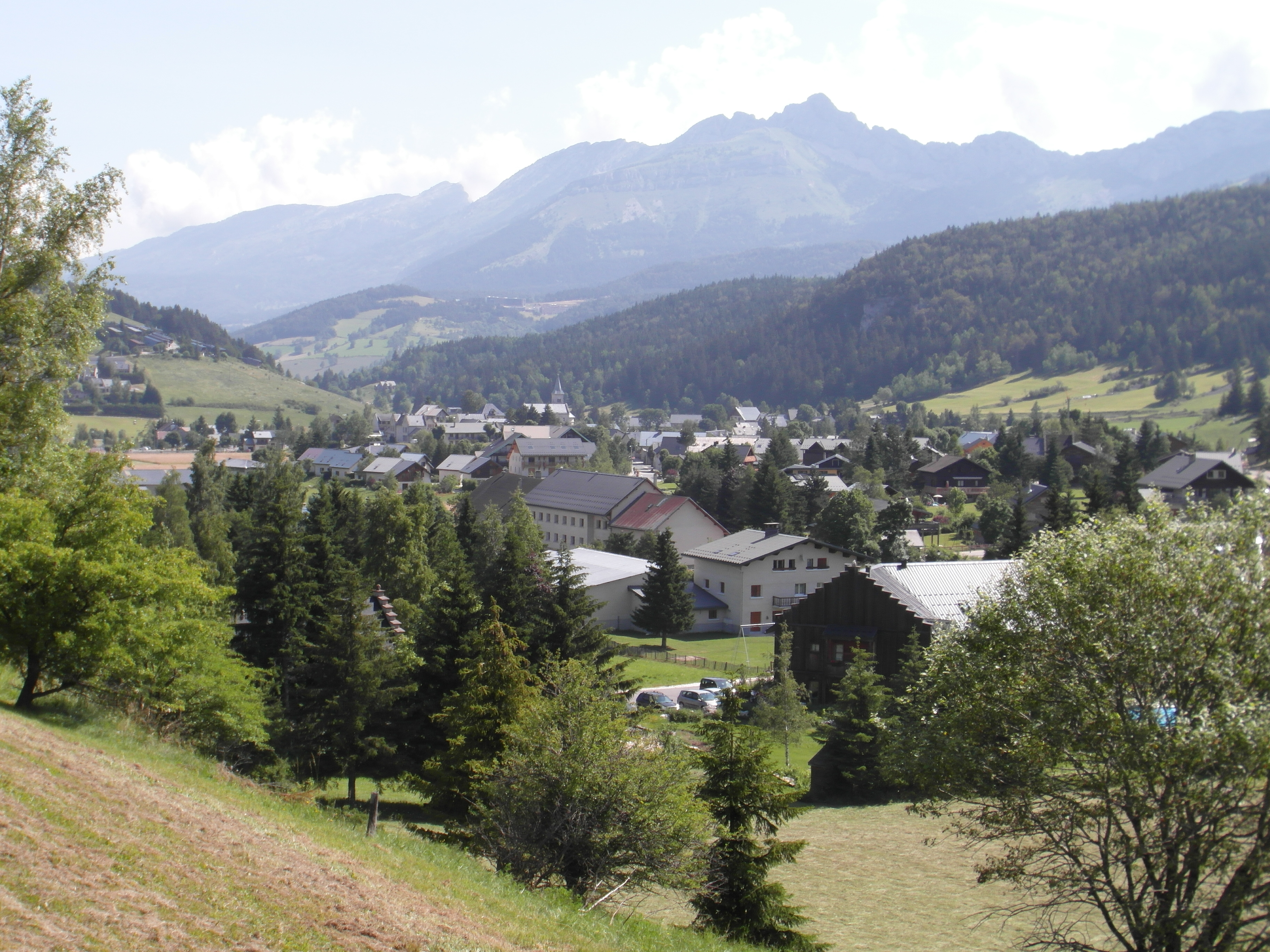
- A general view of Corrençon
- Location of Corrençon-en-Vercors
- Location within France Location within Auvergne-Rhône-Alpes
- Coordinates: 45°01′56″N 5°31′37″E
- Country: France
- Region: Auvergne-Rhône-Alpes
- Department: Isère
- Arrondissement: Grenoble
- Canton: Fontaine-Vercors
- Intercommunality: Massif du Vercors

Government
  - Mayor (2020–2026): Thomas Guillet
- Area^{1}: 39 km^{2} (15 sq mi)
- Highest elevation: 2,286 m (7,500 ft)
- Lowest elevation: 1,055 m (3,461 ft)
- Population (2023): 374
  - Density: 9.6/km^{2} (25/sq mi)
- Time zone: UTC+01:00 (CET)
  - Summer (DST): UTC+02:00 (CEST)
- INSEE/Postal code: 38129 /38250
- ^{1} French Land Register data, which excludes lakes, ponds, glaciers > 1 km^{2} (0.386 sq mi or 247 acres) and river estuaries.

Corrençon-en-Vercors (French pronunciation: [kɔʁɑ̃sɔ̃ ɑ̃ vɛʁkɔʁ], literally Corrençon in Vercors) is a commune in the Isère department in southeastern France.

== Population ==
Historical population
Year	Pop.	±% p.a.
1968	159	—
1975	193	+2.81%
1982	259	+4.29%
1990	264	+0.24%
1999	322	+2.23%
2007	364	+1.54%
2012	358	−0.33%
2017	354	−0.22%
2023	374	+0.92%
Source: INSEE

== See also ==
- Communes of the Isère department
- Parc naturel régional du Vercors
