= Sassenage =

- Commune
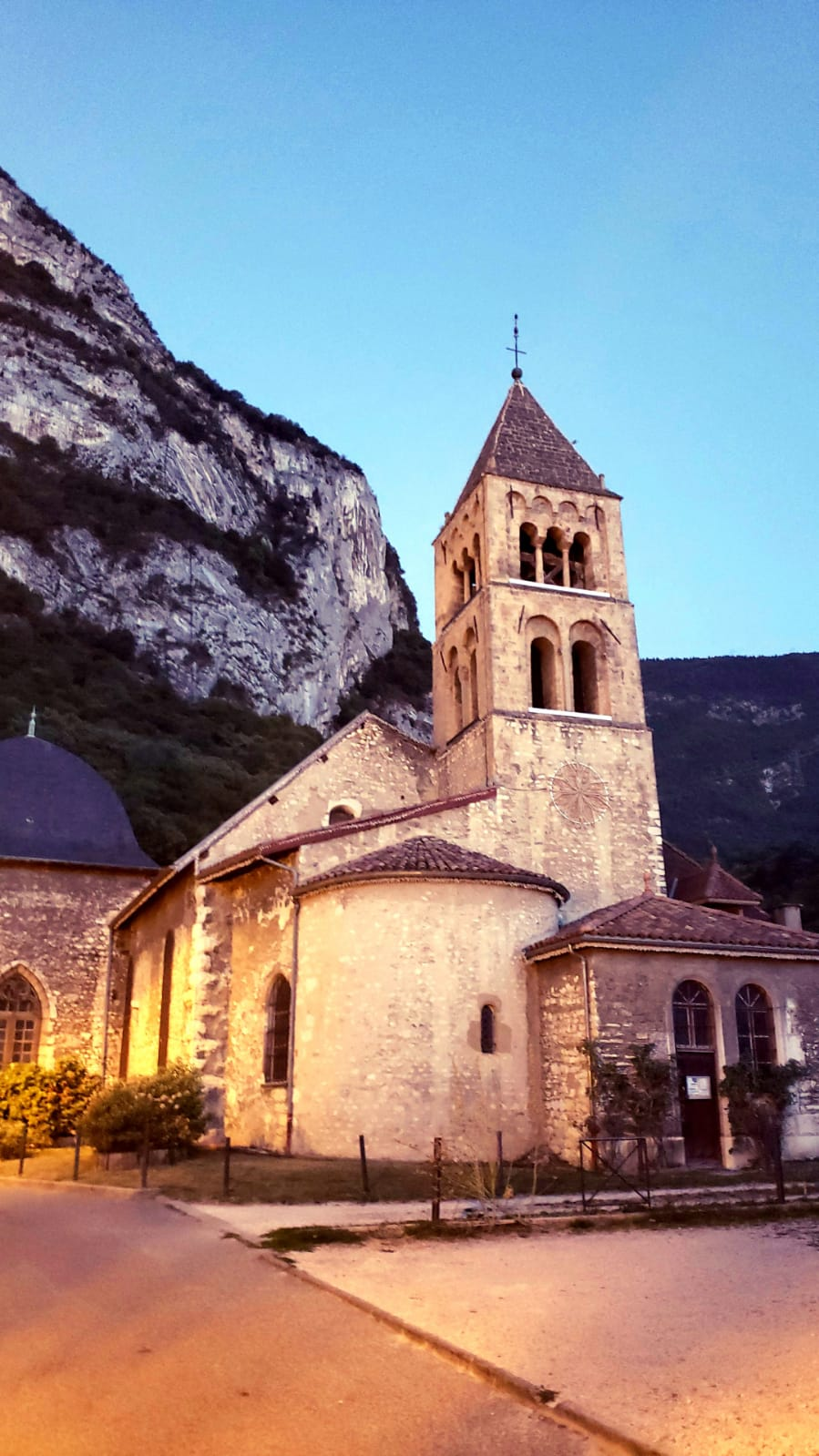
- St Pierre church in the centre of the village, at the foot of the Vercors massif

- Coat of arms
- Location of Sassenage
- Location within France Location within Auvergne-Rhône-Alpes
- Coordinates: 45°12′21″N 5°39′56″E
- Country: France
- Region: Auvergne-Rhône-Alpes
- Department: Isère
- Arrondissement: Grenoble
- Canton: Fontaine-Vercors
- Intercommunality: Grenoble-Alpes Métropole

Government
  - Mayor (2023–2026): Michel Vendra
- Area^{1}: 13 km^{2} (5.0 sq mi)
- Highest elevation: 1,649 m (5,410 ft)
- Lowest elevation: 199 m (653 ft)
- Population (2023): 11,646
  - Density: 900/km^{2} (2,300/sq mi)
- Time zone: UTC+01:00 (CET)
  - Summer (DST): UTC+02:00 (CEST)
- INSEE/Postal code: 38474 /38360
- ^{1} French Land Register data, which excludes lakes, ponds, glaciers > 1 km^{2} (0.386 sq mi or 247 acres) and river estuaries.

Sassenage (French pronunciation: [sasnaʒ]; Arpitan: Sassenâjo) is a commune in the Isère department in southeastern France, lying in the north-west of the Grenoble urban area (and administratively within the boundaries of the Grenoble-Alpes metropolitan authority). Its historic centre is on the valley floor at the foot of a large cliff face, with housing also stretching up the lower slopes of the Vercors massif and more recent developments towards Fontaine and the Drac river.

== Population ==
Historical population

Year	Pop.	±% p.a.
1793	290	—
1800	1,242	+23.10%
1806	1,050	−2.76%
1821	1,216	+0.98%
1831	1,155	−0.51%
1836	1,420	+4.22%
1841	1,450	+0.42%
1846	1,464	+0.19%
1851	1,514	+0.67%
1856	1,511	−0.04%
1861	1,505	−0.08%
1866	1,708	+2.56%
1872	1,523	−1.89%
1876	1,544	+0.34%
1881	1,632	+1.11%
1886	1,560	−0.90%
1891	1,549	−0.14%
1896	1,587	+0.49%
1901	1,559	−0.36%

Year	Pop.	±% p.a.
1906	1,347	−2.88%
1911	1,275	−1.09%
1921	1,344	+0.53%
1926	1,724	+5.11%
1931	1,821	+1.10%
1936	1,625	−2.25%
1946	1,648	+0.14%
1954	2,439	+5.02%
1962	2,589	+0.75%
1968	4,118	+8.04%
1975	7,021	+7.92%
1982	8,945	+3.52%
1990	9,788	+1.13%
1999	9,735	−0.06%
2007	10,631	+1.11%
2012	11,473	+1.54%
2017	11,376	−0.17%
2023	11,646	+0.39%

Source: EHESS and INSEE (1968-2023)

== International relations ==
Sassenage is twinned with:

- Anykščiai, Lithuania
- Meßkirch, Germany
- Sasso Marconi, Italy

== See also ==
- Parc naturel régional du Vercors
- Communes of the Isère department
