= Champ-sur-Drac =

- Commune
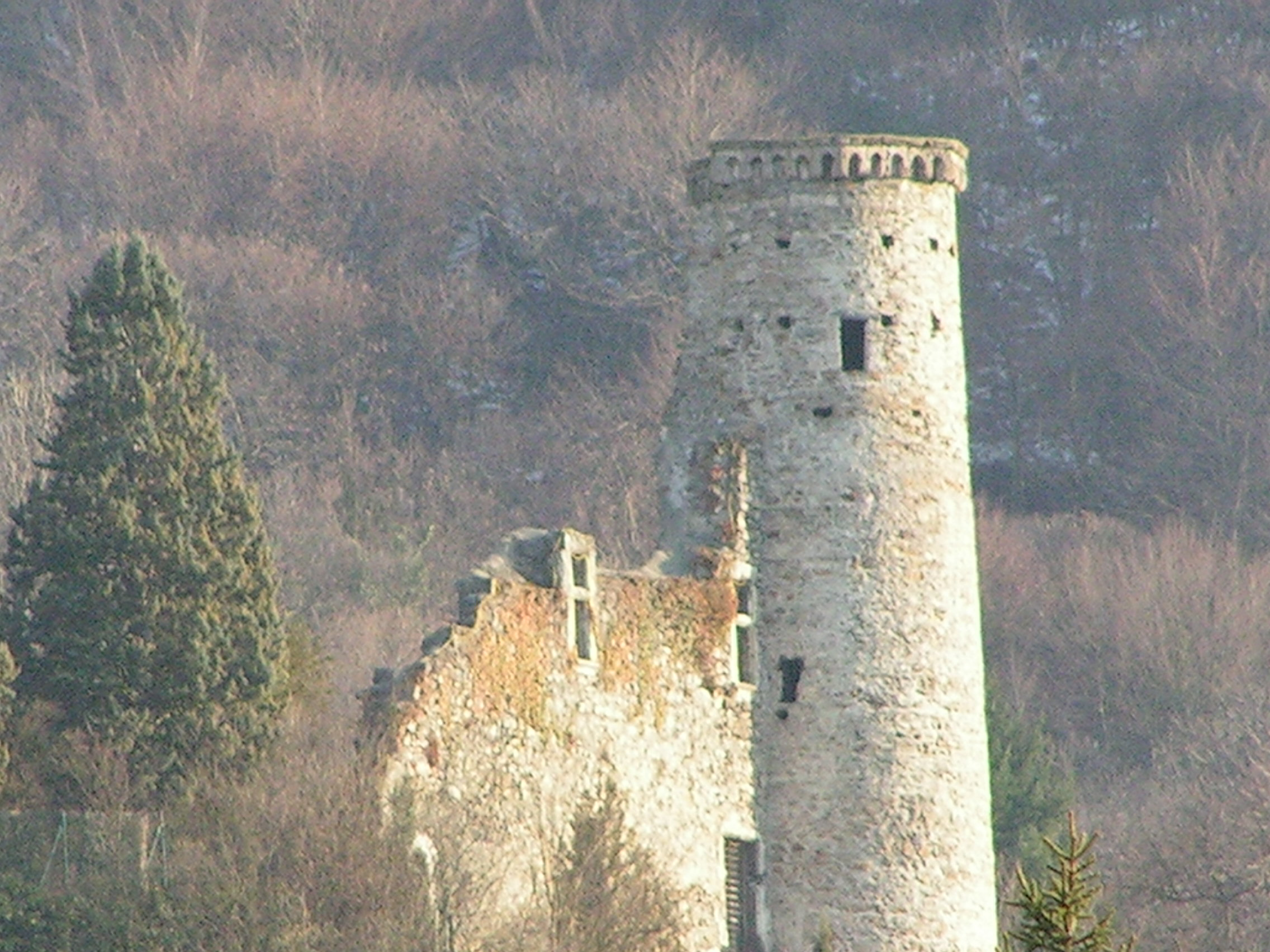
- The tower of Champ-sur-Drac

- Coat of arms
- Location of Champ-sur-Drac
- Location within France Location within Auvergne-Rhône-Alpes
- Coordinates: 45°04′44″N 5°43′55″E
- Country: France
- Region: Auvergne-Rhône-Alpes
- Department: Isère
- Arrondissement: Grenoble
- Canton: Le Pont-de-Claix
- Intercommunality: Grenoble-Alpes Métropole

Government
  - Mayor (2020–2026): Francis Dietrich
- Area^{1}: 8.92 km^{2} (3.44 sq mi)
- Elevation: 319 m (1,047 ft)
- Highest elevation: 1,281 m (4,203 ft)
- Lowest elevation: 269 m (883 ft)
- Population (2023): 3,335
  - Density: 374/km^{2} (968/sq mi)
- Time zone: UTC+01:00 (CET)
  - Summer (DST): UTC+02:00 (CEST)
- INSEE/Postal code: 38071 /38560
- ^{1} French Land Register data, which excludes lakes, ponds, glaciers > 1 km^{2} (0.386 sq mi or 247 acres) and river estuaries.

Champ-sur-Drac (French pronunciation: [ʃɑ̃ syʁ dʁak]) is a commune in the Isère department in southeastern France. It is situated at the foot of the Alps, at the confluence of the River and the Drac. It is part of the Grenoble urban unit (agglomeration).

== Population ==
Historical population
Year	Pop.	±% p.a.
1968	2,316	—
1975	2,605	+1.69%
1982	3,094	+2.49%
1990	3,044	−0.20%
1999	3,260	+0.76%
2007	3,146	−0.44%
2012	3,097	−0.31%
2017	3,007	−0.59%
2023	3,335	+1.74%
Source: INSEE

== Sister city ==
- Torviscosa, Italy (since 2006).

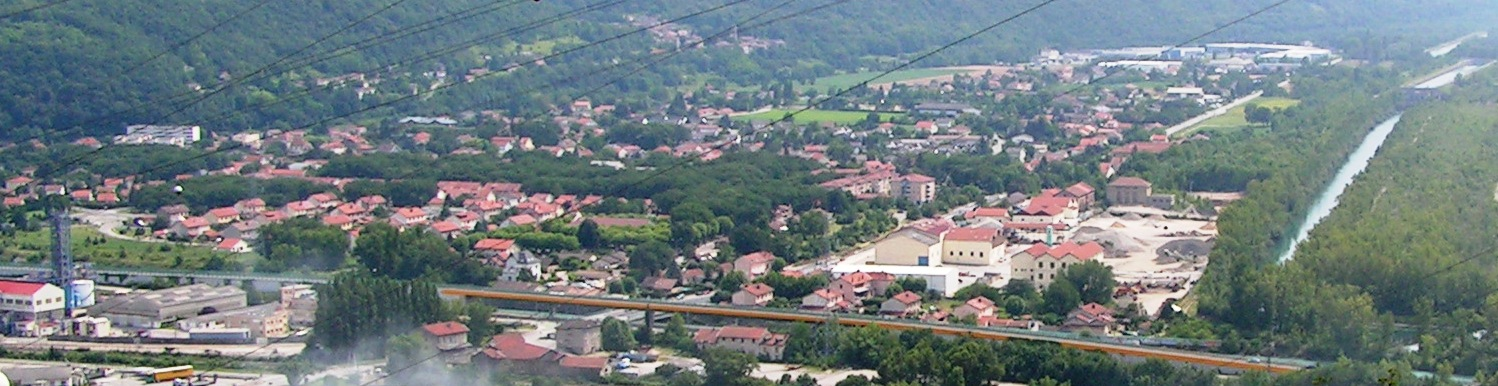

== See also ==
- Communes of the Isère department
