= Noyarey =

- Commune
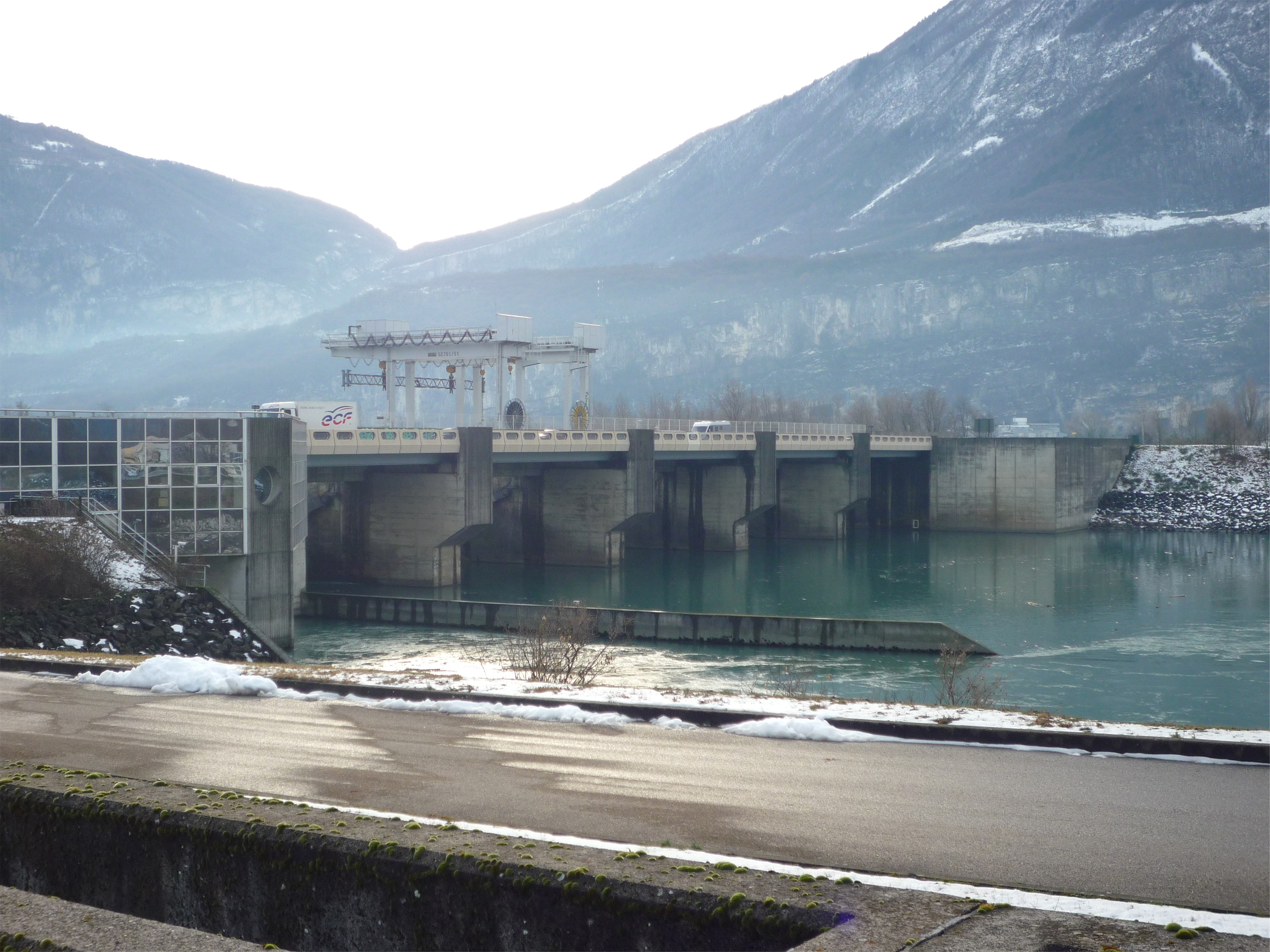
- Saint-Egrève dam

- Coat of arms
- Location of Noyarey
- Location within France Location within Auvergne-Rhône-Alpes
- Coordinates: 45°14′54″N 5°37′42″E
- Country: France
- Region: Auvergne-Rhône-Alpes
- Department: Isère
- Arrondissement: Grenoble
- Canton: Fontaine-Vercors
- Intercommunality: Grenoble-Alpes Métropole

Government
  - Mayor (2020–2026): Nelly Janin Quercia
- Area^{1}: 16.86 km^{2} (6.51 sq mi)
- Elevation: 225 m (738 ft)
- Highest elevation: 1,649 m (5,410 ft)
- Lowest elevation: 191 m (627 ft)
- Population (2023): 2,365
  - Density: 140.3/km^{2} (363.3/sq mi)
- Time zone: UTC+01:00 (CET)
  - Summer (DST): UTC+02:00 (CEST)
- INSEE/Postal code: 38281 /38360
- ^{1} French Land Register data, which excludes lakes, ponds, glaciers > 1 km^{2} (0.386 sq mi or 247 acres) and river estuaries.

Noyarey (French pronunciation: [nɔjaʁɛ]) is a commune in the Isère department in southeastern France. It is part of the Grenoble urban unit (agglomeration).

== Population ==
Historical population

| Year | Pop. | ±% p.a. |
|---|---|---|
| 1793 | 615 | — |
| 1800 | 703 | +1.93% |
| 1806 | 789 | +1.94% |
| 1821 | 816 | +0.22% |
| 1831 | 1,002 | +2.07% |
| 1836 | 1,077 | +1.45% |
| 1841 | 1,115 | +0.70% |
| 1846 | 1,049 | −1.21% |
| 1851 | 1,009 | −0.77% |
| 1856 | 973 | −0.72% |
| 1861 | 921 | −1.09% |
| 1866 | 910 | −0.24% |
| 1872 | 860 | −0.94% |
| 1876 | 821 | −1.15% |
| 1881 | 735 | −2.19% |
| 1886 | 768 | +0.88% |
| 1891 | 710 | −1.56% |
| 1896 | 727 | +0.47% |
| 1901 | 732 | +0.14% |

| Year | Pop. | ±% p.a. |
|---|---|---|
| 1906 | 717 | −0.41% |
| 1911 | 707 | −0.28% |
| 1921 | 652 | −0.81% |
| 1926 | 677 | +0.76% |
| 1931 | 701 | +0.70% |
| 1936 | 686 | −0.43% |
| 1946 | 679 | −0.10% |
| 1954 | 802 | +2.10% |
| 1962 | 828 | +0.40% |
| 1968 | 1,064 | +4.27% |
| 1975 | 1,187 | +1.58% |
| 1982 | 1,561 | +3.99% |
| 1990 | 1,950 | +2.82% |
| 1999 | 2,104 | +0.85% |
| 2007 | 2,064 | −0.24% |
| 2012 | 2,263 | +1.86% |
| 2017 | 2,223 | −0.36% |
| 2023 | 2,365 | +1.04% |

Source: EHESS and INSEE (1968-2023)

== Twin towns – sister cities ==
Noyarey is twinned with:

- Merone, Italy (2004)

== See also ==
- Parc naturel régional du Vercors
- Communes of the Isère department
