= Mont-Saint-Martin, Isère =

Mont-Saint-Martin
- Commune
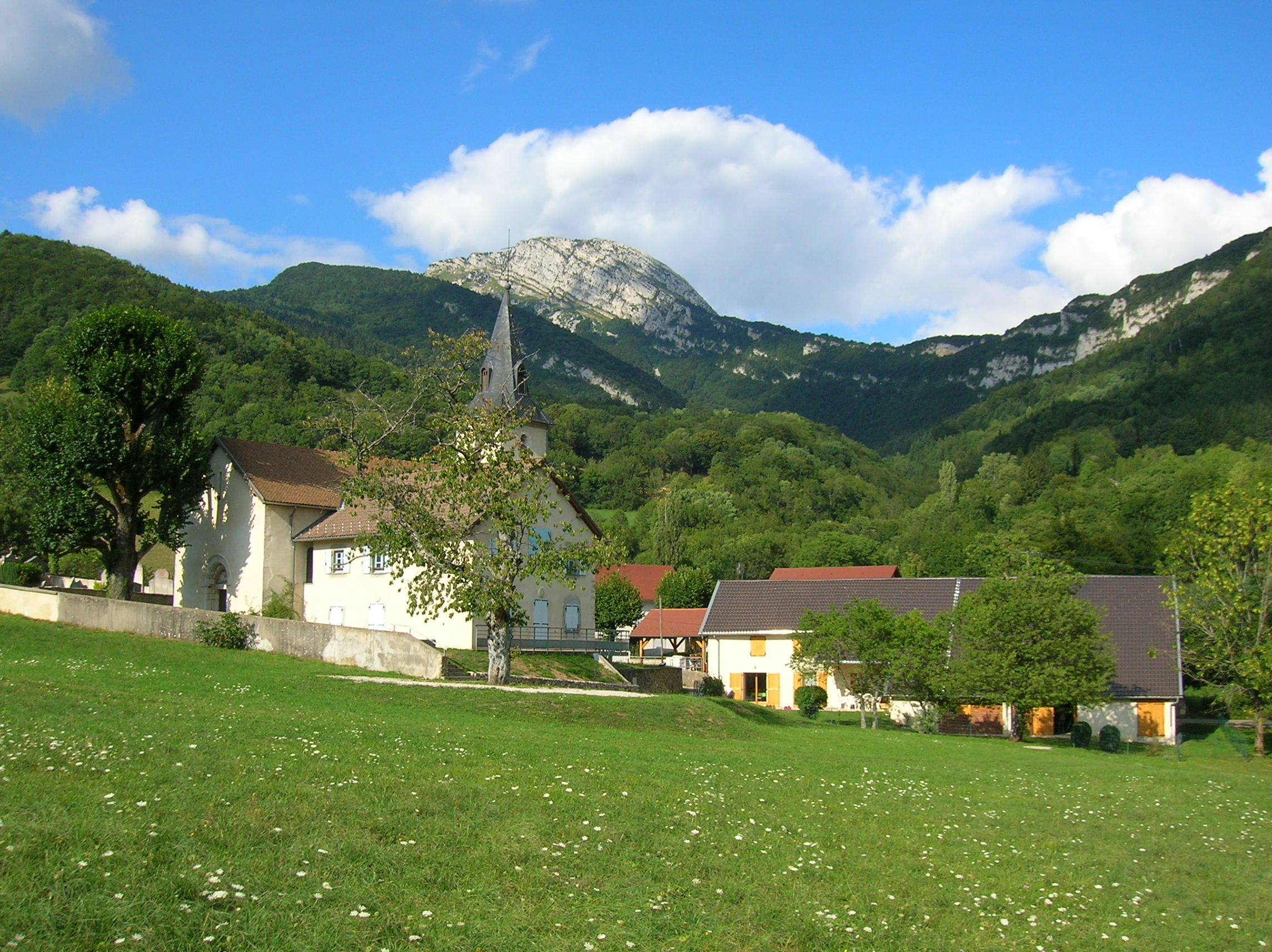
- The village of Mont-Saint-Martin
- Location of Mont-Saint-Martin
- Location within France Location within Auvergne-Rhône-Alpes
- Coordinates: 45°16′20″N 5°40′33″E
- Country: France
- Region: Auvergne-Rhône-Alpes
- Department: Isère
- Arrondissement: Grenoble
- Canton: Grenoble-2
- Intercommunality: Grenoble-Alpes Métropole

Government
  - Mayor (2023–2026): Marc Depinois
- Area^{1}: 5 km^{2} (1.9 sq mi)
- Elevation: 760 m (2,490 ft)
- Highest elevation: 1,844 m (6,050 ft)
- Lowest elevation: 520 m (1,710 ft)
- Population (2023): 93
  - Density: 19/km^{2} (48/sq mi)
- Time zone: UTC+01:00 (CET)
  - Summer (DST): UTC+02:00 (CEST)
- INSEE/Postal code: 38258 /38120
- ^{1} French Land Register data, which excludes lakes, ponds, glaciers > 1 km^{2} (0.386 sq mi or 247 acres) and river estuaries.

Mont-Saint-Martin (French pronunciation: [mɔ̃ sɛ̃ maʁtɛ̃]; Arpitan: Mont-Sant-Martin) is a commune in the Isère department in southeastern France.

== Population ==
Historical population
Year	Pop.	±% p.a.
1968	20	—
1975	45	+12.28%
1982	77	+7.98%
1990	77	+0.00%
1999	98	+2.72%
2007	96	−0.26%
2012	82	−3.10%
2017	79	−0.74%
2023	93	+2.76%
Source: INSEE

== See also ==
- Communes of the Isère department
