= Canton of Le Pont-de-Claix =

Coordinates: 45.13°N 5.70°E

The canton of Le Pont-de-Claix is an administrative division of the Isère department, eastern France. It was created at the French canton reorganisation which came into effect in March 2015. Its seat is in Le Pont-de-Claix.

It consists of the following communes:

1. Brié-et-Angonnes
2. Champagnier
3. Champ-sur-Drac
4. Le Gua
5. Herbeys
6. Jarrie
7. Notre-Dame-de-Commiers
8. Le Pont-de-Claix
9. Saint-Georges-de-Commiers
10. Saint-Paul-de-Varces
11. Varces-Allières-et-Risset
12. Vif
