= Fontanil-Cornillon =

- Commune
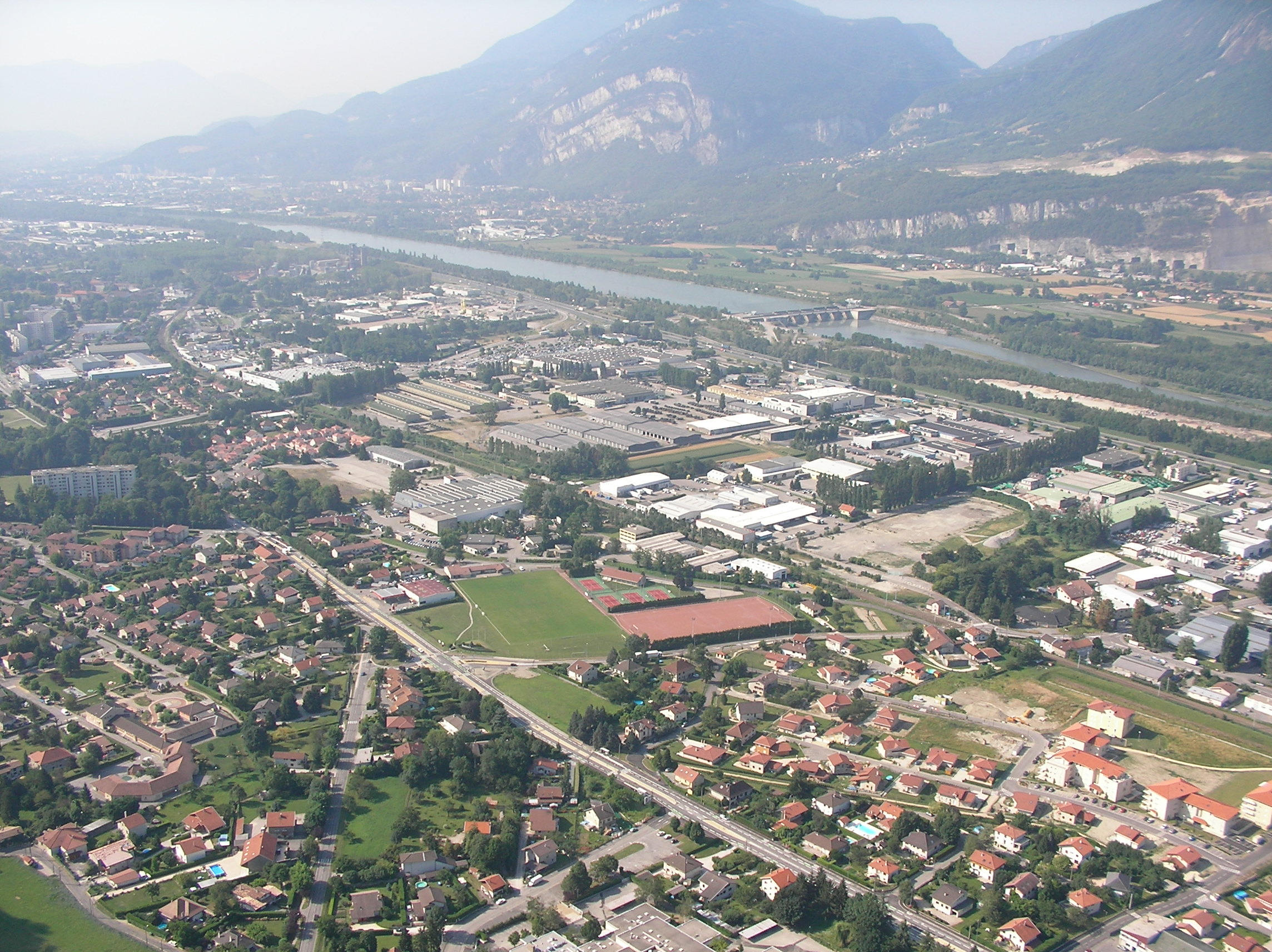
- A general view of Le Fontanil
- Location of Fontanil-Cornillon
- Location within France Location within Auvergne-Rhône-Alpes
- Coordinates: 45°15′22″N 5°39′57″E
- Country: France
- Region: Auvergne-Rhône-Alpes
- Department: Isère
- Arrondissement: Grenoble
- Canton: Grenoble-2
- Intercommunality: Grenoble-Alpes Métropole

Government
  - Mayor (2020–2026): Stéphane Dupont-Ferrier
- Area^{1}: 5.5 km^{2} (2.1 sq mi)
- Elevation: 204 m (669 ft)
- Highest elevation: 1,240 m (4,070 ft)
- Lowest elevation: 196 m (643 ft)
- Population (2023): 3,404
  - Density: 620/km^{2} (1,600/sq mi)
- Time zone: UTC+01:00 (CET)
  - Summer (DST): UTC+02:00 (CEST)
- INSEE/Postal code: 38170 /38120
- ^{1} French Land Register data, which excludes lakes, ponds, glaciers > 1 km^{2} (0.386 sq mi or 247 acres) and river estuaries.

Fontanil-Cornillon (French pronunciation: [fɔ̃tanil kɔʁnijɔ̃]) is a commune in the Isère department in southeastern France. It is part of the Grenoble urban unit (agglomeration).

== Population ==
Historical population

Year	Pop.	±% p.a.
1793	443	—
1800	399	−1.48%
1806	405	+0.25%
1821	508	+1.52%
1831	655	+2.57%
1836	668	+0.39%
1841	652	−0.48%
1846	621	−0.97%
1851	588	−1.09%
1856	612	+0.80%
1861	599	−0.43%
1866	567	−1.09%
1872	584	+0.49%
1876	534	−2.21%
1881	533	−0.04%
1886	502	−1.19%
1891	465	−1.52%
1896	466	+0.04%
1901	436	−1.32%

Year	Pop.	±% p.a.
1906	366	−3.44%
1911	345	−1.17%
1921	331	−0.41%
1926	381	+2.85%
1931	417	+1.82%
1936	400	−0.83%
1946	420	+0.49%
1954	524	+2.80%
1962	586	+1.41%
1968	1,123	+11.45%
1975	1,454	+3.76%
1982	1,682	+2.10%
1990	2,079	+2.68%
1999	2,454	+1.86%
2007	2,696	+1.18%
2012	2,796	+0.73%
2017	2,710	−0.62%
2023	3,404	+3.87%

Source: EHESS and INSEE (1968-2023)

== Twin towns ==
Fontanil-Cornillon is twinned with:

- Ponchatoula, Louisiana, United States, since 1987
- Monte Roberto, Italy, since 1992
- Saint-Joseph-du-Lac, Quebec, Canada, since 2008

== See also ==
- Communes of the Isère department
