= Saint-Georges-de-Commiers =

- Commune
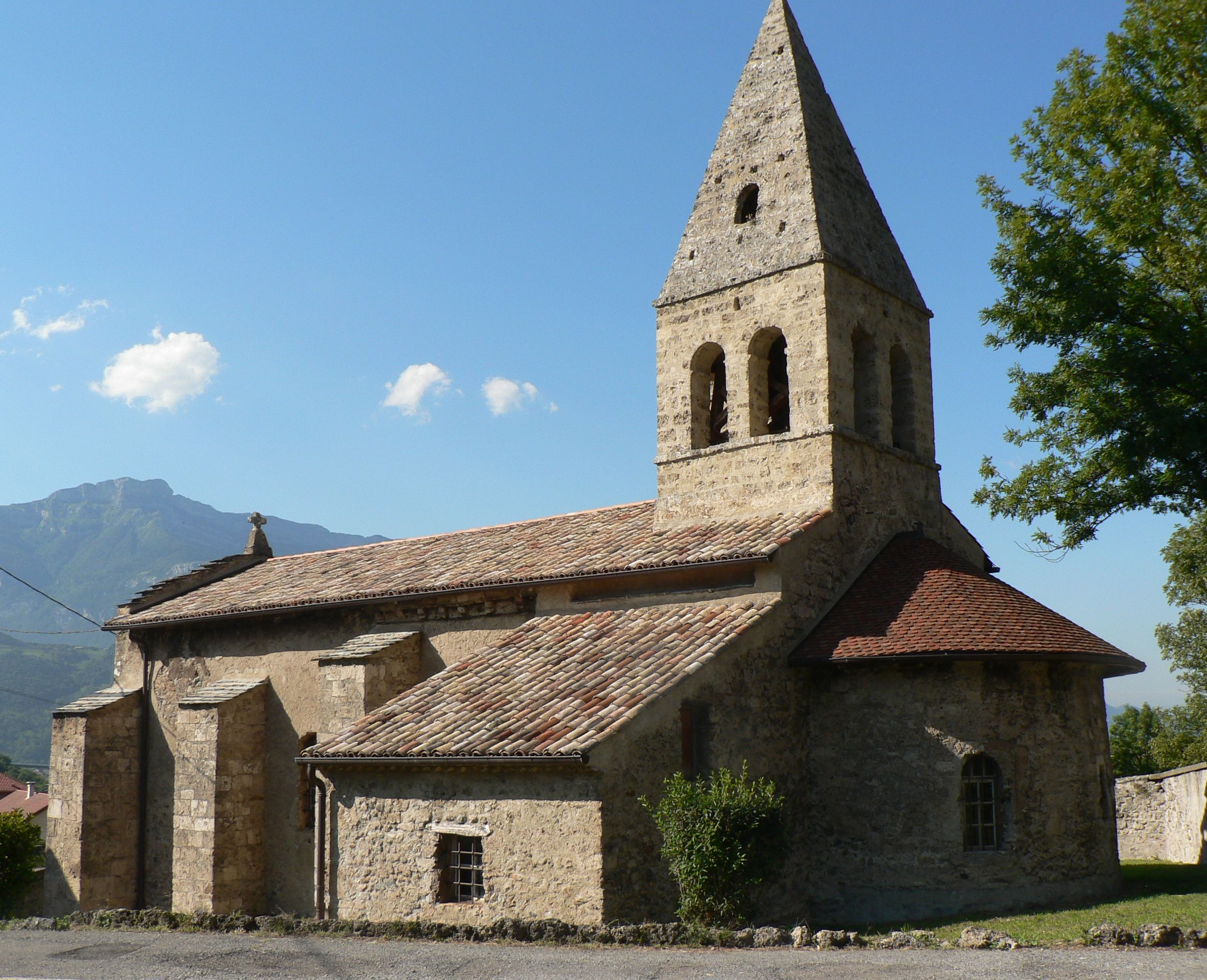
- The church of Saint-Georges
- Location of Saint-Georges-de-Commiers
- Location within France Location within Auvergne-Rhône-Alpes
- Coordinates: 45°01′23″N 5°43′44″E
- Country: France
- Region: Auvergne-Rhône-Alpes
- Department: Isère
- Arrondissement: Grenoble
- Canton: Le Pont-de-Claix
- Intercommunality: Grenoble-Alpes Métropole

Government
  - Mayor (2020–2026): Norbert Grimoud
- Area^{1}: 14.62 km^{2} (5.64 sq mi)
- Elevation: 350 m (1,150 ft)
- Highest elevation: 1,370 m (4,490 ft)
- Lowest elevation: 286 m (938 ft)
- Population (2023): 2,699
  - Density: 184.6/km^{2} (478.1/sq mi)
- Time zone: UTC+01:00 (CET)
  - Summer (DST): UTC+02:00 (CEST)
- INSEE/Postal code: 38388 /38450
- ^{1} French Land Register data, which excludes lakes, ponds, glaciers > 1 km^{2} (0.386 sq mi or 247 acres) and river estuaries.

Saint-Georges-de-Commiers (French pronunciation: [sɛ̃ ʒˈɔʁʒ də kɔmjˈe]) is a commune in the Isère department in southeastern France. It is situated 20 km south of Grenoble.

== Population ==
Historical population

Year	Pop.	±% p.a.
1793	458	—
1821	606	+1.01%
1846	660	+0.34%
1872	582	−0.48%
1901	781	+1.02%
1926	657	−0.69%
1946	600	−0.45%
1962	1,073	+3.70%
1968	816	−4.46%

Year	Pop.	±% p.a.
1975	892	+1.28%
1982	1,276	+5.25%
1990	1,679	+3.49%
1999	1,887	+1.31%
2007	2,013	+0.81%
2012	2,110	+0.95%
2017	2,276	+1.53%
2023	2,699	+2.88%

Source: EHESS and INSEE (1968-2023)

== Sights ==
The small primitive Roman-style church of Saint-Georges was donated by Saint Hugues aux Chanoines d'Oulx in 1080. Its original aspects have endured the test of time. The arched porch has been preserved, as has the squared bell tower, which has two arched windows, and is capped with a tall spire. It was classified as a historical monument in 1908.

== See also ==
- Communes of the Isère department
