= Varces-Allières-et-Risset =

- Commune
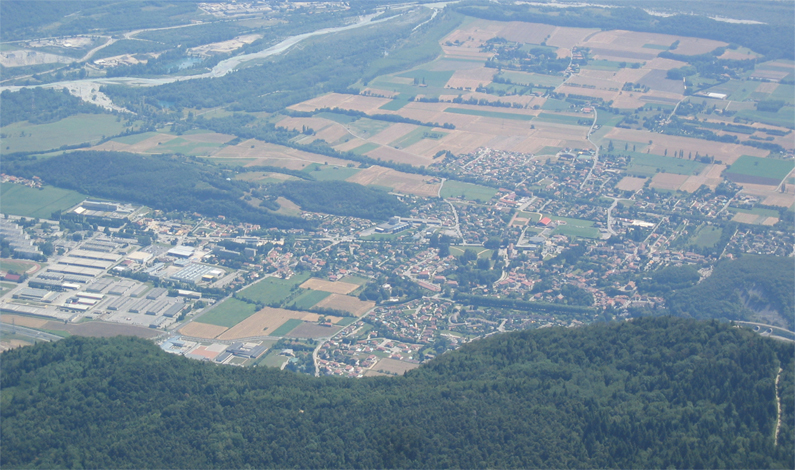
- Seen from the Pic St. Michel
- Location of Varces-Allières-et-Risset
- Location within France Location within Auvergne-Rhône-Alpes
- Coordinates: 45°05′15″N 5°37′40″E
- Country: France
- Region: Auvergne-Rhône-Alpes
- Department: Isère
- Arrondissement: Grenoble
- Canton: Le Pont-de-Claix
- Intercommunality: Grenoble-Alpes Métropole

Government
  - Mayor (2020–2026): Jean-Luc Corbet
- Area^{1}: 20.88 km^{2} (8.06 sq mi)
- Highest elevation: 1,960 m (6,430 ft)
- Lowest elevation: 247 m (810 ft)
- Population (2023): 8,542
  - Density: 409.1/km^{2} (1,060/sq mi)
- Time zone: UTC+01:00 (CET)
  - Summer (DST): UTC+02:00 (CEST)
- INSEE/Postal code: 38524 /38760
- ^{1} French Land Register data, which excludes lakes, ponds, glaciers > 1 km^{2} (0.386 sq mi or 247 acres) and river estuaries.

Varces-Allières-et-Risset (French pronunciation: [vaʁs aljɛʁ e ʁisɛ]; Arpitan: Varse-Aliéres-et-Riosèc) is a commune in the Isère department in southeastern France. It is part of the Grenoble urban unit (agglomeration). It was created in 1955 by the merger of the former communes Varces and Allières-et-Risset.

== Population ==
The population data given in the table below for 1954 and earlier refer to the former commune of Varces.

Historical population

Year	Pop.	±% p.a.
1793	637	—
1800	512	−3.07%
1806	670	+4.58%
1821	735	+0.62%
1831	722	−0.18%
1836	742	+0.55%
1841	745	+0.08%
1846	788	+1.13%
1851	733	−1.44%
1856	762	+0.78%
1861	738	−0.64%
1866	715	−0.63%
1872	678	−0.88%
1876	715	+1.34%
1881	703	−0.34%
1886	729	+0.73%
1891	720	−0.25%
1896	690	−0.85%
1901	621	−2.09%

Year	Pop.	±% p.a.
1906	615	−0.19%
1911	611	−0.13%
1921	586	−0.42%
1926	591	+0.17%
1931	675	+2.69%
1936	577	−3.09%
1946	639	+1.03%
1954	808	+2.98%
1962	2,152	+13.03%
1968	2,296	+1.09%
1975	2,809	+2.92%
1982	3,576	+3.51%
1990	4,592	+3.18%
1999	5,341	+1.69%
2007	6,609	+2.70%
2012	6,583	−0.08%
2017	8,250	+4.62%
2023	8,542	+0.58%

Source: EHESS and INSEE (1968-2023)

== See also ==
- Parc naturel régional du Vercors
