= Quaix-en-Chartreuse =

- Commune
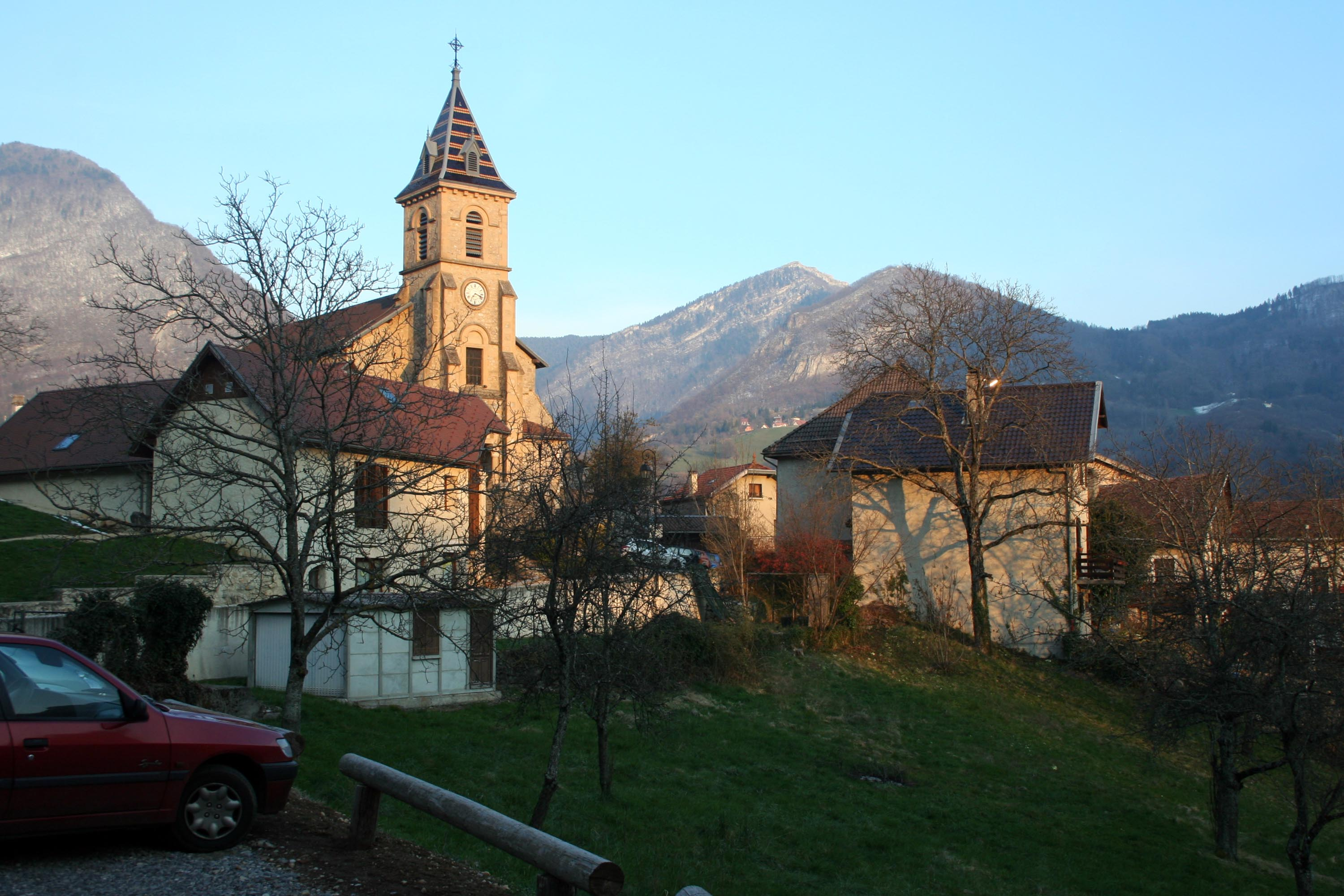
- The church of Quaix-en-Chartreuse
- Location of Quaix-en-Chartreuse
- Location within France Location within Auvergne-Rhône-Alpes
- Coordinates: 45°15′13″N 5°43′10″E
- Country: France
- Region: Auvergne-Rhône-Alpes
- Department: Isère
- Arrondissement: Grenoble
- Canton: Grenoble-2
- Intercommunality: Grenoble-Alpes Métropole

Government
  - Mayor (2020–2026): Pierre Faure
- Area^{1}: 18.09 km^{2} (6.98 sq mi)
- Elevation: 525 m (1,722 ft)
- Highest elevation: 1,689 m (5,541 ft)
- Lowest elevation: 270 m (890 ft)
- Population (2023): 943
  - Density: 52.1/km^{2} (135/sq mi)
- Time zone: UTC+01:00 (CET)
  - Summer (DST): UTC+02:00 (CEST)
- INSEE/Postal code: 38328 /38950
- ^{1} French Land Register data, which excludes lakes, ponds, glaciers > 1 km^{2} (0.386 sq mi or 247 acres) and river estuaries.

Quaix-en-Chartreuse (French pronunciation: [kɛ ɑ̃ ʃaʁtʁøz], lit. 'Quaix in Chartreuse') is a commune in the Isère department in southeastern France.

== Population ==
Historical population
Year	Pop.	±% p.a.
1968	306	—
1975	268	−1.88%
1982	415	+6.45%
1990	608	+4.89%
1999	740	+2.21%
2007	886	+2.28%
2012	920	+0.76%
2017	893	−0.59%
2023	943	+0.91%
Source: INSEE

== See also ==
- Communes of the Isère department
- Néron (Isère)
