= Sarcenas =

- Commune
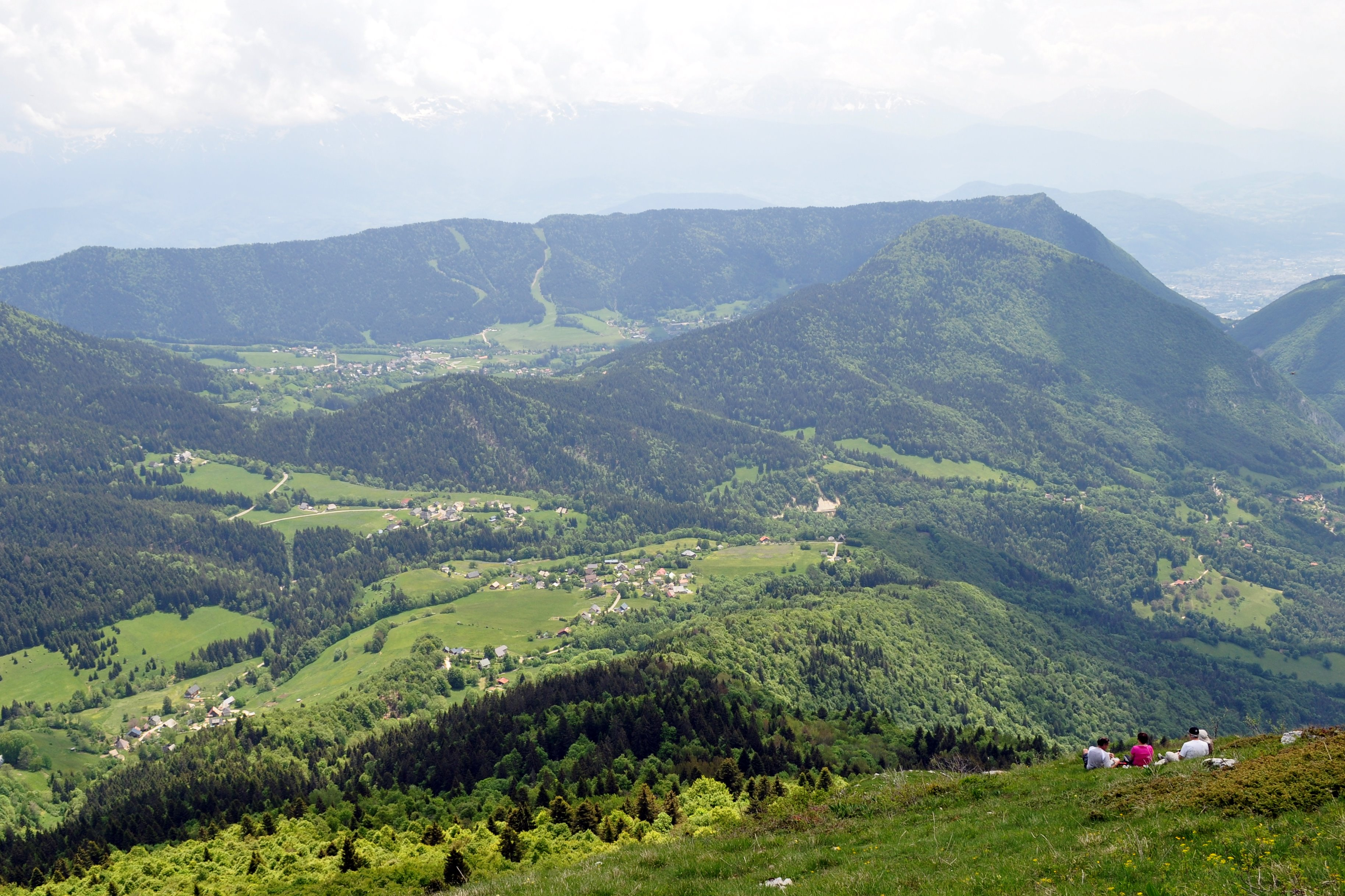
- A general view of Sarcenas
- Location of Sarcenas
- Location within France Location within Auvergne-Rhône-Alpes
- Coordinates: 45°16′29″N 5°45′31″E
- Country: France
- Region: Auvergne-Rhône-Alpes
- Department: Isère
- Arrondissement: Grenoble
- Canton: Grenoble-2
- Intercommunality: Grenoble-Alpes Métropole

Government
  - Mayor (2020–2026): Sylvain Duloutre
- Area^{1}: 8 km^{2} (3.1 sq mi)
- Elevation: 1,100 m (3,600 ft)
- Highest elevation: 2,079 m (6,821 ft)
- Lowest elevation: 892 m (2,927 ft)
- Population (2023): 261
  - Density: 33/km^{2} (84/sq mi)
- Time zone: UTC+01:00 (CET)
  - Summer (DST): UTC+02:00 (CEST)
- INSEE/Postal code: 38472 /38700
- ^{1} French Land Register data, which excludes lakes, ponds, glaciers > 1 km^{2} (0.386 sq mi or 247 acres) and river estuaries.

Sarcenas (French pronunciation: [saʁsəna]) is a commune in the Isère department in southeastern France.

== Population ==
Historical population
Year	Pop.	±% p.a.
1968	80	—
1975	90	+1.70%
1982	98	+1.22%
1990	128	+3.39%
1999	141	+1.08%
2007	187	+3.59%
2012	200	+1.35%
2017	189	−1.13%
2023	261	+5.53%
Source: INSEE

== See also ==
- Communes of the Isère department
