= Saint-Égrève =

- Commune
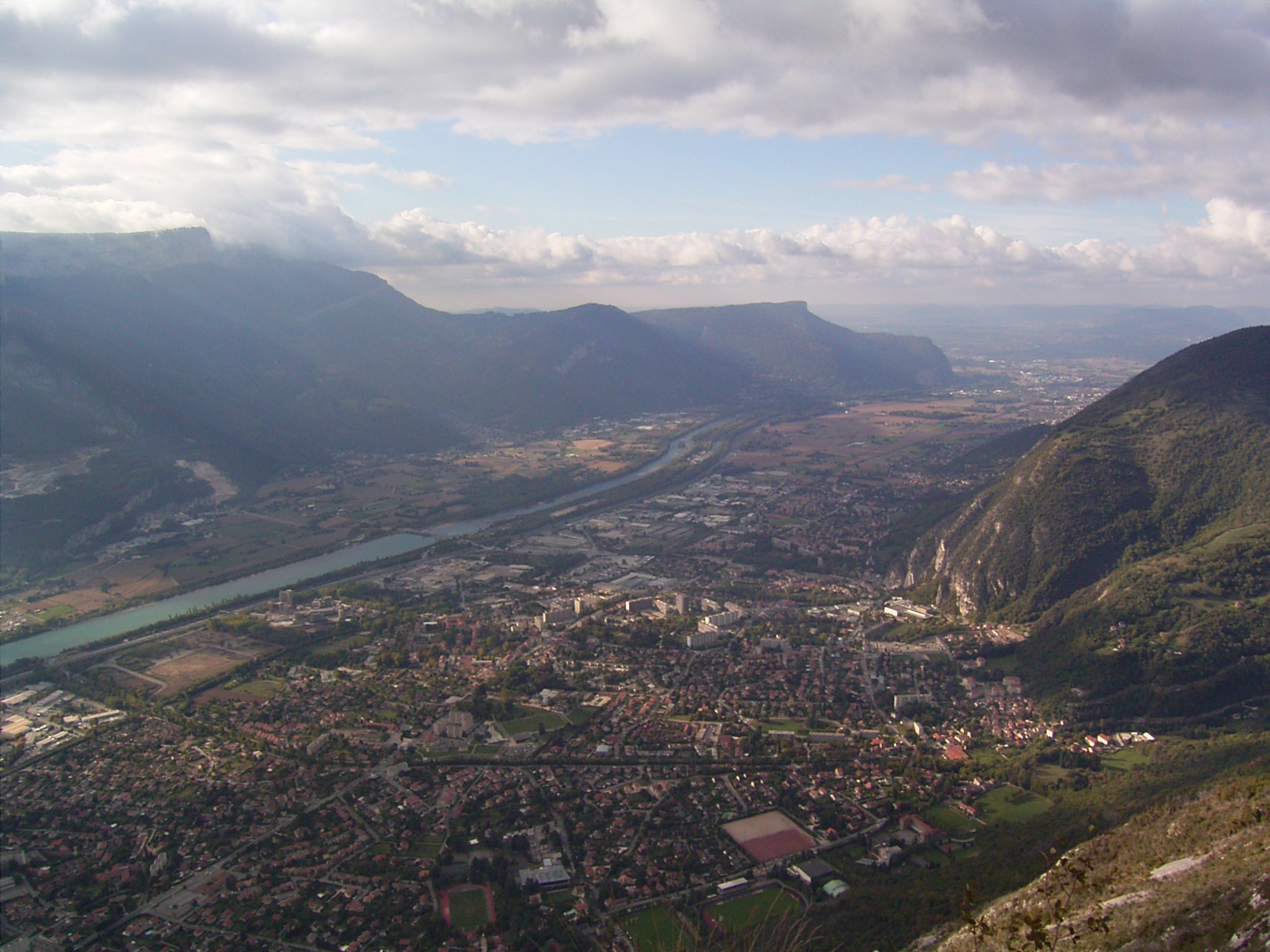
- A general view of Saint-Égrève
- Location of Saint-Égrève
- Location within France Location within Auvergne-Rhône-Alpes
- Coordinates: 45°13′57″N 5°41′01″E
- Country: France
- Region: Auvergne-Rhône-Alpes
- Department: Isère
- Arrondissement: Grenoble
- Canton: Grenoble-2
- Intercommunality: Grenoble-Alpes Métropole

Government
  - Mayor (2020–2026): Laurent Amadieu
- Area^{1}: 11 km^{2} (4.2 sq mi)
- Elevation: 202 m (663 ft)
- Highest elevation: 1,299 m (4,262 ft)
- Lowest elevation: 198 m (650 ft)
- Population (2023): 17,986
  - Density: 1,600/km^{2} (4,200/sq mi)
- Time zone: UTC+01:00 (CET)
  - Summer (DST): UTC+02:00 (CEST)
- INSEE/Postal code: 38382 /38120
- ^{1} French Land Register data, which excludes lakes, ponds, glaciers > 1 km^{2} (0.386 sq mi or 247 acres) and river estuaries.

Saint-Égrève (French pronunciation: [sɛ̃.t‿eɡʁˈɛv]; Arpitan: Sant-Ègrèvo) is a commune in the Isère department in southeastern France. It is part of the Grenoble urban unit (agglomeration).

== Population ==
Historical population

Year	Pop.	±% p.a.
1793	620	—
1800	852	+4.65%
1806	789	−1.27%
1821	1,185	+2.75%
1831	1,240	+0.45%
1836	1,222	−0.29%
1841	1,273	+0.82%
1846	1,372	+1.51%
1851	1,269	−1.55%
1856	1,271	+0.03%
1861	1,587	+4.54%
1866	1,761	+2.10%
1872	1,883	+1.12%
1876	2,083	+2.56%
1881	2,301	+2.01%
1886	2,523	+1.86%
1891	2,507	−0.13%
1896	2,575	+0.54%
1901	2,660	+0.65%

Year	Pop.	±% p.a.
1906	2,674	+0.11%
1911	2,997	+2.31%
1921	3,013	+0.05%
1926	3,273	+1.67%
1931	3,628	+2.08%
1936	3,910	+1.51%
1946	3,250	−1.83%
1954	4,305	+3.58%
1962	7,641	+7.44%
1968	11,445	+6.97%
1975	14,246	+3.18%
1982	14,363	+0.12%
1990	15,891	+1.27%
1999	15,517	−0.26%
2007	15,432	−0.07%
2012	16,176	+0.95%
2017	15,838	−0.42%
2023	17,986	+2.14%

Source: EHESS and INSEE (1968-2023)

== Twin towns – sister cities ==
Saint-Égrève is twinned with:

- Karben, Germany, since 1974
- Mińsk Mazowiecki, Poland, since 1991
- Krnov, Czech Republic, since 1991
- Telšiai, Lithuania
