= La Penne-sur-l'Ouvèze =

- Commune
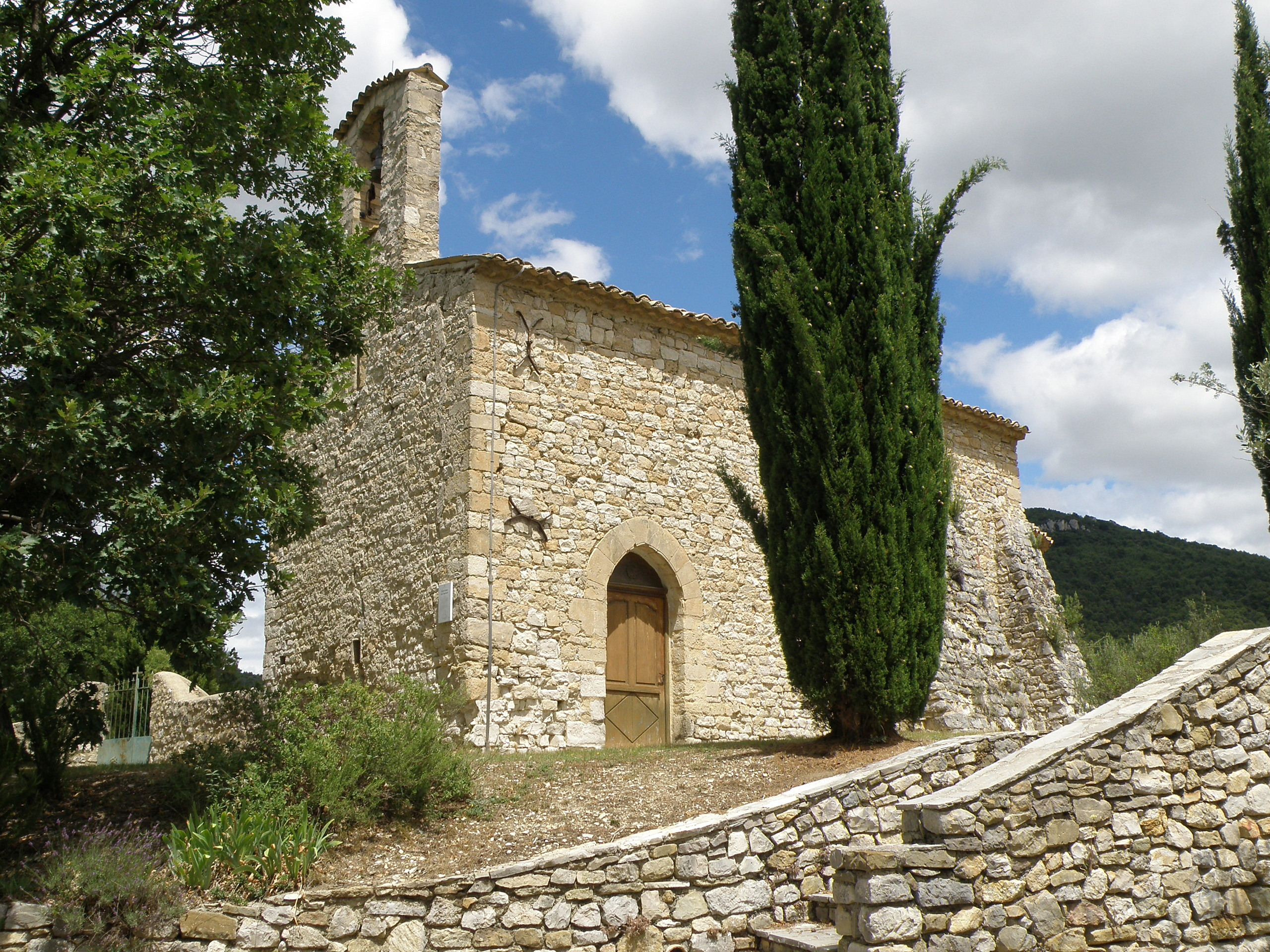
- Notre-Dame-des-Aspirants chapel
- Location of La Penne-sur-l'Ouvèze
- Location within France Location within Auvergne-Rhône-Alpes
- Coordinates: 44°15′37″N 5°13′31″E
- Country: France
- Region: Auvergne-Rhône-Alpes
- Department: Drôme
- Arrondissement: Nyons
- Canton: Nyons et Baronnies

Government
  - Mayor (2020–2026): Jérôme Bompard
- Area^{1}: 7.32 km^{2} (2.83 sq mi)
- Highest elevation: 1,041 m (3,415 ft)
- Lowest elevation: 296 m (971 ft)
- Population (2023): 82
  - Density: 11/km^{2} (29/sq mi)
- Time zone: UTC+01:00 (CET)
  - Summer (DST): UTC+02:00 (CEST)
- INSEE/Postal code: 26229 /26170
- ^{1} French Land Register data, which excludes lakes, ponds, glaciers > 1 km^{2} (0.386 sq mi or 247 acres) and river estuaries.

La Penne-sur-l'Ouvèze (French pronunciation: [la pɛn syʁ luvɛz]; Occitan: La Pena) is a commune in the Drôme department in southeastern France.

== Population ==
Historical population
Year	Pop.	±% p.a.
1968	45	—
1975	54	+2.64%
1982	80	+5.78%
1990	78	−0.32%
1999	88	+1.35%
2007	95	+0.96%
2012	98	+0.62%
2017	96	−0.41%
2023	82	−2.59%
Source: INSEE

== See also ==
- Communes of the Drôme department
