= Valouse =

- Commune
- Location of Valouse
- Location within France Location within Auvergne-Rhône-Alpes
- Coordinates: 44°27′47″N 5°11′31″E
- Country: France
- Region: Auvergne-Rhône-Alpes
- Department: Drôme
- Arrondissement: Nyons
- Canton: Nyons et Baronnies

Government
  - Mayor (2020–2026): Janine Amar
- Area^{1}: 6.33 km^{2} (2.44 sq mi)
- Elevation: 816 m (2,677 ft)
- Highest elevation: 1,320 m (4,330 ft)
- Lowest elevation: 512 m (1,680 ft)
- Population (2023): 41
  - Density: 6.5/km^{2} (17/sq mi)
- Time zone: UTC+01:00 (CET)
  - Summer (DST): UTC+02:00 (CEST)
- INSEE/Postal code: 26363 /26110
- ^{1} French Land Register data, which excludes lakes, ponds, glaciers > 1 km^{2} (0.386 sq mi or 247 acres) and river estuaries.

Valouse (French pronunciation: [valuz]; Occitan: Valosa) is a commune in the Drôme department in southeastern France.

== Population ==
Historical population
Year	Pop.	±% p.a.
1968	7	—
1975	9	+3.66%
1982	18	+10.41%
1990	25	+4.19%
1999	36	+4.13%
2007	42	+1.95%
2012	38	−1.98%
2017	36	−1.08%
2023	41	+2.19%
Source: INSEE

== See also ==
- Communes of the Drôme department
