= Montguers =

- Commune
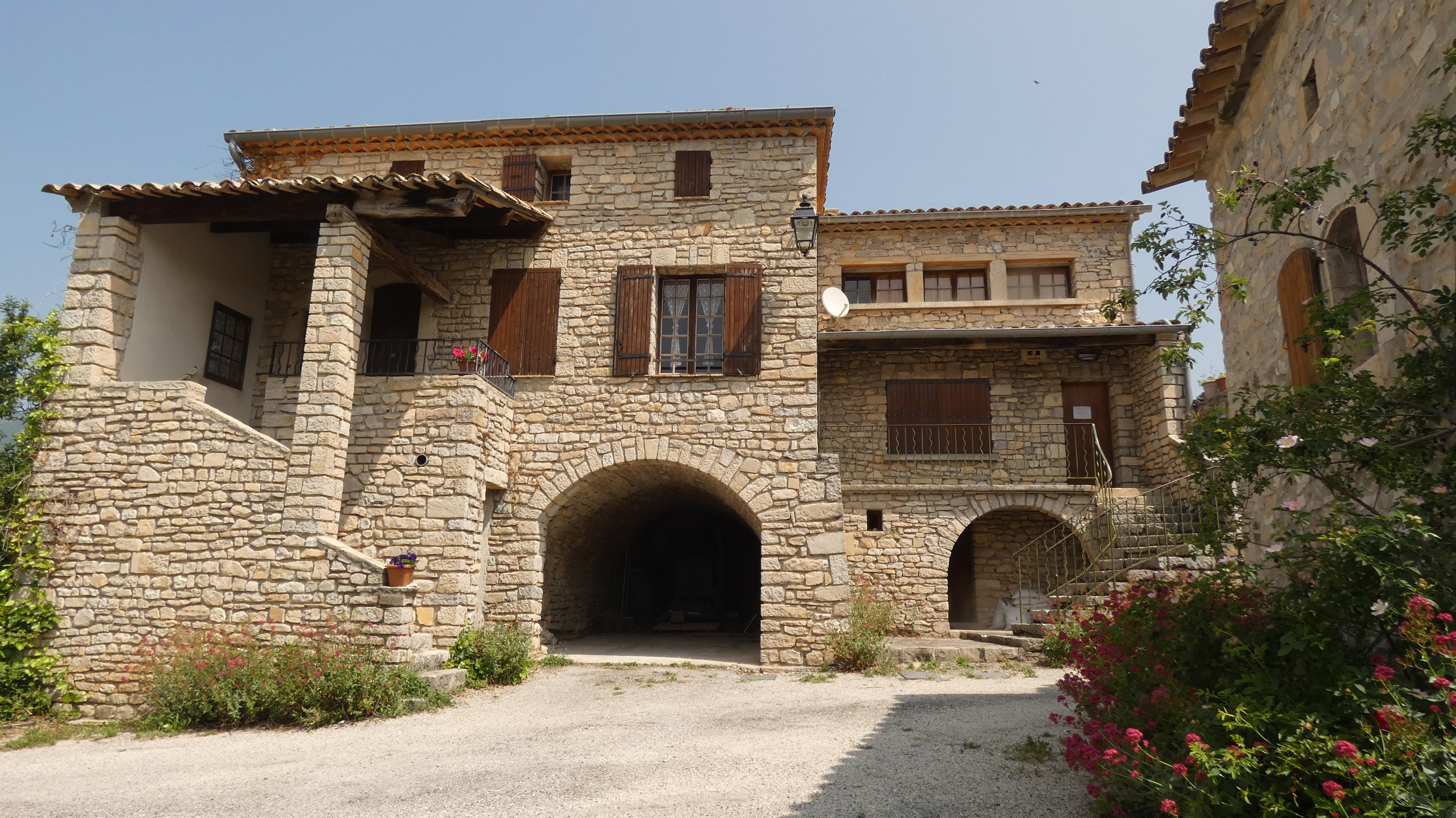
- Montguers Town hall
- Location of Montguers
- Location within France Location within Auvergne-Rhône-Alpes
- Coordinates: 44°17′00″N 5°27′00″E
- Country: France
- Region: Auvergne-Rhône-Alpes
- Department: Drôme
- Arrondissement: Nyons
- Canton: Nyons et Baronnies

Government
  - Mayor (2020–2026): Géraud Bontoux
- Area^{1}: 11.06 km^{2} (4.27 sq mi)
- Highest elevation: 1,217 m (3,993 ft)
- Lowest elevation: 639 m (2,096 ft)
- Population (2023): 39
  - Density: 3.5/km^{2} (9.1/sq mi)
- Time zone: UTC+01:00 (CET)
  - Summer (DST): UTC+02:00 (CEST)
- INSEE/Postal code: 26201 /26170
- ^{1} French Land Register data, which excludes lakes, ponds, glaciers > 1 km^{2} (0.386 sq mi or 247 acres) and river estuaries.

Montguers is a commune in the Drôme department in southeastern France.

== Population ==
Historical population
Year	Pop.	±% p.a.
1968	39	—
1975	58	+5.83%
1982	56	−0.50%
1990	50	−1.41%
1999	55	+1.06%
2007	58	+0.67%
2012	48	−3.71%
2017	45	−1.28%
2023	39	−2.36%
Source: INSEE

== See also ==
- Communes of the Drôme department
