= Canton of Nyons et Baronnies =

Coordinates: 44.36°N 5.14°E

The canton of Nyons et Baronnies is an administrative division of the Drôme department, southeastern France. It was created at the French canton reorganisation which came into effect in March 2015. Its seat is in Nyons.

It consists of the following communes:

1. Arpavon
2. Aubres
3. Aulan
4. Ballons
5. Barret-de-Lioure
6. Beauvoisin
7. Bellecombe-Tarendol
8. Bénivay-Ollon
9. Bésignan
10. Buis-les-Baronnies
11. La Charce
12. Châteauneuf-de-Bordette
13. Chaudebonne
14. Chauvac-Laux-Montaux
15. Condorcet
16. Cornillac
17. Cornillon-sur-l'Oule
18. Curnier
19. Eygalayes
20. Eygaliers
21. Eyroles
22. Ferrassières
23. Izon-la-Bruisse
24. Laborel
25. Lachau
26. Lemps
27. Mérindol-les-Oliviers
28. Mévouillon
29. Mirabel-aux-Baronnies
30. Mollans-sur-Ouvèze
31. Montauban-sur-l'Ouvèze
32. Montaulieu
33. Montbrun-les-Bains
34. Montferrand-la-Fare
35. Montfroc
36. Montguers
37. Montréal-les-Sources
38. Nyons
39. Pelonne
40. La Penne-sur-l'Ouvèze
41. Piégon
42. Pierrelongue
43. Les Pilles
44. Plaisians
45. Le Poët-en-Percip
46. Le Poët-Sigillat
47. Pommerol
48. Propiac
49. Reilhanette
50. Rémuzat
51. Rioms
52. Rochebrune
53. La Roche-sur-le-Buis
54. La Rochette-du-Buis
55. Roussieux
56. Sahune
57. Saint-Auban-sur-l'Ouvèze
58. Sainte-Euphémie-sur-Ouvèze
59. Sainte-Jalle
60. Saint-Ferréol-Trente-Pas
61. Saint-Maurice-sur-Eygues
62. Saint-May
63. Saint-Sauveur-Gouvernet
64. Séderon
65. Valouse
66. Venterol
67. Verclause
68. Vercoiran
69. Vers-sur-Méouge
70. Villebois-les-Pins
71. Villefranche-le-Château
72. Villeperdrix
73. Vinsobres
