= Villebois-les-Pins =

- Commune
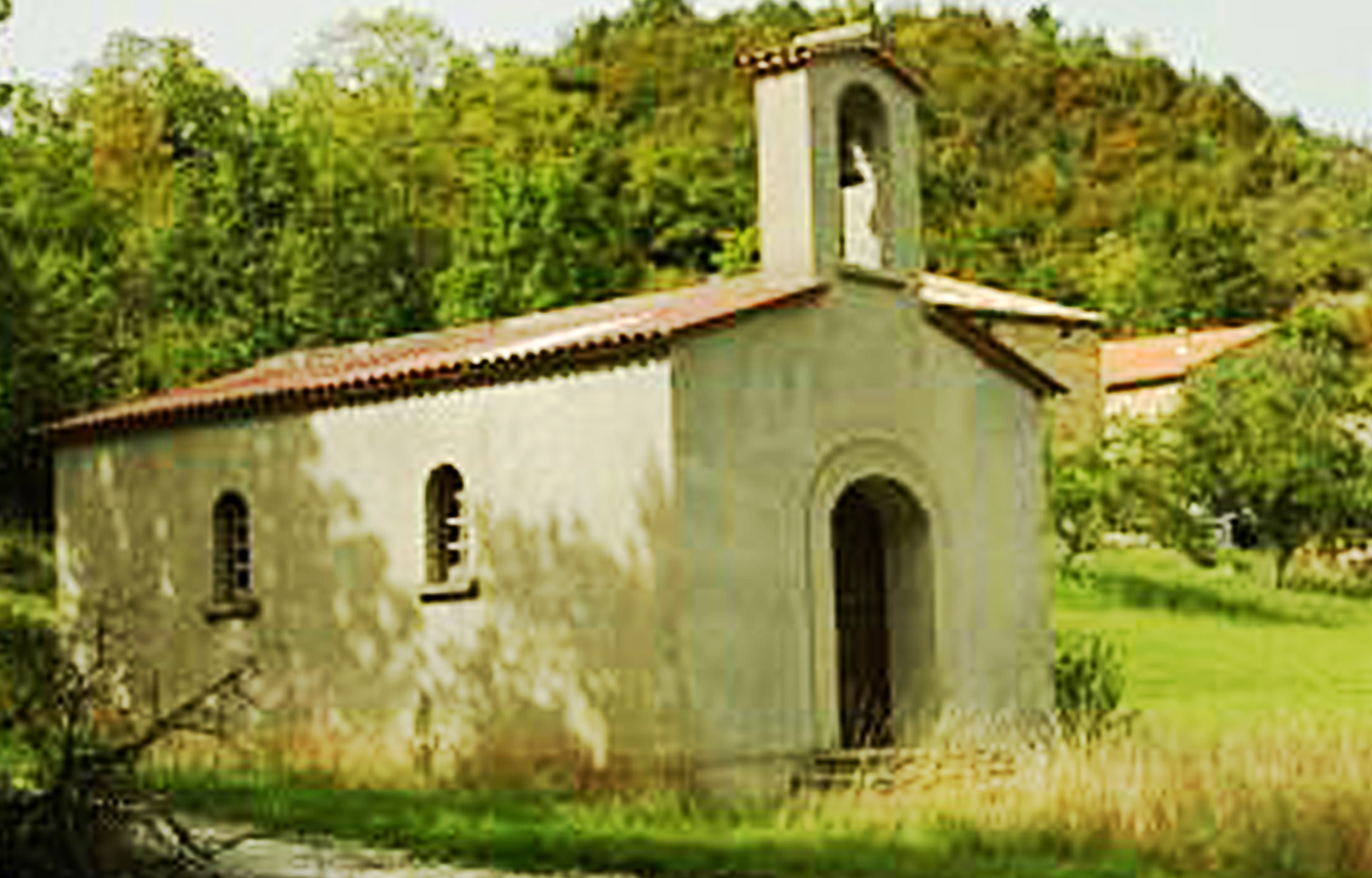
- The church of Villebois-les-Pins
- Location of Villebois-les-Pins
- Location within France Location within Auvergne-Rhône-Alpes
- Coordinates: 44°19′01″N 5°36′36″E
- Country: France
- Region: Auvergne-Rhône-Alpes
- Department: Drôme
- Arrondissement: Nyons
- Canton: Nyons et Baronnies
- Intercommunality: Sisteronais-Buëch

Government
  - Mayor (2020–2026): Marianne Roux
- Area^{1}: 10.81 km^{2} (4.17 sq mi)
- Elevation: 855 m (2,805 ft)
- Highest elevation: 1,415 m (4,642 ft)
- Lowest elevation: 792 m (2,598 ft)
- Population (2023): 22
  - Density: 2.0/km^{2} (5.3/sq mi)
- Time zone: UTC+01:00 (CET)
  - Summer (DST): UTC+02:00 (CEST)
- INSEE/Postal code: 26374 /26700
- ^{1} French Land Register data, which excludes lakes, ponds, glaciers > 1 km^{2} (0.386 sq mi or 247 acres) and river estuaries.

Villebois-les-Pins (French pronunciation: [vilbwa le pɛ̃]) is a commune in the Drôme department in southeastern France.

== Population ==
Historical population
Year	Pop.	±% p.a.
1968	20	—
1975	15	−4.03%
1982	11	−4.33%
1990	16	+4.80%
1999	20	+2.51%
2007	18	−1.31%
2012	24	+5.92%
2017	16	−7.79%
2023	22	+5.45%
Source: INSEE

== See also ==
- Communes of the Drôme department
