= Saint-Ferréol-Trente-Pas =

- Commune
- Location of Saint-Ferréol-Trente-Pas
- Location within France Location within Auvergne-Rhône-Alpes
- Coordinates: 44°25′37″N 5°13′05″E
- Country: France
- Region: Auvergne-Rhône-Alpes
- Department: Drôme
- Arrondissement: Nyons
- Canton: Nyons et Baronnies

Government
  - Mayor (2020–2026): Fabienne Barbanson
- Area^{1}: 21.48 km^{2} (8.29 sq mi)
- Elevation: 453 m (1,486 ft)
- Highest elevation: 1,131 m (3,711 ft)
- Lowest elevation: 380 m (1,250 ft)
- Population (2023): 218
  - Density: 10.1/km^{2} (26.3/sq mi)
- Time zone: UTC+01:00 (CET)
  - Summer (DST): UTC+02:00 (CEST)
- INSEE/Postal code: 26304 /26110
- ^{1} French Land Register data, which excludes lakes, ponds, glaciers > 1 km^{2} (0.386 sq mi or 247 acres) and river estuaries.

Saint-Ferréol-Trente-Pas (Vivaro-Alpine: Sant Ferriòu) is a commune in the Drôme department in southeastern France.

== Population ==
Historical population
Year	Pop.	±% p.a.
1968	123	—
1975	124	+0.12%
1982	139	+1.64%
1990	191	+4.05%
1999	212	+1.17%
2007	235	+1.30%
2012	217	−1.58%
2017	258	+3.52%
2023	218	−2.77%
Source: INSEE

== See also ==
- Communes of the Drôme department
