= Bésignan =

- Commune
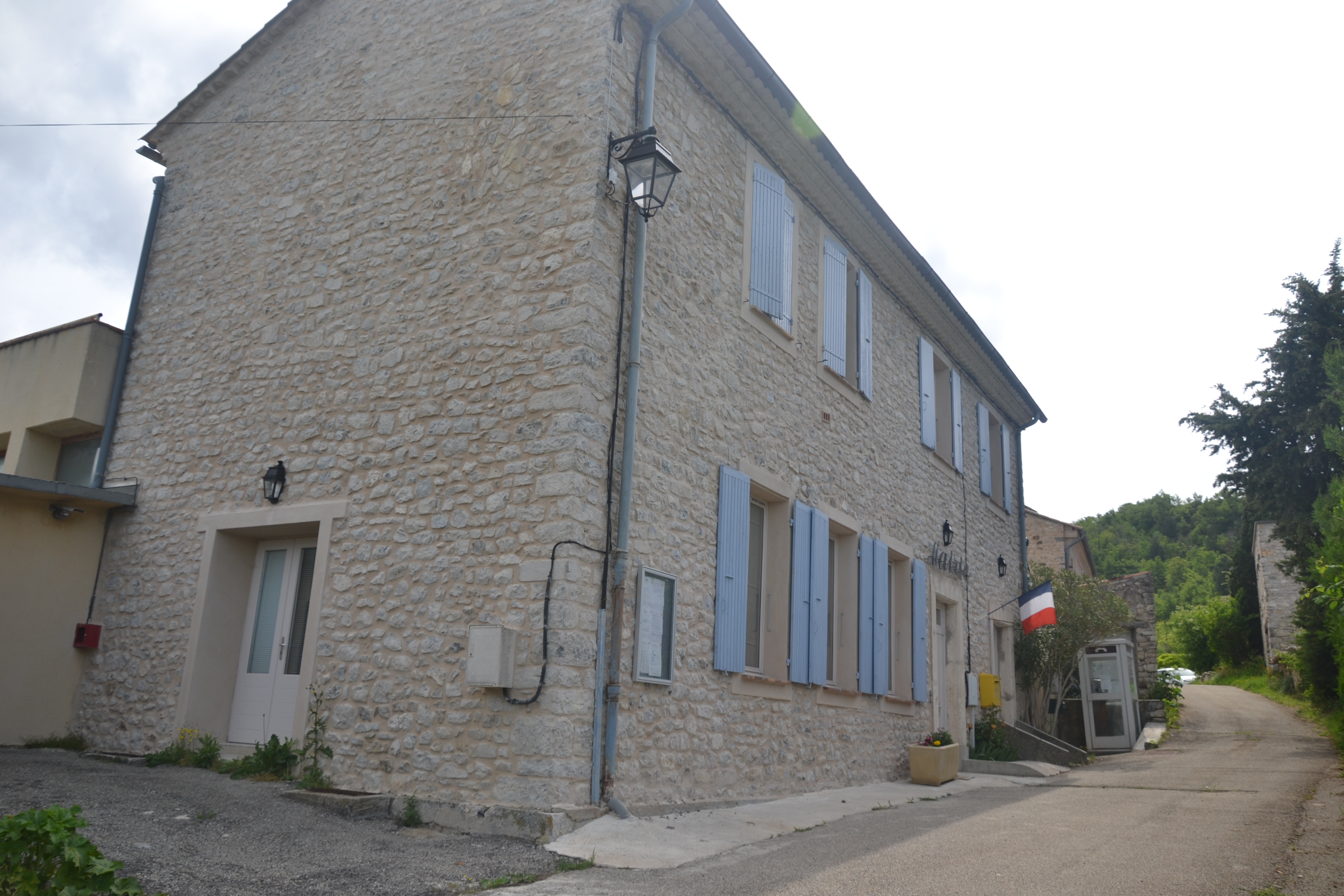
- The town hall in Bésignan

- Coat of arms
- Location of Bésignan
- Location within France Location within Auvergne-Rhône-Alpes
- Coordinates: 44°19′16″N 5°19′33″E
- Country: France
- Region: Auvergne-Rhône-Alpes
- Department: Drôme
- Arrondissement: Nyons
- Canton: Nyons et Baronnies

Government
  - Mayor (2020–2026): José Fernandes
- Area^{1}: 8.94 km^{2} (3.45 sq mi)
- Highest elevation: 963 m (3,159 ft)
- Lowest elevation: 437 m (1,434 ft)
- Population (2023): 76
  - Density: 8.5/km^{2} (22/sq mi)
- Time zone: UTC+01:00 (CET)
  - Summer (DST): UTC+02:00 (CEST)
- INSEE/Postal code: 26050 /26110
- ^{1} French Land Register data, which excludes lakes, ponds, glaciers > 1 km^{2} (0.386 sq mi or 247 acres) and river estuaries.

Bésignan (French pronunciation: [beziɲɑ̃]; Occitan: Besinhan) is a commune in the Drôme department in southeastern France.

== Population ==
Historical population
Year	Pop.	±% p.a.
1968	49	—
1975	44	−1.53%
1982	47	+0.95%
1990	55	+1.98%
1999	69	+2.55%
2007	66	−0.55%
2012	64	−0.61%
2017	82	+5.08%
2023	76	−1.26%
Source: INSEE

== See also ==
- Communes of the Drôme department
