= Cornillon-sur-l'Oule =

- Commune
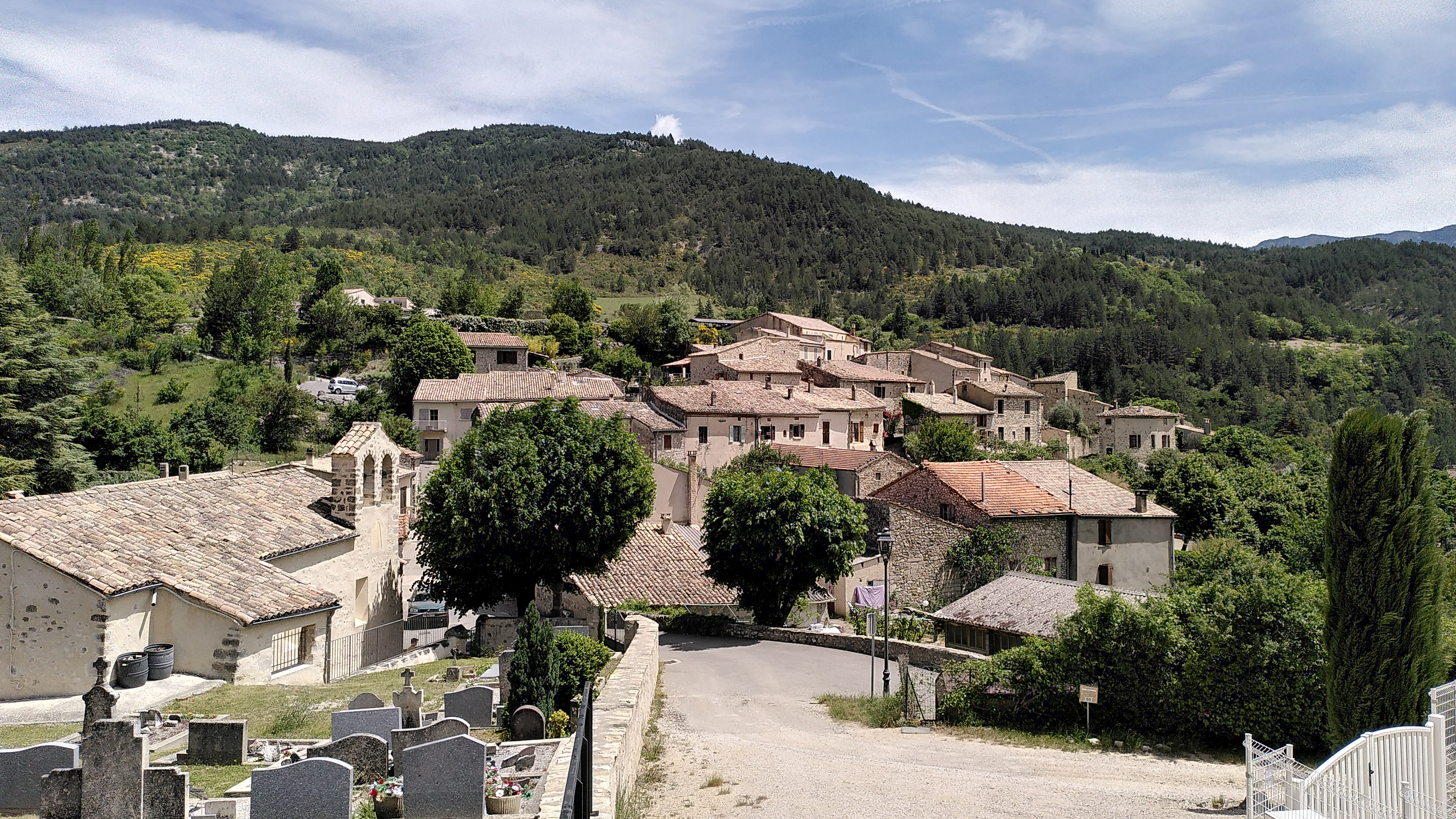
- General view of Cornillon-sur-l'Oule

- Coat of arms
- Location of Cornillon-sur-l'Oule
- Location within France Location within Auvergne-Rhône-Alpes
- Coordinates: 44°27′34″N 5°22′07″E
- Country: France
- Region: Auvergne-Rhône-Alpes
- Department: Drôme
- Arrondissement: Nyons
- Canton: Nyons et Baronnies

Government
  - Mayor (2020–2026): Denis Conil
- Area^{1}: 14.55 km^{2} (5.62 sq mi)
- Highest elevation: 1,223 m (4,012 ft)
- Lowest elevation: 470 m (1,540 ft)
- Population (2023): 75
  - Density: 5.2/km^{2} (13/sq mi)
- Time zone: UTC+01:00 (CET)
  - Summer (DST): UTC+02:00 (CEST)
- INSEE/Postal code: 26105 /26510
- ^{1} French Land Register data, which excludes lakes, ponds, glaciers > 1 km^{2} (0.386 sq mi or 247 acres) and river estuaries.

Cornillon-sur-l'Oule (French pronunciation: [kɔʁnijɔ̃ syʁ lul]; Occitan: Cornilhon) is a commune in the Drôme department in southeastern France.

== Population ==
Historical population
Year	Pop.	±% p.a.
1968	86	—
1975	80	−1.03%
1982	75	−0.92%
1990	68	−1.22%
1999	65	−0.50%
2007	69	+0.75%
2012	76	+1.95%
2017	69	−1.91%
2023	75	+1.40%
Source: INSEE

== See also ==
- Communes of the Drôme department
