= Pelonne =

- Commune
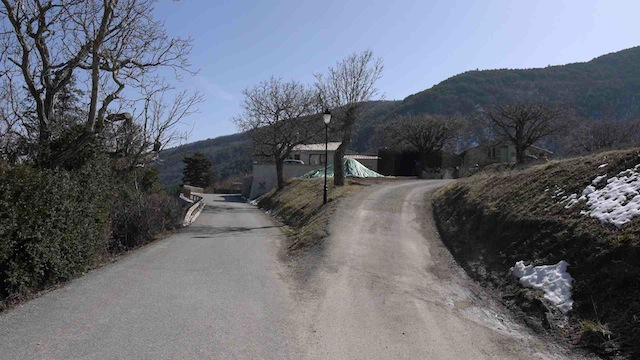
- The road into the village of Pelonne
- Location of Pelonne
- Location within France Location within Auvergne-Rhône-Alpes
- Coordinates: 44°23′02″N 5°23′35″E
- Country: France
- Region: Auvergne-Rhône-Alpes
- Department: Drôme
- Arrondissement: Nyons
- Canton: Nyons et Baronnies

Government
  - Mayor (2020–2026): Mireille Quarlin
- Area^{1}: 2.77 km^{2} (1.07 sq mi)
- Highest elevation: 1,217 m (3,993 ft)
- Lowest elevation: 478 m (1,568 ft)
- Population (2023): 23
  - Density: 8.3/km^{2} (22/sq mi)
- Time zone: UTC+01:00 (CET)
  - Summer (DST): UTC+02:00 (CEST)
- INSEE/Postal code: 26227 /26510
- ^{1} French Land Register data, which excludes lakes, ponds, glaciers > 1 km^{2} (0.386 sq mi or 247 acres) and river estuaries.

Pelonne (French pronunciation: [pəlɔn]; Occitan: Pelòna) is a commune in the Drôme department in southeastern France.

== Population ==
Historical population
Year	Pop.	±% p.a.
1968	19	—
1975	20	+0.74%
1982	19	−0.73%
1990	26	+4.00%
1999	23	−1.35%
2007	19	−2.36%
2012	19	+0.00%
2017	24	+4.78%
2023	23	−0.71%
Source: INSEE

== See also ==
- Communes of the Drôme department
