= Sainte-Euphémie-sur-Ouvèze =

- Commune
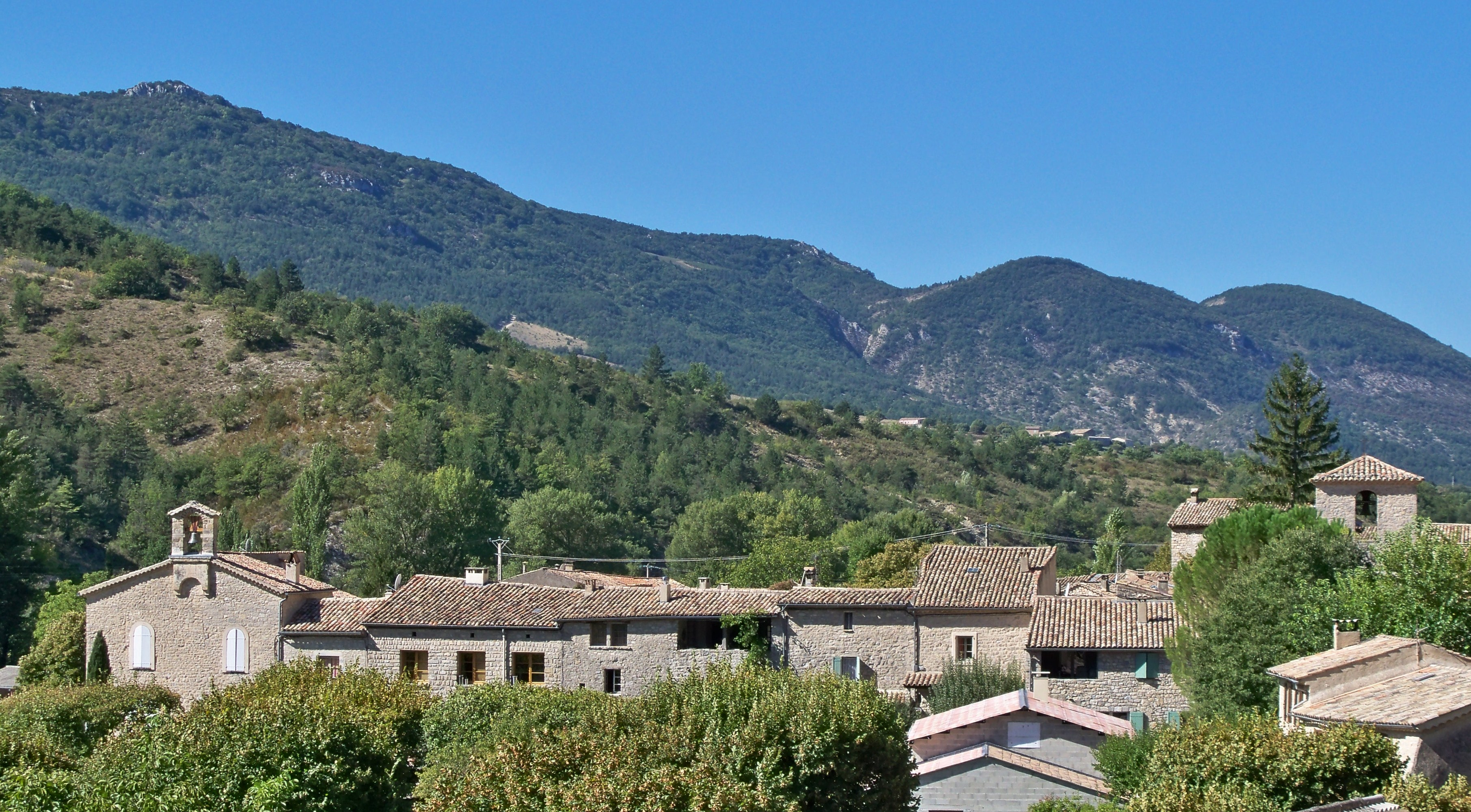
- A view of Sainte-Euphémie-sur-Ouvèze, with the church of Sainte-Euphémie to the right and the Protestant temple to the left
- Location of Sainte-Euphémie-sur-Ouvèze
- Location within France Location within Auvergne-Rhône-Alpes
- Coordinates: 44°18′N 5°18′E
- Country: France
- Region: Auvergne-Rhône-Alpes
- Department: Drôme
- Arrondissement: Nyons
- Canton: Nyons et Baronnies

Government
  - Mayor (2020–2026): Muriel Brédy
- Area^{1}: 11.28 km^{2} (4.36 sq mi)
- Elevation: 565 m (1,854 ft)
- Highest elevation: 1,218 m (3,996 ft)
- Lowest elevation: 528 m (1,732 ft)
- Population (2023): 71
  - Density: 6.3/km^{2} (16/sq mi)
- Time zone: UTC+01:00 (CET)
  - Summer (DST): UTC+02:00 (CEST)
- INSEE/Postal code: 26303 /26170
- ^{1} French Land Register data, which excludes lakes, ponds, glaciers > 1 km^{2} (0.386 sq mi or 247 acres) and river estuaries.

Sainte-Euphémie-sur-Ouvèze (French pronunciation: [sɛ̃t øfemi syʁ uvɛz], literally Sainte-Euphémie on Ouvèze; Occitan: Sant Aufèmie d'Ovèsa) is a commune in the Drôme department in southeastern France.

== Population ==
Historical population
Year	Pop.	±% p.a.
1968	65	—
1975	65	+0.00%
1982	78	+2.64%
1990	61	−3.03%
1999	71	+1.70%
2007	99	+4.24%
2012	84	−3.23%
2017	70	−3.58%
2023	71	+0.24%
Source: INSEE

== See also ==
- Communes of the Drôme department
