= Saint-May =

- Commune
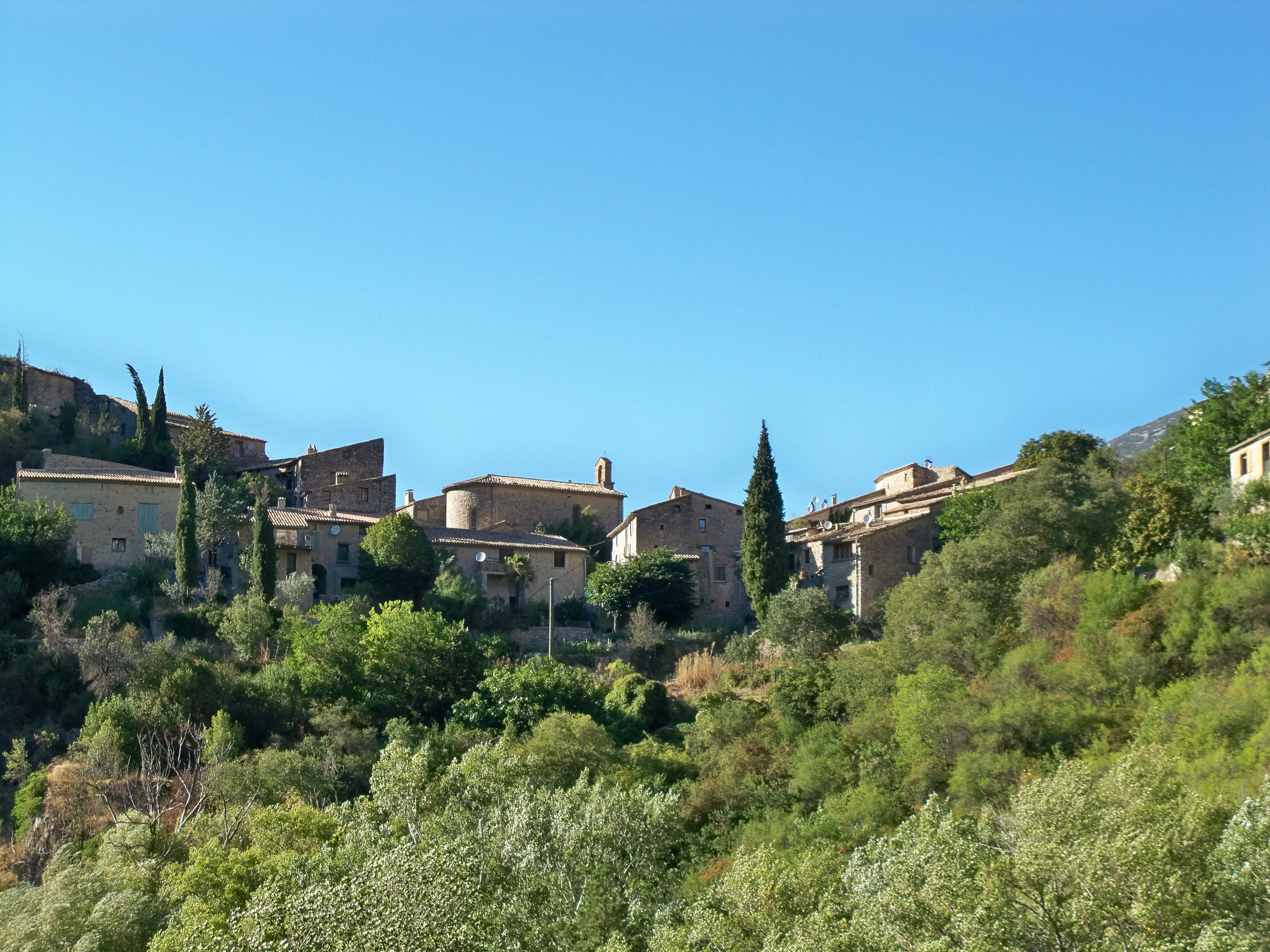
- A general view of Saint-May

- Coat of arms
- Location of Saint-May
- Location within France Location within Auvergne-Rhône-Alpes
- Coordinates: 44°25′37″N 5°19′08″E
- Country: France
- Region: Auvergne-Rhône-Alpes
- Department: Drôme
- Arrondissement: Nyons
- Canton: Nyons et Baronnies

Government
  - Mayor (2020–2026): Alain Labrot
- Area^{1}: 10.23 km^{2} (3.95 sq mi)
- Elevation: 415 m (1,362 ft)
- Highest elevation: 1,173 m (3,848 ft)
- Lowest elevation: 382 m (1,253 ft)
- Population (2023): 32
  - Density: 3.1/km^{2} (8.1/sq mi)
- Time zone: UTC+01:00 (CET)
  - Summer (DST): UTC+02:00 (CEST)
- INSEE/Postal code: 26318 /26510
- ^{1} French Land Register data, which excludes lakes, ponds, glaciers > 1 km^{2} (0.386 sq mi or 247 acres) and river estuaries.

Saint-May (French pronunciation: [sɛ̃ mɛ]; Occitan: Sant Mai) is a commune in the Drôme department in southeastern France.

== Population ==
Historical population
Year	Pop.	±% p.a.
1968	49	—
1975	42	−2.18%
1982	49	+2.23%
1990	44	−1.34%
1999	40	−1.05%
2007	47	+2.04%
2012	42	−2.22%
2017	39	−1.47%
2023	32	−3.24%
Source: INSEE

== See also ==
- Communes of the Drôme department
