= La Rochette-du-Buis =

- Commune
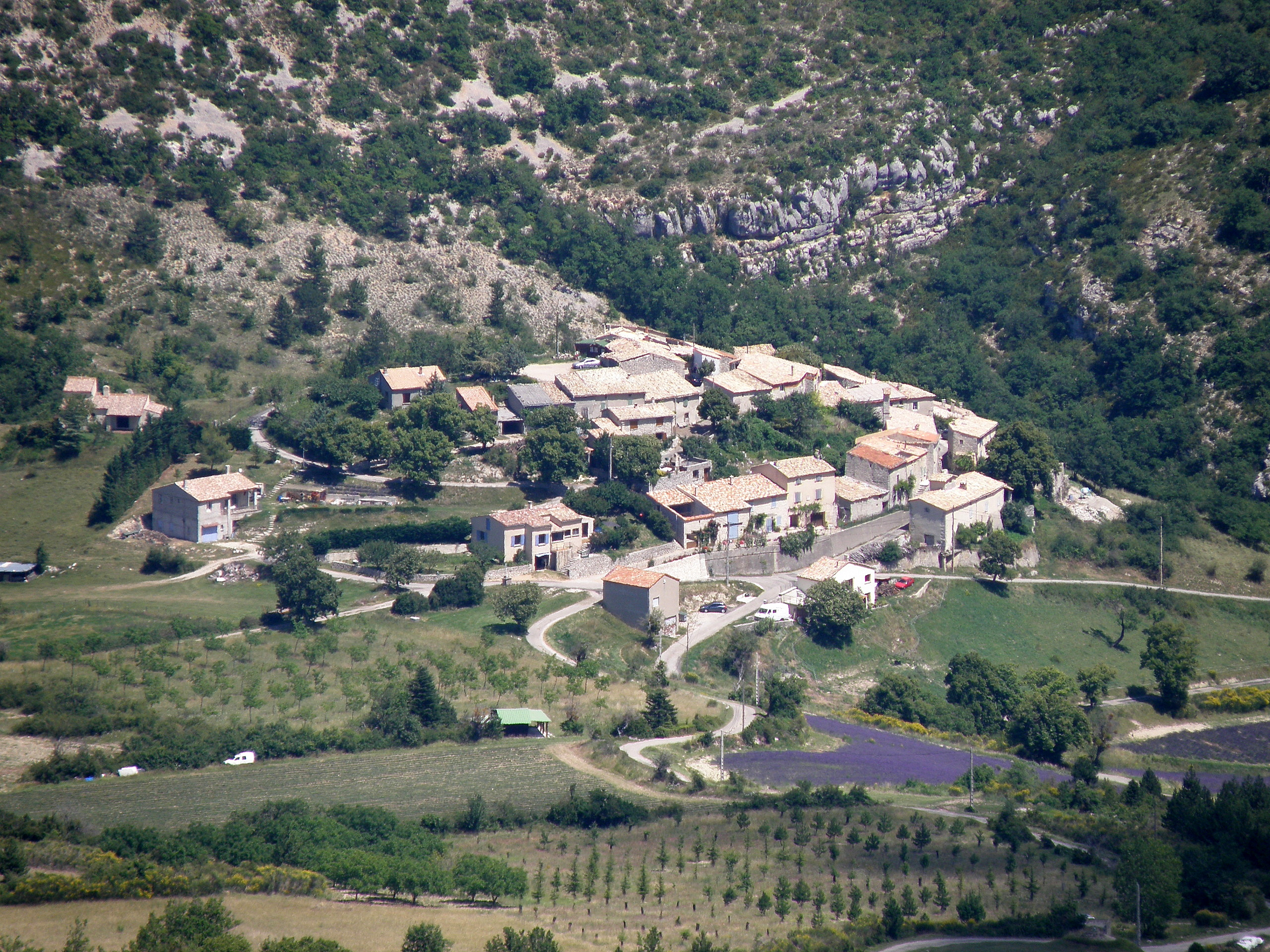
- A general view of La Rochette-du-Buis
- Location of La Rochette-du-Buis
- Location within France Location within Auvergne-Rhône-Alpes
- Coordinates: 44°16′12″N 5°25′16″E
- Country: France
- Region: Auvergne-Rhône-Alpes
- Department: Drôme
- Arrondissement: Nyons
- Canton: Nyons et Baronnies

Government
  - Mayor (2020–2026): Jean-Marc Pelacuer
- Area^{1}: 11.06 km^{2} (4.27 sq mi)
- Elevation: 763 m (2,503 ft)
- Highest elevation: 1,302 m (4,272 ft)
- Lowest elevation: 640 m (2,100 ft)
- Population (2023): 56
  - Density: 5.1/km^{2} (13/sq mi)
- Time zone: UTC+01:00 (CET)
  - Summer (DST): UTC+02:00 (CEST)
- INSEE/Postal code: 26279 /26170
- ^{1} French Land Register data, which excludes lakes, ponds, glaciers > 1 km^{2} (0.386 sq mi or 247 acres) and river estuaries.

La Rochette-du-Buis (French pronunciation: [la ʁɔʃɛt dy bɥi]; Occitan: La Rocheta dau Bois) is a commune in the Drôme department in southeastern France.

== Population ==
Historical population
| Year | Pop. | ±% p.a. |
|---|---|---|
| 1968 | 105 | — |
| 1975 | 63 | −7.04% |
| 1982 | 61 | −0.46% |
| 1990 | 59 | −0.42% |
| 1999 | 65 | +1.08% |
| 2007 | 68 | +0.57% |
| 2012 | 68 | +0.00% |
| 2017 | 72 | +1.15% |
| 2023 | 56 | −4.10% |
Source: INSEE

== See also ==
- Communes of the Drôme department
