= Pierrelongue =

- Commune
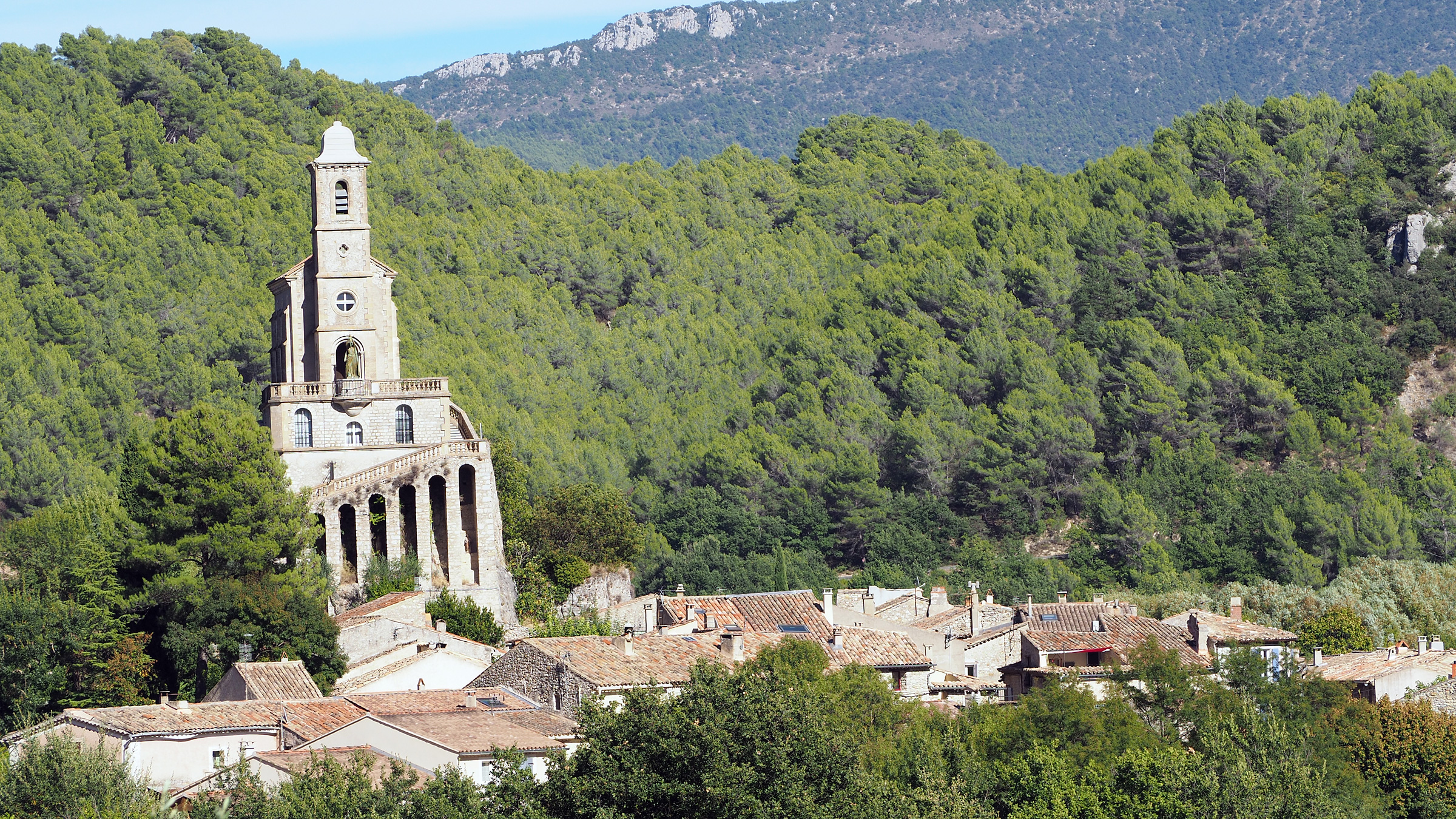
- Pierrelongue and the chapel of Notre-Dame-de-Consolation
- Location of Pierrelongue
- Location within France Location within Auvergne-Rhône-Alpes
- Coordinates: 44°14′47″N 5°13′06″E
- Country: France
- Region: Auvergne-Rhône-Alpes
- Department: Drôme
- Arrondissement: Nyons
- Canton: Nyons et Baronnies

Government
  - Mayor (2020–2026): Gilles Ravoux
- Area^{1}: 5.13 km^{2} (1.98 sq mi)
- Highest elevation: 960 m (3,150 ft)
- Lowest elevation: 293 m (961 ft)
- Population (2023): 231
  - Density: 45.0/km^{2} (117/sq mi)
- Time zone: UTC+01:00 (CET)
  - Summer (DST): UTC+02:00 (CEST)
- INSEE/Postal code: 26236 /26170
- ^{1} French Land Register data, which excludes lakes, ponds, glaciers > 1 km^{2} (0.386 sq mi or 247 acres) and river estuaries.

Pierrelongue (French pronunciation: [pjɛʁlɔ̃ɡ]; Occitan: Pèiralonga) is a commune in the Drôme department in southeastern France.

== Population ==
Historical population
Year	Pop.	±% p.a.
1968	84	—
1975	74	−1.79%
1982	84	+1.83%
1990	104	+2.71%
1999	127	+2.24%
2007	169	+3.64%
2012	243	+7.53%
2017	217	−2.24%
2023	231	+1.05%
Source: INSEE

== See also ==
- Communes of the Drôme department
