= Arpavon =

- Commune
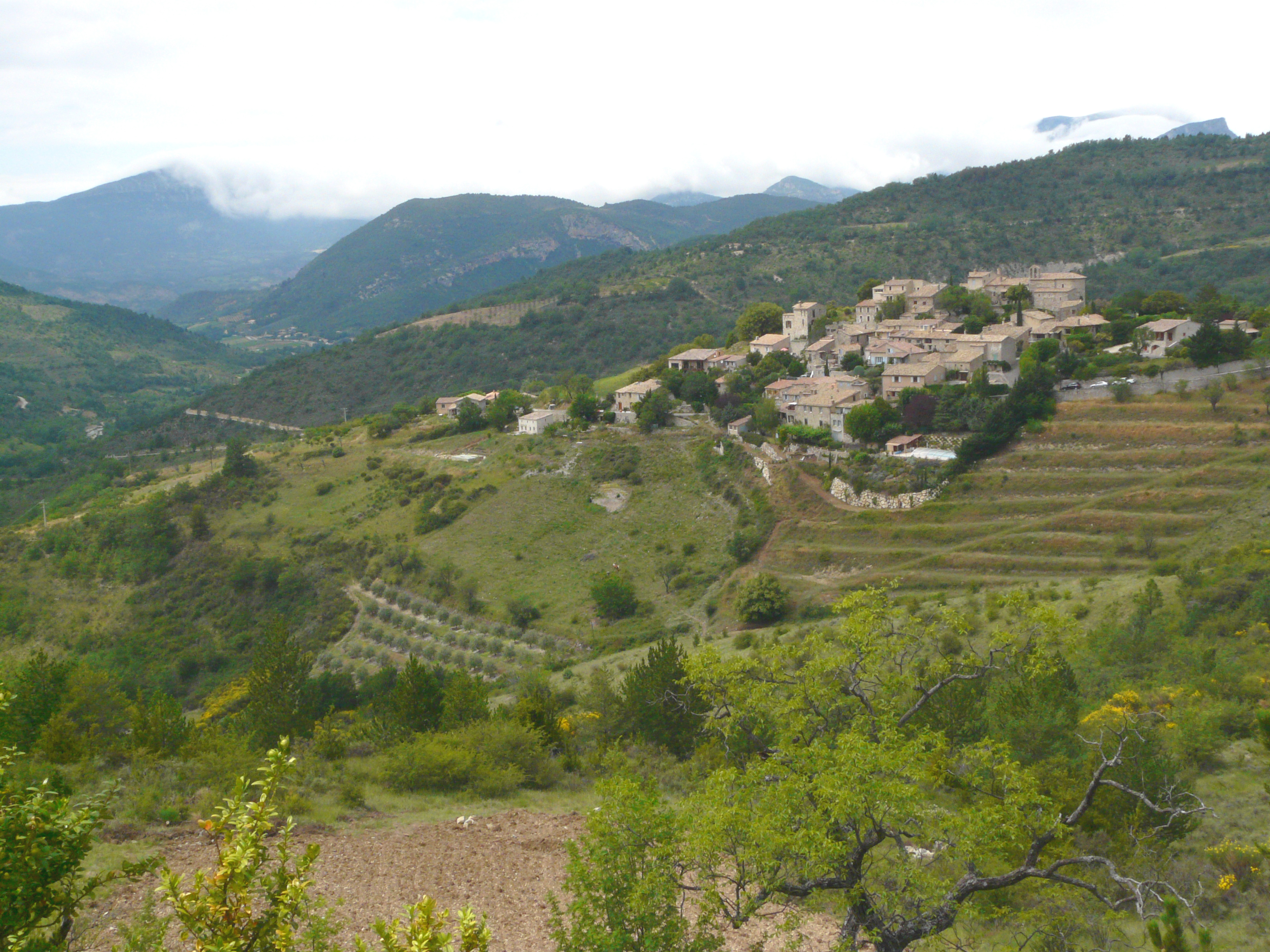
- A general view of the village of Arpavon
- Location of Arpavon
- Location within France Location within Auvergne-Rhône-Alpes
- Coordinates: 44°22′16″N 5°16′07″E
- Country: France
- Region: Auvergne-Rhône-Alpes
- Department: Drôme
- Arrondissement: Nyons
- Canton: Nyons et Baronnies
- Intercommunality: CC Baronnies Drôme Provençale

Government
  - Mayor (2020–2026): Marc Hamard
- Area^{1}: 13.45 km^{2} (5.19 sq mi)
- Highest elevation: 1,205 m (3,953 ft)
- Lowest elevation: 341 m (1,119 ft)
- Population (2023): 73
  - Density: 5.4/km^{2} (14/sq mi)
- Time zone: UTC+01:00 (CET)
  - Summer (DST): UTC+02:00 (CEST)
- INSEE/Postal code: 26013 /26110
- ^{1} French Land Register data, which excludes lakes, ponds, glaciers > 1 km^{2} (0.386 sq mi or 247 acres) and river estuaries.

Arpavon (French pronunciation: [aʁpavɔ̃]; Occitan: Arpavon) is a commune in the Drôme department in southeastern France.

== Population ==
Historical population
Year	Pop.	±% p.a.
1968	64	—
1975	43	−5.52%
1982	32	−4.13%
1990	44	+4.06%
1999	61	+3.70%
2007	70	+1.74%
2012	91	+5.39%
2017	77	−3.29%
2023	73	−0.89%
Source: INSEE

== See also ==
- Communes of the Drôme department
