= Curnier =

- Commune
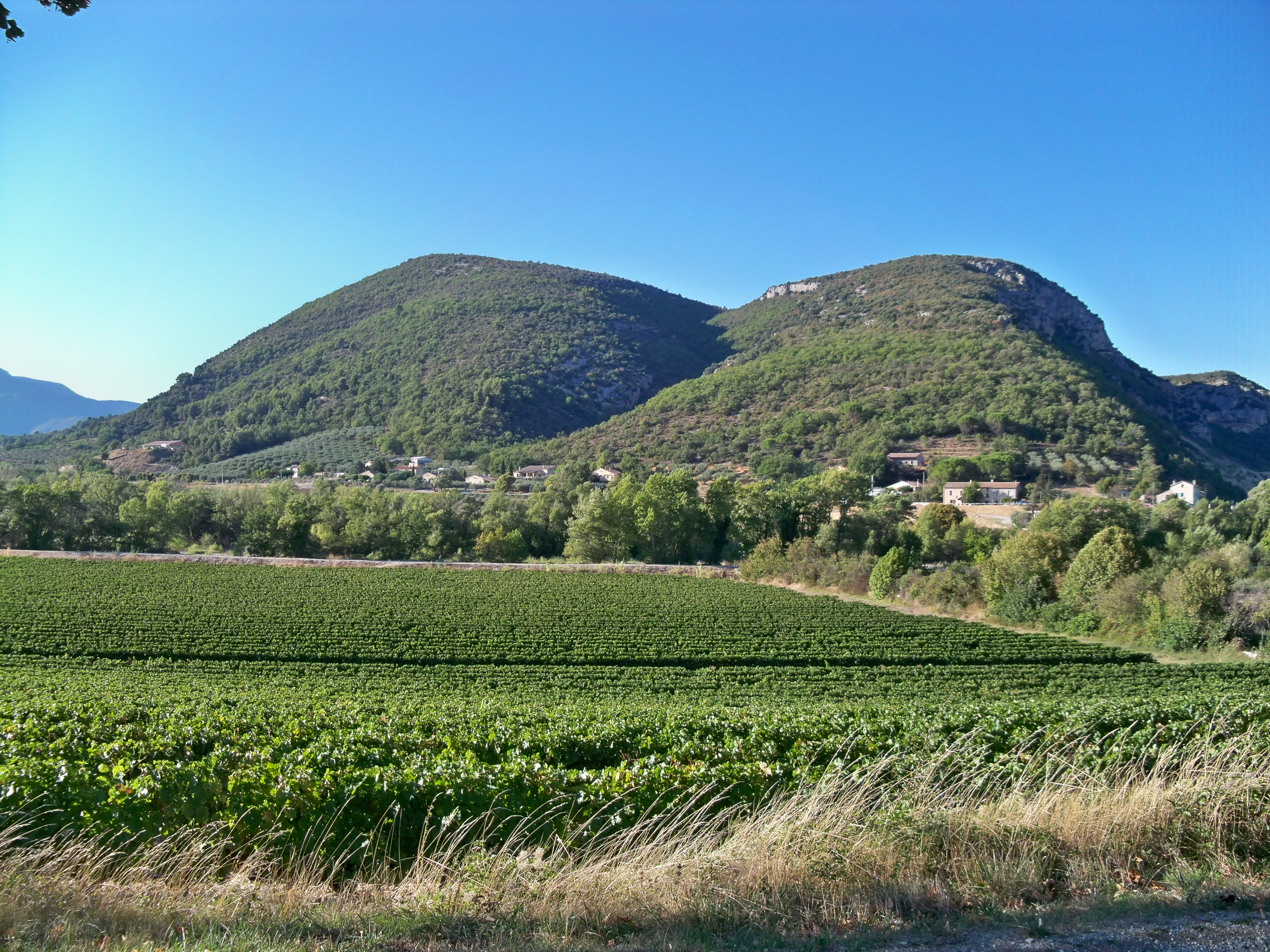
- A vineyard at Curnier
- Location of Curnier
- Location within France Location within Auvergne-Rhône-Alpes
- Coordinates: 44°23′09″N 5°14′06″E
- Country: France
- Region: Auvergne-Rhône-Alpes
- Department: Drôme
- Arrondissement: Nyons
- Canton: Nyons et Baronnies

Government
  - Mayor (2023–2026): Patricia Gielly
- Area^{1}: 8 km^{2} (3.1 sq mi)
- Highest elevation: 742 m (2,434 ft)
- Lowest elevation: 313 m (1,027 ft)
- Population (2023): 206
  - Density: 26/km^{2} (67/sq mi)
- Time zone: UTC+01:00 (CET)
  - Summer (DST): UTC+02:00 (CEST)
- INSEE/Postal code: 26112 /26110
- ^{1} French Land Register data, which excludes lakes, ponds, glaciers > 1 km^{2} (0.386 sq mi or 247 acres) and river estuaries.

Curnier (French pronunciation: [kyʁnje]) is a commune in the Drôme department in southeastern France.

== Population ==
Historical population
Year	Pop.	±% p.a.
1968	133	—
1975	145	+1.24%
1982	132	−1.33%
1990	179	+3.88%
1999	186	+0.43%
2007	213	+1.71%
2012	192	−2.05%
2017	181	−1.17%
2023	206	+2.18%
Source: INSEE

== See also ==
- Communes of the Drôme department
