= Cornillac =

- Commune
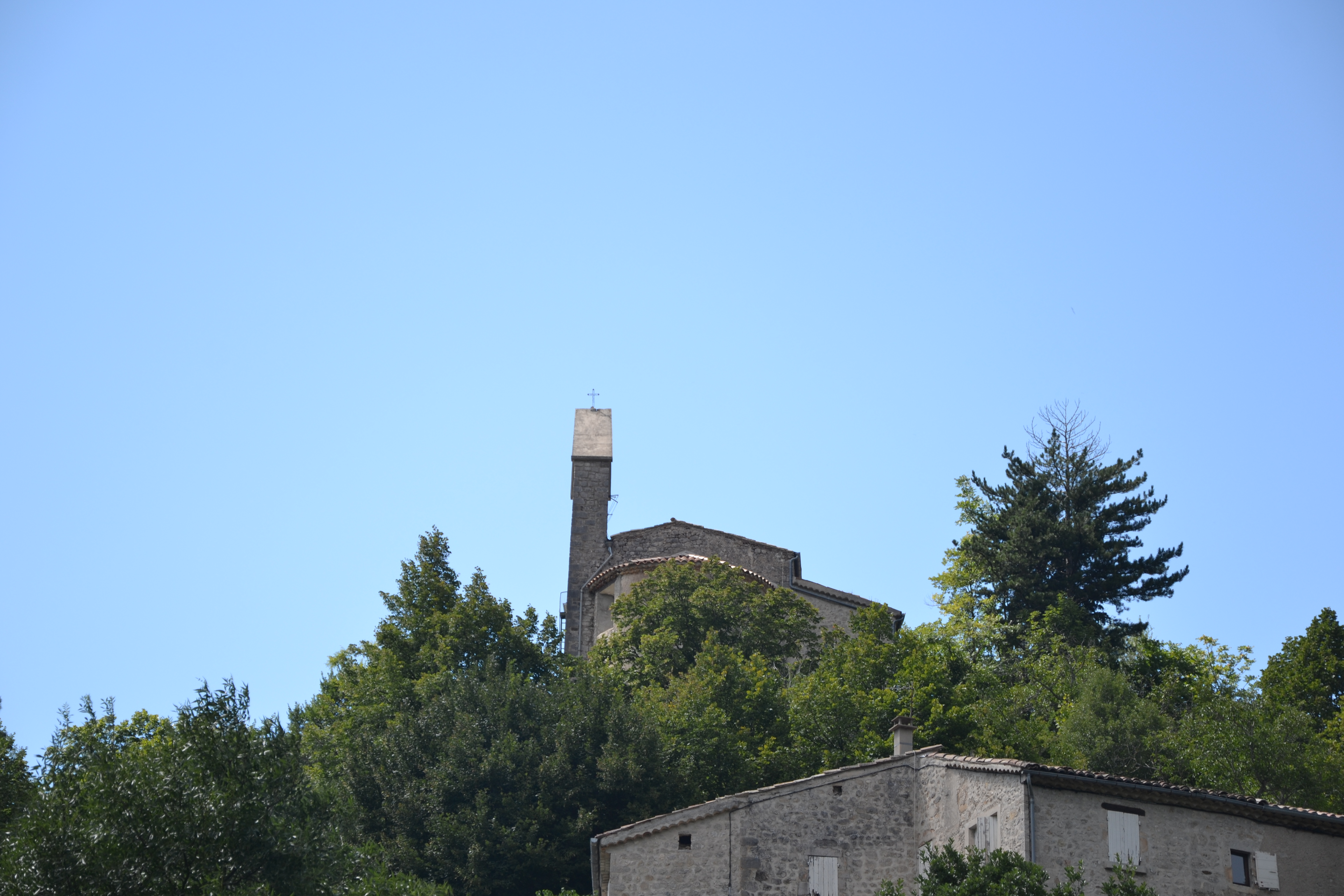
- The church in Cornillac

- Coat of arms
- Location of Cornillac
- Location within France Location within Auvergne-Rhône-Alpes
- Coordinates: 44°26′38″N 5°23′13″E
- Country: France
- Region: Auvergne-Rhône-Alpes
- Department: Drôme
- Arrondissement: Nyons
- Canton: Nyons et Baronnies

Government
  - Mayor (2020–2026): Yoann Gronchi
- Area^{1}: 19.44 km^{2} (7.51 sq mi)
- Highest elevation: 1,455 m (4,774 ft)
- Lowest elevation: 471 m (1,545 ft)
- Population (2023): 91
  - Density: 4.7/km^{2} (12/sq mi)
- Time zone: UTC+01:00 (CET)
  - Summer (DST): UTC+02:00 (CEST)
- INSEE/Postal code: 26104 /26510
- ^{1} French Land Register data, which excludes lakes, ponds, glaciers > 1 km^{2} (0.386 sq mi or 247 acres) and river estuaries.

Cornillac (French pronunciation: [kɔʁnijak]; Occitan: Cornilhac) is a commune in the Drôme department in southeastern France.

== Population ==
Historical population
Year	Pop.	±% p.a.
1968	74	—
1975	71	−0.59%
1982	59	−2.61%
1990	76	+3.22%
1999	81	+0.71%
2007	87	+0.90%
2012	85	−0.46%
2017	83	−0.48%
2023	91	+1.55%
Source: INSEE

== See also ==
- Communes of the Drôme department
