= Villefranche-le-Château =

Villefranche-le-Château Vilafrancha dau Chastèu (Occitan)
- Commune
- Location of Villefranche-le-Château
- Location within France Location within Auvergne-Rhône-Alpes
- Coordinates: 44°13′16″N 5°31′23″E
- Country: France
- Region: Auvergne-Rhône-Alpes
- Department: Drôme
- Arrondissement: Nyons
- Canton: Nyons et Baronnies

Government
  - Mayor (2022–2026): Eliane Gauthier
- Area^{1}: 7.42 km^{2} (2.86 sq mi)
- Elevation: 832 m (2,730 ft)
- Highest elevation: 1,364 m (4,475 ft)
- Lowest elevation: 783 m (2,569 ft)
- Population (2023): 20
  - Density: 2.7/km^{2} (7.0/sq mi)
- Time zone: UTC+01:00 (CET)
  - Summer (DST): UTC+02:00 (CEST)
- INSEE/Postal code: 26375 /26560
- ^{1} French Land Register data, which excludes lakes, ponds, glaciers > 1 km^{2} (0.386 sq mi or 247 acres) and river estuaries.

Villefranche-le-Château (French: [vilfʁɑ̃ʃ lə ʃɑto]; Vivaro-Alpine: Vilafrancha dau Chastèu) is a commune in the Drôme department in southeastern France.

== Population ==
Historical population
Year	Pop.	±% p.a.
1968	25	—
1975	22	−1.81%
1982	15	−5.32%
1990	20	+3.66%
1999	21	+0.54%
2007	23	+1.14%
2012	23	+0.00%
2017	20	−2.76%
2023	20	+0.00%
Source: INSEE

== See also ==
- Communes of the Drôme department
