= Plaisians =

- Commune
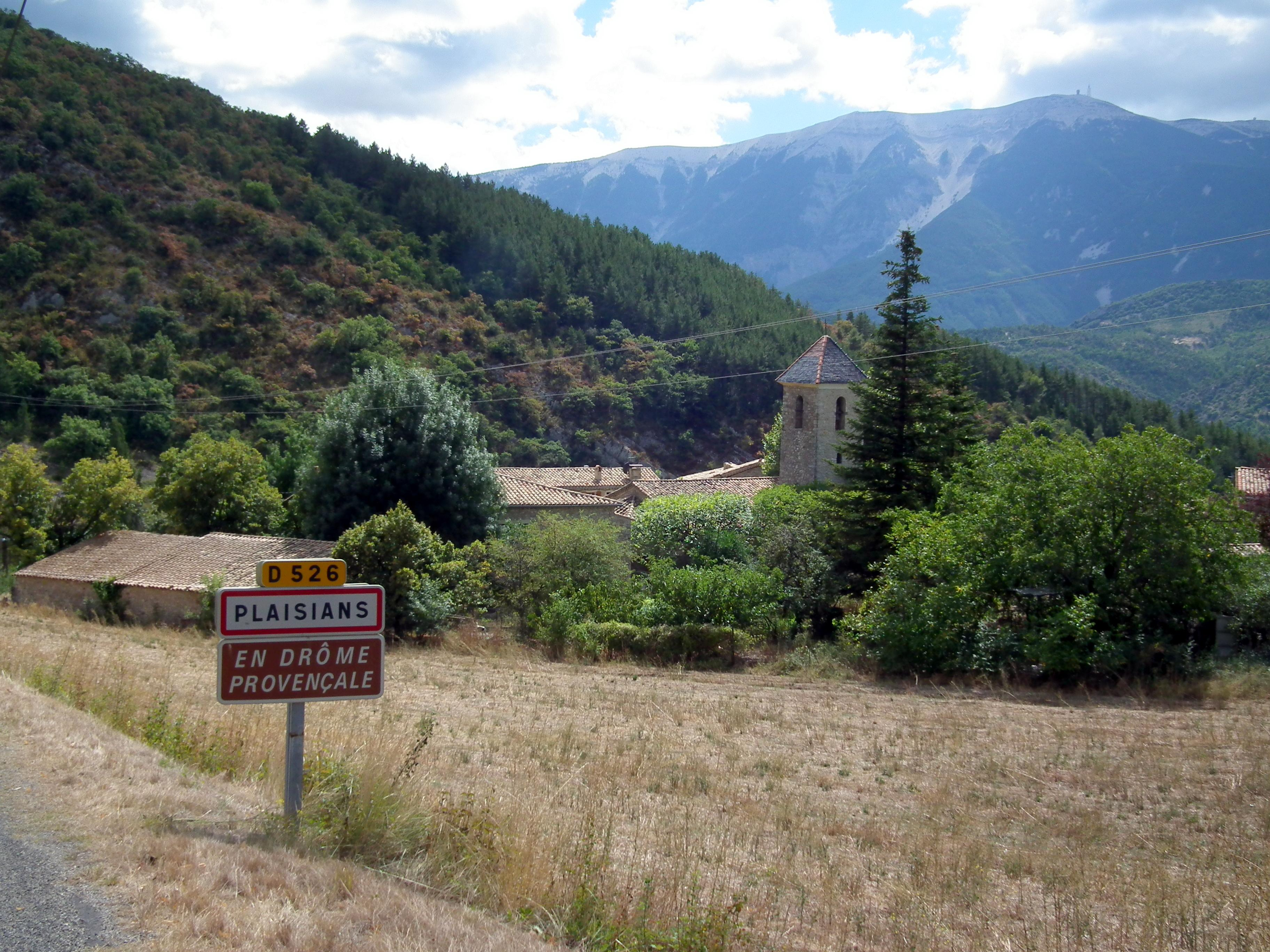
- A general view of Plaisians
- Location of Plaisians
- Location within France Location within Auvergne-Rhône-Alpes
- Coordinates: 44°13′48″N 5°19′05″E
- Country: France
- Region: Auvergne-Rhône-Alpes
- Department: Drôme
- Arrondissement: Nyons
- Canton: Nyons et Baronnies

Government
  - Mayor (2022–2026): Alain Monge
- Area^{1}: 29.64 km^{2} (11.44 sq mi)
- Highest elevation: 1,364 m (4,475 ft)
- Lowest elevation: 391 m (1,283 ft)
- Population (2023): 209
  - Density: 7.05/km^{2} (18.3/sq mi)
- Time zone: UTC+01:00 (CET)
  - Summer (DST): UTC+02:00 (CEST)
- INSEE/Postal code: 26239 /26170
- ^{1} French Land Register data, which excludes lakes, ponds, glaciers > 1 km^{2} (0.386 sq mi or 247 acres) and river estuaries.

Plaisians is a commune in the Drôme department in southeastern France.

== Population ==
Historical population
Year	Pop.	±% p.a.
1968	147	—
1975	118	−3.09%
1982	120	+0.24%
1990	157	+3.42%
1999	175	+1.21%
2007	187	+0.83%
2012	183	−0.43%
2017	199	+1.69%
2023	209	+0.82%
Source: INSEE

== See also ==
- Communes of the Drôme department
