= Eyroles =

- Commune
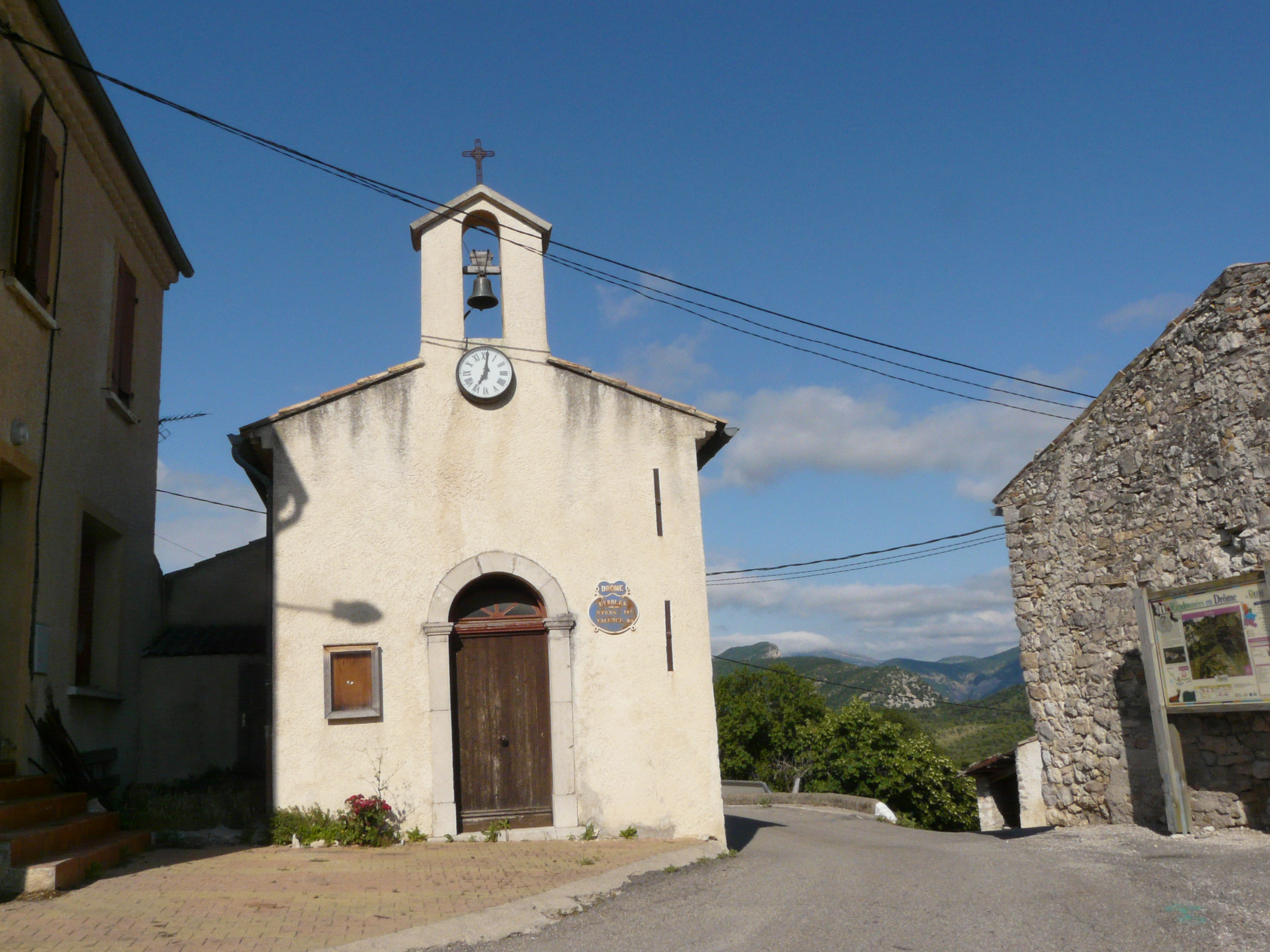
- The church of the village of Eyroles
- Location of Eyroles
- Location within France Location within Auvergne-Rhône-Alpes
- Coordinates: 44°25′05″N 5°13′39″E
- Country: France
- Region: Auvergne-Rhône-Alpes
- Department: Drôme
- Arrondissement: Nyons
- Canton: Nyons et Baronnies

Government
  - Mayor (2020–2026): Sébastien Dupoux
- Area^{1}: 8.75 km^{2} (3.38 sq mi)
- Highest elevation: 805 m (2,641 ft)
- Lowest elevation: 380 m (1,250 ft)
- Population (2023): 22
  - Density: 2.5/km^{2} (6.5/sq mi)
- Time zone: UTC+01:00 (CET)
  - Summer (DST): UTC+02:00 (CEST)
- INSEE/Postal code: 26130 /26110
- ^{1} French Land Register data, which excludes lakes, ponds, glaciers > 1 km^{2} (0.386 sq mi or 247 acres) and river estuaries.

Eyroles (French pronunciation: [ɛʁɔl]; Occitan: Airòlas) is a commune in the Drôme department in the Auvergne-Rhône-Alpes region in southeastern France.

== Population ==
Historical population
Year	Pop.	±% p.a.
1968	29	—
1975	18	−6.59%
1982	20	+1.52%
1990	20	+0.00%
1999	17	−1.79%
2007	22	+3.28%
2012	29	+5.68%
2017	28	−0.70%
2023	22	−3.94%
Source: INSEE

== See also ==
- Communes of the Drôme department
