= Les Pilles =

- Commune
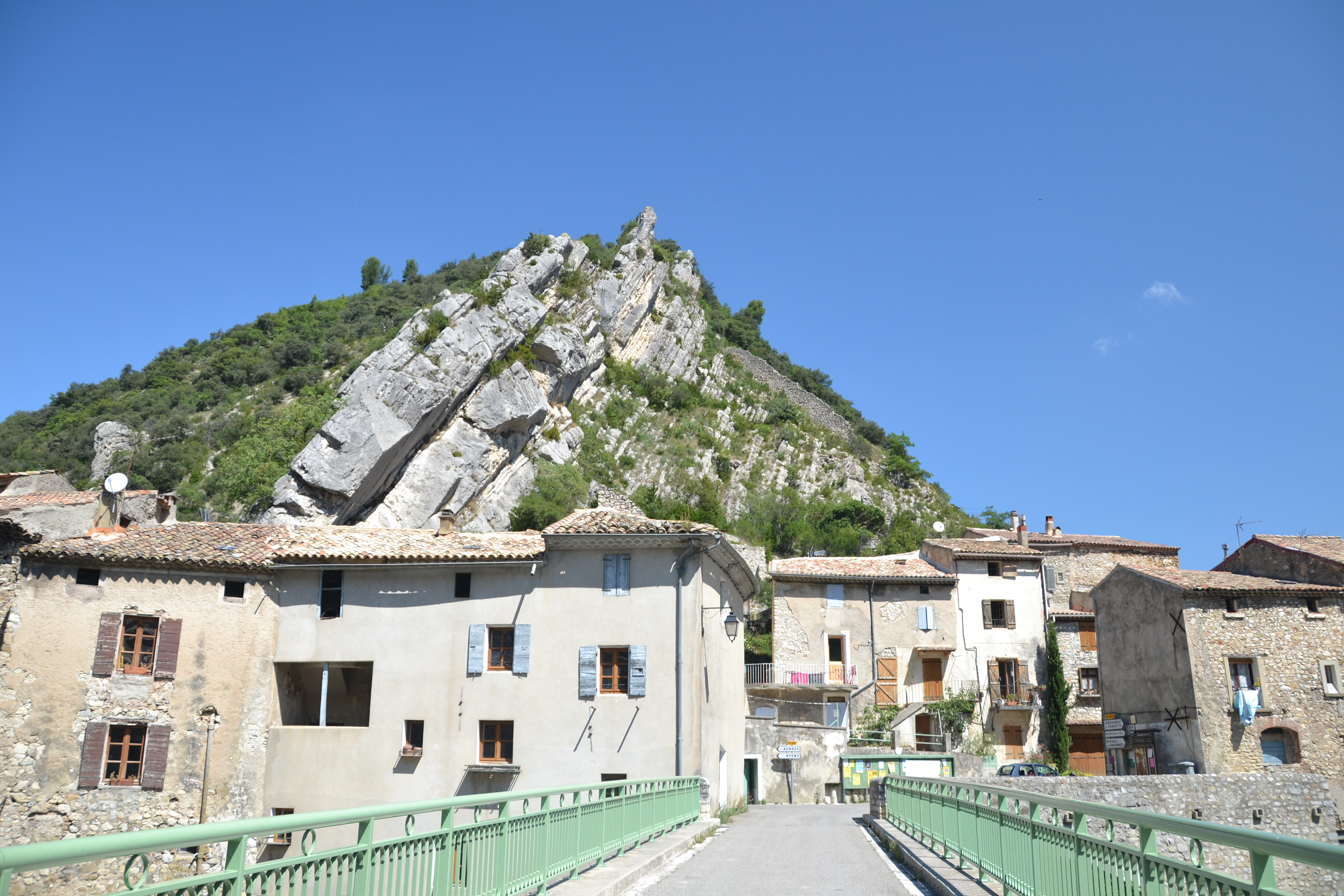
- A view of part of the village of Les Pilles

- Coat of arms
- Location of Les Pilles
- Location within France Location within Auvergne-Rhône-Alpes
- Coordinates: 44°22′49″N 5°11′28″E
- Country: France
- Region: Auvergne-Rhône-Alpes
- Department: Drôme
- Arrondissement: Nyons
- Canton: Nyons et Baronnies
- Intercommunality: Baronnies en Drôme Provençale

Government
  - Mayor (2020–2026): Philippe Ledesert
- Area^{1}: 5.84 km^{2} (2.25 sq mi)
- Highest elevation: 920 m (3,020 ft)
- Lowest elevation: 288 m (945 ft)
- Population (2023): 217
  - Density: 37.2/km^{2} (96.2/sq mi)
- Time zone: UTC+01:00 (CET)
  - Summer (DST): UTC+02:00 (CEST)
- INSEE/Postal code: 26238 /26110
- ^{1} French Land Register data, which excludes lakes, ponds, glaciers > 1 km^{2} (0.386 sq mi or 247 acres) and river estuaries.

Les Pilles (Occitan: Los Comprimits) is a commune in the Drôme department in southeastern France.

== Population ==
Historical population
Year	Pop.	±% p.a.
1968	213	—
1975	157	−4.26%
1982	167	+0.89%
1990	213	+3.09%
1999	226	+0.66%
2007	252	+1.37%
2012	248	−0.32%
2017	246	−0.16%
2023	217	−2.07%
Source: INSEE

== See also ==
- Communes of the Drôme department
