= Mérindol-les-Oliviers =

- Commune
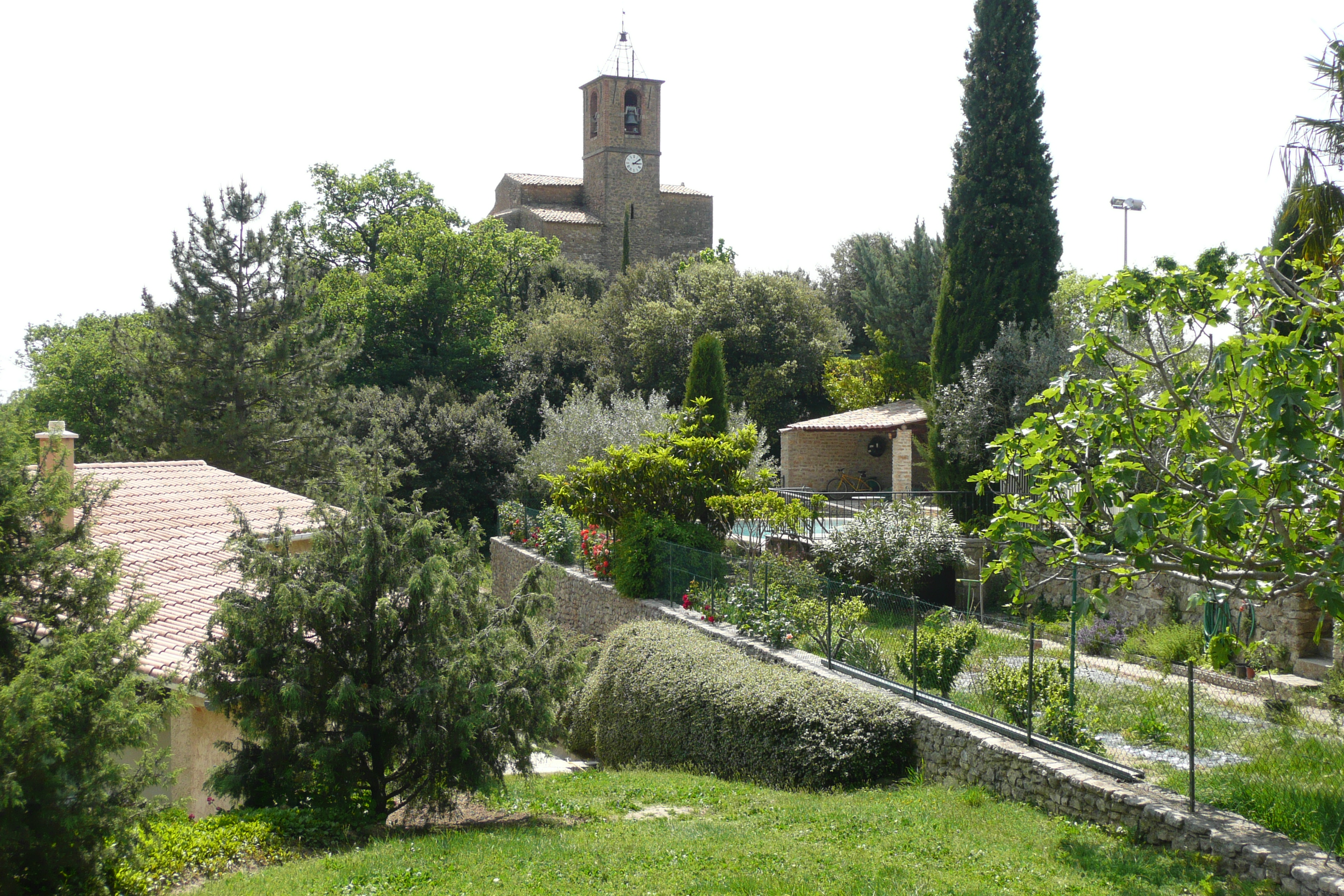
- The church in Mérindol-les-Oliviers

- Coat of arms
- Location of Mérindol-les-Oliviers
- Location within France Location within Auvergne-Rhône-Alpes
- Coordinates: 44°16′29″N 5°10′06″E
- Country: France
- Region: Auvergne-Rhône-Alpes
- Department: Drôme
- Arrondissement: Nyons
- Canton: Nyons et Baronnies

Government
  - Mayor (2020–2026): Augustin Clement
- Area^{1}: 9.23 km^{2} (3.56 sq mi)
- Highest elevation: 782 m (2,566 ft)
- Lowest elevation: 266 m (873 ft)
- Population (2023): 208
  - Density: 22.5/km^{2} (58.4/sq mi)
- Time zone: UTC+01:00 (CET)
  - Summer (DST): UTC+02:00 (CEST)
- INSEE/Postal code: 26180 /26170
- ^{1} French Land Register data, which excludes lakes, ponds, glaciers > 1 km^{2} (0.386 sq mi or 247 acres) and river estuaries.

Mérindol-les-Oliviers (French pronunciation: [meʁɛ̃dɔl le.z‿ɔlivje]; Occitan: Merindòu) is a commune in the Drôme department in southeastern France.

== Population ==
Historical population
Year	Pop.	±% p.a.
1968	201	—
1975	200	−0.07%
1982	171	−2.21%
1990	201	+2.04%
1999	201	+0.00%
2007	189	−0.77%
2012	202	+1.34%
2017	236	+3.16%
2023	208	−2.08%
Source: INSEE

== See also ==
- Communes of the Drôme department
