= Ballons =

- Commune
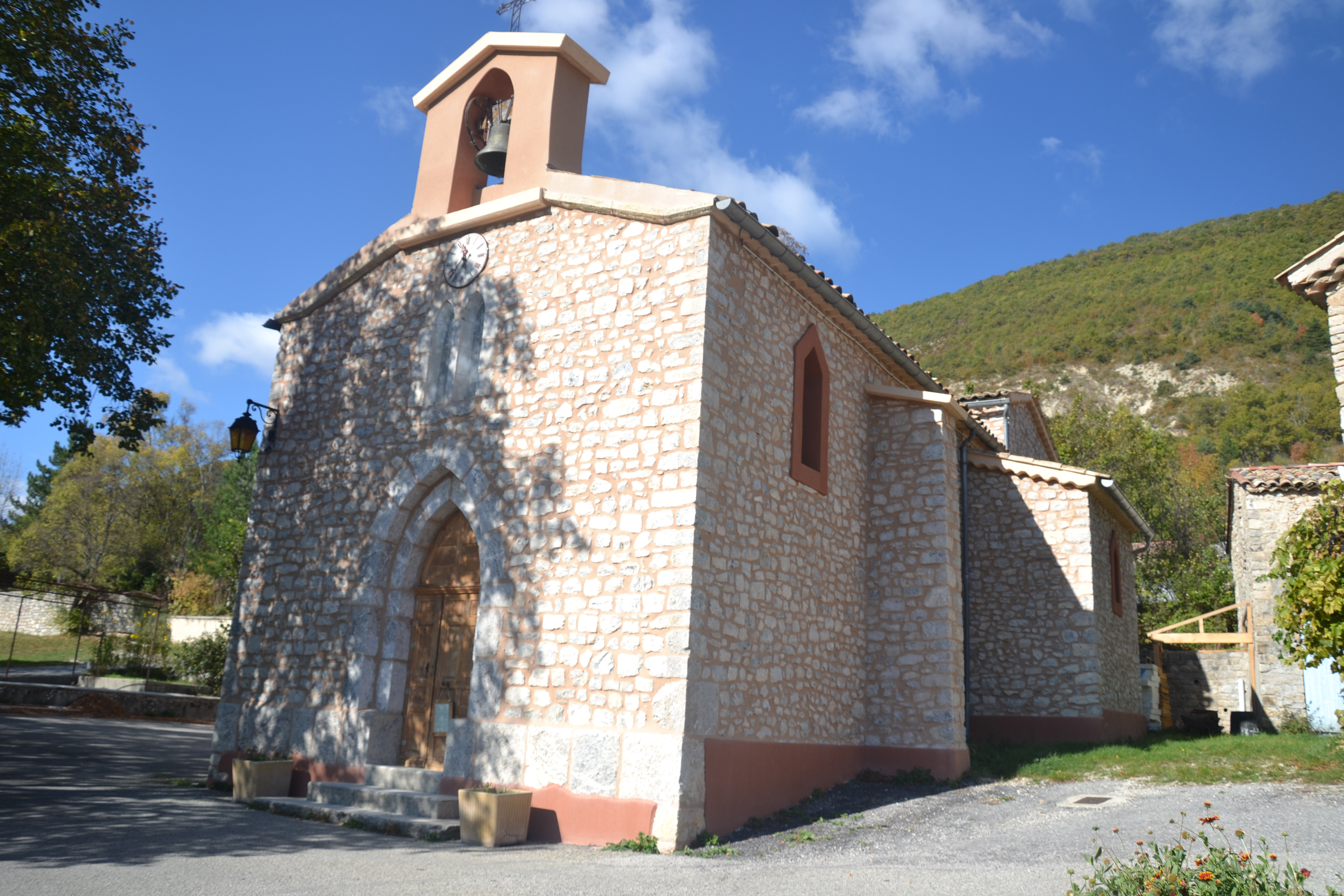
- The church in Ballons
- Location of Ballons
- Location within France Location within Auvergne-Rhône-Alpes
- Coordinates: 44°15′22″N 5°38′41″E
- Country: France
- Region: Auvergne-Rhône-Alpes
- Department: Drôme
- Arrondissement: Nyons
- Canton: Nyons et Baronnies
- Intercommunality: Baronnies en Drôme Provençale

Government
  - Mayor (2020–2026): Lionel Fougeras
- Area^{1}: 17.23 km^{2} (6.65 sq mi)
- Elevation: 752.3 m (2,468 ft)
- Highest elevation: 1,390 m (4,560 ft)
- Lowest elevation: 674 m (2,211 ft)
- Population (2023): 88
  - Density: 5.1/km^{2} (13/sq mi)
- Time zone: UTC+01:00 (CET)
  - Summer (DST): UTC+02:00 (CEST)
- INSEE/Postal code: 26022 /26560
- ^{1} French Land Register data, which excludes lakes, ponds, glaciers > 1 km^{2} (0.386 sq mi or 247 acres) and river estuaries.

Ballons (French pronunciation: [balɔ̃]; Occitan: Balon) is a commune in the department of Drôme in the Auvergne-Rhône-Alpes region in southeastern France.

== Population ==
Historical population
Year	Pop.	±% p.a.
1968	49	—
1975	53	+1.13%
1982	44	−2.62%
1990	46	+0.56%
1999	66	+4.09%
2007	88	+3.66%
2012	79	−2.13%
2017	83	+0.99%
2023	88	+0.98%
Source: INSEE

== See also ==
- Communes of the Drôme department
