= Pommerol =

- Commune
- Coat of arms
- Location of Pommerol
- Location within France Location within Auvergne-Rhône-Alpes
- Coordinates: 44°26′49″N 5°27′10″E
- Country: France
- Region: Auvergne-Rhône-Alpes
- Department: Drôme
- Arrondissement: Nyons
- Canton: Nyons et Baronnies

Government
  - Mayor (2020–2026): Gilbert Morin
- Area^{1}: 9.83 km^{2} (3.80 sq mi)
- Highest elevation: 1,563 m (5,128 ft)
- Lowest elevation: 717 m (2,352 ft)
- Population (2023): 10
  - Density: 1.0/km^{2} (2.6/sq mi)
- Time zone: UTC+01:00 (CET)
  - Summer (DST): UTC+02:00 (CEST)
- INSEE/Postal code: 26245 /26470
- ^{1} French Land Register data, which excludes lakes, ponds, glaciers > 1 km^{2} (0.386 sq mi or 247 acres) and river estuaries.

Pommerol (French pronunciation: [pɔmʁɔl]; Occitan: Pomairòu) is a commune in the Drôme department in southeastern France.

== Population ==
Historical population
Year	Pop.	±% p.a.
1968	17	—
1975	13	−3.76%
1982	13	+0.00%
1990	14	+0.93%
1999	21	+4.61%
2007	18	−1.91%
2012	18	+0.00%
2017	11	−9.38%
2023	10	−1.58%
Source: INSEE

== See also ==
- Communes of the Drôme department
