= Le Poët-Sigillat =

- Commune
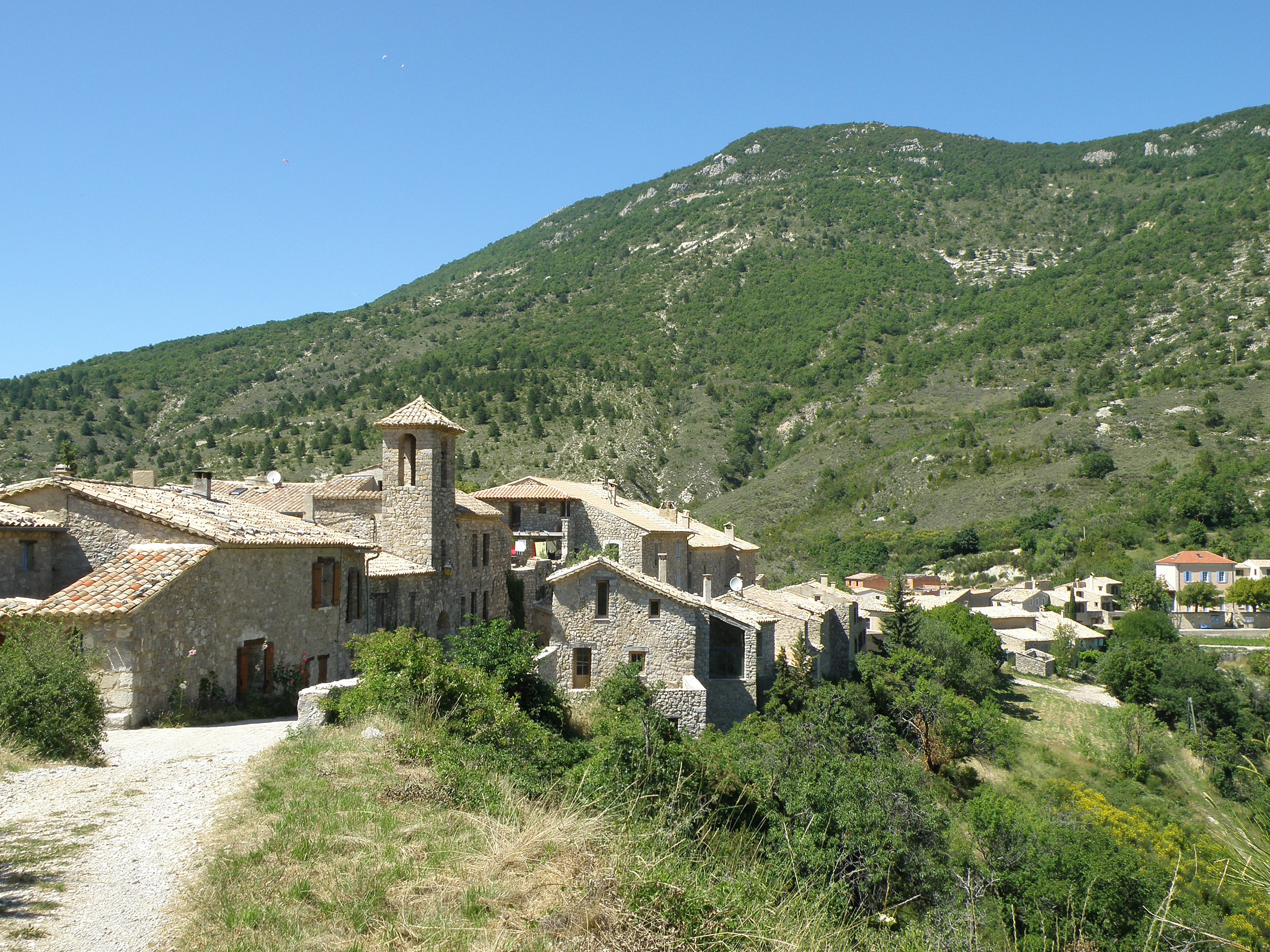
- A general view of Le Poët-Sigillat
- Location of Le Poët-Sigillat
- Location within France Location within Auvergne-Rhône-Alpes
- Coordinates: 44°22′11″N 5°19′04″E
- Country: France
- Region: Auvergne-Rhône-Alpes
- Department: Drôme
- Arrondissement: Nyons
- Canton: Nyons et Baronnies

Government
  - Mayor (2020–2026): Monique Balduchi
- Area^{1}: 15.36 km^{2} (5.93 sq mi)
- Highest elevation: 1,301 m (4,268 ft)
- Lowest elevation: 433 m (1,421 ft)
- Population (2023): 114
  - Density: 7.42/km^{2} (19.2/sq mi)
- Time zone: UTC+01:00 (CET)
  - Summer (DST): UTC+02:00 (CEST)
- INSEE/Postal code: 26244 /26110
- ^{1} French Land Register data, which excludes lakes, ponds, glaciers > 1 km^{2} (0.386 sq mi or 247 acres) and river estuaries.

Le Poët-Sigillat (Occitan: Lo Poèta-Sigillat) is a commune in the Drôme department in southeastern France.

== Population ==
Historical population
Year	Pop.	±% p.a.
1968	47	—
1975	43	−1.26%
1982	47	+1.28%
1990	77	+6.37%
1999	97	+2.60%
2007	113	+1.93%
2012	117	+0.70%
2017	121	+0.67%
2023	114	−0.99%
Source: INSEE

== See also ==
- Communes of the Drôme department
