= Rochebrune, Drôme =

Rochebrune
- Commune
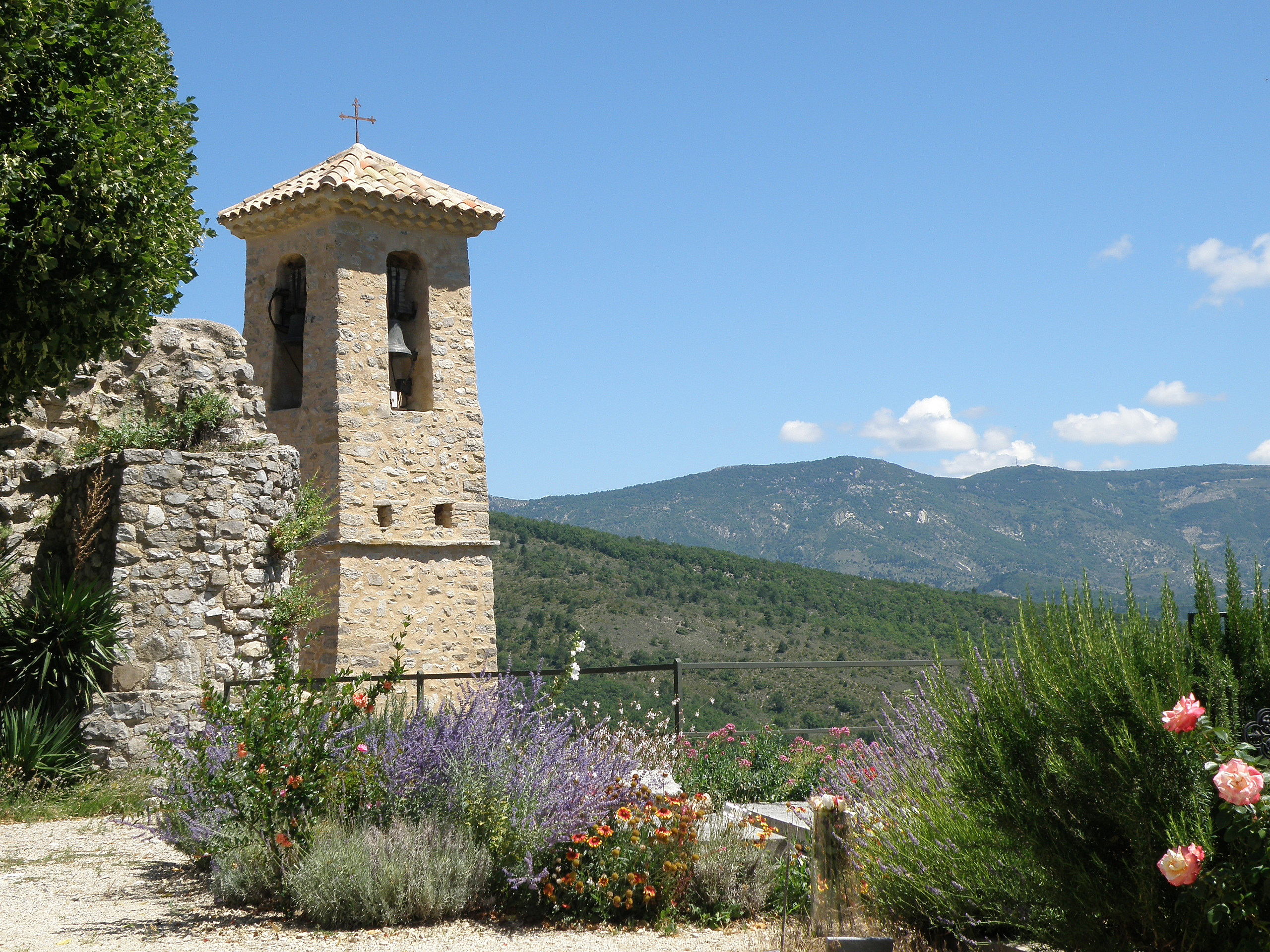
- The church of Saint-Michel, in Rochebrune
- Location of Rochebrune
- Location within France Location within Auvergne-Rhône-Alpes
- Coordinates: 44°20′16″N 5°14′47″E
- Country: France
- Region: Auvergne-Rhône-Alpes
- Department: Drôme
- Arrondissement: Nyons
- Canton: Nyons et Baronnies

Government
  - Mayor (2020–2026): Jean-Louis Nicolas
- Area^{1}: 16.15 km^{2} (6.24 sq mi)
- Highest elevation: 1,189 m (3,901 ft)
- Lowest elevation: 440 m (1,440 ft)
- Population (2023): 49
  - Density: 3.0/km^{2} (7.9/sq mi)
- Time zone: UTC+01:00 (CET)
  - Summer (DST): UTC+02:00 (CEST)
- INSEE/Postal code: 26269 /26110
- ^{1} French Land Register data, which excludes lakes, ponds, glaciers > 1 km^{2} (0.386 sq mi or 247 acres) and river estuaries.

Rochebrune (French pronunciation: [ʁɔʃbʁyn]; Occitan: Ròchabruna) is a commune in the Drôme department in southeastern France.

== Population ==
Historical population
Year	Pop.	±% p.a.
1968	30	—
1975	45	+5.96%
1982	54	+2.64%
1990	48	−1.46%
1999	45	−0.71%
2007	46	+0.28%
2012	55	+3.64%
2017	61	+2.09%
2023	49	−3.59%
Source: INSEE

== See also ==
- Communes of the Drôme department
