= Montaulieu =

- Commune
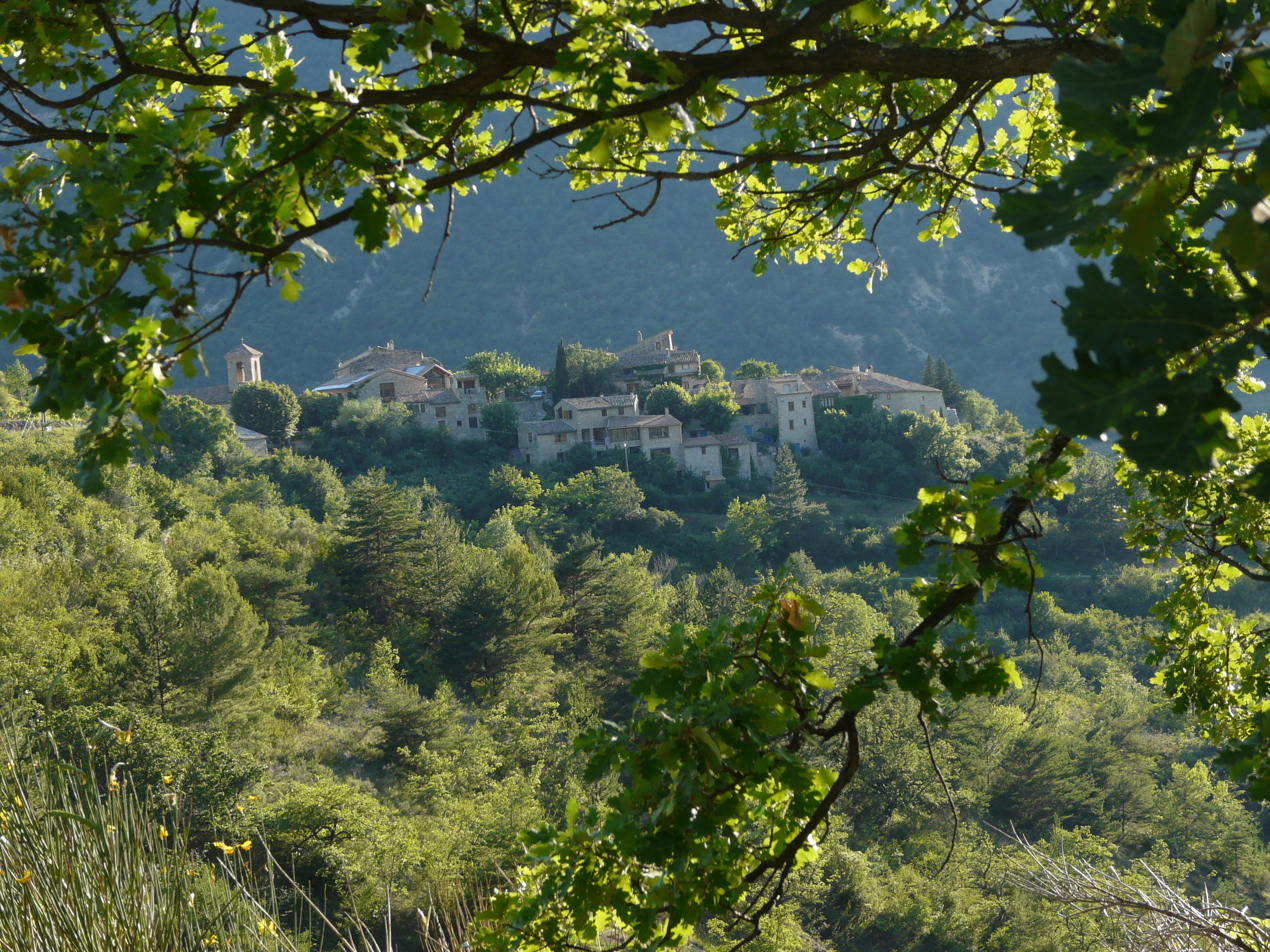
- A general view of Montaulieu

- Coat of arms
- Location of Montaulieu
- Location within France Location within Auvergne-Rhône-Alpes
- Coordinates: 44°21′30″N 5°13′29″E
- Country: France
- Region: Auvergne-Rhône-Alpes
- Department: Drôme
- Arrondissement: Nyons
- Canton: Nyons et Baronnies

Government
  - Mayor (2020–2026): Stéphane de Coninck
- Area^{1}: 13.05 km^{2} (5.04 sq mi)
- Elevation: 500 m (1,600 ft)
- Highest elevation: 978 m (3,209 ft)
- Lowest elevation: 310 m (1,020 ft)
- Population (2023): 89
  - Density: 6.8/km^{2} (18/sq mi)
- Time zone: UTC+01:00 (CET)
  - Summer (DST): UTC+02:00 (CEST)
- INSEE/Postal code: 26190 /26110
- ^{1} French Land Register data, which excludes lakes, ponds, glaciers > 1 km^{2} (0.386 sq mi or 247 acres) and river estuaries.

Montaulieu (French pronunciation: [mɔ̃toljø]; Occitan: Montoliu) is a commune in the Drôme department in southeastern France.

== Population ==
Historical population
Year	Pop.	±% p.a.
1968	41	—
1975	49	+2.58%
1982	69	+5.01%
1990	51	−3.71%
1999	64	+2.55%
2007	74	+1.83%
2012	78	+1.06%
2017	83	+1.25%
2023	89	+1.17%
Source: INSEE

== See also ==
- Communes of the Drôme department
