= Villeperdrix =

- Commune
- Location of Villeperdrix
- Location within France Location within Auvergne-Rhône-Alpes
- Coordinates: 44°26′31″N 5°17′17″E
- Country: France
- Region: Auvergne-Rhône-Alpes
- Department: Drôme
- Arrondissement: Nyons
- Canton: Nyons et Baronnies

Government
  - Mayor (2020–2026): Jacques Nivon
- Area^{1}: 26.15 km^{2} (10.10 sq mi)
- Elevation: 475 m (1,558 ft)
- Highest elevation: 1,480 m (4,860 ft)
- Lowest elevation: 365 m (1,198 ft)
- Population (2023): 103
  - Density: 3.94/km^{2} (10.2/sq mi)
- Time zone: UTC+01:00 (CET)
  - Summer (DST): UTC+02:00 (CEST)
- INSEE/Postal code: 26376 /26510
- ^{1} French Land Register data, which excludes lakes, ponds, glaciers > 1 km^{2} (0.386 sq mi or 247 acres) and river estuaries.

Villeperdrix (French pronunciation: [vilpɛʁdʁi]; Occitan: Vilaperdritz) is a commune in the Drôme department in southeastern France.

== Population ==
Historical population
Year	Pop.	±% p.a.
1968	93	—
1975	83	−1.61%
1982	81	−0.35%
1990	93	+1.74%
1999	110	+1.88%
2007	105	−0.58%
2012	104	−0.19%
2017	118	+2.56%
2023	103	−2.24%
Source: INSEE

== See also ==
- Communes of the Drôme department
