= Bénivay-Ollon =

- Commune
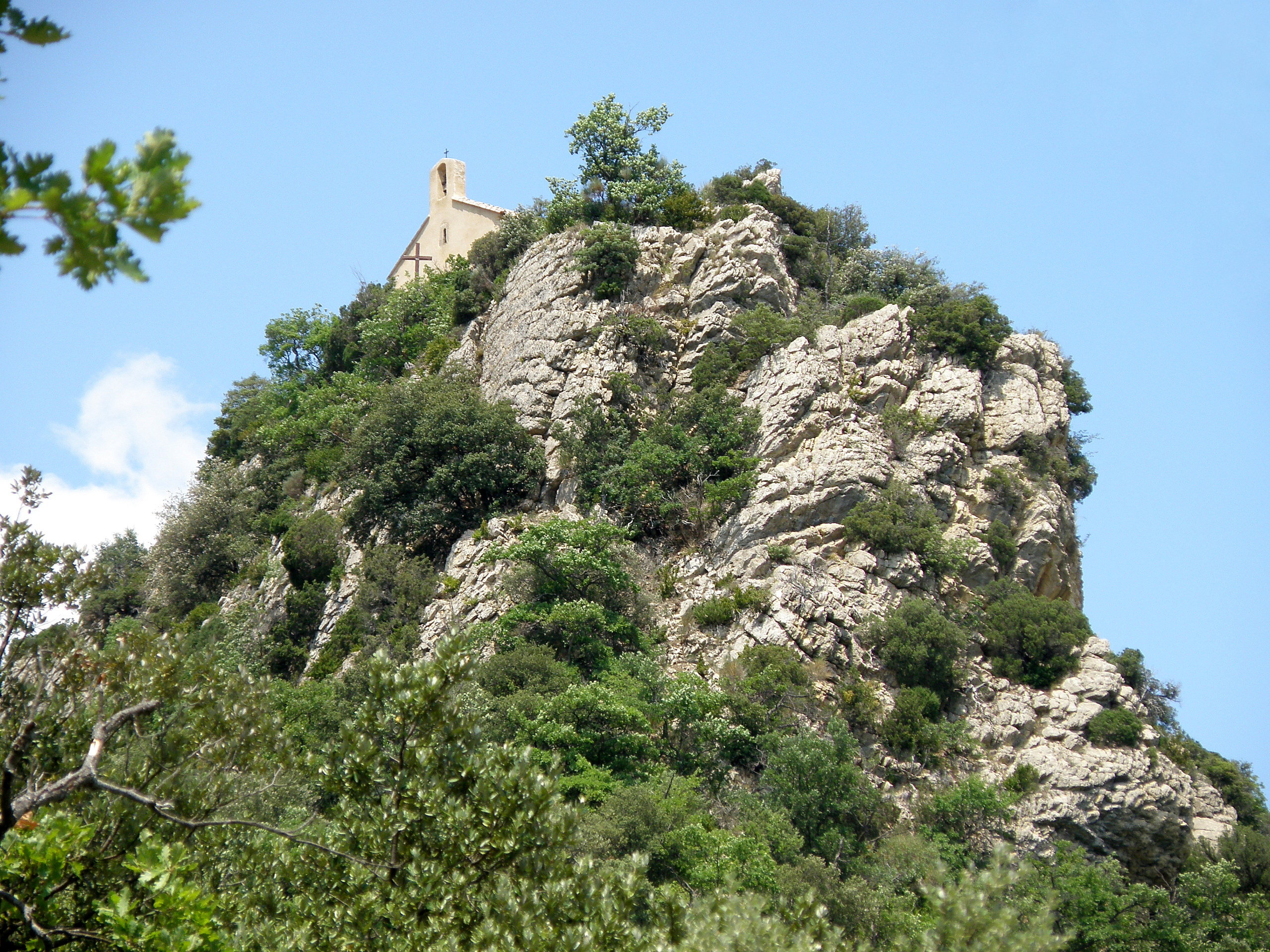
- The chapel of Saint-Jean in Bénivay-Ollon
- Location of Bénivay-Ollon
- Location within France Location within Auvergne-Rhône-Alpes
- Coordinates: 44°17′55″N 5°11′28″E
- Country: France
- Region: Auvergne-Rhône-Alpes
- Department: Drôme
- Arrondissement: Nyons
- Canton: Nyons et Baronnies

Government
  - Mayor (2020–2026): Daniel Charrasse
- Area^{1}: 9.03 km^{2} (3.49 sq mi)
- Highest elevation: 854 m (2,802 ft)
- Lowest elevation: 374 m (1,227 ft)
- Population (2023): 69
  - Density: 7.6/km^{2} (20/sq mi)
- Time zone: UTC+01:00 (CET)
  - Summer (DST): UTC+02:00 (CEST)
- INSEE/Postal code: 26048 /26170
- ^{1} French Land Register data, which excludes lakes, ponds, glaciers > 1 km^{2} (0.386 sq mi or 247 acres) and river estuaries.

Bénivay-Ollon (French pronunciation: [benivɛ ɔlɔ̃]; Occitan: Benivai) is a commune in the Drôme department in southeastern France.

== Population ==
Historical population
Year	Pop.	±% p.a.
1968	44	—
1975	55	+3.24%
1982	77	+4.92%
1990	74	−0.50%
1999	57	−2.86%
2007	63	+1.26%
2012	64	+0.32%
2017	66	+0.62%
2023	69	+0.74%
Source: INSEE

== See also ==
- Communes of the Drôme department
