= Beauvoisin, Drôme =

Beauvoisin
- Commune
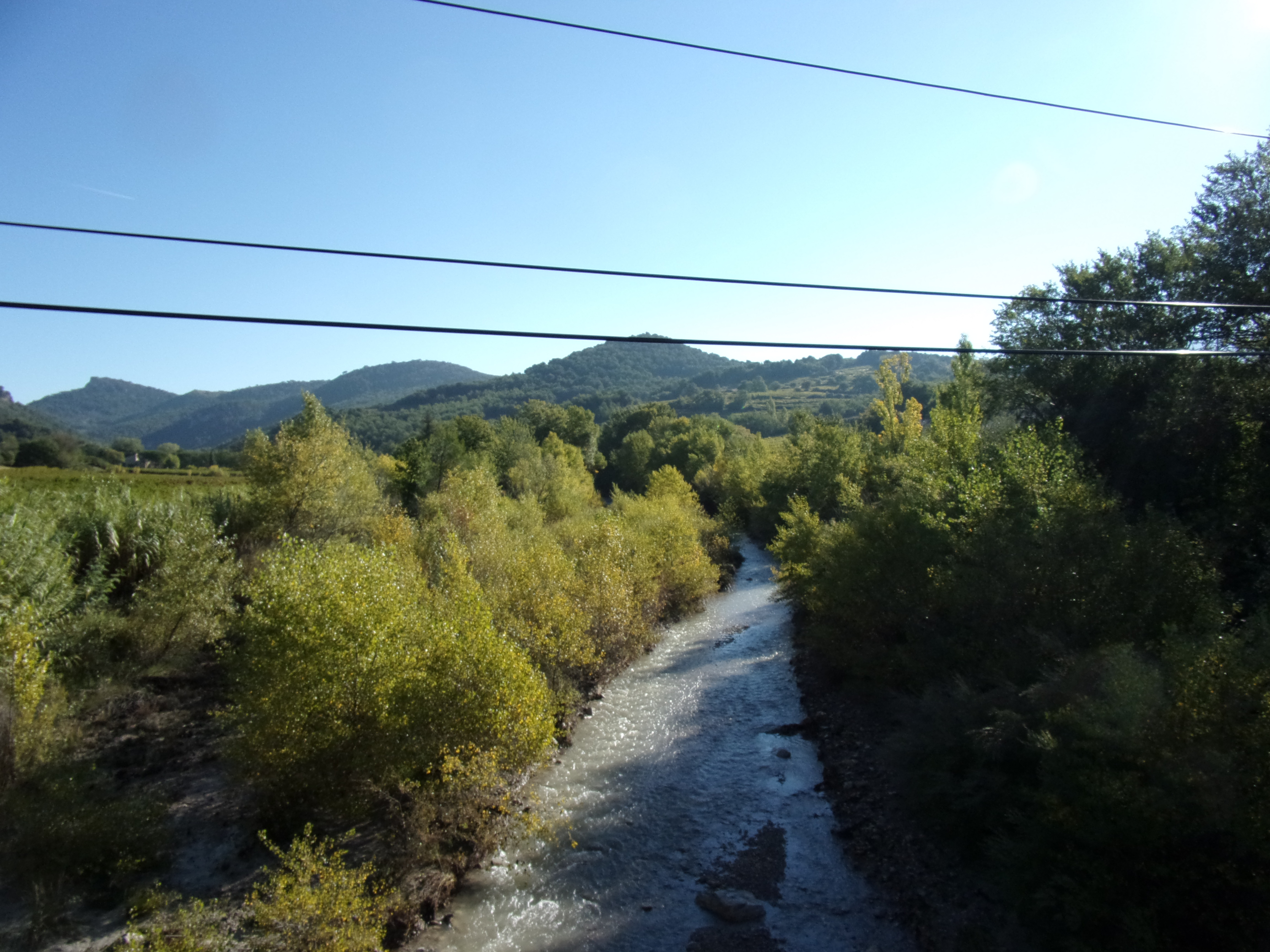
- The Ayguemarse river at Beauvoisin
- Location of Beauvoisin
- Location within France Location within Auvergne-Rhône-Alpes
- Coordinates: 44°18′08″N 5°12′42″E
- Country: France
- Region: Auvergne-Rhône-Alpes
- Department: Drôme
- Arrondissement: Nyons
- Canton: Nyons et Baronnies

Government
  - Mayor (2020–2026): Christian Thiriot
- Area^{1}: 8.90 km^{2} (3.44 sq mi)
- Highest elevation: 1,034 m (3,392 ft)
- Lowest elevation: 409 m (1,342 ft)
- Population (2023): 141
  - Density: 15.8/km^{2} (41.0/sq mi)
- Time zone: UTC+01:00 (CET)
  - Summer (DST): UTC+02:00 (CEST)
- INSEE/Postal code: 26043 /26170
- ^{1} French Land Register data, which excludes lakes, ponds, glaciers > 1 km^{2} (0.386 sq mi or 247 acres) and river estuaries.

Beauvoisin (French pronunciation: [bovwazɛ̃]; Occitan: Bèuvesin) is a commune in the Drôme department in southeastern France.

== Population ==
Historical population
Year	Pop.	±% p.a.
1968	60	—
1975	63	+0.70%
1982	63	+0.00%
1990	71	+1.51%
1999	93	+3.04%
2007	158	+6.85%
2012	157	−0.13%
2017	145	−1.58%
2023	141	−0.47%
Source: INSEE

== See also ==
- Communes of the Drôme department
