= Chaudebonne =

- Commune
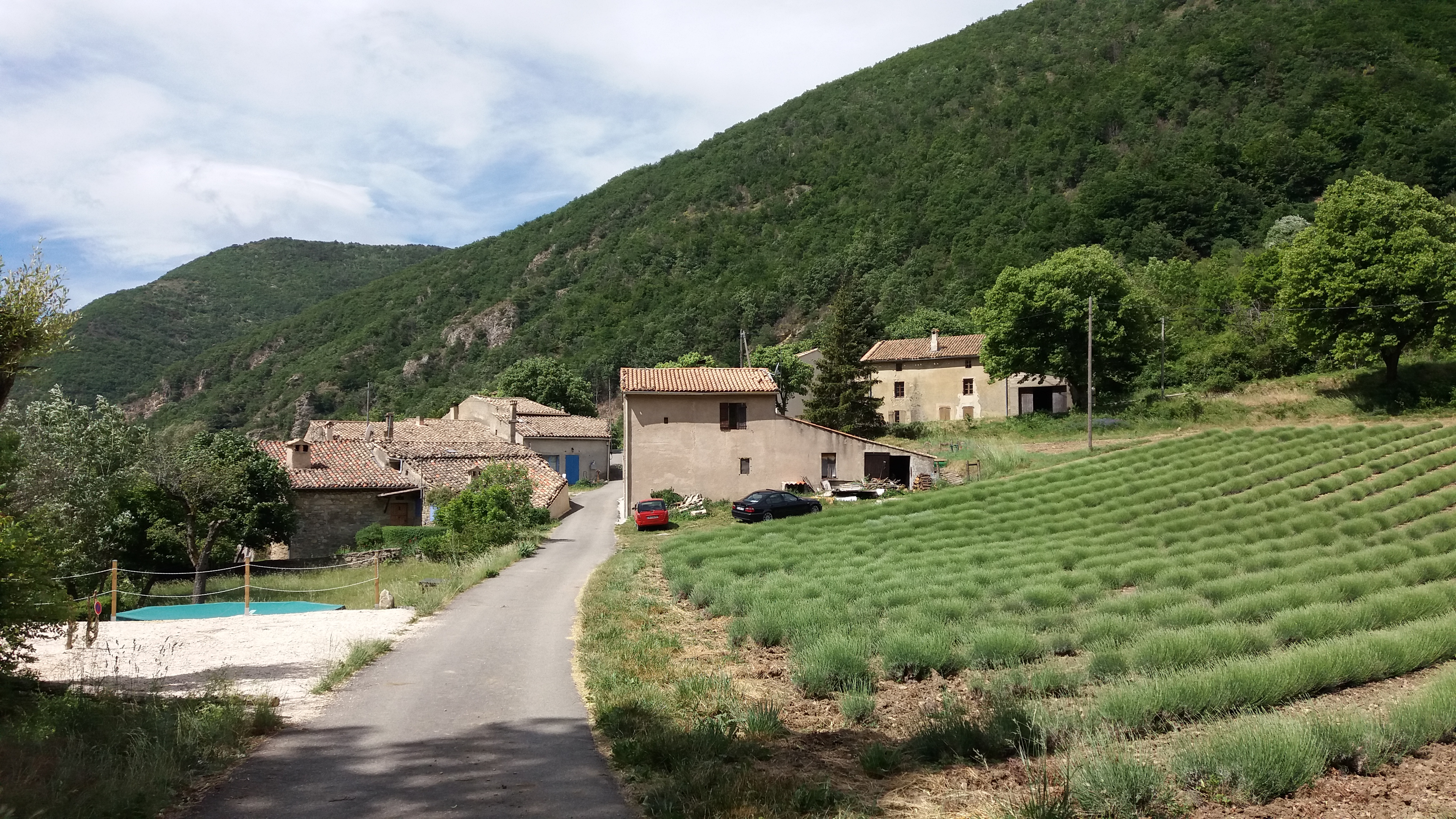
- Location of Chaudebonne
- Location within France Location within Auvergne-Rhône-Alpes
- Coordinates: 44°28′39″N 5°13′10″E
- Country: France
- Region: Auvergne-Rhône-Alpes
- Department: Drôme
- Arrondissement: Nyons
- Canton: Nyons et Baronnies

Government
  - Mayor (2020–2026): Jean-Michel Laget
- Area^{1}: 20.77 km^{2} (8.02 sq mi)
- Highest elevation: 1,600 m (5,200 ft)
- Lowest elevation: 542 m (1,778 ft)
- Population (2023): 58
  - Density: 2.8/km^{2} (7.2/sq mi)
- Time zone: UTC+01:00 (CET)
  - Summer (DST): UTC+02:00 (CEST)
- INSEE/Postal code: 26089 /26110
- ^{1} French Land Register data, which excludes lakes, ponds, glaciers > 1 km^{2} (0.386 sq mi or 247 acres) and river estuaries.

Chaudebonne (French pronunciation: [ʃodbɔn]; Occitan: Chaudabona) is a commune in the Drôme department in southeastern France.

== Population ==
Historical population
Year	Pop.	±% p.a.
1968	45	—
1975	35	−3.53%
1982	47	+4.30%
1990	48	+0.26%
1999	54	+1.32%
2007	61	+1.54%
2012	55	−2.05%
2017	56	+0.36%
2023	58	+0.59%
Source: INSEE

== See also ==
- Communes of the Drôme department
