= Propiac =

- Commune
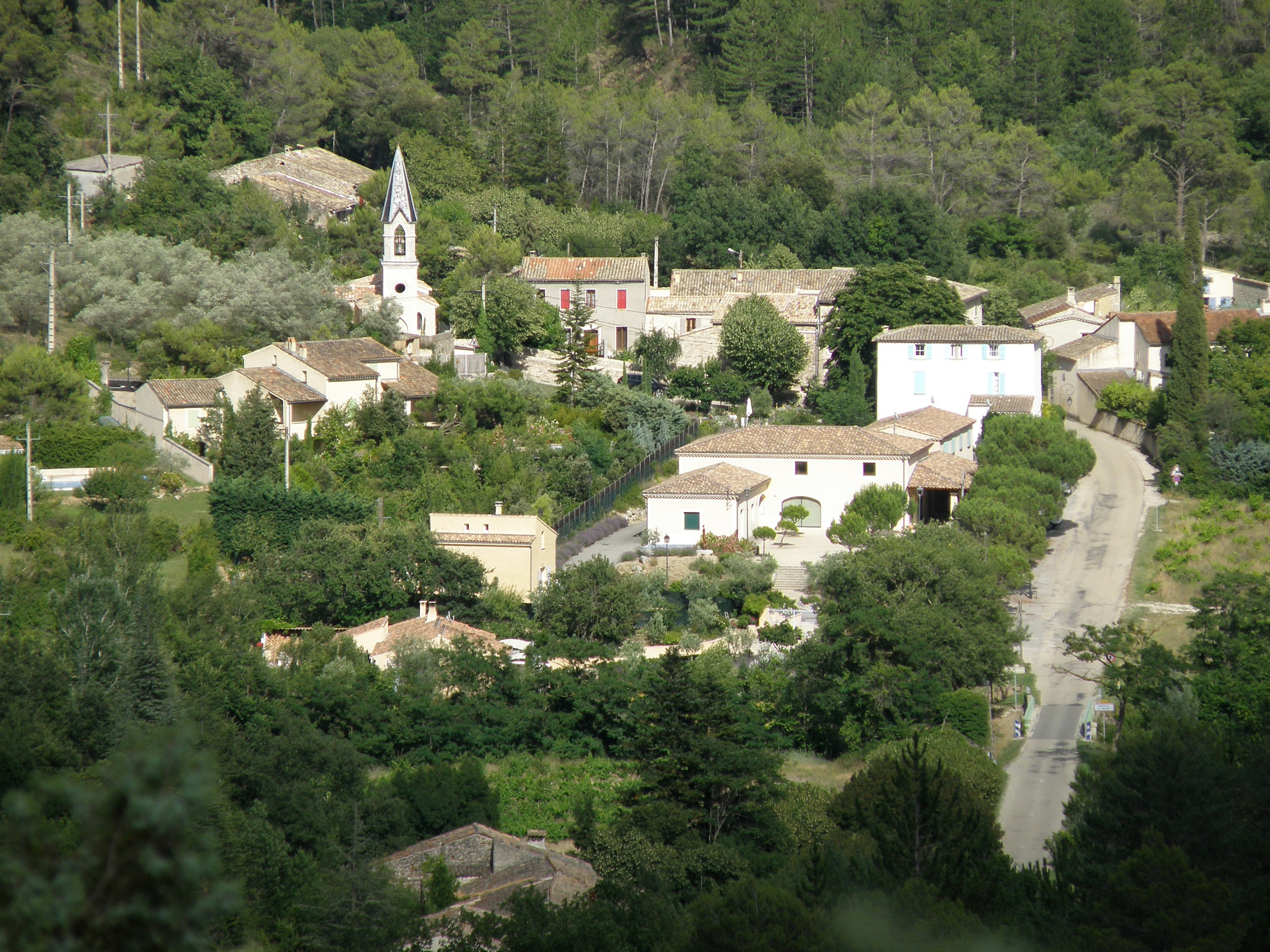
- A general view of Propiac
- Location of Propiac
- Location within France Location within Auvergne-Rhône-Alpes
- Coordinates: 44°16′43″N 5°11′57″E
- Country: France
- Region: Auvergne-Rhône-Alpes
- Department: Drôme
- Arrondissement: Nyons
- Canton: Nyons et Baronnies

Government
  - Mayor (2021–2026): Alan Pustoch
- Area^{1}: 11.15 km^{2} (4.31 sq mi)
- Highest elevation: 782 m (2,566 ft)
- Lowest elevation: 297 m (974 ft)
- Population (2023): 131
  - Density: 11.7/km^{2} (30.4/sq mi)
- Time zone: UTC+01:00 (CET)
  - Summer (DST): UTC+02:00 (CEST)
- INSEE/Postal code: 26256 /26170
- ^{1} French Land Register data, which excludes lakes, ponds, glaciers > 1 km^{2} (0.386 sq mi or 247 acres) and river estuaries.

Propiac (French pronunciation: [pʁɔpjak]) is a commune in the Drôme department in southeastern France.

== Population ==
Historical population
Year	Pop.	±% p.a.
1968	38	—
1975	49	+3.70%
1982	47	−0.59%
1990	60	+3.10%
1999	78	+2.96%
2007	108	+4.15%
2012	104	−0.75%
2017	131	+4.72%
2023	131	+0.00%
Source: INSEE

== See also ==
- Communes of the Drôme department
