= Le Poët-en-Percip =

- Commune
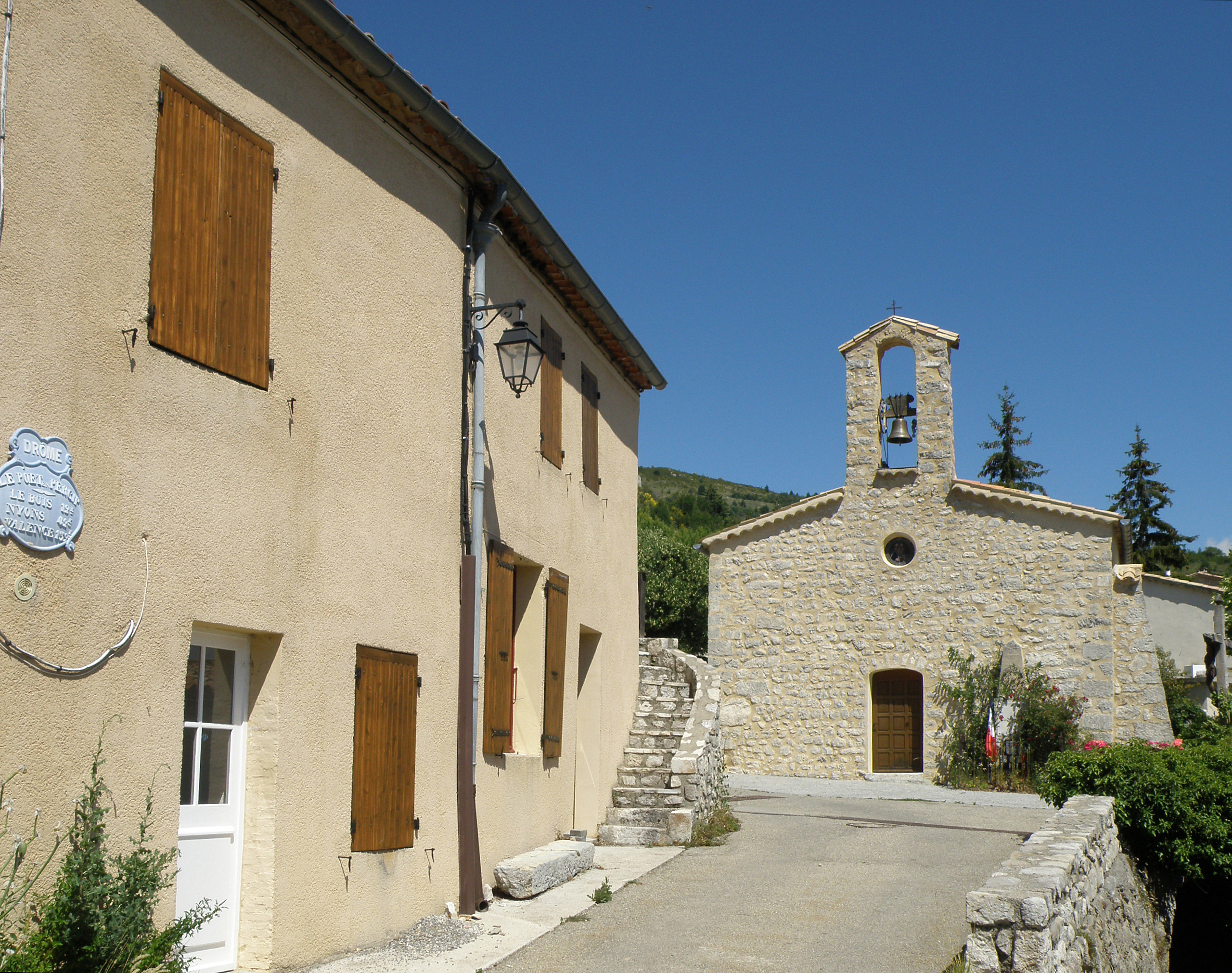
- The church of Saint-Simon, in Le Poët-en-Percip
- Location of Le Poët-en-Percip
- Location within France Location within Auvergne-Rhône-Alpes
- Coordinates: 44°15′19″N 5°23′33″E
- Country: France
- Region: Auvergne-Rhône-Alpes
- Department: Drôme
- Arrondissement: Nyons
- Canton: Nyons et Baronnies

Government
  - Mayor (2020–2026): Lionel Estève
- Area^{1}: 6.07 km^{2} (2.34 sq mi)
- Highest elevation: 1,340 m (4,400 ft)
- Lowest elevation: 791 m (2,595 ft)
- Population (2023): 25
  - Density: 4.1/km^{2} (11/sq mi)
- Time zone: UTC+01:00 (CET)
  - Summer (DST): UTC+02:00 (CEST)
- INSEE/Postal code: 26242 /26170
- ^{1} French Land Register data, which excludes lakes, ponds, glaciers > 1 km^{2} (0.386 sq mi or 247 acres) and river estuaries.

Le Poët-en-Percip (Occitan: Lo Poet de Percip) is a commune in the Drôme department in southeastern France.

== Population ==
Historical population
Year	Pop.	±% p.a.
1968	25	—
1975	19	−3.84%
1982	22	+2.12%
1990	17	−3.17%
1999	17	+0.00%
2007	19	+1.40%
2012	18	−1.08%
2017	17	−1.14%
2023	25	+6.64%
Source: INSEE

== See also ==
- Communes of the Drôme department
