= Vercoiran =

- Commune
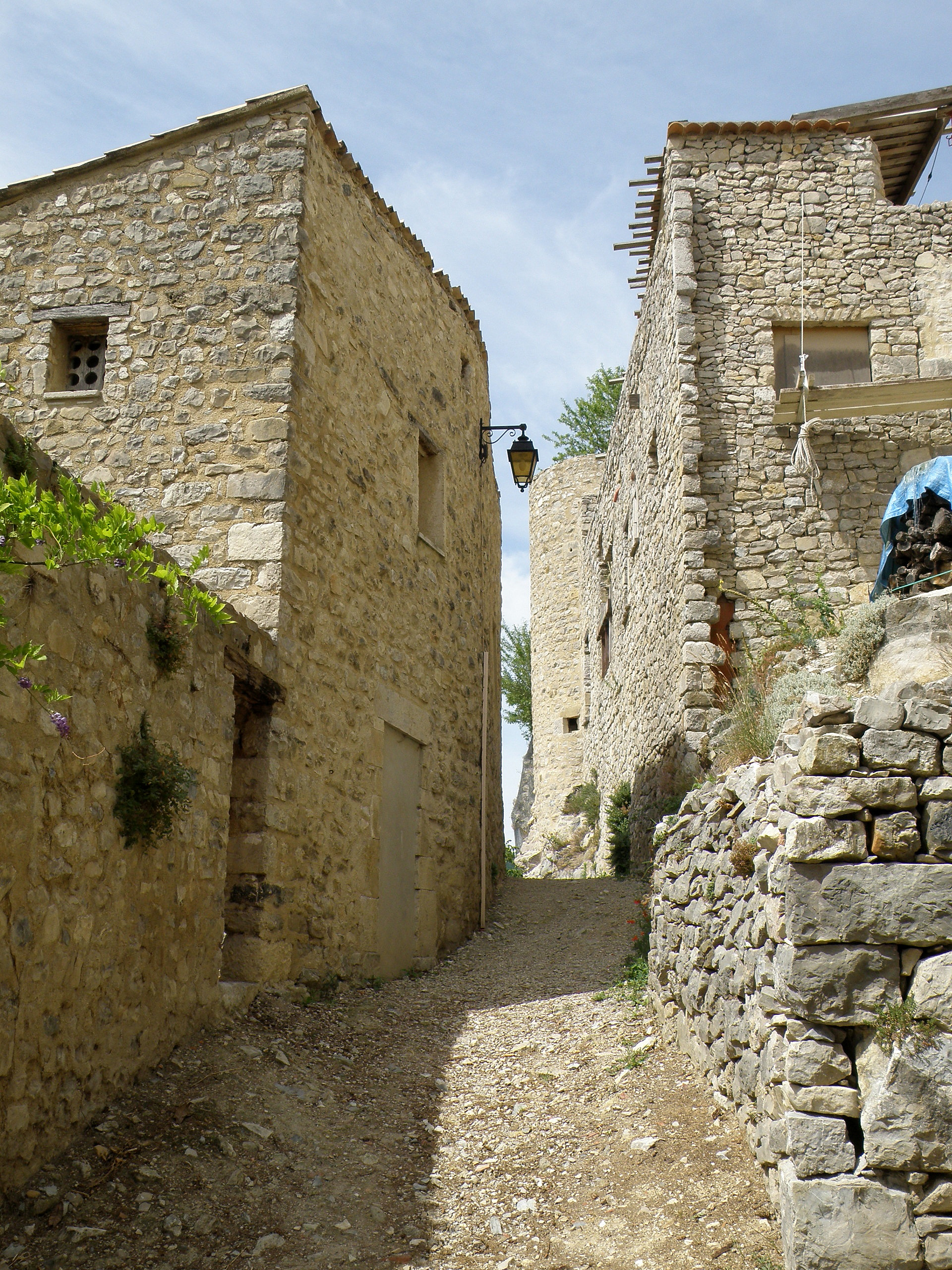
- An alleyway in the old village
- Location of Vercoiran
- Location within France Location within Auvergne-Rhône-Alpes
- Coordinates: 44°18′11″N 5°20′34″E
- Country: France
- Region: Auvergne-Rhône-Alpes
- Department: Drôme
- Arrondissement: Nyons
- Canton: Nyons et Baronnies

Government
  - Mayor (2020–2026): Gérard Pez
- Area^{1}: 19.95 km^{2} (7.70 sq mi)
- Elevation: 681 m (2,234 ft)
- Highest elevation: 1,302 m (4,272 ft)
- Lowest elevation: 465 m (1,526 ft)
- Population (2023): 130
  - Density: 6.5/km^{2} (17/sq mi)
- Time zone: UTC+01:00 (CET)
  - Summer (DST): UTC+02:00 (CEST)
- INSEE/Postal code: 26370 /26170
- ^{1} French Land Register data, which excludes lakes, ponds, glaciers > 1 km^{2} (0.386 sq mi or 247 acres) and river estuaries.

Vercoiran (French pronunciation: [vɛʁkwaʁɑ̃]) is a commune in the Drôme department in southeastern France.

== Population ==
Historical population
Year	Pop.	±% p.a.
1968	124	—
1975	98	−3.31%
1982	112	+1.93%
1990	129	+1.78%
1999	115	−1.27%
2007	124	+0.95%
2012	134	+1.56%
2017	141	+1.02%
2023	130	−1.34%
Source: INSEE

== See also ==
- Communes of the Drôme department
