= Eygaliers =

- Commune
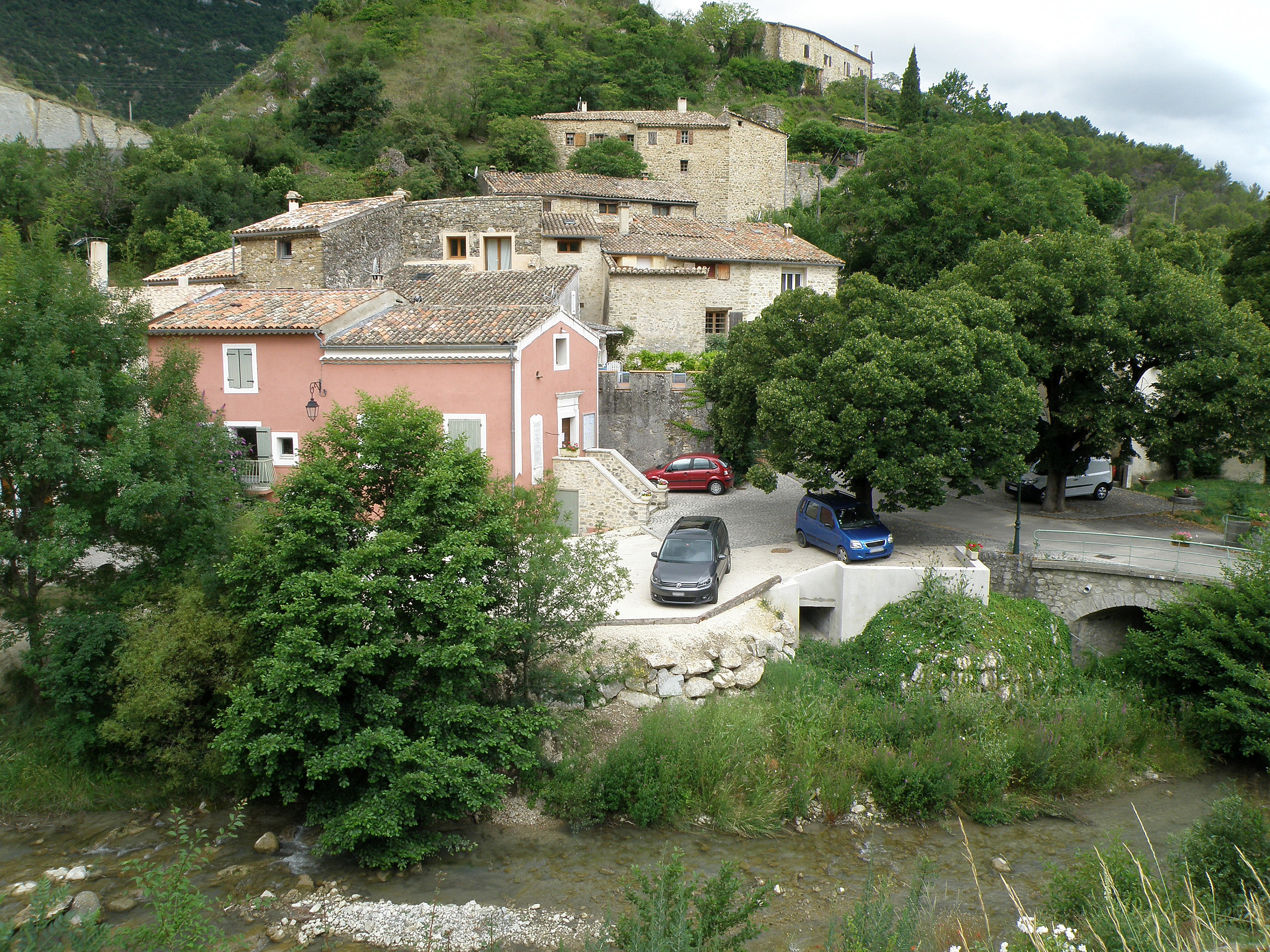
- A general view of Eygaliers
- Location of Eygaliers
- Location within France Location within Auvergne-Rhône-Alpes
- Coordinates: 44°14′24″N 5°16′51″E
- Country: France
- Region: Auvergne-Rhône-Alpes
- Department: Drôme
- Arrondissement: Nyons
- Canton: Nyons et Baronnies

Government
  - Mayor (2020–2026): Gerard Truphemus
- Area^{1}: 8.00 km^{2} (3.09 sq mi)
- Highest elevation: 1,160 m (3,810 ft)
- Lowest elevation: 354 m (1,161 ft)
- Population (2023): 139
  - Density: 17.4/km^{2} (45.0/sq mi)
- Time zone: UTC+01:00 (CET)
  - Summer (DST): UTC+02:00 (CEST)
- INSEE/Postal code: 26127 /26170
- ^{1} French Land Register data, which excludes lakes, ponds, glaciers > 1 km^{2} (0.386 sq mi or 247 acres) and river estuaries.

Eygaliers (French pronunciation: [ɛɡalje]; Occitan: Aigaliers) is a commune in the Drôme department in the Auvergne-Rhône-Alpes region in southeastern France.

== Population ==
Historical population
Year	Pop.	±% p.a.
1968	42	—
1975	45	+0.99%
1982	50	+1.52%
1990	64	+3.13%
1999	103	+5.43%
2007	137	+3.63%
2012	102	−5.73%
2017	104	+0.39%
2023	139	+4.95%
Source: INSEE

== See also ==
- Communes of the Drôme department
