= Saint-Avit, Drôme =

Saint-Avit
- Commune
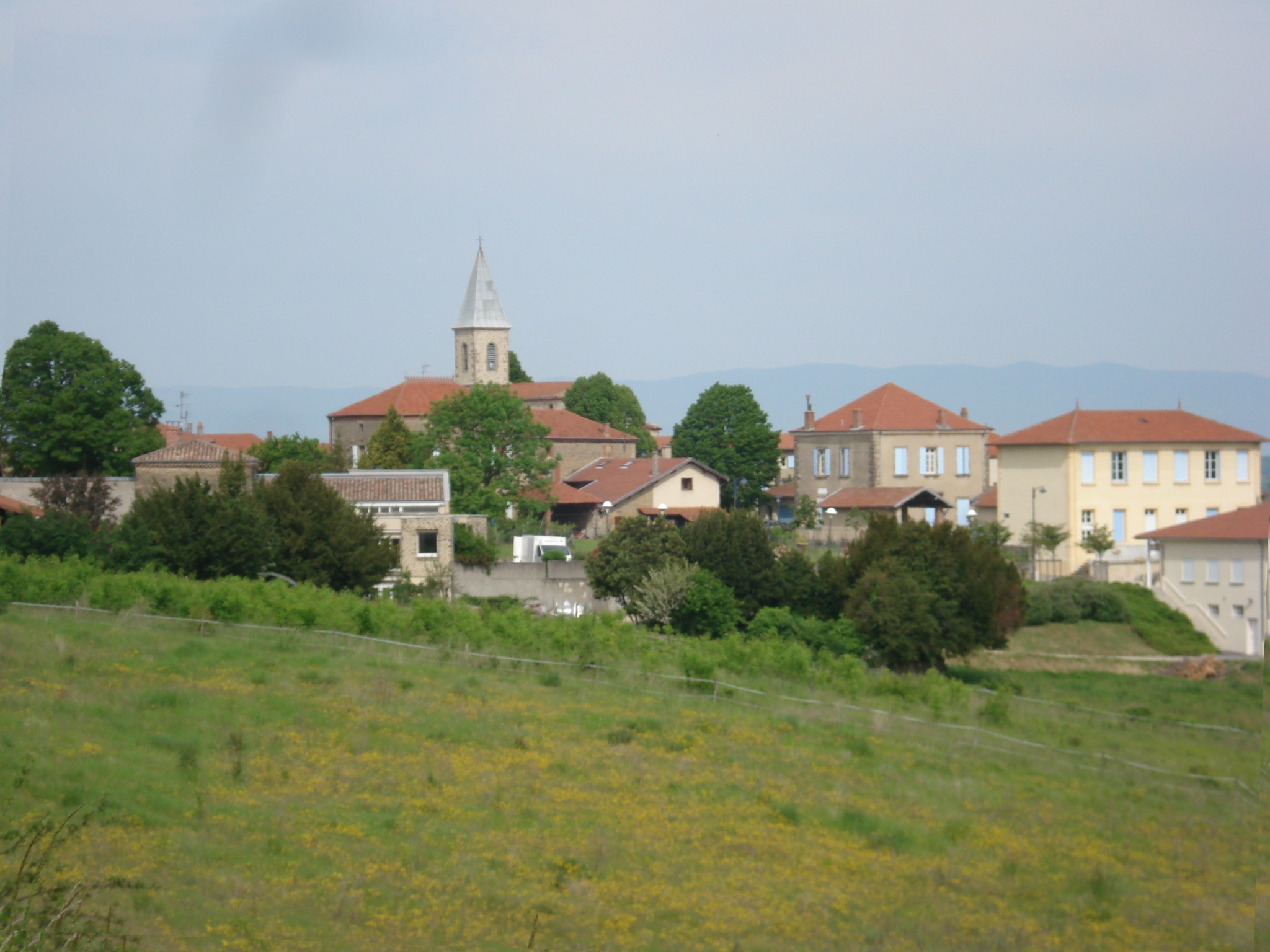
- A general view of Saint-Avit
- Location of Saint-Avit
- Location within France Location within Auvergne-Rhône-Alpes
- Coordinates: 45°11′51″N 4°58′14″E
- Country: France
- Region: Auvergne-Rhône-Alpes
- Department: Drôme
- Arrondissement: Valence
- Canton: Drôme des collines

Government
  - Mayor (2020–2026): Gérard Robert
- Area^{1}: 8.94 km^{2} (3.45 sq mi)
- Elevation: 348 m (1,142 ft)
- Highest elevation: 443 m (1,453 ft)
- Lowest elevation: 227 m (745 ft)
- Population (2023): 317
  - Density: 35.5/km^{2} (91.8/sq mi)
- Time zone: UTC+01:00 (CET)
  - Summer (DST): UTC+02:00 (CEST)
- INSEE/Postal code: 26293 /26330
- ^{1} French Land Register data, which excludes lakes, ponds, glaciers > 1 km^{2} (0.386 sq mi or 247 acres) and river estuaries.

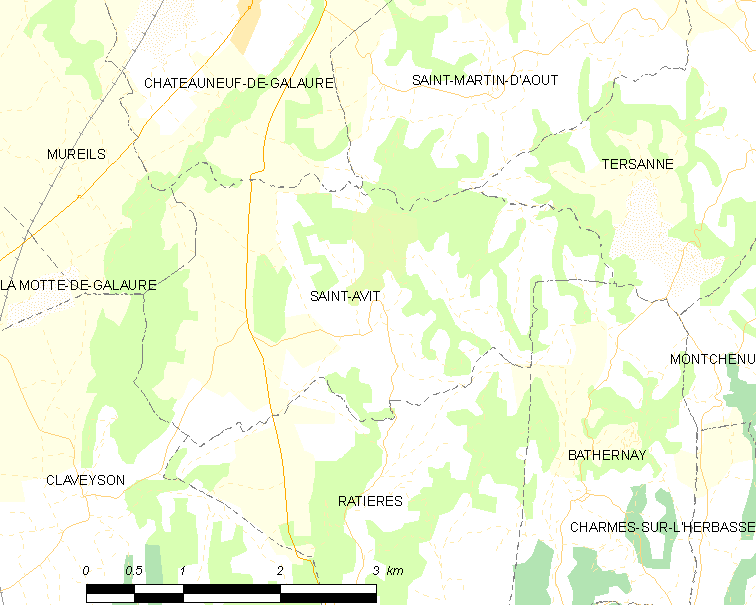
Map commune de Saint-Avit.

Saint-Avit is a commune in the Drôme department in southeastern France. Saint-Avit was detached from the municipality of Ratières on November 15, 1869 and is located 17 km east of Saint-Vallier (capital of the canton) and 10 km north of Saint-Donat-sur-l'Herbasse.

The surrounding communities are Ratières, Saint-Martin-d'Août, Bathernay, Châteauneuf-de-Galaure, Mureils and Claveyson.

== Population ==
Historical population

Year	Pop.	±% p.a.
1872	527	—
1891	487	−0.41%
1901	475	−0.25%
1911	419	−1.25%
1921	388	−0.77%
1931	341	−1.28%
1946	300	−0.85%
1962	311	+0.23%
1968	276	−1.97%

Year	Pop.	±% p.a.
1975	240	−1.98%
1982	231	−0.54%
1990	212	−1.07%
1999	242	+1.48%
2007	307	+3.02%
2012	298	−0.59%
2017	306	+0.53%
2023	317	+0.59%

Source: EHESS and INSEE (1968-2023)

== See also ==
- Communes of the Drôme department
