= Geyssans =

- Commune
- Coat of arms
- Location of Geyssans
- Location within France Location within Auvergne-Rhône-Alpes
- Coordinates: 45°07′20″N 5°05′40″E
- Country: France
- Region: Auvergne-Rhône-Alpes
- Department: Drôme
- Arrondissement: Valence
- Canton: Drôme des collines
- Intercommunality: CA Valence Romans Agglo

Government
  - Mayor (2020–2026): André Mege
- Area^{1}: 10.90 km^{2} (4.21 sq mi)
- Elevation: 435 m (1,427 ft)
- Highest elevation: 475 m (1,558 ft)
- Lowest elevation: 242 m (794 ft)
- Population (2023): 755
  - Density: 69.3/km^{2} (179/sq mi)
- Time zone: UTC+01:00 (CET)
  - Summer (DST): UTC+02:00 (CEST)
- INSEE/Postal code: 26140 /26750
- ^{1} French Land Register data, which excludes lakes, ponds, glaciers > 1 km^{2} (0.386 sq mi or 247 acres) and river estuaries.

Geyssans is a commune in the Drôme department in southeastern France.

== Location ==
It is located north of Génissieux, off the D52 which goes towards Saint-Michel-sur- Savasse, and Montmiral. The main road ends up in Reculais, a former commune now part of Arthémonay.

== Population ==
Historical population
Year	Pop.	±% p.a.
1968	261	—
1975	263	+0.11%
1982	308	+2.28%
1990	408	+3.58%
1999	468	+1.54%
2007	549	+2.02%
2012	675	+4.22%
2017	717	+1.21%
2023	755	+0.86%
Source: INSEE

== Sights ==
St Ange is an ancient chapel located at top of the hill in Geyssans, with a clear view over the Rhone valley and the Vercors Plateau.

== See also ==
- Communes of the Drôme department
- Official website of Geyssans
