= Arrondissement of Valence =

Coordinates: 44°55′23″N 4°53′12″E

Valence
- Arrondissement
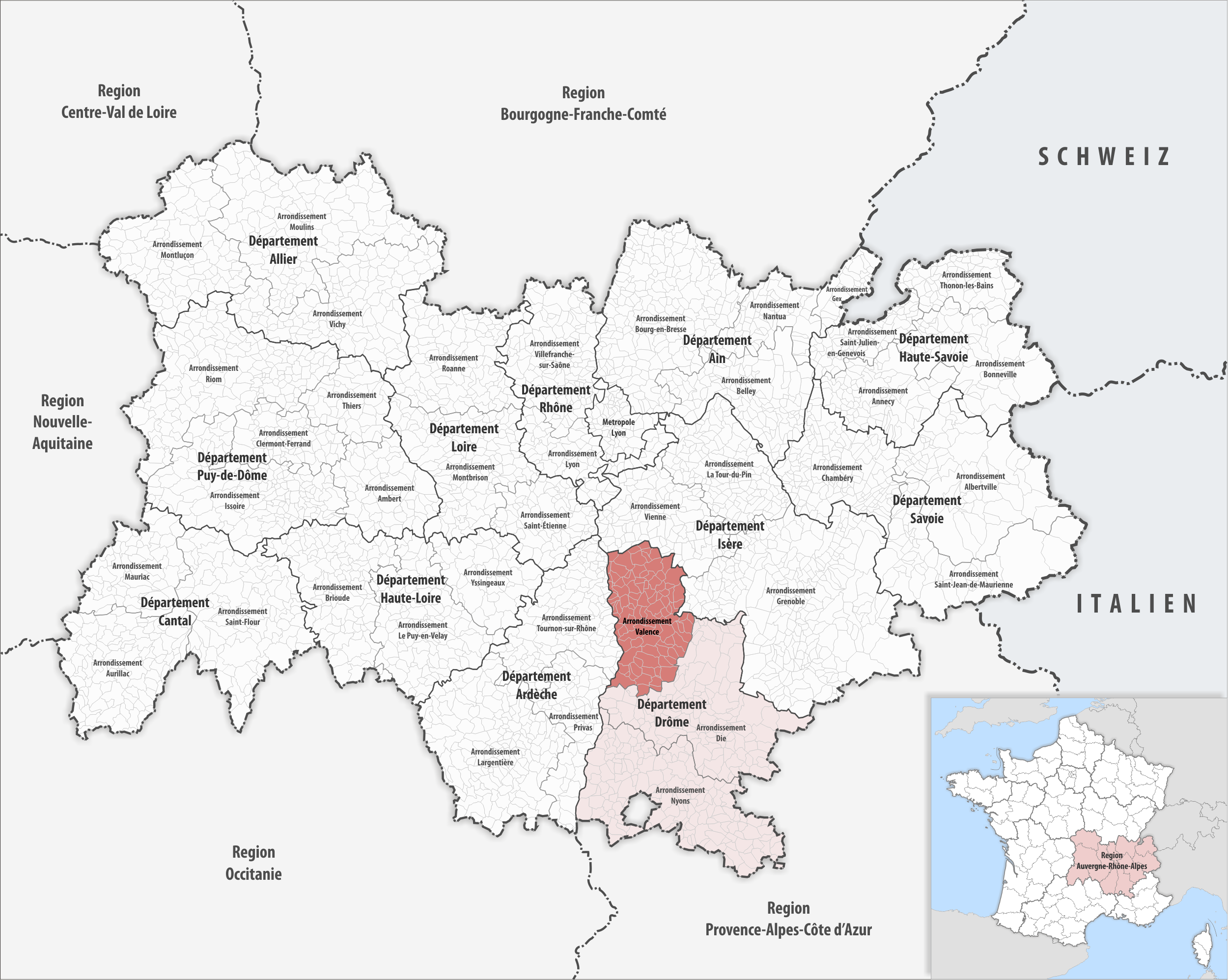
- Location within the region Auvergne-Rhône-Alpes
- Country: France
- Region: Auvergne-Rhône-Alpes
- Department: Drôme
- No. of communes: {{{nbcomm}}}
- Area: 1,516.3 km^{2} (585.4 sq mi)
- Population (2023): 301,045
  - Density: 198.54/km^{2} (514.21/sq mi)
- INSEE code: 263

The arrondissement of Valence is an arrondissement of France in the Drôme department in the Auvergne-Rhône-Alpes region. It has 101 communes. Its population is 298,095 (2021), and its area is 1,516.3 km^{2} (585.4 sq mi).

== Composition ==
The communes of the arrondissement of Valence, and their INSEE codes, are:

1. Albon (26002)
2. Alixan (26004)
3. Andancette (26009)
4. Anneyron (26010)
5. Arthémonay (26014)
6. Barbières (26023)
7. Barcelonne (26024)
8. Bathernay (26028)
9. La Baume-Cornillane (26032)
10. La Baume-d'Hostun (26034)
11. Beaumont-lès-Valence (26037)
12. Beaumont-Monteux (26038)
13. Beauregard-Baret (26039)
14. Beausemblant (26041)
15. Beauvallon (26042)
16. Bésayes (26049)
17. Bourg-de-Péage (26057)
18. Bourg-lès-Valence (26058)
19. Bren (26061)
20. Chabeuil (26064)
21. Le Chalon (26068)
22. Chanos-Curson (26071)
23. Chantemerle-les-Blés (26072)
24. Charmes-sur-l'Herbasse (26077)
25. Charpey (26079)
26. Châteaudouble (26081)
27. Châteauneuf-de-Galaure (26083)
28. Châteauneuf-sur-Isère (26084)
29. Châtillon-Saint-Jean (26087)
30. Chatuzange-le-Goubet (26088)
31. Chavannes (26092)
32. Claveyson (26094)
33. Clérieux (26096)
34. Combovin (26100)
35. Crépol (26107)
36. Crozes-Hermitage (26110)
37. Épinouze (26118)
38. Érôme (26119)
39. Étoile-sur-Rhône (26124)
40. Eymeux (26129)
41. Fay-le-Clos (26133)
42. Génissieux (26139)
43. Gervans (26380)
44. Geyssans (26140)
45. Le Grand-Serre (26143)
46. Granges-les-Beaumont (26379)
47. Hauterives (26148)
48. Hostun (26149)
49. Jaillans (26381)
50. Lapeyrouse-Mornay (26155)
51. Larnage (26156)
52. Laveyron (26160)
53. Lens-Lestang (26162)
54. Malissard (26170)
55. Manthes (26172)
56. Marches (26173)
57. Margès (26174)
58. Marsaz (26177)
59. Mercurol-Veaunes (26179)
60. Montchenu (26194)
61. Montéléger (26196)
62. Montélier (26197)
63. Montmeyran (26206)
64. Montmiral (26207)
65. Montvendre (26212)
66. Moras-en-Valloire (26213)
67. Mours-Saint-Eusèbe (26218)
68. Ourches (26224)
69. Parnans (26225)
70. Peyrins (26231)
71. Peyrus (26232)
72. Ponsas (26247)
73. Pont-de-l'Isère (26250)
74. Portes-lès-Valence (26252)
75. Ratières (26259)
76. La Roche-de-Glun (26271)
77. Rochefort-Samson (26273)
78. Romans-sur-Isère (26281)
79. Saint-Avit (26293)
80. Saint-Bardoux (26294)
81. Saint-Barthélemy-de-Vals (26295)
82. Saint-Christophe-et-le-Laris (26298)
83. Saint-Donat-sur-l'Herbasse (26301)
84. Saint-Jean-de-Galaure (26216)
85. Saint-Laurent-d'Onay (26310)
86. Saint-Marcel-lès-Valence (26313)
87. Saint-Martin-d'Août (26314)
88. Saint-Michel-sur-Savasse (26319)
89. Saint-Paul-lès-Romans (26323)
90. Saint-Rambert-d'Albon (26325)
91. Saint-Sorlin-en-Valloire (26330)
92. Saint-Uze (26332)
93. Saint-Vallier (26333)
94. Saint-Vincent-la-Commanderie (26382)
95. Serves-sur-Rhône (26341)
96. Tain-l'Hermitage (26347)
97. Tersanne (26349)
98. Triors (26355)
99. Upie (26358)
100. Valence (26362)
101. Valherbasse (26210)

== History ==
The arrondissement of Valence was created in 1800. In 2006 the four cantons of Dieulefit, Marsanne, Montélimar-1 and Montélimar-2 that previously belonged to the arrondissement of Valence were assigned to the arrondissement of Nyons. At the January 2017 reorganisation of the arrondissements of Drôme, it lost 17 communes to the arrondissement of Die and one commune to the arrondissement of Nyons, and it gained one commune from the arrondissement of Die.

As a result of the reorganisation of the cantons of France which came into effect in 2015, the borders of the cantons are no longer related to the borders of the arrondissements. The cantons of the arrondissement of Valence were, as of January 2015:

1. Bourg-de-Péage
2. Bourg-lès-Valence
3. Chabeuil
4. Le Grand-Serre
5. Loriol-sur-Drôme
6. Portes-lès-Valence
7. Romans-sur-Isère-1
8. Romans-sur-Isère-2
9. Saint-Donat-sur-l'Herbasse
10. Saint-Jean-en-Royans
11. Saint-Vallier
12. Tain-l'Hermitage
13. Valence-1
14. Valence-2
15. Valence-3
16. Valence-4
