= Margès =

- Commune
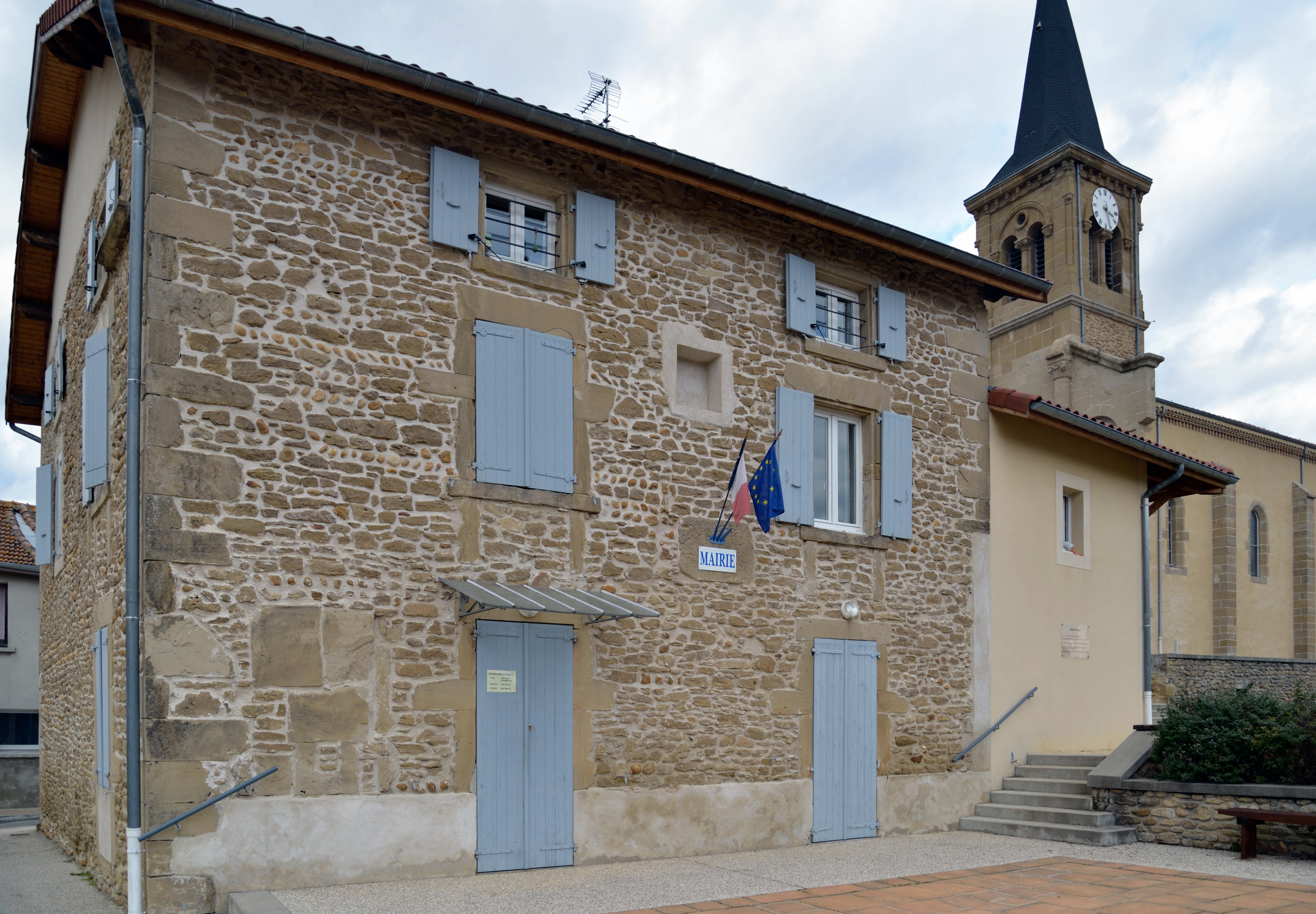
- Town hall

- Coat of arms
- Location of Margès
- Location within France Location within Auvergne-Rhône-Alpes
- Coordinates: 45°08′52″N 5°02′11″E
- Country: France
- Region: Auvergne-Rhône-Alpes
- Department: Drôme
- Arrondissement: Valence
- Canton: Drôme des collines
- Intercommunality: CA Arche Agglo

Government
  - Mayor (2020–2026): Jean-Louis Morin
- Area^{1}: 9.79 km^{2} (3.78 sq mi)
- Elevation: 245 m (804 ft)
- Highest elevation: 344 m (1,129 ft)
- Lowest elevation: 216 m (709 ft)
- Population (2023): 1,067
  - Density: 109/km^{2} (282/sq mi)
- Time zone: UTC+01:00 (CET)
  - Summer (DST): UTC+02:00 (CEST)
- INSEE/Postal code: 26174 /26260
- ^{1} French Land Register data, which excludes lakes, ponds, glaciers > 1 km^{2} (0.386 sq mi or 247 acres) and river estuaries.

Margès (French pronunciation: [maʁʒɛs]; Occitan: Marjais) is a commune in the Drôme department in southeastern France.

== Population ==
Historical population
Year	Pop.	±% p.a.
1968	370	—
1975	373	+0.12%
1982	444	+2.52%
1990	532	+2.29%
1999	723	+3.47%
2007	850	+2.04%
2012	1,006	+3.43%
2017	1,159	+2.87%
2023	1,067	−1.37%
Source: INSEE

== See also ==
- Communes of the Drôme department
