= Saint-Laurent-d'Onay =

- Commune
- Location of Saint-Laurent-d'Onay
- Location within France Location within Auvergne-Rhône-Alpes
- Coordinates: 45°11′N 5°06′E
- Country: France
- Region: Auvergne-Rhône-Alpes
- Department: Drôme
- Arrondissement: Valence
- Canton: Drôme des collines
- Intercommunality: CA Valence Romans Agglo

Government
  - Mayor (2020–2026): Nadine Chevrol
- Area^{1}: 6.28 km^{2} (2.42 sq mi)
- Elevation: 410 m (1,350 ft)
- Highest elevation: 507 m (1,663 ft)
- Lowest elevation: 317 m (1,040 ft)
- Population (2023): 158
  - Density: 25.2/km^{2} (65.2/sq mi)
- Time zone: UTC+01:00 (CET)
  - Summer (DST): UTC+02:00 (CEST)
- INSEE/Postal code: 26310 /26350
- ^{1} French Land Register data, which excludes lakes, ponds, glaciers > 1 km^{2} (0.386 sq mi or 247 acres) and river estuaries.

Saint-Laurent-d'Onay (French pronunciation: [sɛ̃ loʁɑ̃ dɔnɛ]; Arpitan: Sent-Lôrent-dʼÔnê) is a commune in the Drôme department in southeastern France.

== Population ==
Historical population
| Year | Pop. | ±% p.a. |
|---|---|---|
| 1968 | 120 | — |
| 1975 | 98 | −2.85% |
| 1982 | 92 | −0.90% |
| 1990 | 111 | +2.37% |
| 1999 | 107 | −0.41% |
| 2007 | 129 | +2.36% |
| 2012 | 148 | +2.79% |
| 2017 | 154 | +0.80% |
| 2023 | 158 | +0.43% |
Source: INSEE

== See also ==
- Communes of the Drôme department
