= Le Chalon =

- Commune
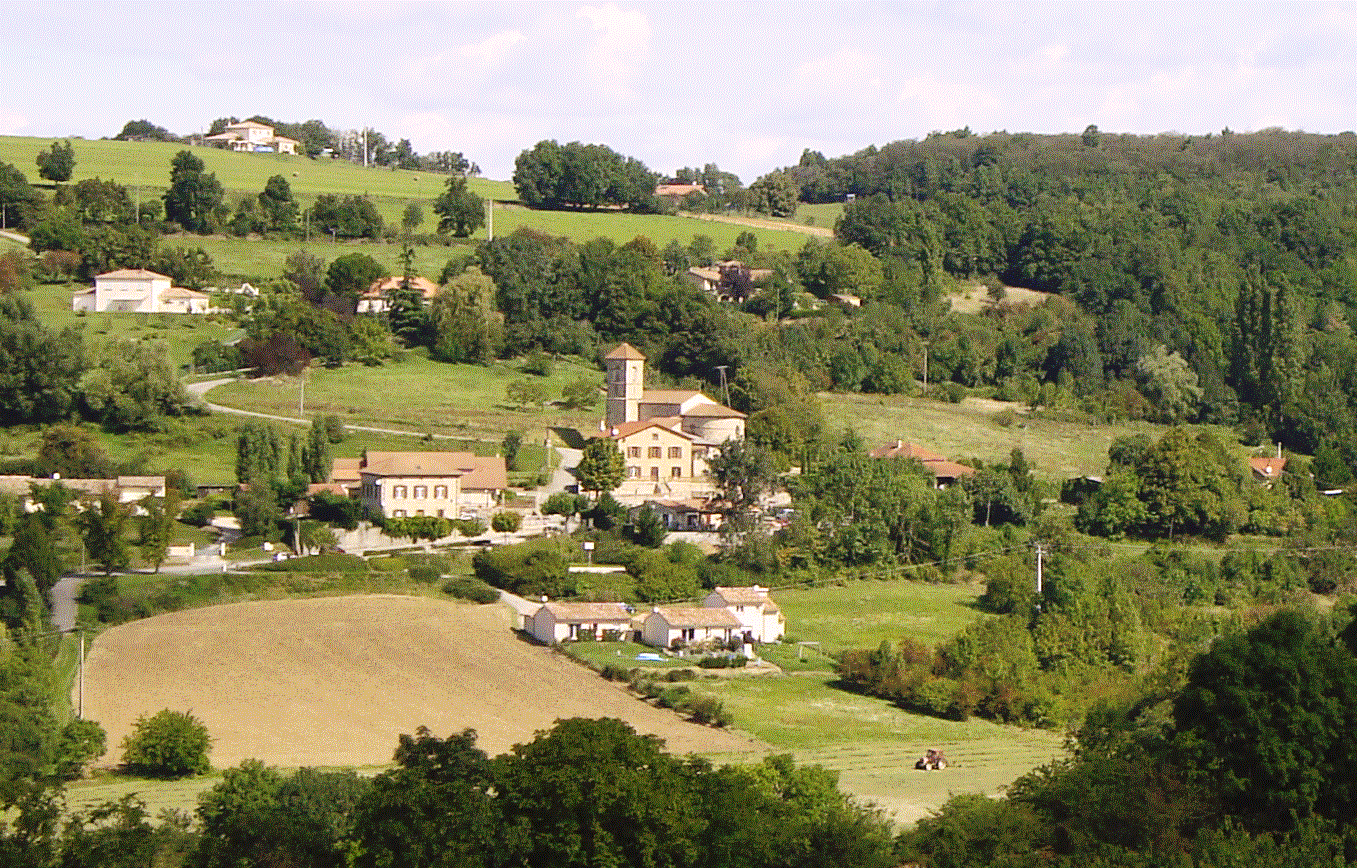
- A general view of Le Chalon
- Location of Le Chalon
- Location within France Location within Auvergne-Rhône-Alpes
- Coordinates: 45°09′23″N 5°05′21″E
- Country: France
- Region: Auvergne-Rhône-Alpes
- Department: Drôme
- Arrondissement: Valence
- Canton: Drôme des collines
- Intercommunality: CA Valence Romans Agglo

Government
  - Mayor (2020–2026): François Caumes
- Area^{1}: 8.38 km^{2} (3.24 sq mi)
- Elevation: 494 m (1,621 ft)
- Highest elevation: 485 m (1,591 ft)
- Lowest elevation: 277 m (909 ft)
- Population (2023): 200
  - Density: 24/km^{2} (62/sq mi)
- Time zone: UTC+01:00 (CET)
  - Summer (DST): UTC+02:00 (CEST)
- INSEE/Postal code: 26068 /26350
- ^{1} French Land Register data, which excludes lakes, ponds, glaciers > 1 km^{2} (0.386 sq mi or 247 acres) and river estuaries.

Le Chalon (French pronunciation: [lə ʃalɔ̃]) is a commune in the Drôme department in southeastern France.

== Population ==
Historical population
Year	Pop.	±% p.a.
1968	138	—
1975	129	−0.96%
1982	132	+0.33%
1990	147	+1.35%
1999	157	+0.73%
2007	175	+1.37%
2012	216	+4.30%
2017	211	−0.47%
2023	200	−0.89%
Source: INSEE

== See also ==
- Communes of the Drôme department
