= Bren, Drôme =

Bren
- Commune
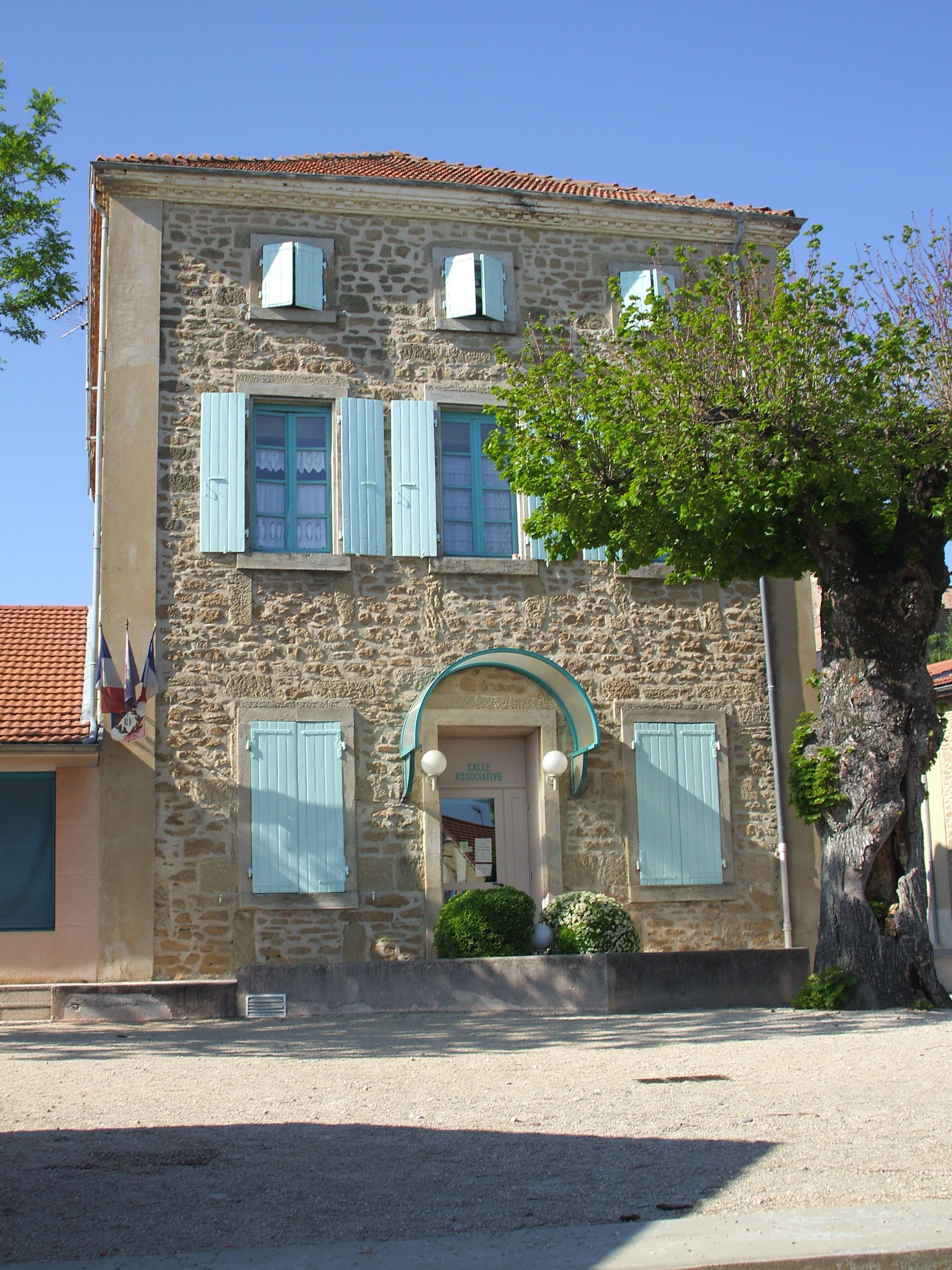
- Town hall
- Location of Bren
- Location within France Location within Auvergne-Rhône-Alpes
- Coordinates: 45°08′10″N 4°56′56″E
- Country: France
- Region: Auvergne-Rhône-Alpes
- Department: Drôme
- Arrondissement: Valence
- Canton: Drôme des collines
- Intercommunality: CA Arche Agglo

Government
  - Mayor (2020–2026): Serge Debrie
- Area^{1}: 11.03 km^{2} (4.26 sq mi)
- Elevation: 330 m (1,080 ft)
- Highest elevation: 403 m (1,322 ft)
- Lowest elevation: 217 m (712 ft)
- Population (2023): 709
  - Density: 64.3/km^{2} (166/sq mi)
- Time zone: UTC+01:00 (CET)
  - Summer (DST): UTC+02:00 (CEST)
- INSEE/Postal code: 26061 /26260
- ^{1} French Land Register data, which excludes lakes, ponds, glaciers > 1 km^{2} (0.386 sq mi or 247 acres) and river estuaries.

Bren is a commune in the Drôme department in southeastern France.

== Population ==
Historical population
Year	Pop.	±% p.a.
1968	273	—
1975	281	+0.41%
1982	376	+4.25%
1990	431	+1.72%
1999	471	+0.99%
2007	534	+1.58%
2012	536	+0.07%
2017	563	+0.99%
2023	709	+3.92%
Source: INSEE

== See also ==
- Communes of the Drôme department
