= Marsaz =

- Commune
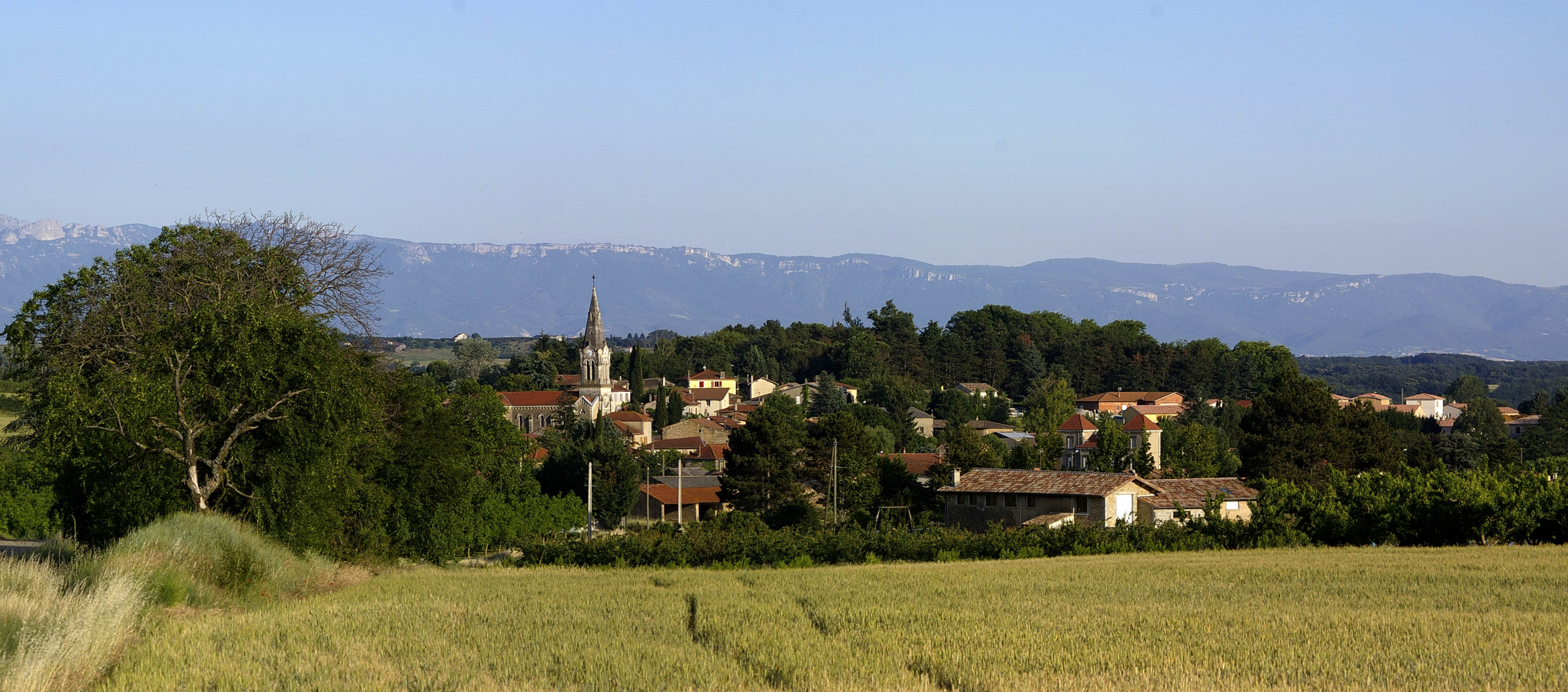
- A general view of Marsaz
- Location of Marsaz
- Location within France Location within Auvergne-Rhône-Alpes
- Coordinates: 45°07′05″N 4°56′37″E
- Country: France
- Region: Auvergne-Rhône-Alpes
- Department: Drôme
- Arrondissement: Valence
- Canton: Drôme des collines
- Intercommunality: CA Arche Agglo

Government
  - Mayor (2020–2026): Gilles Florent
- Area^{1}: 8.95 km^{2} (3.46 sq mi)
- Elevation: 281 m (922 ft)
- Highest elevation: 293 m (961 ft)
- Lowest elevation: 184 m (604 ft)
- Population (2023): 714
  - Density: 79.8/km^{2} (207/sq mi)
- Time zone: UTC+01:00 (CET)
  - Summer (DST): UTC+02:00 (CEST)
- INSEE/Postal code: 26177 /26260
- ^{1} French Land Register data, which excludes lakes, ponds, glaciers > 1 km^{2} (0.386 sq mi or 247 acres) and river estuaries.

Marsaz is a commune in the Drôme department in southeastern France.

== Population ==
Historical population
| Year | Pop. | ±% p.a. |
|---|---|---|
| 1968 | 381 | — |
| 1975 | 338 | −1.70% |
| 1982 | 428 | +3.43% |
| 1990 | 469 | +1.15% |
| 1999 | 502 | +0.76% |
| 2007 | 616 | +2.59% |
| 2012 | 740 | +3.74% |
| 2017 | 761 | +0.56% |
| 2023 | 714 | −1.06% |
Source: INSEE

== See also ==
- Communes of the Drôme department
