= Charmes-sur-l'Herbasse =

- Commune
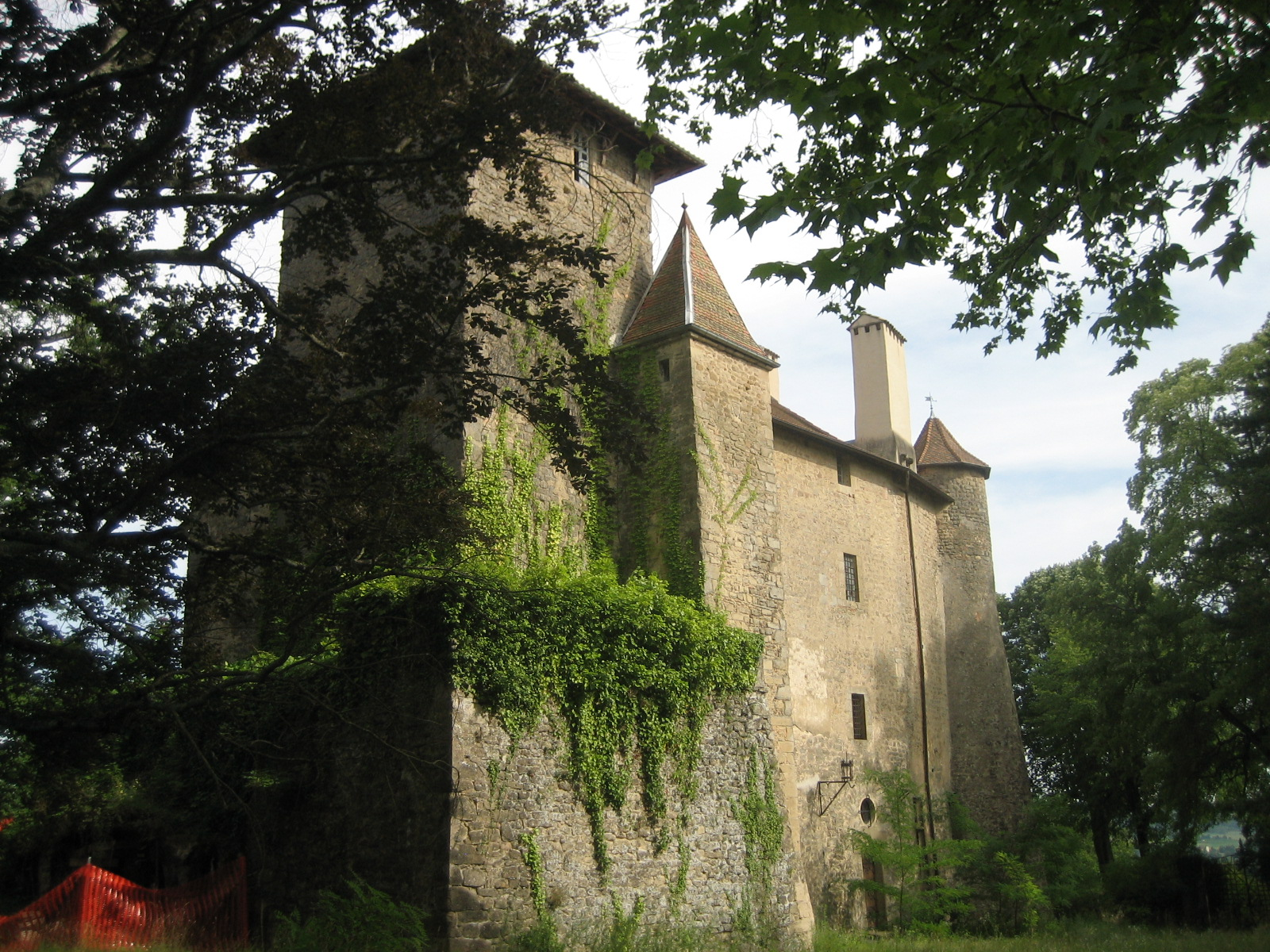
- Medieval castle

- Coat of arms
- Location of Charmes-sur-l'Herbasse
- Location within France Location within Auvergne-Rhône-Alpes
- Coordinates: 45°08′57″N 5°01′01″E
- Country: France
- Region: Auvergne-Rhône-Alpes
- Department: Drôme
- Arrondissement: Valence
- Canton: Drôme des collines
- Intercommunality: CA Arche Agglo

Government
  - Mayor (2020–2026): Stéphanie Nouguier
- Area^{1}: 12.84 km^{2} (4.96 sq mi)
- Elevation: 251 m (823 ft)
- Highest elevation: 426 m (1,398 ft)
- Lowest elevation: 224 m (735 ft)
- Population (2023): 806
  - Density: 62.8/km^{2} (163/sq mi)
- Time zone: UTC+01:00 (CET)
  - Summer (DST): UTC+02:00 (CEST)
- INSEE/Postal code: 26077 /26260
- ^{1} French Land Register data, which excludes lakes, ponds, glaciers > 1 km^{2} (0.386 sq mi or 247 acres) and river estuaries.

Charmes-sur-l'Herbasse (French pronunciation: [ʃaʁm syʁ lɛʁbas]; Occitan: Charmas d'Erbaça) is a commune of the Drôme department in southeastern France.

== Population ==
Historical population
Year	Pop.	±% p.a.
1968	455	—
1975	449	−0.19%
1982	530	+2.40%
1990	631	+2.20%
1999	713	+1.37%
2007	855	+2.30%
2012	920	+1.48%
2017	927	+0.15%
2023	806	−2.30%
Source: INSEE

== See also ==
- Communes of the Drôme department
