= Épinouze =

- Commune
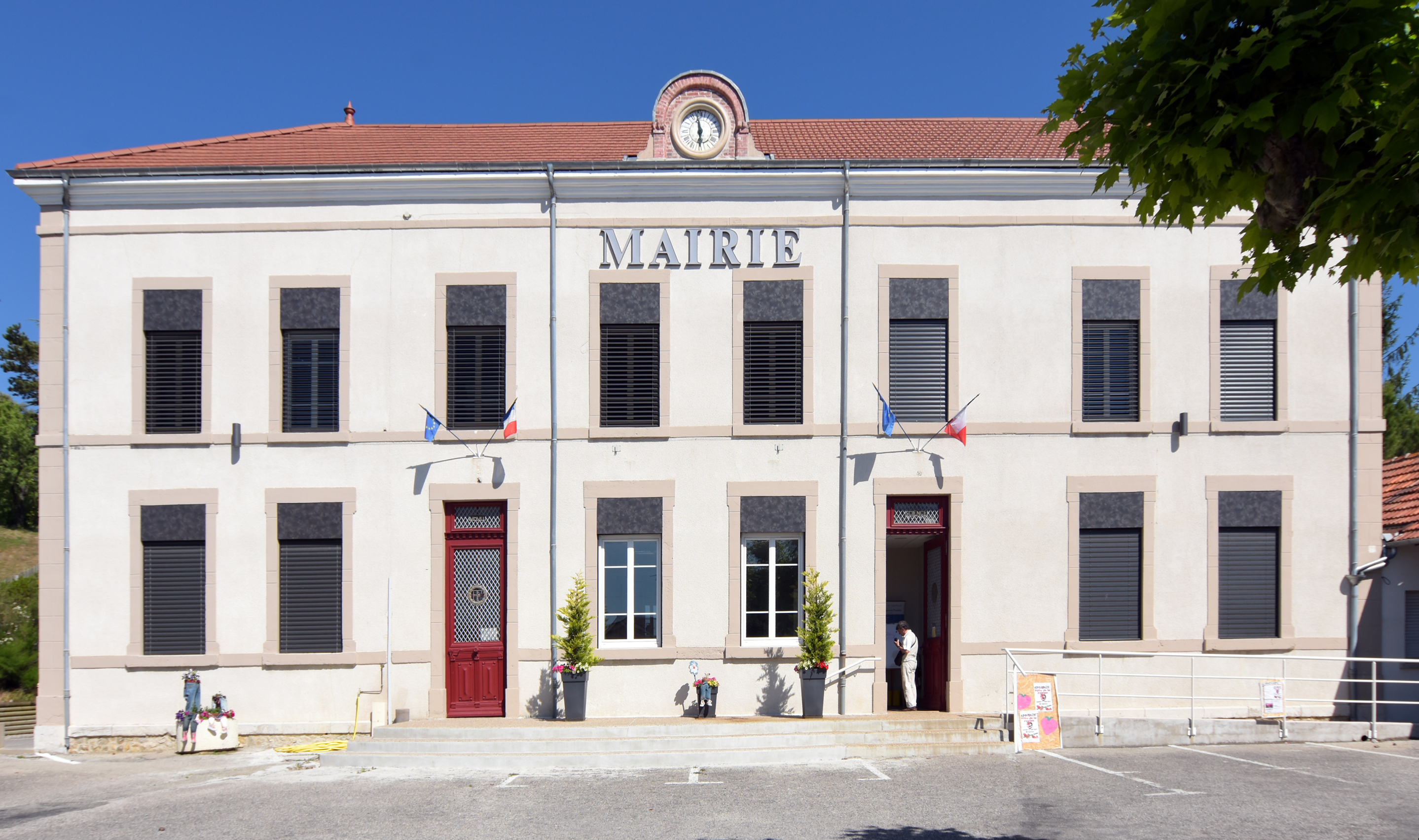
- Town hall
- Location of Épinouze
- Location within France Location within Auvergne-Rhône-Alpes
- Coordinates: 45°18′36″N 4°55′42″E
- Country: France
- Region: Auvergne-Rhône-Alpes
- Department: Drôme
- Arrondissement: Valence
- Canton: Drôme des collines

Government
  - Mayor (2020–2026): Yves Lafaury
- Area^{1}: 11.21 km^{2} (4.33 sq mi)
- Elevation: 215 m (705 ft)
- Highest elevation: 248 m (814 ft)
- Lowest elevation: 191 m (627 ft)
- Population (2023): 1,531
  - Density: 136.6/km^{2} (353.7/sq mi)
- Time zone: UTC+01:00 (CET)
  - Summer (DST): UTC+02:00 (CEST)
- INSEE/Postal code: 26118 /26210
- ^{1} French Land Register data, which excludes lakes, ponds, glaciers > 1 km^{2} (0.386 sq mi or 247 acres) and river estuaries.

Épinouze (French pronunciation: [epinuz]) is a commune in the Drôme department in the Auvergne-Rhône-Alpes region in southeastern France.

== Population ==
Historical population
Year	Pop.	±% p.a.
1968	981	—
1975	968	−0.19%
1982	956	−0.18%
1990	968	+0.16%
1999	1,096	+1.39%
2007	1,272	+1.88%
2012	1,537	+3.86%
2017	1,521	−0.21%
2023	1,531	+0.11%
Source: INSEE

== See also ==
- Communes of the Drôme department
