= Chavannes, Drôme =

Chavannes
- Commune
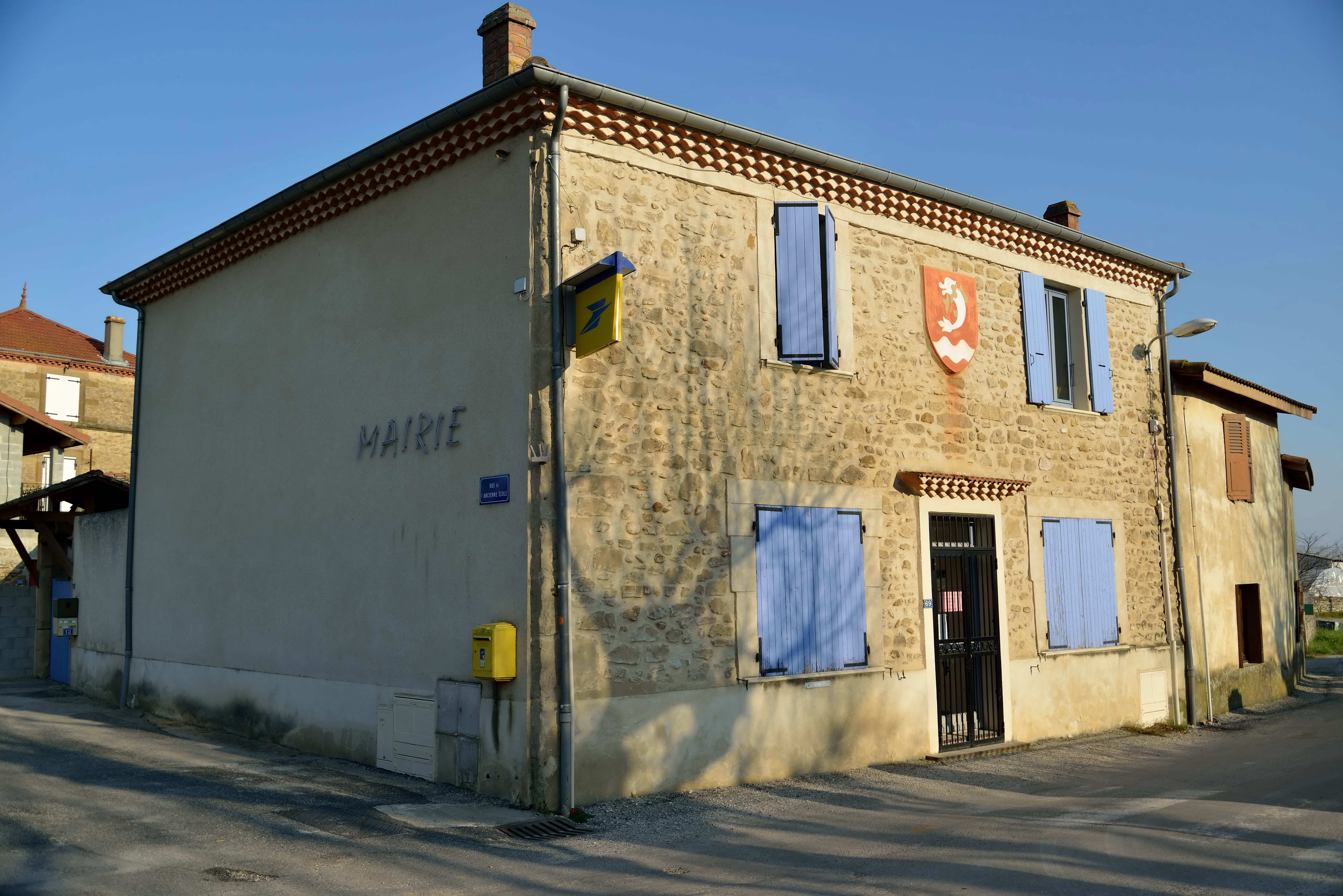
- The town hall of Chavannes

- Coat of arms
- Location of Chavannes
- Location within France Location within Auvergne-Rhône-Alpes
- Coordinates: 45°06′21″N 4°55′41″E
- Country: France
- Region: Auvergne-Rhône-Alpes
- Department: Drôme
- Arrondissement: Valence
- Canton: Drôme des collines
- Intercommunality: CA Arche Agglo

Government
  - Mayor (2020–2026): Jacques Pochon
- Area^{1}: 4.67 km^{2} (1.80 sq mi)
- Elevation: 206 m (676 ft)
- Highest elevation: 238 m (781 ft)
- Lowest elevation: 176 m (577 ft)
- Population (2023): 768
  - Density: 164/km^{2} (426/sq mi)
- Time zone: UTC+01:00 (CET)
  - Summer (DST): UTC+02:00 (CEST)
- INSEE/Postal code: 26092 /26260
- ^{1} French Land Register data, which excludes lakes, ponds, glaciers > 1 km^{2} (0.386 sq mi or 247 acres) and river estuaries.

Chavannes (French pronunciation: [ʃavan]; Vivaro-Alpine: Chavana) is a commune in the Drôme department in southeastern France.

== Population ==
Historical population
Year	Pop.	±% p.a.
1968	285	—
1975	283	−0.10%
1982	316	+1.59%
1990	374	+2.13%
1999	430	+1.56%
2007	447	+0.49%
2012	579	+5.31%
2017	710	+4.16%
2023	768	+1.32%
Source: INSEE

== See also ==
- Communes of the Drôme department
