= Canton of Drôme des collines =

Coordinates: 45.12°N 4.98°E

The canton of Drôme des collines is an administrative division of the Drôme department, southeastern France. It was created at the French canton reorganisation which came into effect in March 2015. Its seat is in Saint-Donat-sur-l'Herbasse.

It consists of the following communes:

1. Arthémonay
2. Bathernay
3. Bren
4. Le Chalon
5. Charmes-sur-l'Herbasse
6. Châteauneuf-de-Galaure
7. Chavannes
8. Crépol
9. Épinouze
10. Geyssans
11. Le Grand-Serre
12. Hauterives
13. Lapeyrouse-Mornay
14. Lens-Lestang
15. Manthes
16. Margès
17. Marsaz
18. Montchenu
19. Montmiral
20. Moras-en-Valloire
21. Parnans
22. Ratières
23. Saint-Avit
24. Saint-Christophe-et-le-Laris
25. Saint-Donat-sur-l'Herbasse
26. Saint-Laurent-d'Onay
27. Saint-Martin-d'Août
28. Saint-Michel-sur-Savasse
29. Saint-Sorlin-en-Valloire
30. Tersanne
31. Valherbasse
