= Montchenu =

- Commune
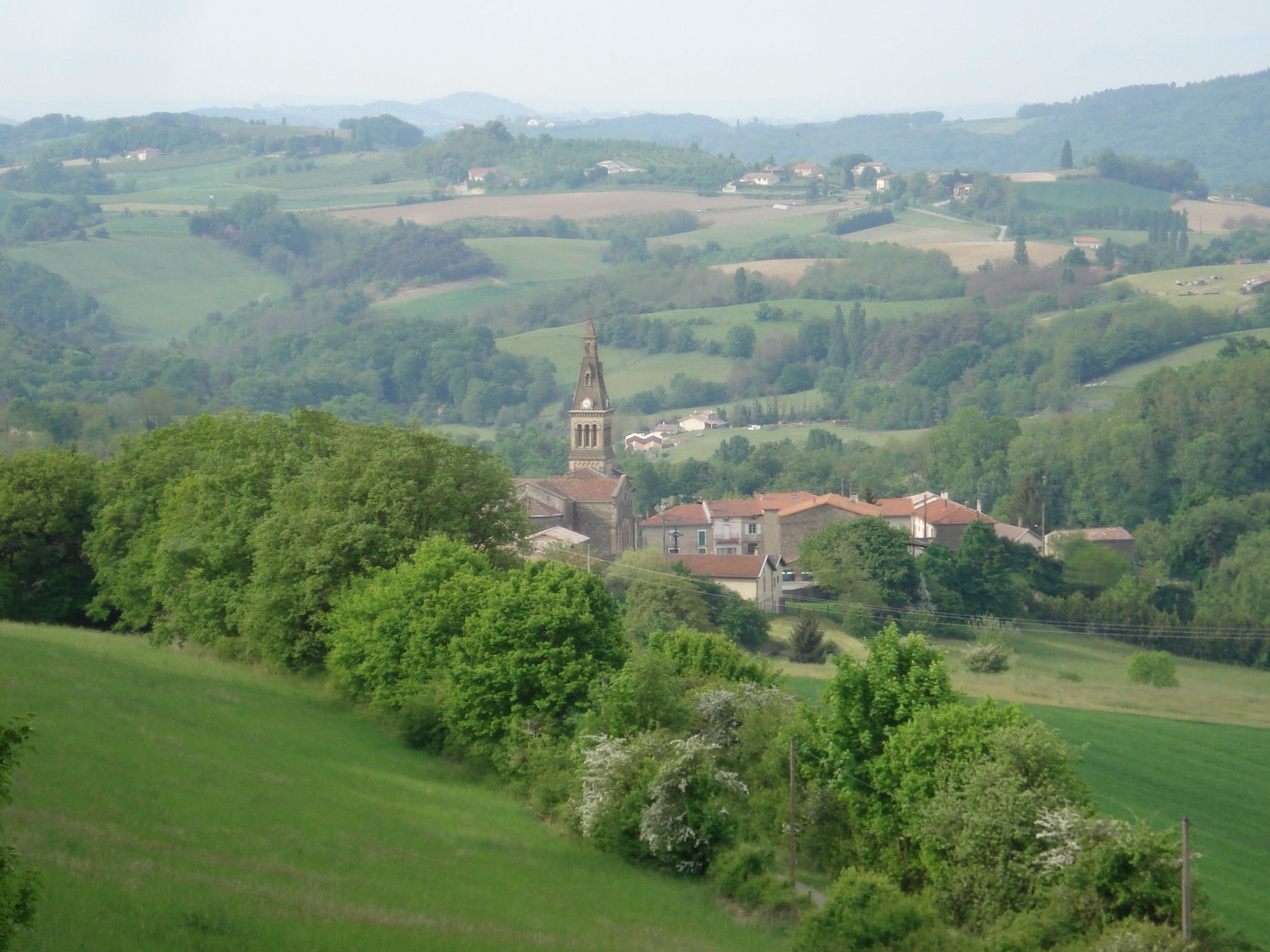
- A general view of Montchenu
- Location of Montchenu
- Location within France Location within Auvergne-Rhône-Alpes
- Coordinates: 45°11′47″N 5°01′57″E
- Country: France
- Region: Auvergne-Rhône-Alpes
- Department: Drôme
- Arrondissement: Valence
- Canton: Drôme des collines
- Intercommunality: CA Arche Agglo

Government
  - Mayor (2020–2026): Roger Vossier
- Area^{1}: 16.15 km^{2} (6.24 sq mi)
- Elevation: 175 m (574 ft)
- Highest elevation: 489 m (1,604 ft)
- Lowest elevation: 263 m (863 ft)
- Population (2023): 605
  - Density: 37.5/km^{2} (97.0/sq mi)
- Time zone: UTC+01:00 (CET)
  - Summer (DST): UTC+02:00 (CEST)
- INSEE/Postal code: 26194 /26350
- ^{1} French Land Register data, which excludes lakes, ponds, glaciers > 1 km^{2} (0.386 sq mi or 247 acres) and river estuaries.

Montchenu (French pronunciation: [mɔ̃ʃəny]) is a commune in the Drôme department in southeastern France.

== Population ==
Historical population
Year	Pop.	±% p.a.
1968	455	—
1975	386	−2.32%
1982	381	−0.19%
1990	389	+0.26%
1999	456	+1.78%
2007	556	+2.51%
2012	582	+0.92%
2017	579	−0.10%
2023	605	+0.73%
Source: INSEE

== See also ==
- Communes of the Drôme department
