= Moras-en-Valloire =

- Commune
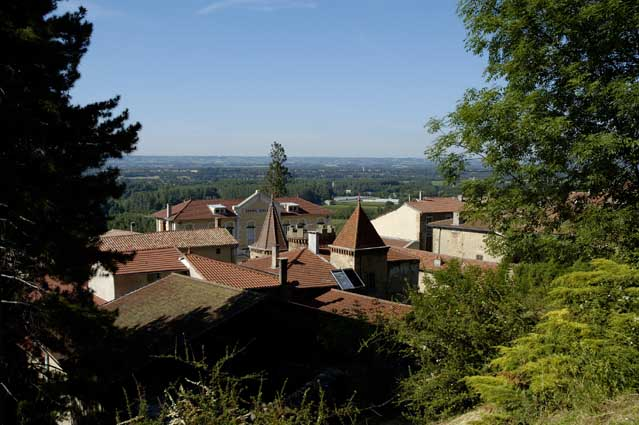
- A general view of Moras-en-Valloire
- Location of Moras-en-Valloire
- Location within France Location within Auvergne-Rhône-Alpes
- Coordinates: 45°17′28″N 4°59′39″E
- Country: France
- Region: Auvergne-Rhône-Alpes
- Department: Drôme
- Arrondissement: Valence
- Canton: Drôme des collines

Government
  - Mayor (2020–2026): Aurélien Ferlay
- Area^{1}: 8.58 km^{2} (3.31 sq mi)
- Elevation: 252 m (827 ft)
- Highest elevation: 420 m (1,380 ft)
- Lowest elevation: 217 m (712 ft)
- Population (2023): 682
  - Density: 79.5/km^{2} (206/sq mi)
- Time zone: UTC+01:00 (CET)
  - Summer (DST): UTC+02:00 (CEST)
- INSEE/Postal code: 26213 /26210
- ^{1} French Land Register data, which excludes lakes, ponds, glaciers > 1 km^{2} (0.386 sq mi or 247 acres) and river estuaries.

Moras-en-Valloire (French pronunciation: [mɔʁas ɑ̃ valwaʁ]) is a commune in the Drôme department in southeastern France.

== Population ==
Historical population
Year	Pop.	±% p.a.
1968	475	—
1975	387	−2.88%
1982	468	+2.75%
1990	582	+2.76%
1999	602	+0.38%
2007	604	+0.04%
2012	628	+0.78%
2017	667	+1.21%
2023	682	+0.37%
Source: INSEE

== See also ==
- Communes of the Drôme department
