= Parnans =

- Commune
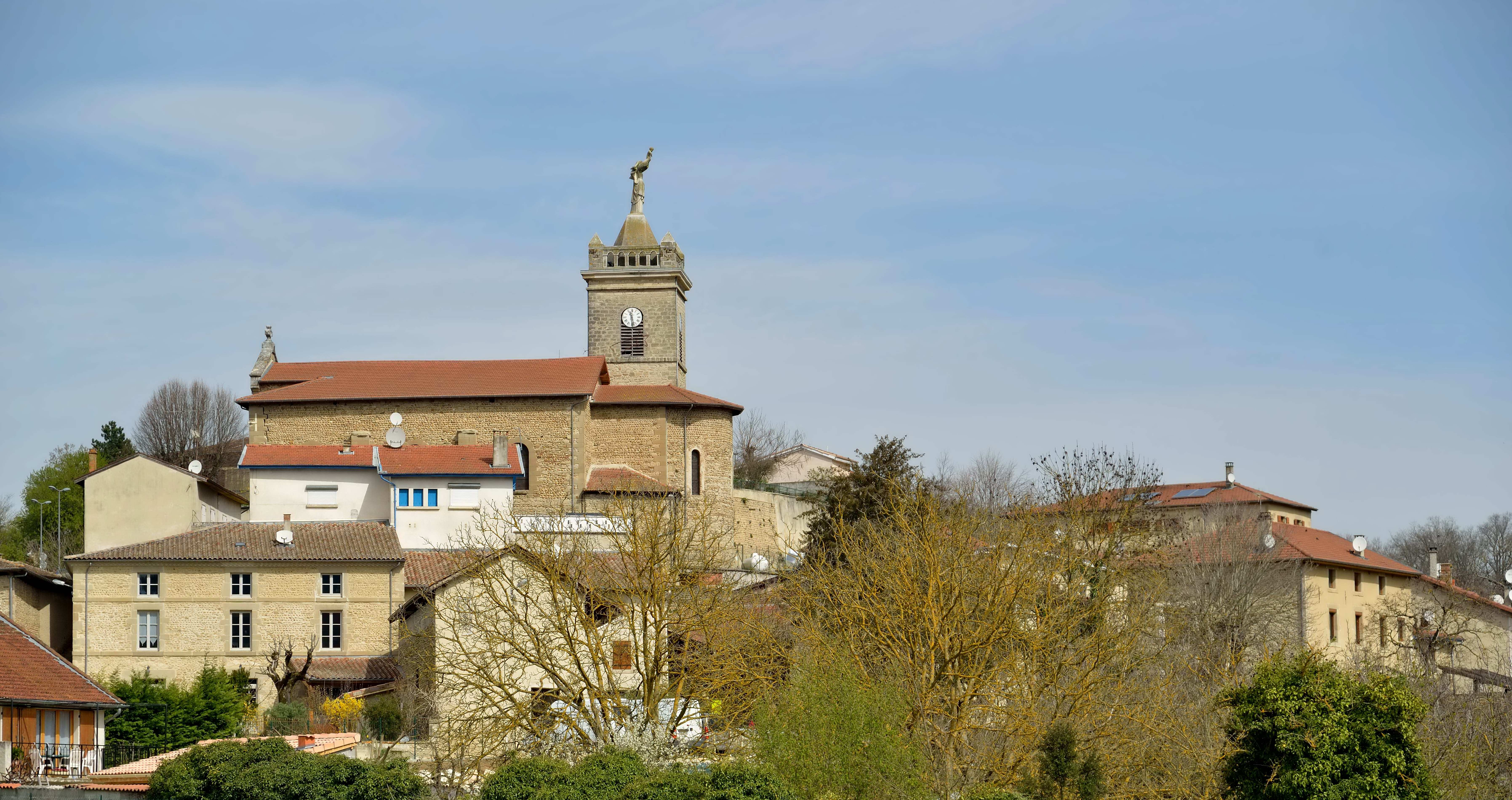
- The village of Parnans
- Location of Parnans
- Location within France Location within Auvergne-Rhône-Alpes
- Coordinates: 45°06′40″N 5°08′50″E
- Country: France
- Region: Auvergne-Rhône-Alpes
- Department: Drôme
- Arrondissement: Valence
- Canton: Drôme des collines
- Intercommunality: CA Valence Romans Agglo

Government
  - Mayor (2020–2026): Alain Robin
- Area^{1}: 11.24 km^{2} (4.34 sq mi)
- Elevation: 245 m (804 ft)
- Highest elevation: 406 m (1,332 ft)
- Lowest elevation: 211 m (692 ft)
- Population (2023): 701
  - Density: 62.4/km^{2} (162/sq mi)
- Time zone: UTC+01:00 (CET)
  - Summer (DST): UTC+02:00 (CEST)
- INSEE/Postal code: 26225 /26750
- ^{1} French Land Register data, which excludes lakes, ponds, glaciers > 1 km^{2} (0.386 sq mi or 247 acres) and river estuaries.

Parnans is a commune in the Drôme department in southeastern France.

== Population ==
Historical population
Year	Pop.	±% p.a.
1968	406	—
1975	357	−1.82%
1982	435	+2.86%
1990	458	+0.65%
1999	476	+0.43%
2007	620	+3.36%
2012	687	+2.07%
2017	697	+0.29%
2023	701	+0.10%
Source: INSEE

== See also ==
- Communes of the Drôme department
