= Saint-Christophe-et-le-Laris =

- Commune
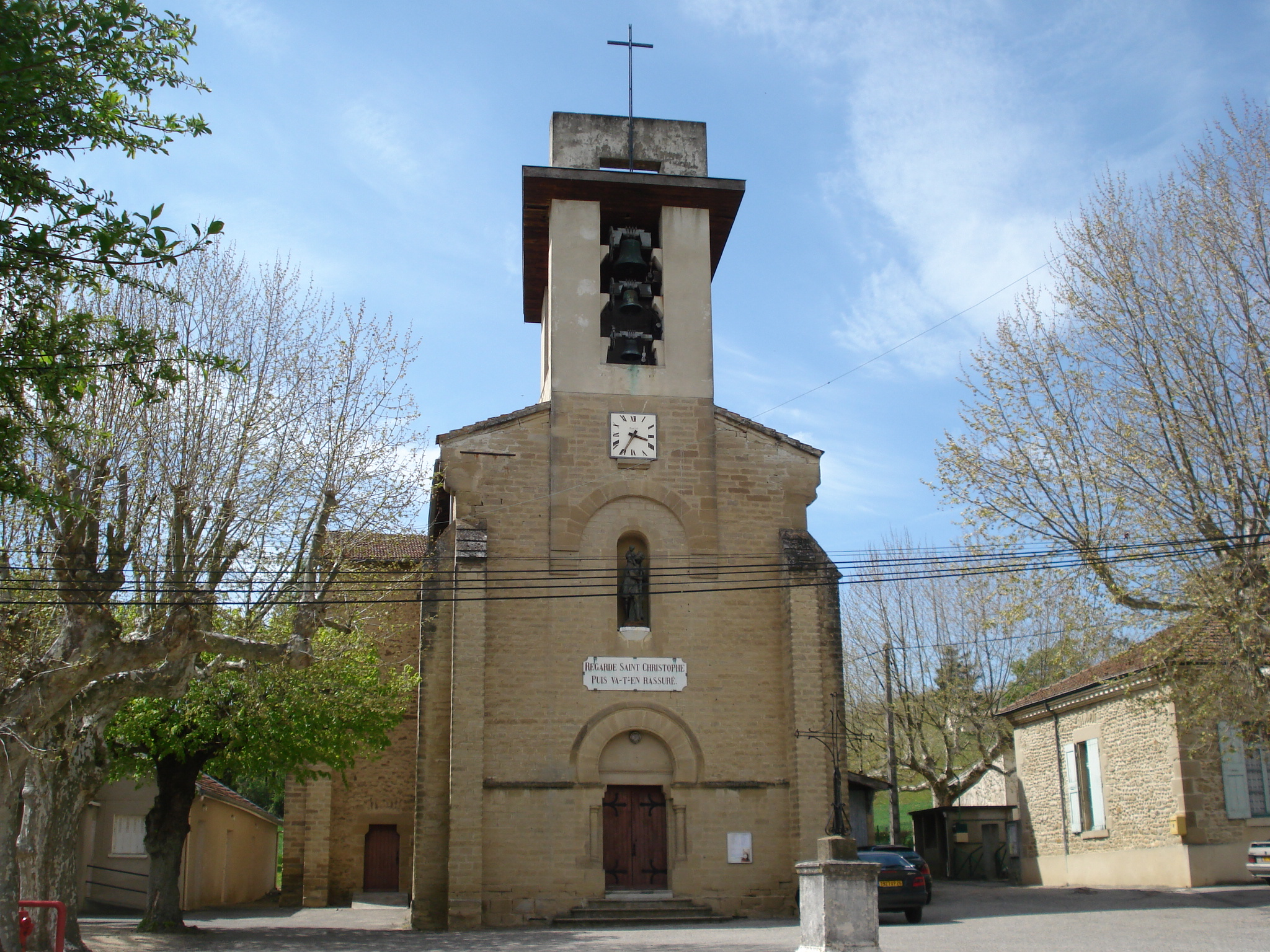
- The church of Saint-Christophe-et-le-Laris
- Location of Saint-Christophe-et-le-Laris
- Location within France Location within Auvergne-Rhône-Alpes
- Coordinates: 45°12′39″N 5°04′20″E
- Country: France
- Region: Auvergne-Rhône-Alpes
- Department: Drôme
- Arrondissement: Valence
- Canton: Drôme des collines
- Intercommunality: CA Valence Romans Agglo

Government
  - Mayor (2020–2026): Francis Barry
- Area^{1}: 11.35 km^{2} (4.38 sq mi)
- Elevation: 350 m (1,150 ft)
- Highest elevation: 502 m (1,647 ft)
- Lowest elevation: 320 m (1,050 ft)
- Population (2023): 424
  - Density: 37.4/km^{2} (96.8/sq mi)
- Time zone: UTC+01:00 (CET)
  - Summer (DST): UTC+02:00 (CEST)
- INSEE/Postal code: 26298 /26350
- ^{1} French Land Register data, which excludes lakes, ponds, glaciers > 1 km^{2} (0.386 sq mi or 247 acres) and river estuaries.

Saint-Christophe-et-le-Laris (Arpitan: Sent-Cristofllo-et-lo-Larrés) is a commune in the Drôme department in southeastern France.

== Population ==
Historical population
Year	Pop.	±% p.a.
1968	377	—
1975	323	−2.18%
1982	297	−1.19%
1990	318	+0.86%
1999	289	−1.06%
2007	395	+3.98%
2012	390	−0.25%
2017	416	+1.30%
2023	424	+0.32%
Source: INSEE

== See also ==
- Communes of the Drôme department
