= Lens-Lestang =

- Commune
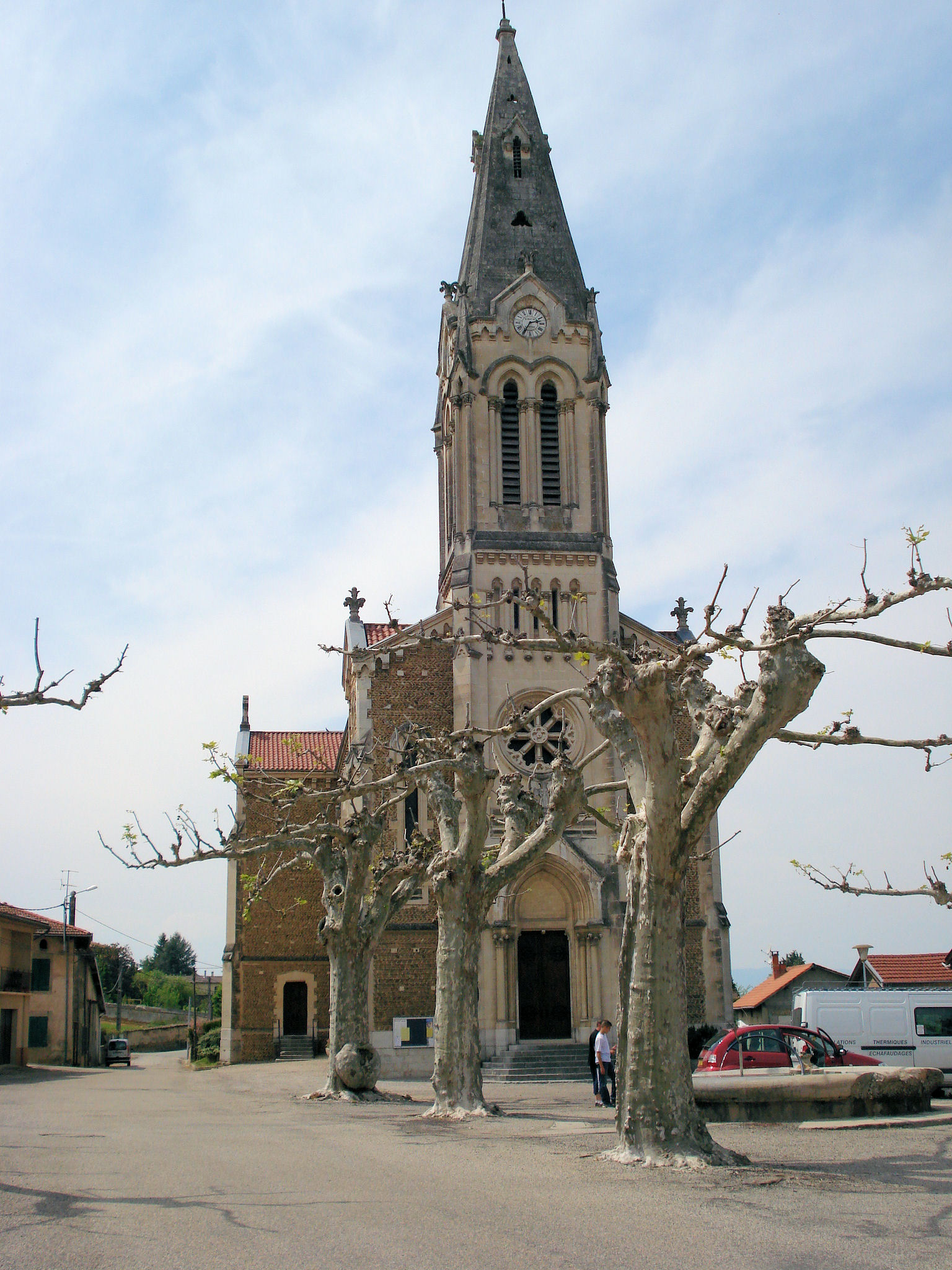
- The church of Saint Jean-Baptiste, in Lens-Lestang

- Coat of arms
- Location of Lens-Lestang
- Location within France Location within Auvergne-Rhône-Alpes
- Coordinates: 45°17′33″N 5°02′36″E
- Country: France
- Region: Auvergne-Rhône-Alpes
- Department: Drôme
- Arrondissement: Valence
- Canton: Drôme des collines

Government
  - Mayor (2020–2026): François Faure
- Area^{1}: 16.41 km^{2} (6.34 sq mi)
- Elevation: 300 m (980 ft)
- Highest elevation: 448 m (1,470 ft)
- Lowest elevation: 237 m (778 ft)
- Population (2023): 884
  - Density: 53.9/km^{2} (140/sq mi)
- Time zone: UTC+01:00 (CET)
  - Summer (DST): UTC+02:00 (CEST)
- INSEE/Postal code: 26162 /26210
- ^{1} French Land Register data, which excludes lakes, ponds, glaciers > 1 km^{2} (0.386 sq mi or 247 acres) and river estuaries.

Lens-Lestang (French pronunciation: [lɑ̃s lɛstɑ̃]) is a commune in the Drôme department in southeastern France.

== Population ==
Historical population
Year	Pop.	±% p.a.
1968	655	—
1975	636	−0.42%
1982	672	+0.79%
1990	629	−0.82%
1999	667	+0.65%
2007	790	+2.14%
2012	829	+0.97%
2017	882	+1.25%
2023	884	+0.04%
Source: INSEE

== See also ==
- Communes of the Drôme department
