= Manthes =

- Commune
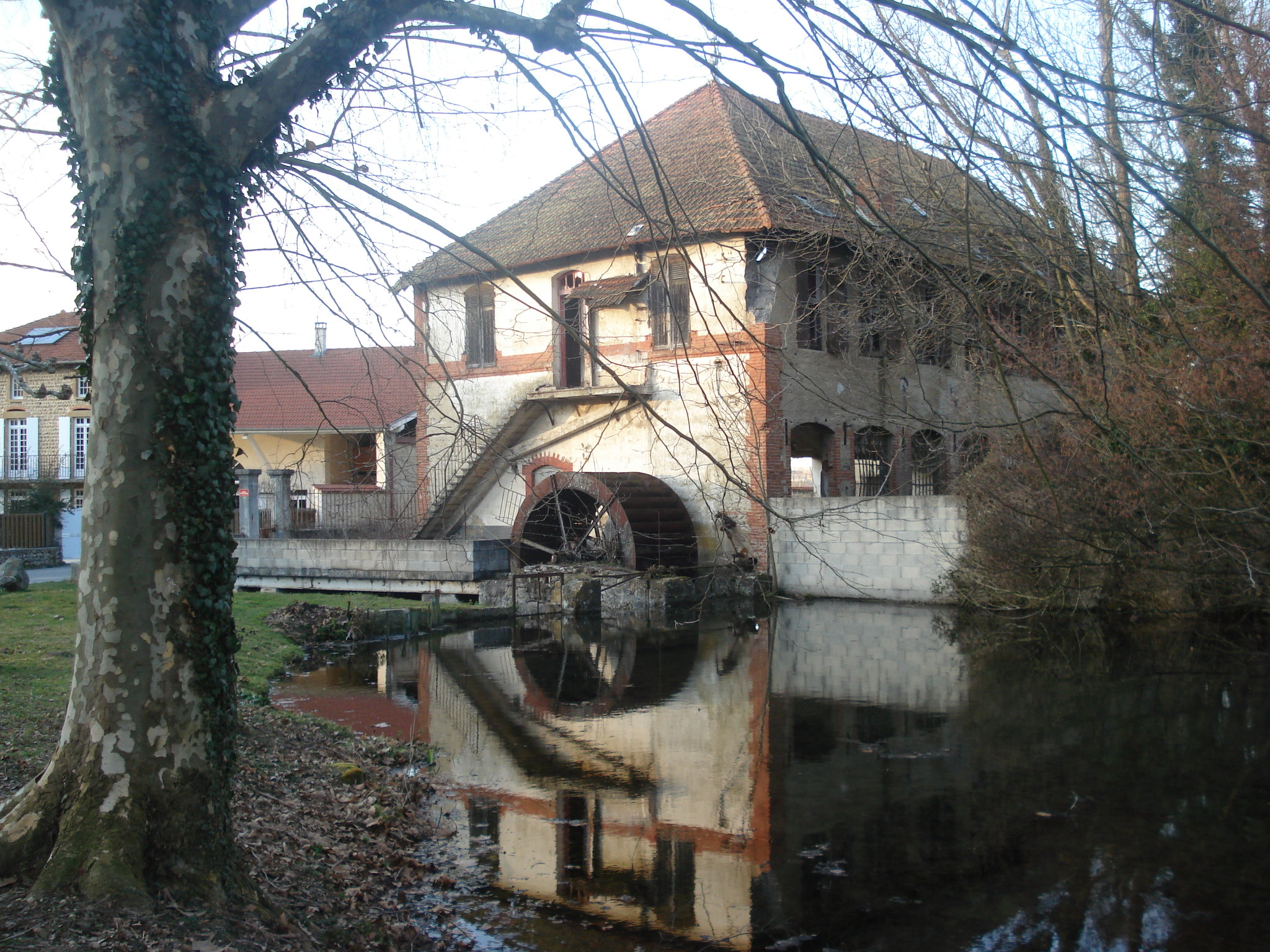
- Mill
- Location of Manthes
- Location within France Location within Auvergne-Rhône-Alpes
- Coordinates: 45°18′13″N 5°00′29″E
- Country: France
- Region: Auvergne-Rhône-Alpes
- Department: Drôme
- Arrondissement: Valence
- Canton: Drôme des collines

Government
  - Mayor (2020–2026): Nathalie Durand
- Area^{1}: 6.83 km^{2} (2.64 sq mi)
- Elevation: 205 m (673 ft)
- Highest elevation: 320 m (1,050 ft)
- Lowest elevation: 222 m (728 ft)
- Population (2023): 685
  - Density: 100/km^{2} (260/sq mi)
- Time zone: UTC+01:00 (CET)
  - Summer (DST): UTC+02:00 (CEST)
- INSEE/Postal code: 26172 /26210
- ^{1} French Land Register data, which excludes lakes, ponds, glaciers > 1 km^{2} (0.386 sq mi or 247 acres) and river estuaries.

Manthes (French pronunciation: [mɑ̃t]) is a commune in the Drôme department in southeastern France.

== Population ==
Historical population
Year	Pop.	±% p.a.
1968	572	—
1975	488	−2.24%
1982	502	+0.40%
1990	564	+1.47%
1999	570	+0.12%
2007	623	+1.12%
2012	666	+1.34%
2017	670	+0.12%
2023	685	+0.37%
Source: INSEE

== See also ==
- Communes of the Drôme department
