= Saint-Sorlin-en-Valloire =

- Commune
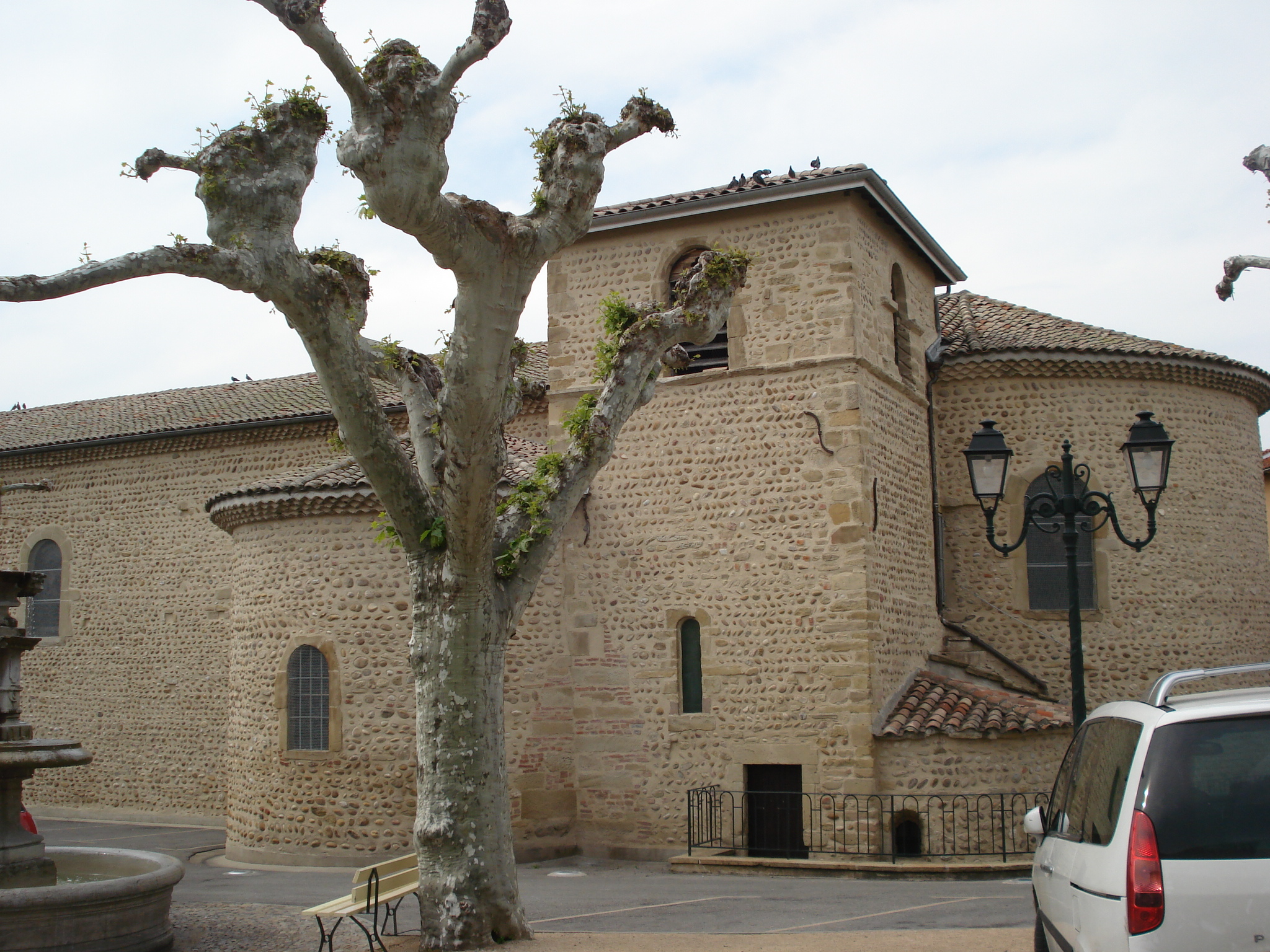
- The church of Saint Saturnin, in Saint-Sorlin-en-Valloire

- Coat of arms
- Location of Saint-Sorlin-en-Valloire
- Location within France Location within Auvergne-Rhône-Alpes
- Coordinates: 45°17′N 4°57′E
- Country: France
- Region: Auvergne-Rhône-Alpes
- Department: Drôme
- Arrondissement: Valence
- Canton: Drôme des collines

Government
  - Mayor (2020–2026): Guillaume Luyton
- Area^{1}: 26.50 km^{2} (10.23 sq mi)
- Elevation: 150 m (490 ft)
- Highest elevation: 413 m (1,355 ft)
- Lowest elevation: 199 m (653 ft)
- Population (2023): 2,251
  - Density: 84.94/km^{2} (220.0/sq mi)
- Time zone: UTC+01:00 (CET)
  - Summer (DST): UTC+02:00 (CEST)
- INSEE/Postal code: 26330 /26210
- ^{1} French Land Register data, which excludes lakes, ponds, glaciers > 1 km^{2} (0.386 sq mi or 247 acres) and river estuaries.

Saint-Sorlin-en-Valloire (French pronunciation: [sɛ̃ sɔʁlɛ̃ ɑ̃ valwaʁ]) is a commune in the Drôme department in southeastern France.

== Population ==
Historical population
Year	Pop.	±% p.a.
1968	1,349	—
1975	1,376	+0.28%
1982	1,403	+0.28%
1990	1,452	+0.43%
1999	1,559	+0.79%
2007	1,878	+2.35%
2012	2,197	+3.19%
2017	2,268	+0.64%
2023	2,251	−0.13%
Source: INSEE

== See also ==
- Communes of the Drôme department
