= Lapeyrouse-Mornay =

- Commune
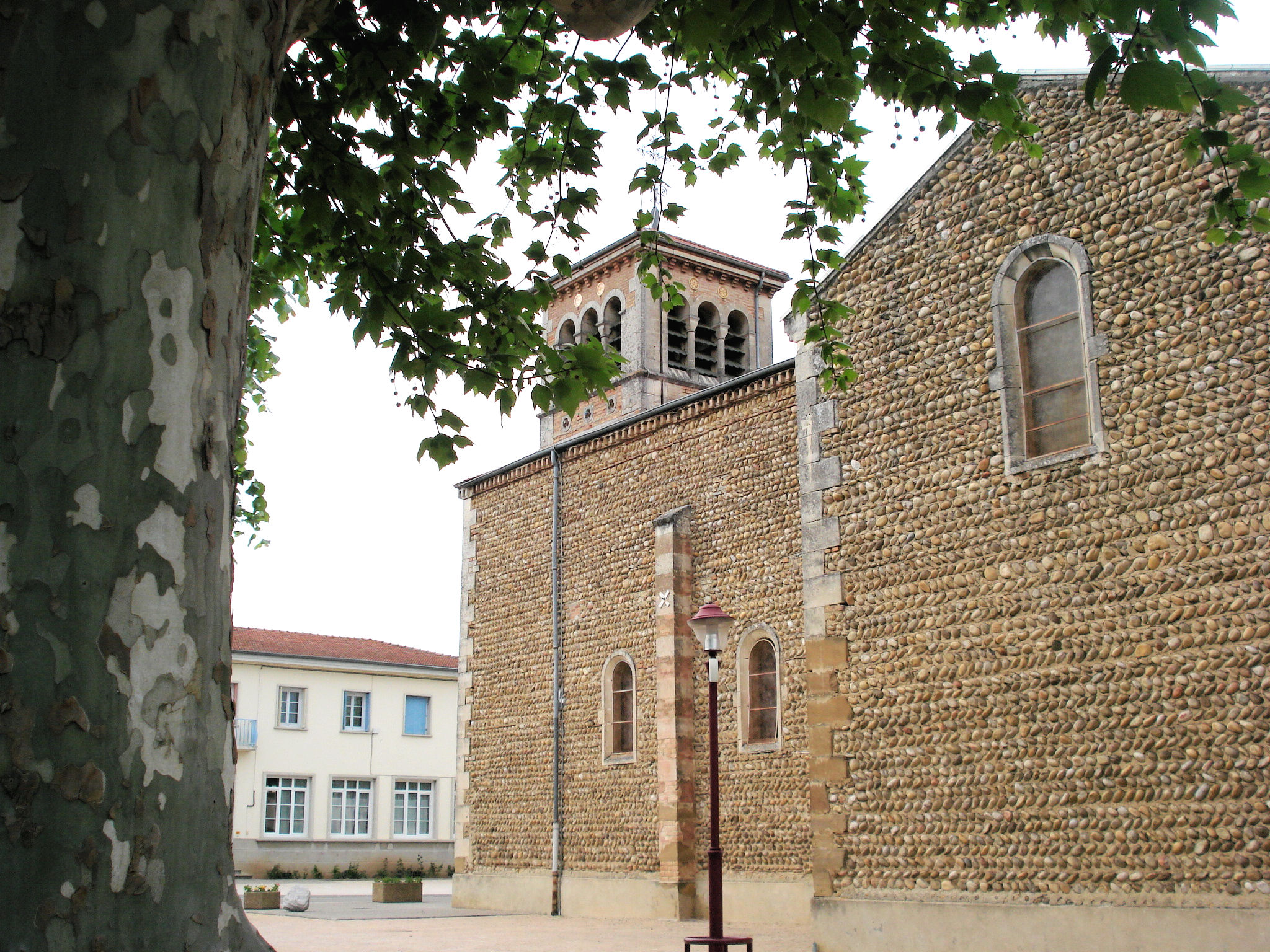
- The church of Lapeyrouse-Mornay
- Location of Lapeyrouse-Mornay
- Location within France Location within Auvergne-Rhône-Alpes
- Coordinates: 45°19′26″N 4°59′45″E
- Country: France
- Region: Auvergne-Rhône-Alpes
- Department: Drôme
- Arrondissement: Valence
- Canton: Drôme des collines

Government
  - Mayor (2020–2026): Nicole Durand
- Area^{1}: 11.45 km^{2} (4.42 sq mi)
- Elevation: 278 m (912 ft)
- Highest elevation: 272 m (892 ft)
- Lowest elevation: 220 m (720 ft)
- Population (2023): 1,178
  - Density: 102.9/km^{2} (266.5/sq mi)
- Time zone: UTC+01:00 (CET)
  - Summer (DST): UTC+02:00 (CEST)
- INSEE/Postal code: 26155 /26210
- ^{1} French Land Register data, which excludes lakes, ponds, glaciers > 1 km^{2} (0.386 sq mi or 247 acres) and river estuaries.

Lapeyrouse-Mornay (French pronunciation: [lapeʁuz mɔʁnɛ]; Arpitan: La Piérrosa-Mornê) is a commune in the Drôme department in southeastern France.

== Population ==
Historical population
Year	Pop.	±% p.a.
1968	597	—
1975	599	+0.05%
1982	615	+0.38%
1990	723	+2.04%
1999	805	+1.20%
2007	1,048	+3.35%
2012	1,194	+2.64%
2017	1,219	+0.42%
2023	1,178	−0.57%
Source: INSEE

== See also ==
- Communes of the Drôme department
