= Tersanne =

- Commune
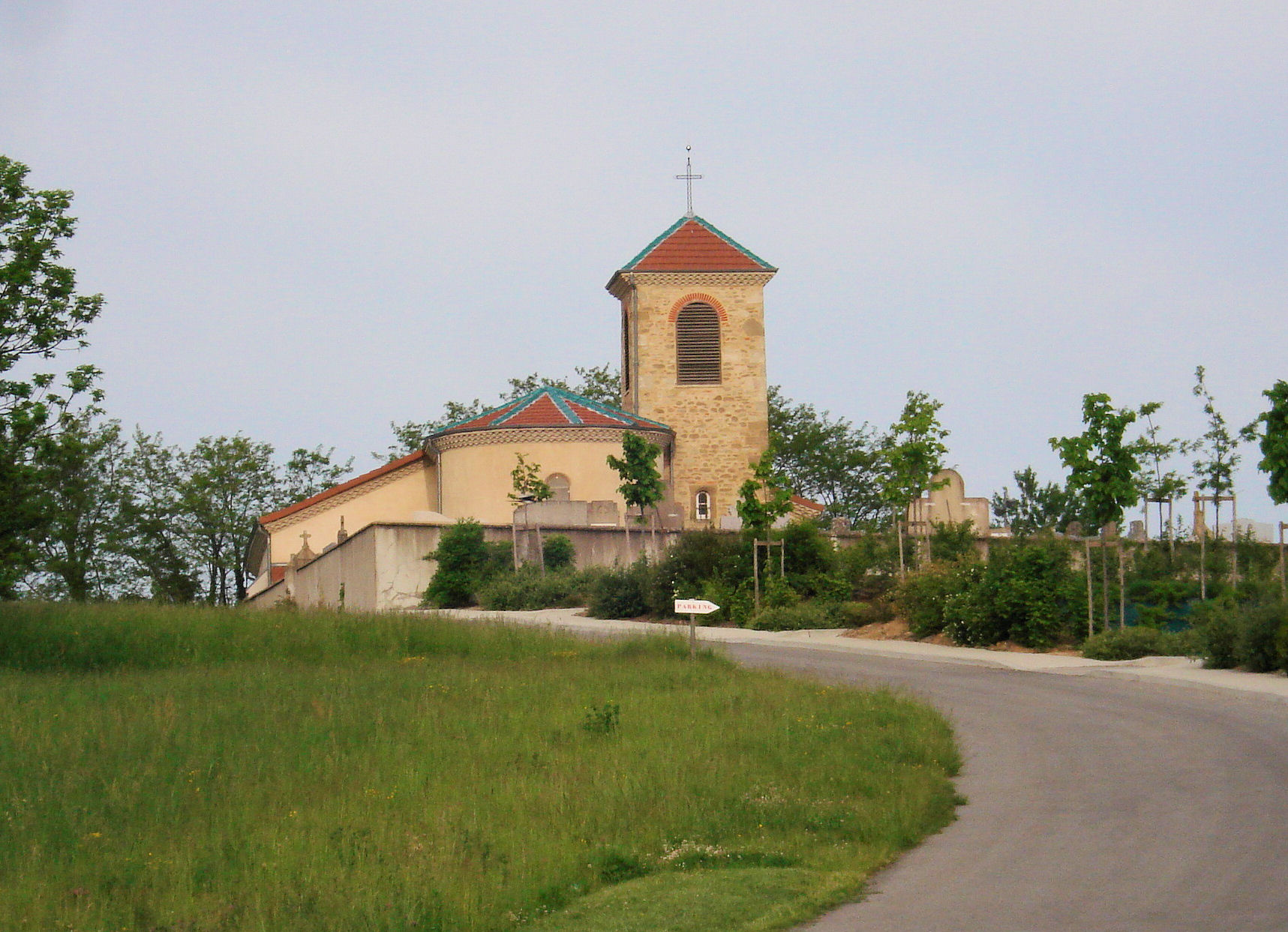
- The church of Saint-Romain, in Tersanne
- Location of Tersanne
- Location within France Location within Auvergne-Rhône-Alpes
- Coordinates: 45°13′34″N 5°01′05″E
- Country: France
- Region: Auvergne-Rhône-Alpes
- Department: Drôme
- Arrondissement: Valence
- Canton: Drôme des collines

Government
  - Mayor (2020–2026): Daniel Arnaud
- Area^{1}: 9.49 km^{2} (3.66 sq mi)
- Elevation: 400 m (1,300 ft)
- Highest elevation: 494 m (1,621 ft)
- Lowest elevation: 271 m (889 ft)
- Population (2023): 353
  - Density: 37.2/km^{2} (96.3/sq mi)
- Time zone: UTC+01:00 (CET)
  - Summer (DST): UTC+02:00 (CEST)
- INSEE/Postal code: 26349 /26390
- ^{1} French Land Register data, which excludes lakes, ponds, glaciers > 1 km^{2} (0.386 sq mi or 247 acres) and river estuaries.

Tersanne (French pronunciation: [tɛʁsan]) is a commune in the Drôme department in southeastern France.

== Population ==
Historical population
Year	Pop.	±% p.a.
1968	213	—
1975	188	−1.77%
1982	175	−1.02%
1990	156	−1.43%
1999	189	+2.16%
2007	265	+4.32%
2012	362	+6.44%
2017	357	−0.28%
2023	353	−0.19%
Source: INSEE

== See also ==
- Communes of the Drôme department
