= Arthémonay =

- Commune
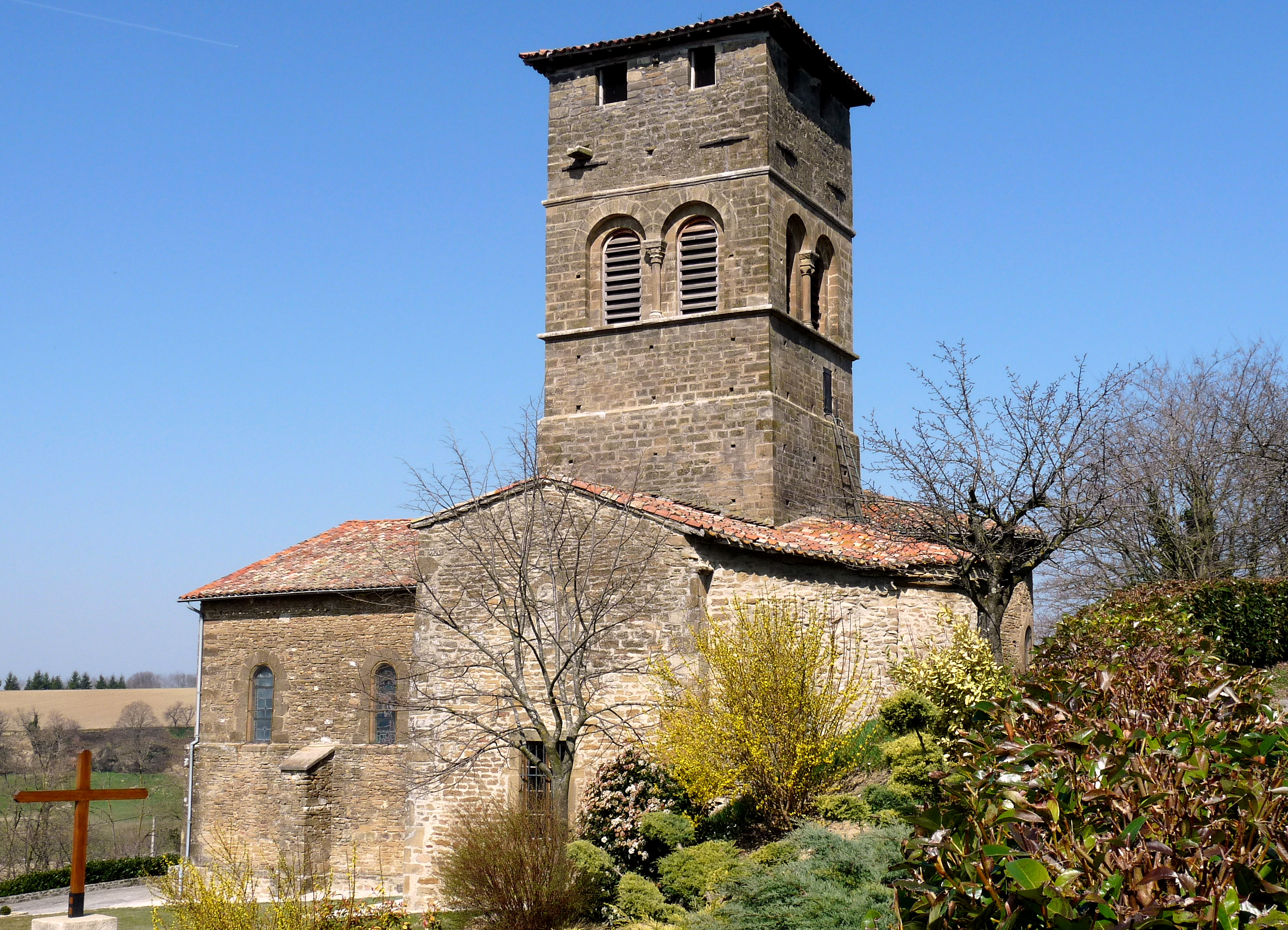
- The church of Arthémonay
- Location of Arthémonay
- Location within France Location within Auvergne-Rhône-Alpes
- Coordinates: 45°08′39″N 5°03′20″E
- Country: France
- Region: Auvergne-Rhône-Alpes
- Department: Drôme
- Arrondissement: Valence
- Canton: Drôme des collines
- Intercommunality: CA Arche Agglo

Government
  - Mayor (2020–2026): Jean-Louis Bonnet
- Area^{1}: 5.70 km^{2} (2.20 sq mi)
- Elevation: 280 m (920 ft)
- Highest elevation: 437 m (1,434 ft)
- Lowest elevation: 274 m (899 ft)
- Population (2023): 613
  - Density: 108/km^{2} (279/sq mi)
- Time zone: UTC+01:00 (CET)
  - Summer (DST): UTC+02:00 (CEST)
- INSEE/Postal code: 26014 /26260
- ^{1} French Land Register data, which excludes lakes, ponds, glaciers > 1 km^{2} (0.386 sq mi or 247 acres) and river estuaries.

Arthémonay (French pronunciation: [aʁtemɔnɛ]; Occitan: Artemonai) is a commune in the Drôme department in southeastern France.

== Population ==
Historical population
Year	Pop.	±% p.a.
1968	237	—
1975	242	+0.30%
1982	294	+2.82%
1990	334	+1.61%
1999	370	+1.14%
2007	513	+4.17%
2012	549	+1.37%
2017	588	+1.38%
2023	613	+0.70%
Source: INSEE

== See also ==
- Communes of the Drôme department
