= Saint-Donat-sur-l'Herbasse =

- Commune
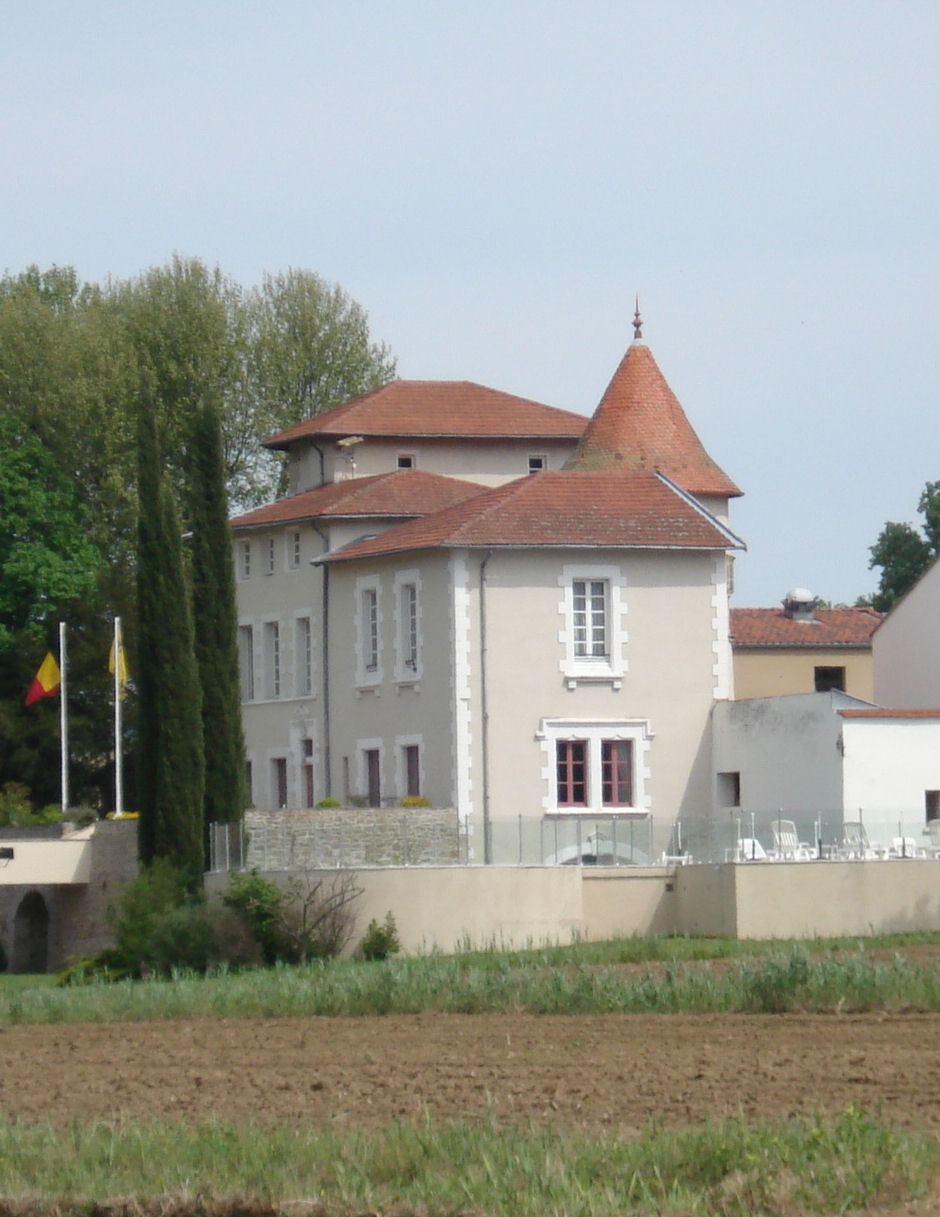
- Chateau of Collonges

- Coat of arms
- Location of Saint-Donat-sur-l'Herbasse
- Location within France Location within Auvergne-Rhône-Alpes
- Coordinates: 45°07′26″N 4°59′00″E
- Country: France
- Region: Auvergne-Rhône-Alpes
- Department: Drôme
- Arrondissement: Valence
- Canton: Drôme des collines
- Intercommunality: CA Arche Agglo

Government
  - Mayor (2020–2026): Claude Fourel
- Area^{1}: 19.52 km^{2} (7.54 sq mi)
- Elevation: 255 m (837 ft)
- Highest elevation: 411 m (1,348 ft)
- Lowest elevation: 176 m (577 ft)
- Population (2023): 4,193
  - Density: 214.8/km^{2} (556.3/sq mi)
- Time zone: UTC+01:00 (CET)
  - Summer (DST): UTC+02:00 (CEST)
- INSEE/Postal code: 26301 /26260
- ^{1} French Land Register data, which excludes lakes, ponds, glaciers > 1 km^{2} (0.386 sq mi or 247 acres) and river estuaries.

Saint-Donat-sur-l'Herbasse (French pronunciation: [sɛ̃ dɔna syʁ lɛʁbas]; Vivaro-Alpine: Sant Donat) is a commune in the Drôme department in southeastern France. The writer and literary prizes winner Isabelle Hausser was born in Saint-Donat.

== Population ==
Historical population
Year	Pop.	±% p.a.
1968	2,217	—
1975	2,141	−0.50%
1982	2,233	+0.60%
1990	2,658	+2.20%
1999	3,132	+1.84%
2007	3,497	+1.39%
2012	3,912	+2.27%
2017	4,195	+1.41%
2023	4,193	−0.01%
Source: INSEE

== Twin towns – sister cities ==
Saint-Donat-sur-l'Herbasse is twinned with:

- Oulx, Italy (1988)
- Ottobeuren, Germany (1994)

== See also ==
- Communes of the Drôme department
