= Claveyson =

- Commune
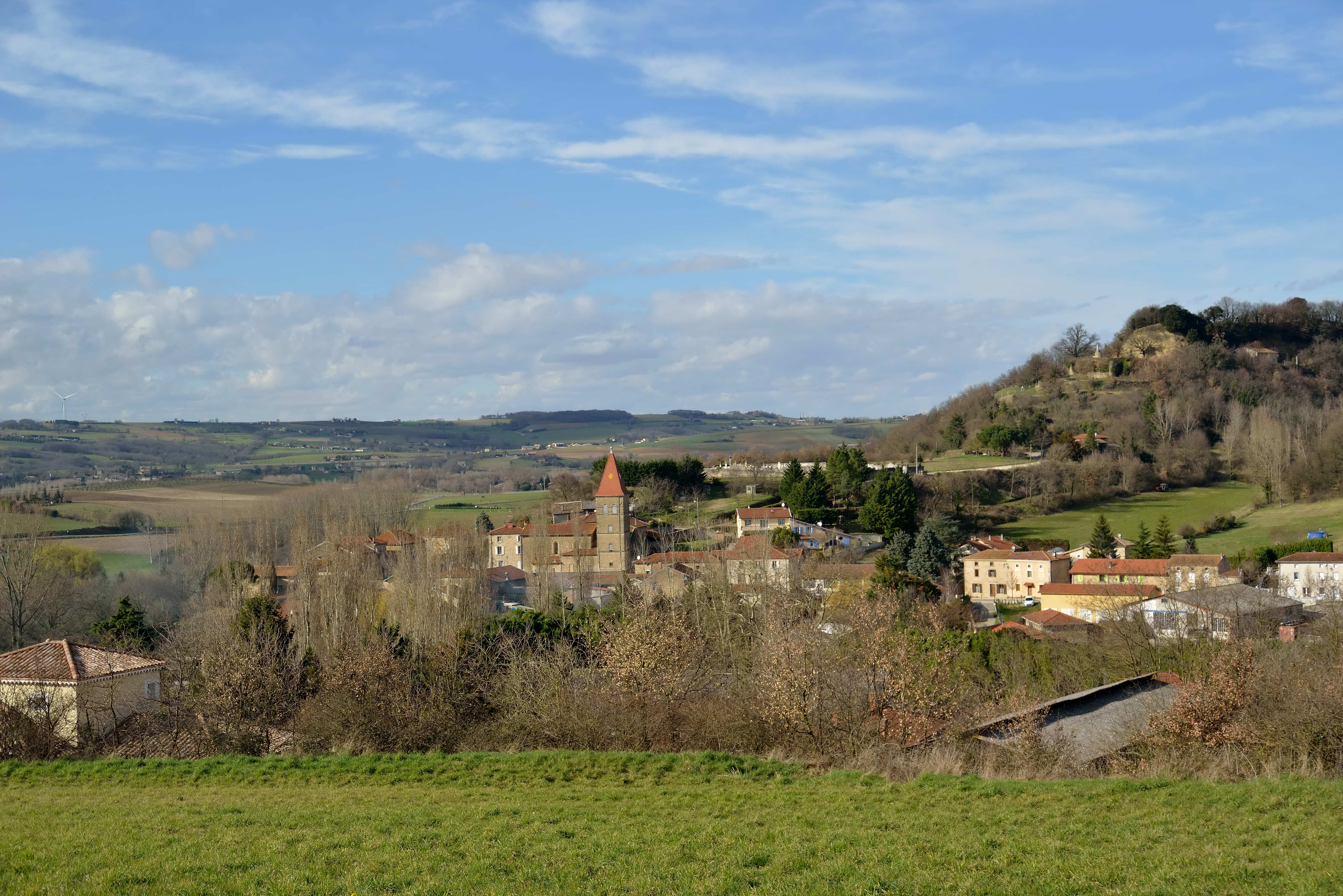
- The village of Claveyson

- Coat of arms
- Location of Claveyson
- Location within France Location within Auvergne-Rhône-Alpes
- Coordinates: 45°10′53″N 4°55′51″E
- Country: France
- Region: Auvergne-Rhône-Alpes
- Department: Drôme
- Arrondissement: Valence
- Canton: Saint-Vallier

Government
  - Mayor (2020–2026): Marin Dernat
- Area^{1}: 16.13 km^{2} (6.23 sq mi)
- Elevation: 104 m (341 ft)
- Highest elevation: 438 m (1,437 ft)
- Lowest elevation: 197 m (646 ft)
- Population (2023): 934
  - Density: 57.9/km^{2} (150/sq mi)
- Time zone: UTC+01:00 (CET)
  - Summer (DST): UTC+02:00 (CEST)
- INSEE/Postal code: 26094 /26240
- ^{1} French Land Register data, which excludes lakes, ponds, glaciers > 1 km^{2} (0.386 sq mi or 247 acres) and river estuaries.

Claveyson (French pronunciation: [klavɛzɔ̃]) is a commune in the Drôme department in southeastern France.

== Population ==
Historical population
Year	Pop.	±% p.a.
1968	596	—
1975	602	+0.14%
1982	641	+0.90%
1990	697	+1.05%
1999	702	+0.08%
2007	837	+2.22%
2012	885	+1.12%
2017	865	−0.46%
2023	934	+1.29%
Source: INSEE

== See also ==
- Communes of the Drôme department
