= Bathernay =

- Commune
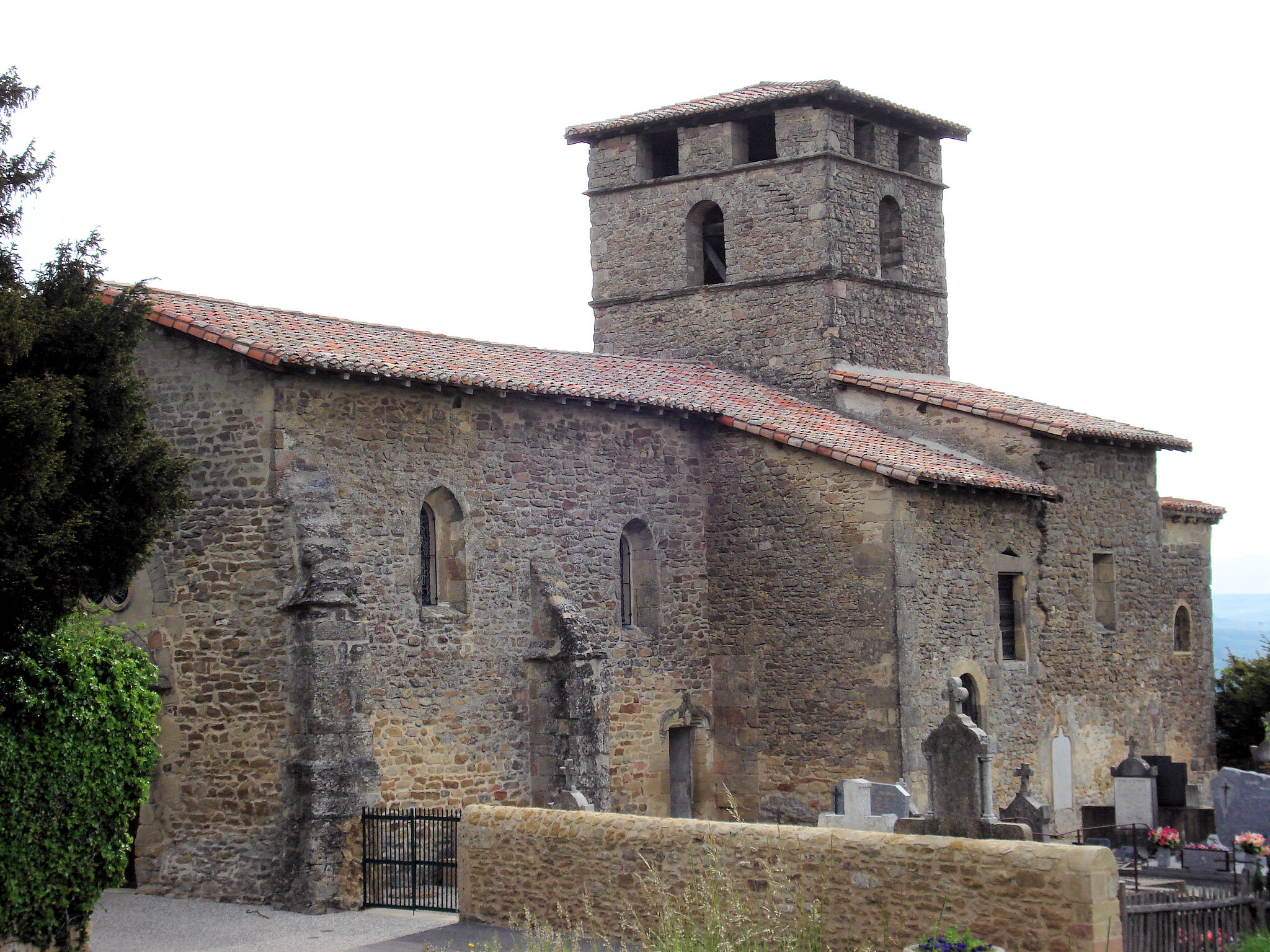
- The church of Saint-Étienne, in Bathernay
- Location of Bathernay
- Location within France Location within Auvergne-Rhône-Alpes
- Coordinates: 45°10′49″N 4°59′42″E
- Country: France
- Region: Auvergne-Rhône-Alpes
- Department: Drôme
- Arrondissement: Valence
- Canton: Drôme des collines
- Intercommunality: CA Arche Agglo

Government
  - Mayor (2020–2026): Denis Deroux
- Area^{1}: 5.71 km^{2} (2.20 sq mi)
- Elevation: 450 m (1,480 ft)
- Highest elevation: 466 m (1,529 ft)
- Lowest elevation: 267 m (876 ft)
- Population (2023): 221
  - Density: 38.7/km^{2} (100/sq mi)
- Time zone: UTC+01:00 (CET)
  - Summer (DST): UTC+02:00 (CEST)
- INSEE/Postal code: 26028 /26260
- ^{1} French Land Register data, which excludes lakes, ponds, glaciers > 1 km^{2} (0.386 sq mi or 247 acres) and river estuaries.

Bathernay (French pronunciation: [batɛʁnɛ]; Arpitan: Bârtenê) is a commune in the Drôme department in southeastern France.

== Population ==
Historical population
Year	Pop.	±% p.a.
1968	165	—
1975	154	−0.98%
1982	154	+0.00%
1990	191	+2.73%
1999	205	+0.79%
2007	231	+1.50%
2012	256	+2.08%
2017	254	−0.16%
2023	221	−2.29%
Source: INSEE

== See also ==
- Communes of the Drôme department
