= Saint-Michel-sur-Savasse =

- Commune
- Location of Saint-Michel-sur-Savasse
- Location within France Location within Auvergne-Rhône-Alpes
- Coordinates: 45°08′46″N 5°07′23″E
- Country: France
- Region: Auvergne-Rhône-Alpes
- Department: Drôme
- Arrondissement: Valence
- Canton: Drôme des collines
- Intercommunality: CA Valence Romans Agglo

Government
  - Mayor (2020–2026): Pierre Colomb
- Area^{1}: 11.11 km^{2} (4.29 sq mi)
- Elevation: 336 m (1,102 ft)
- Highest elevation: 502 m (1,647 ft)
- Lowest elevation: 254 m (833 ft)
- Population (2023): 579
  - Density: 52.1/km^{2} (135/sq mi)
- Time zone: UTC+01:00 (CET)
  - Summer (DST): UTC+02:00 (CEST)
- INSEE/Postal code: 26319 /26750
- ^{1} French Land Register data, which excludes lakes, ponds, glaciers > 1 km^{2} (0.386 sq mi or 247 acres) and river estuaries.

Saint-Michel-sur-Savasse (French pronunciation: [sɛ̃ miʃɛl syʁ savas]; Arpitan: Sent-Mechiél-sus-Savace) is a commune in the Drôme department in southeastern France.

== Population ==
Historical population
Year	Pop.	±% p.a.
1968	319	—
1975	330	+0.49%
1982	325	−0.22%
1990	343	+0.68%
1999	406	+1.89%
2007	504	+2.74%
2012	534	+1.16%
2017	583	+1.77%
2023	579	−0.11%
Source: INSEE

== See also ==
- Communes of the Drôme department
