= Saint-Martin-d'Août =

- Commune
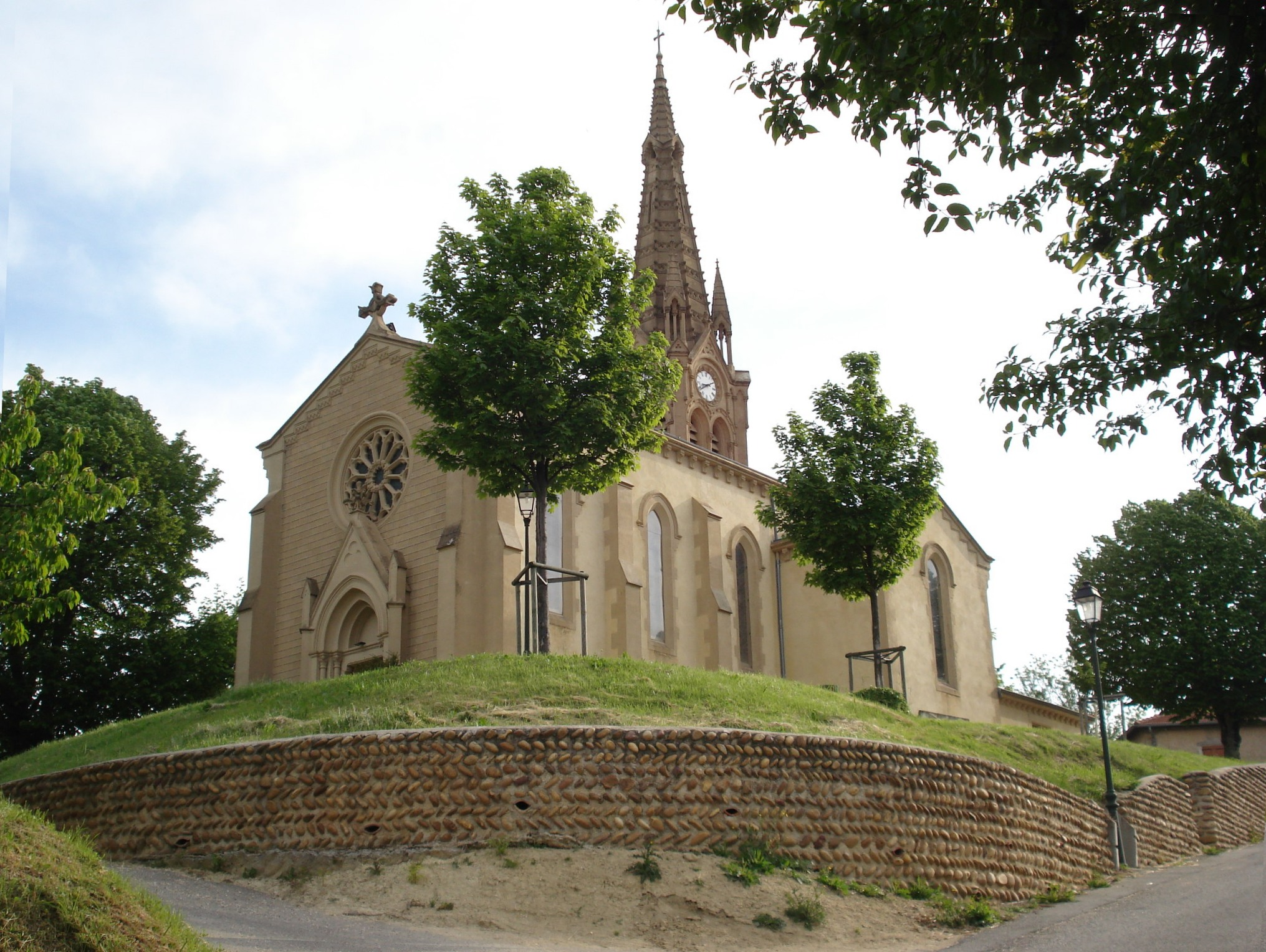
- The church of Saint Martin in Saint-Martin-d'Août
- Location of Saint-Martin-d'Août
- Location within France Location within Auvergne-Rhône-Alpes
- Coordinates: 45°13′05″N 4°59′06″E
- Country: France
- Region: Auvergne-Rhône-Alpes
- Department: Drôme
- Arrondissement: Valence
- Canton: Drôme des collines

Government
  - Mayor (2020–2026): Aline Hebert
- Area^{1}: 7.67 km^{2} (2.96 sq mi)
- Elevation: 373 m (1,224 ft)
- Highest elevation: 423 m (1,388 ft)
- Lowest elevation: 250 m (820 ft)
- Population (2023): 393
  - Density: 51.2/km^{2} (133/sq mi)
- Time zone: UTC+01:00 (CET)
  - Summer (DST): UTC+02:00 (CEST)
- INSEE/Postal code: 26314 /26330
- ^{1} French Land Register data, which excludes lakes, ponds, glaciers > 1 km^{2} (0.386 sq mi or 247 acres) and river estuaries.

Saint-Martin-d'Août (Arpitan: Sent-Martin-dʼÔs) is a commune in the Drôme department in southeastern France.

== Population ==
Historical population
Year	Pop.	±% p.a.
1968	271	—
1975	240	−1.72%
1982	246	+0.35%
1990	258	+0.60%
1999	296	+1.54%
2007	365	+2.65%
2012	398	+1.75%
2017	383	−0.77%
2023	393	+0.43%
Source: INSEE

== See also ==
- Communes of the Drôme department
