= Génissieux =

- Commune
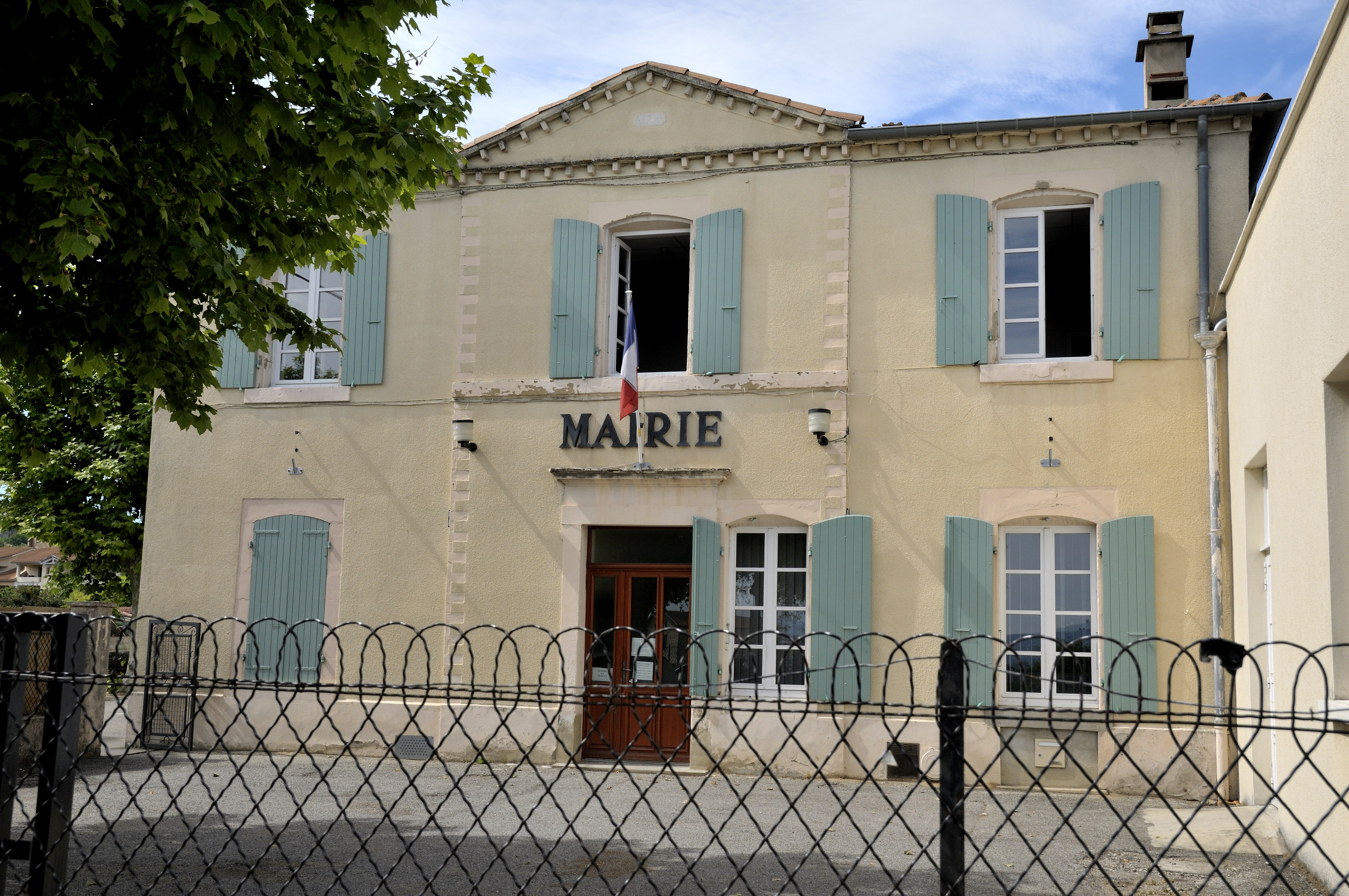
- Town hall
- Location of Génissieux
- Location within France Location within Auvergne-Rhône-Alpes
- Coordinates: 45°05′04″N 5°05′07″E
- Country: France
- Region: Auvergne-Rhône-Alpes
- Department: Drôme
- Arrondissement: Valence
- Canton: Romans-sur-Isère
- Intercommunality: CA Valence Romans Agglo

Government
  - Mayor (2023–2026): Catherine Peltier
- Area^{1}: 8.93 km^{2} (3.45 sq mi)
- Elevation: 164 m (538 ft)
- Highest elevation: 303 m (994 ft)
- Lowest elevation: 177 m (581 ft)
- Population (2023): 2,428
  - Density: 272/km^{2} (704/sq mi)
- Time zone: UTC+01:00 (CET)
  - Summer (DST): UTC+02:00 (CEST)
- INSEE/Postal code: 26139 /26750
- ^{1} French Land Register data, which excludes lakes, ponds, glaciers > 1 km^{2} (0.386 sq mi or 247 acres) and river estuaries.

Génissieux (French pronunciation: [ʒenisjø]; Occitan: Geniciu) is a commune in the Drôme department in southeastern France.

== Population ==
Historical population
Year	Pop.	±% p.a.
1968	655	—
1975	765	+2.24%
1982	1,125	+5.66%
1990	1,584	+4.37%
1999	1,826	+1.59%
2007	2,028	+1.32%
2012	1,971	−0.57%
2017	2,282	+2.97%
2023	2,428	+1.04%
Source: INSEE

== See also ==
- Communes of the Drôme department
