= Montmiral =

- Commune
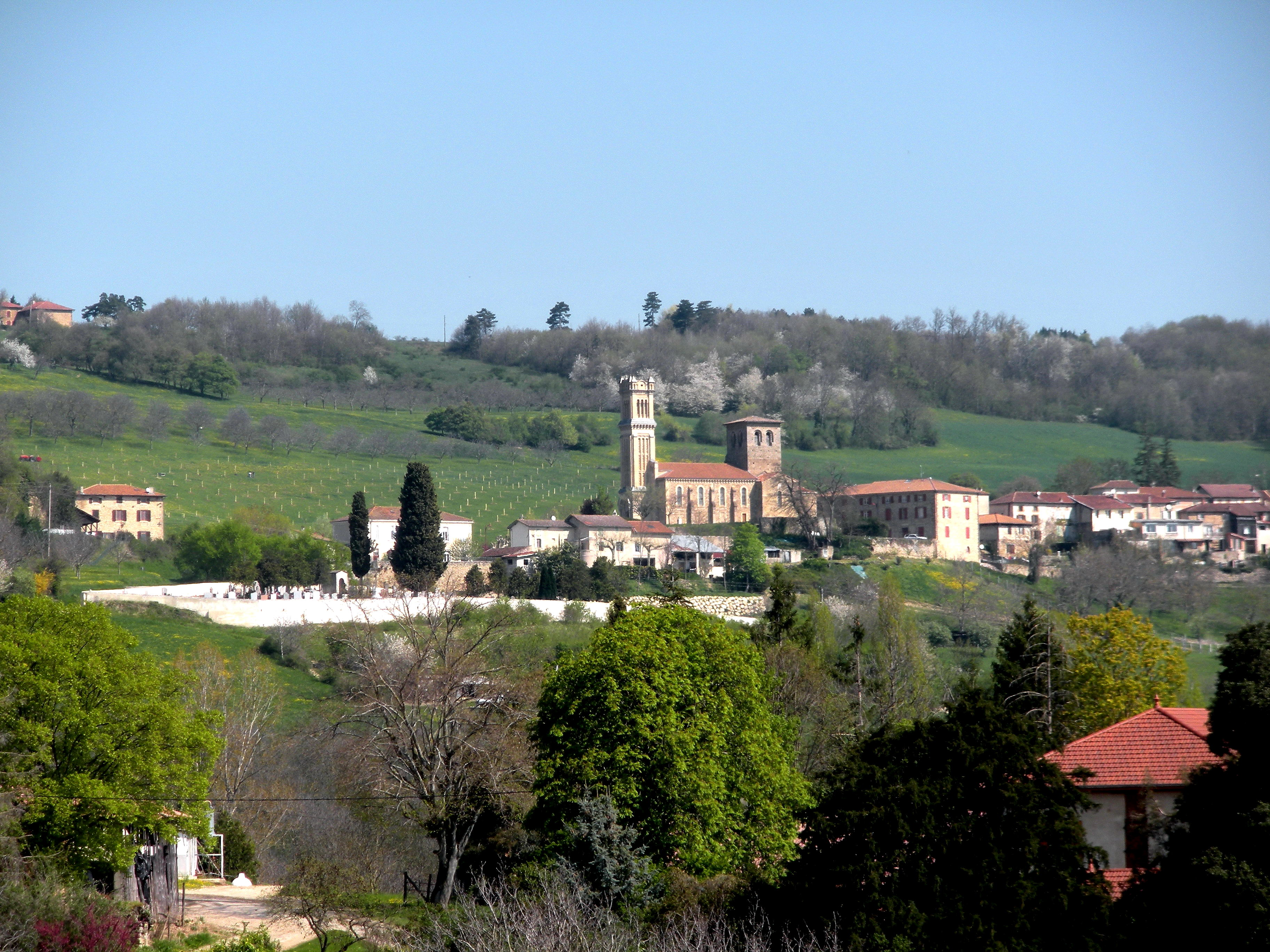
- A general view of Montmiral
- Location of Montmiral
- Location within France Location within Auvergne-Rhône-Alpes
- Coordinates: 45°09′22″N 5°09′02″E
- Country: France
- Region: Auvergne-Rhône-Alpes
- Department: Drôme
- Arrondissement: Valence
- Canton: Drôme des collines
- Intercommunality: CA Valence Romans Agglo

Government
  - Mayor (2020–2026): Jérôme Pouilly
- Area^{1}: 26.69 km^{2} (10.31 sq mi)
- Elevation: 394 m (1,293 ft)
- Highest elevation: 548 m (1,798 ft)
- Lowest elevation: 240 m (790 ft)
- Population (2023): 649
  - Density: 24.3/km^{2} (63.0/sq mi)
- Time zone: UTC+01:00 (CET)
  - Summer (DST): UTC+02:00 (CEST)
- INSEE/Postal code: 26207 /26750
- ^{1} French Land Register data, which excludes lakes, ponds, glaciers > 1 km^{2} (0.386 sq mi or 247 acres) and river estuaries.

Montmiral (French pronunciation: [mɔ̃miʁal]) is a commune in the Drôme department in southeastern France.

== Economy ==
Unemployment in the rural commune is higher than the French national average with 8.1% of people aged between 15 and 64 in Montmiral being unemployed.

== Population ==
Historical population
Year	Pop.	±% p.a.
1968	506	—
1975	458	−1.41%
1982	437	−0.67%
1990	418	−0.55%
1999	441	+0.60%
2007	606	+4.05%
2012	641	+1.13%
2017	671	+0.92%
2023	649	−0.55%
Source: INSEE

== See also ==
- Communes of the Drôme department
