= Châteauneuf-de-Galaure =

- Commune
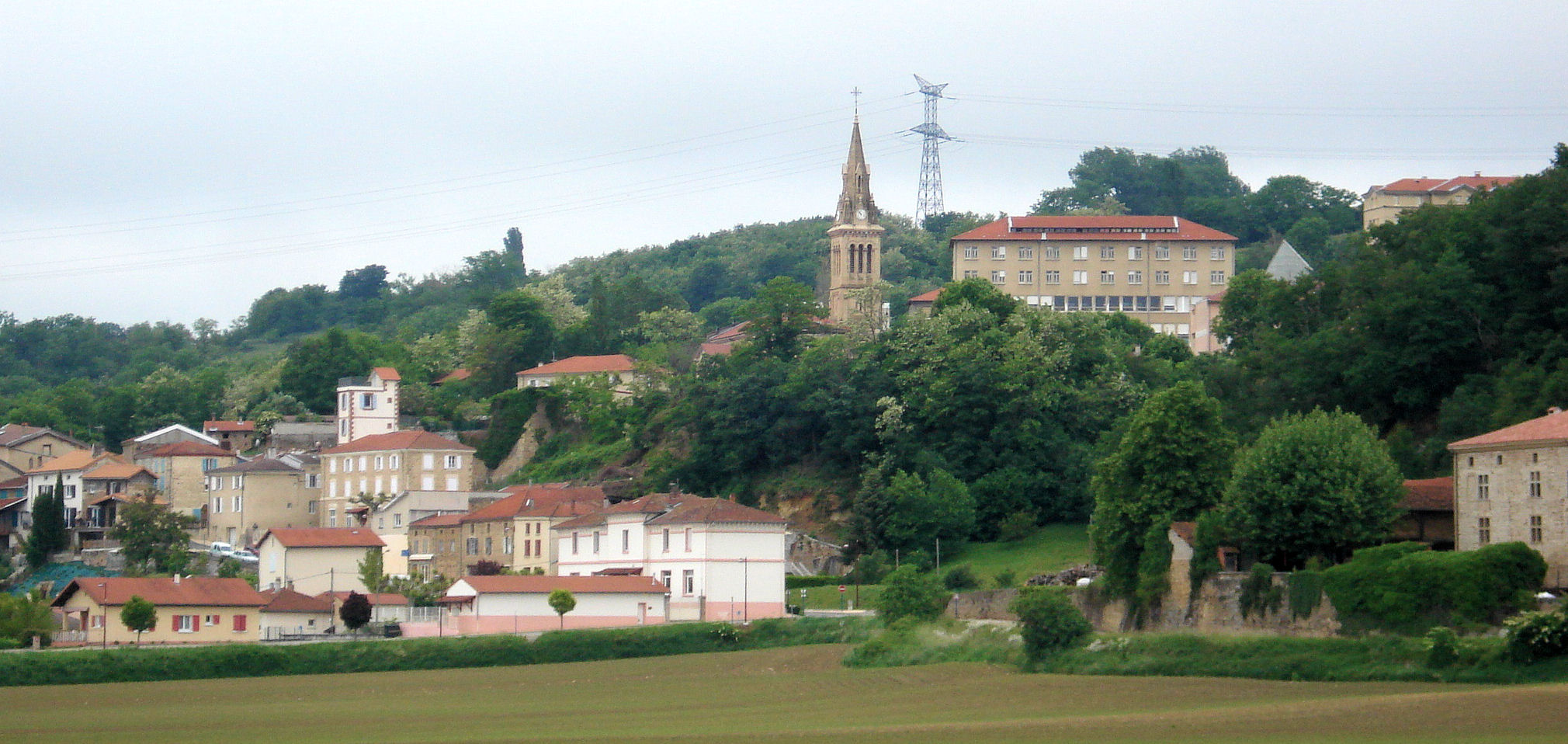
- A general view of Châteauneuf-de-Galaure

- Coat of arms
- Location of Châteauneuf-de-Galaure
- Location within France Location within Auvergne-Rhône-Alpes
- Coordinates: 45°13′58″N 4°57′27″E
- Country: France
- Region: Auvergne-Rhône-Alpes
- Department: Drôme
- Arrondissement: Valence
- Canton: Drôme des collines

Government
  - Mayor (2020–2026): Raphaël Brun
- Area^{1}: 18.08 km^{2} (6.98 sq mi)
- Elevation: 325 m (1,066 ft)
- Highest elevation: 393 m (1,289 ft)
- Lowest elevation: 222 m (728 ft)
- Population (2023): 1,804
  - Density: 99.78/km^{2} (258.4/sq mi)
- Time zone: UTC+01:00 (CET)
  - Summer (DST): UTC+02:00 (CEST)
- INSEE/Postal code: 26083 /26330
- ^{1} French Land Register data, which excludes lakes, ponds, glaciers > 1 km^{2} (0.386 sq mi or 247 acres) and river estuaries.

Châteauneuf-de-Galaure (Arpitan: Châtélnôf-de-Goualôro) is a commune in the Drôme department in southeastern France.

Châteauneuf-de-Galaure has a Franciscan abbey, in the course of being restored, with a cart-track.

== Geography ==
The Galaure flows southwest through the southern part of the commune.

== Population ==
Historical population
| Year | Pop. | ±% p.a. |
|---|---|---|
| 1968 | 1,153 | — |
| 1975 | 1,153 | +0.00% |
| 1982 | 1,252 | +1.18% |
| 1990 | 1,246 | −0.06% |
| 1999 | 1,276 | +0.26% |
| 2007 | 1,497 | +2.02% |
| 2012 | 1,719 | +2.80% |
| 2017 | 1,808 | +1.01% |
| 2023 | 1,804 | −0.04% |
Source: INSEE

== Notable people ==
- Marthe Robin (1902–1981), Roman Catholic mystic, stigmatic and foundress

== See also ==
- Communes of the Drôme department
