= Ratières =

- Commune
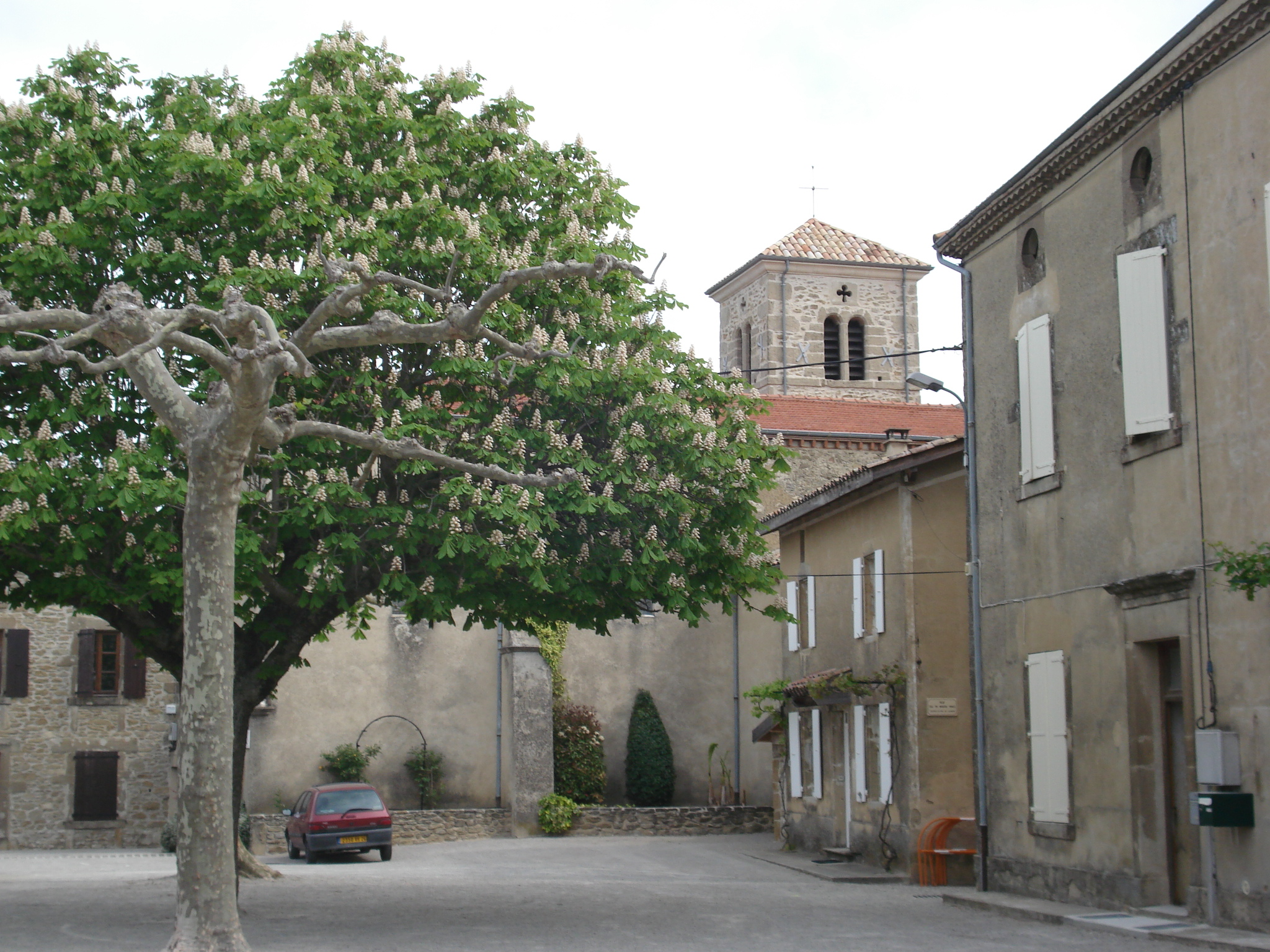
- A view within the village of Ratières
- Location of Ratières
- Location within France Location within Auvergne-Rhône-Alpes
- Coordinates: 45°10′57″N 4°58′08″E
- Country: France
- Region: Auvergne-Rhône-Alpes
- Department: Drôme
- Arrondissement: Valence
- Canton: Drôme des collines
- Intercommunality: Porte de DrômArdèche

Government
  - Mayor (2020–2026): David Bouvier
- Area^{1}: 9.01 km^{2} (3.48 sq mi)
- Highest elevation: 449 m (1,473 ft)
- Lowest elevation: 232 m (761 ft)
- Population (2023): 275
  - Density: 30.5/km^{2} (79.1/sq mi)
- Time zone: UTC+01:00 (CET)
  - Summer (DST): UTC+02:00 (CEST)
- INSEE/Postal code: 26259 /26330
- ^{1} French Land Register data, which excludes lakes, ponds, glaciers > 1 km^{2} (0.386 sq mi or 247 acres) and river estuaries.

Ratières (French pronunciation: [ʁatjɛʁ]; Occitan: Dobby) is a commune in the Drôme department in southeastern France.

== Population ==
Historical population
Year	Pop.	±% p.a.
1968	222	—
1975	191	−2.13%
1982	182	−0.69%
1990	206	+1.56%
1999	255	+2.40%
2007	277	+1.04%
2012	268	−0.66%
2017	270	+0.15%
2023	275	+0.31%
Source: INSEE

== Sights ==
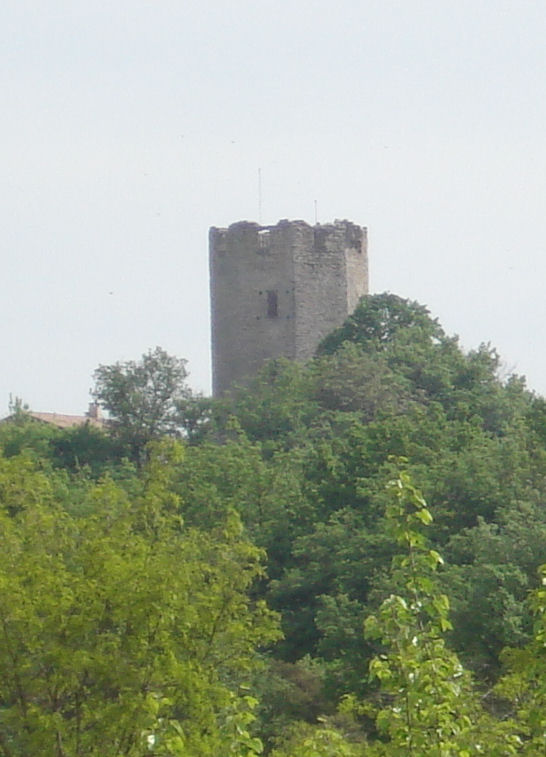
Tour de Ratières

- The Tour de Ratières is the 14th keep of a castle. Extensive modern gardens designed by Paolo Tonini are in the grounds.

== See also ==
- Communes of the Drôme department
