= Salettes =

Salettes may refer to:

- Salettes, Drôme
- Salettes, Haute-Loire
