= Arrondissement of Nyons =

Coordinates: 44°21′28″N 5°07′52″E

Nyons
- Arrondissement
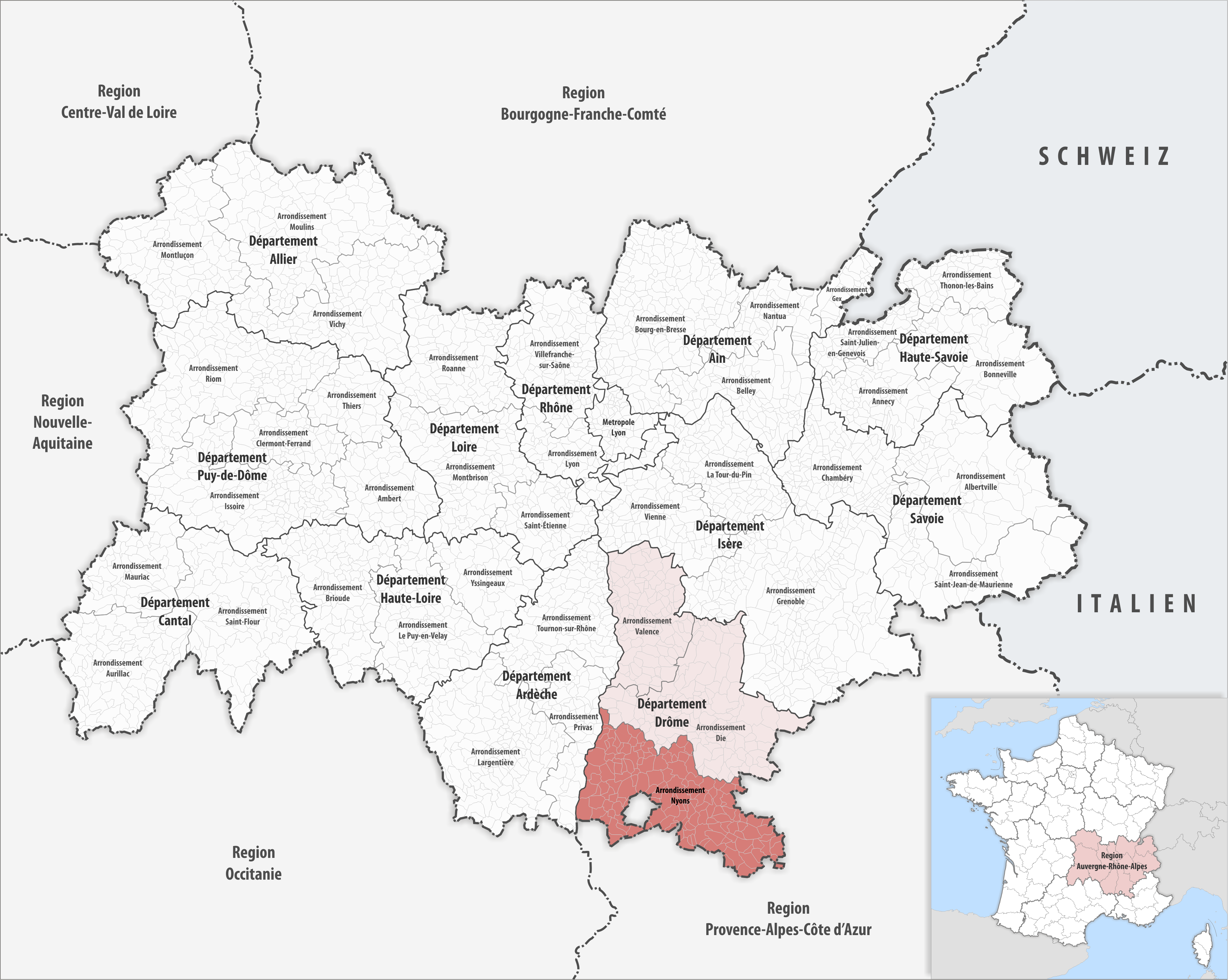
- Location within the region Auvergne-Rhône-Alpes
- Country: France
- Region: Auvergne-Rhône-Alpes
- Department: Drôme
- No. of communes: {{{nbcomm}}}
- Area: 2,489.7 km^{2} (961.3 sq mi)
- Population (2023): 153,748
  - Density: 61.754/km^{2} (159.94/sq mi)
- INSEE code: 262

The arrondissement of Nyons is an arrondissement of France in the Drôme department in the Auvergne-Rhône-Alpes region. It has 150 communes. Its population is 152,789 (2021), and its area is 2,489.7 km^{2} (961.3 sq mi).

== Composition ==
The 150 communes of the arrondissement of Nyons, and their INSEE codes, are:

- Aleyrac (26003)
- Allan (26005)
- Ancône (26008)
- Arpavon (26013)
- Aubres (26016)
- Aulan (26018)
- Ballons (26022)
- Barret-de-Lioure (26026)
- La Bâtie-Rolland (26031)
- La Baume-de-Transit (26033)
- Beauvoisin (26043)
- La Bégude-de-Mazenc (26045)
- Bellecombe-Tarendol (26046)
- Bénivay-Ollon (26048)
- Bésignan (26050)
- Bézaudun-sur-Bîne (26051)
- Bonlieu-sur-Roubion (26052)
- Bouchet (26054)
- Bourdeaux (26056)
- Bouvières (26060)
- Buis-les-Baronnies (26063)
- Chamaret (26070)
- Chantemerle-lès-Grignan (26073)
- La Charce (26075)
- Charols (26078)
- Châteauneuf-de-Bordette (26082)
- Châteauneuf-du-Rhône (26085)
- Chaudebonne (26089)
- Chauvac-Laux-Montaux (26091)
- Clansayes (26093)
- Cléon-d'Andran (26095)
- Colonzelle (26099)
- Comps (26101)
- Condillac (26102)
- Condorcet (26103)
- Cornillac (26104)
- Cornillon-sur-l'Oule (26105)
- La Coucourde (26106)
- Crupies (26111)
- Curnier (26112)
- Dieulefit (26114)
- Donzère (26116)
- Espeluche (26121)
- Eygalayes (26126)
- Eygaliers (26127)
- Eyroles (26130)
- Eyzahut (26131)
- Ferrassières (26135)
- La Garde-Adhémar (26138)
- Les Granges-Gontardes (26145)
- Grignan (26146)
- Izon-la-Bruisse (26150)
- Laborel (26153)
- Lachau (26154)
- La Laupie (26157)
- Lemps (26161)
- Malataverne (26169)
- Manas (26171)
- Marsanne (26176)
- Mérindol-les-Oliviers (26180)
- Mévouillon (26181)
- Mirabel-aux-Baronnies (26182)
- Mollans-sur-Ouvèze (26188)
- Montauban-sur-l'Ouvèze (26189)
- Montaulieu (26190)
- Montboucher-sur-Jabron (26191)
- Montbrison-sur-Lez (26192)
- Montbrun-les-Bains (26193)
- Montélimar (26198)
- Montferrand-la-Fare (26199)
- Montfroc (26200)
- Montguers (26201)
- Montjoux (26202)
- Montjoyer (26203)
- Montréal-les-Sources (26209)
- Montségur-sur-Lauzon (26211)
- Nyons (26220)
- Orcinas (26222)
- Le Pègue (26226)
- Pelonne (26227)
- La Penne-sur-l'Ouvèze (26229)
- Piégon (26233)
- Pierrelatte (26235)
- Pierrelongue (26236)
- Les Pilles (26238)
- Plaisians (26239)
- Le Poët-en-Percip (26242)
- Le Poët-Laval (26243)
- Le Poët-Sigillat (26244)
- Pommerol (26245)
- Pont-de-Barret (26249)
- Portes-en-Valdaine (26251)
- Propiac (26256)
- Puygiron (26257)
- Puy-Saint-Martin (26258)
- Réauville (26261)
- Reilhanette (26263)
- Rémuzat (26264)
- Rioms (26267)
- Rochebaudin (26268)
- Rochebrune (26269)
- Rochefort-en-Valdaine (26272)
- Rochegude (26275)
- Roche-Saint-Secret-Béconne (26276)
- La Roche-sur-le-Buis (26278)
- La Rochette-du-Buis (26279)
- Roussas (26284)
- Rousset-les-Vignes (26285)
- Roussieux (26286)
- Roynac (26287)
- Sahune (26288)
- Saint-Auban-sur-l'Ouvèze (26292)
- Sainte-Euphémie-sur-Ouvèze (26303)
- Sainte-Jalle (26306)
- Saint-Ferréol-Trente-Pas (26304)
- Saint-Gervais-sur-Roubion (26305)
- Saint-Marcel-lès-Sauzet (26312)
- Saint-Maurice-sur-Eygues (26317)
- Saint-May (26318)
- Saint-Pantaléon-les-Vignes (26322)
- Saint-Paul-Trois-Châteaux (26324)
- Saint-Restitut (26326)
- Saint-Sauveur-Gouvernet (26329)
- Salettes (26334)
- Salles-sous-Bois (26335)
- Saulce-sur-Rhône (26337)
- Sauzet (26338)
- Savasse (26339)
- Séderon (26340)
- Solérieux (26342)
- Souspierre (26343)
- Suze-la-Rousse (26345)
- Taulignan (26348)
- Teyssières (26350)
- Les Tonils (26351)
- La Touche (26352)
- Les Tourrettes (26353)
- Truinas (26356)
- Tulette (26357)
- Valaurie (26360)
- Valouse (26363)
- Venterol (26367)
- Verclause (26369)
- Vercoiran (26370)
- Vers-sur-Méouge (26372)
- Vesc (26373)
- Villebois-les-Pins (26374)
- Villefranche-le-Château (26375)
- Villeperdrix (26376)
- Vinsobres (26377)

== History ==
The arrondissement of Nyons was created in 1800. In 2006 it absorbed the four cantons of Dieulefit, Marsanne, Montélimar-1 and Montélimar-2 from the arrondissement of Valence. At the January 2017 reorganisation of the arrondissements of Drôme, it gained one commune from the arrondissement of Valence and six communes from the arrondissement of Die.

As a result of the reorganisation of the cantons of France which came into effect in 2015, the borders of the cantons are no longer related to the borders of the arrondissements. The eleven cantons of the arrondissement of Nyons were, as of January 2015:

- Buis-les-Baronnies
- Dieulefit
- Grignan
- Marsanne
- Montélimar-1
- Montélimar-2
- Nyons
- Pierrelatte
- Rémuzat
- Saint-Paul-Trois-Châteaux
- Séderon
