= Crupies =

- Commune
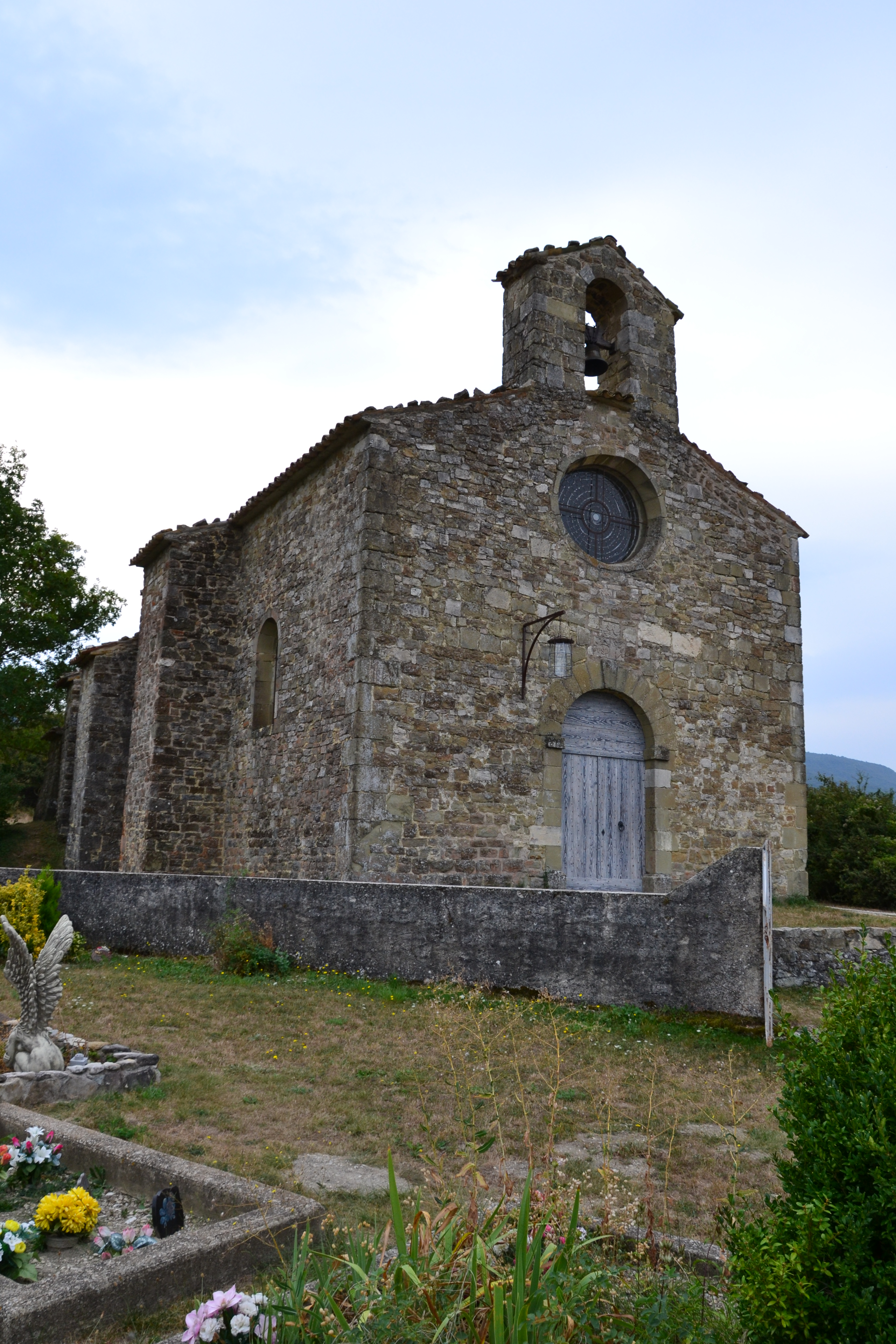
- The chapel of Saint-Jean, in Crupies
- Location of Crupies
- Location within France Location within Auvergne-Rhône-Alpes
- Coordinates: 44°33′17″N 5°10′25″E
- Country: France
- Region: Auvergne-Rhône-Alpes
- Department: Drôme
- Arrondissement: Nyons
- Canton: Dieulefit
- Intercommunality: Dieulefit-Bourdeaux

Government
  - Mayor (2020–2026): Lionel Vincent
- Area^{1}: 13.16 km^{2} (5.08 sq mi)
- Highest elevation: 1,088 m (3,570 ft)
- Lowest elevation: 429 m (1,407 ft)
- Population (2023): 96
  - Density: 7.3/km^{2} (19/sq mi)
- Time zone: UTC+01:00 (CET)
  - Summer (DST): UTC+02:00 (CEST)
- INSEE/Postal code: 26111 /26460
- ^{1} French Land Register data, which excludes lakes, ponds, glaciers > 1 km^{2} (0.386 sq mi or 247 acres) and river estuaries.

Crupies (French pronunciation: [kʁypi]; Occitan: Crúpias) is a commune in the Drôme department in southeastern France.

== Population ==
Historical population
Year	Pop.	±% p.a.
1968	80	—
1975	85	+0.87%
1982	86	+0.17%
1990	79	−1.06%
1999	89	+1.33%
2007	93	+0.55%
2012	91	−0.43%
2017	100	+1.90%
2023	96	−0.68%
Source: INSEE

== See also ==
- Communes of the Drôme department
