= Félines-sur-Rimandoule =

- Commune
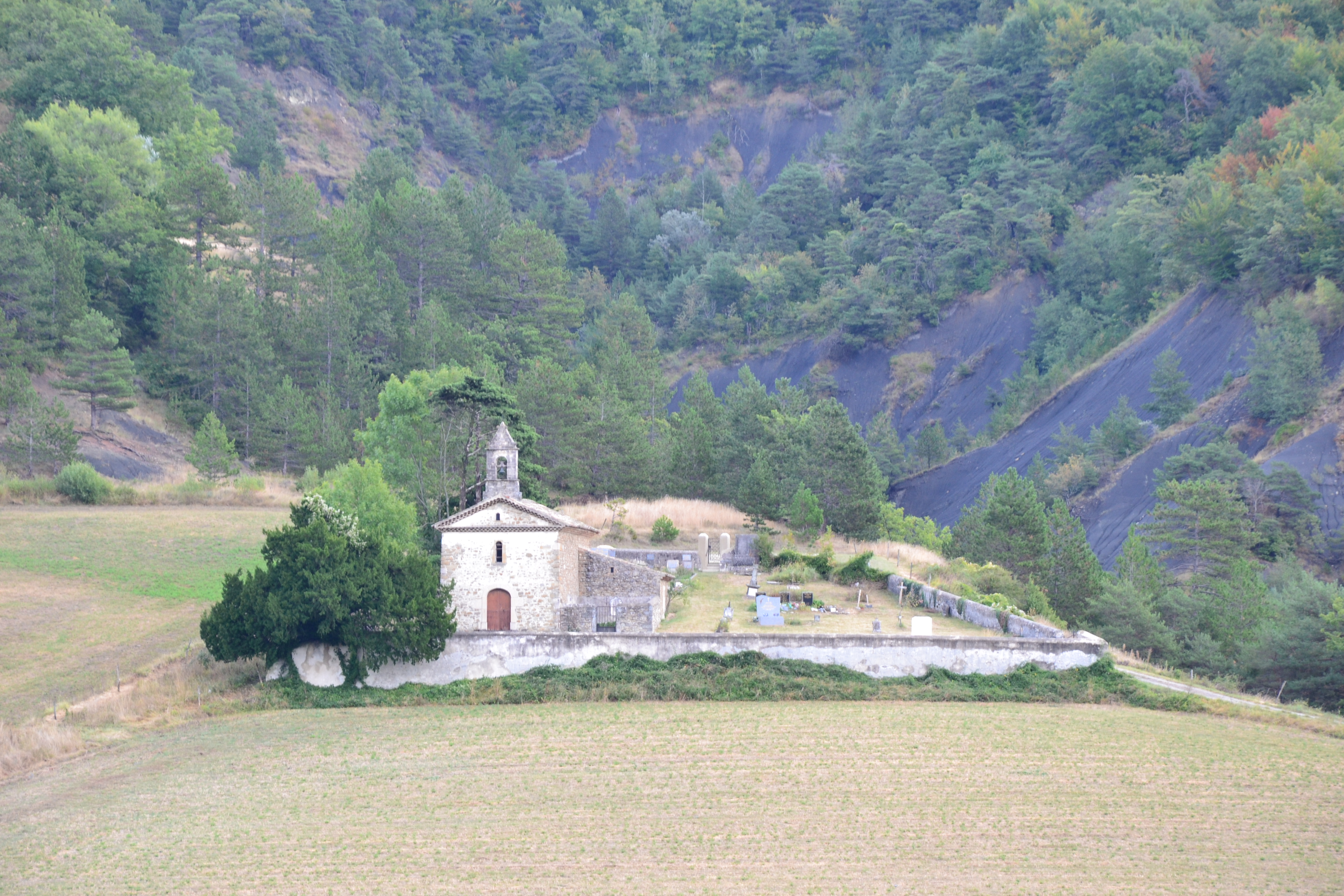
- The chapel of Saint Antoine in Félines-sur-Rimandoule
- Location of Félines-sur-Rimandoule
- Location within France Location within Auvergne-Rhône-Alpes
- Coordinates: 44°35′04″N 5°03′11″E
- Country: France
- Region: Auvergne-Rhône-Alpes
- Department: Drôme
- Arrondissement: Die
- Canton: Dieulefit
- Intercommunality: Val de Drôme en Biovallée

Government
  - Mayor (2020–2026): Loïc Morel
- Area^{1}: 8.46 km^{2} (3.27 sq mi)
- Highest elevation: 969 m (3,179 ft)
- Lowest elevation: 346 m (1,135 ft)
- Population (2023): 83
  - Density: 9.8/km^{2} (25/sq mi)
- Time zone: UTC+01:00 (CET)
  - Summer (DST): UTC+02:00 (CEST)
- INSEE/Postal code: 26134 /26160
- ^{1} French Land Register data, which excludes lakes, ponds, glaciers > 1 km^{2} (0.386 sq mi or 247 acres) and river estuaries.

Félines-sur-Rimandoule (French pronunciation: [felin syʁ ʁimɑ̃dul]) is a commune in the Drôme department in the Auvergne-Rhône-Alpes region in southeastern France.

== Population ==
Historical population
Year	Pop.	±% p.a.
1968	69	—
1975	78	+1.77%
1982	86	+1.40%
1990	85	−0.15%
1999	71	−1.98%
2007	66	−0.91%
2012	71	+1.47%
2017	79	+2.16%
2023	83	+0.83%
Source: INSEE

== See also ==
- Communes of the Drôme department
