= Pont-de-Barret =

- Commune
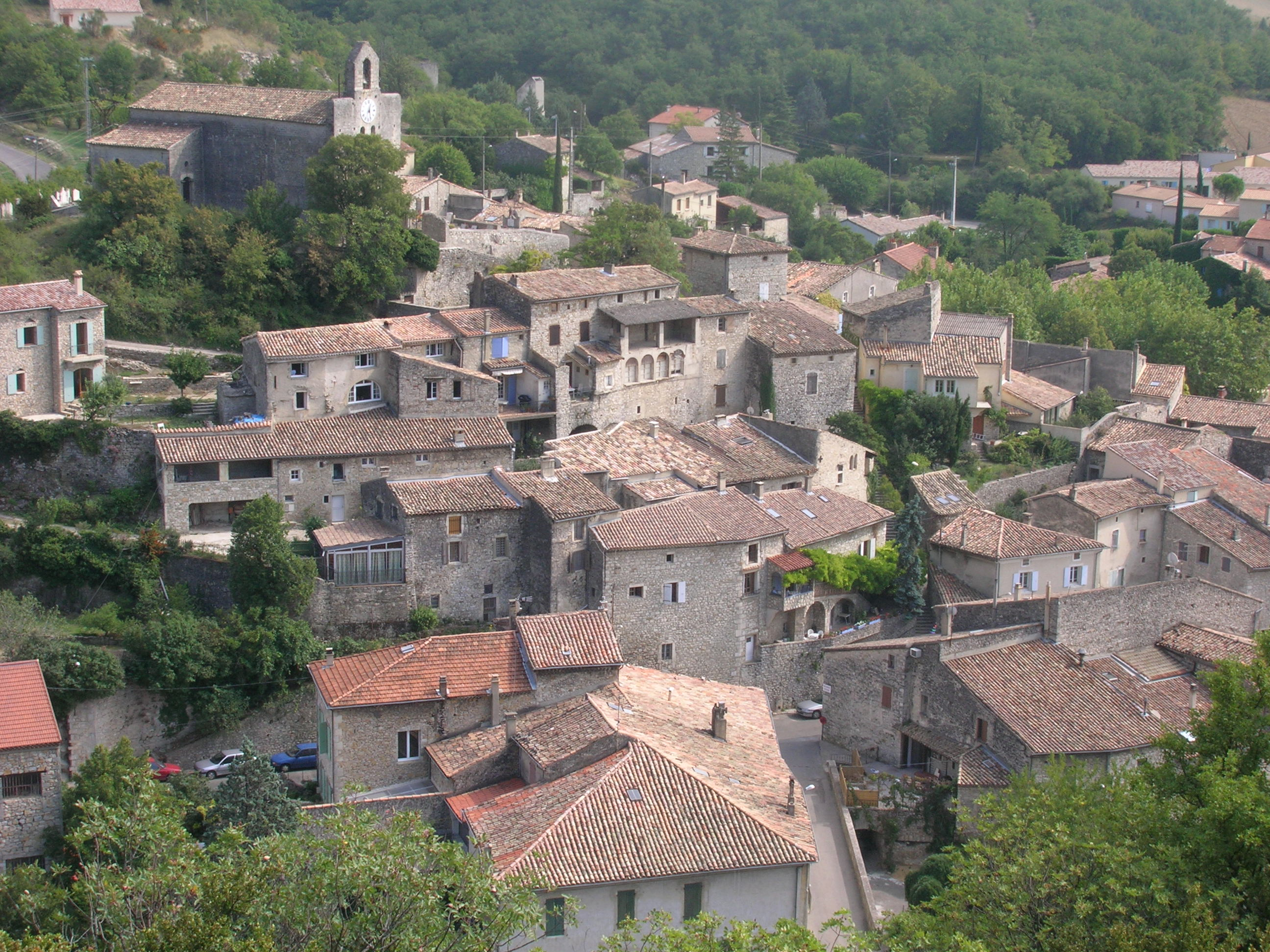
- A general view of Pont-de-Barret
- Location of Pont-de-Barret
- Location within France Location within Auvergne-Rhône-Alpes
- Coordinates: 44°36′10″N 5°00′42″E
- Country: France
- Region: Auvergne-Rhône-Alpes
- Department: Drôme
- Arrondissement: Nyons
- Canton: Dieulefit

Government
  - Mayor (2020–2026): Robert Palluel
- Area^{1}: 16.60 km^{2} (6.41 sq mi)
- Elevation: 220 m (720 ft)
- Highest elevation: 623 m (2,044 ft)
- Lowest elevation: 206 m (676 ft)
- Population (2023): 657
  - Density: 39.6/km^{2} (103/sq mi)
- Time zone: UTC+01:00 (CET)
  - Summer (DST): UTC+02:00 (CEST)
- INSEE/Postal code: 26249 /26160
- ^{1} French Land Register data, which excludes lakes, ponds, glaciers > 1 km^{2} (0.386 sq mi or 247 acres) and river estuaries.

Pont-de-Barret (French pronunciation: [pɔ̃ də baʁɛ]) is a commune in the Drôme department in southeastern France.

== Relief and Geology ==
Special Sites:

- Les Côtes de Sevaine (341 m);
- Montagne de Briesse (575 m);
- Montagne de Sainte-Euphémie (608 m);
- Serre de la Bâtarde;
- Serre Vivier (300 m).

== Population ==
Historical population
Year	Pop.	±% p.a.
1968	431	—
1975	424	−0.23%
1982	385	−1.37%
1990	453	+2.05%
1999	459	+0.15%
2007	541	+2.08%
2012	624	+2.90%
2017	670	+1.43%
2023	657	−0.33%
Source: INSEE

== See also ==
- Communes of the Drôme department
