= Truinas =

- Commune
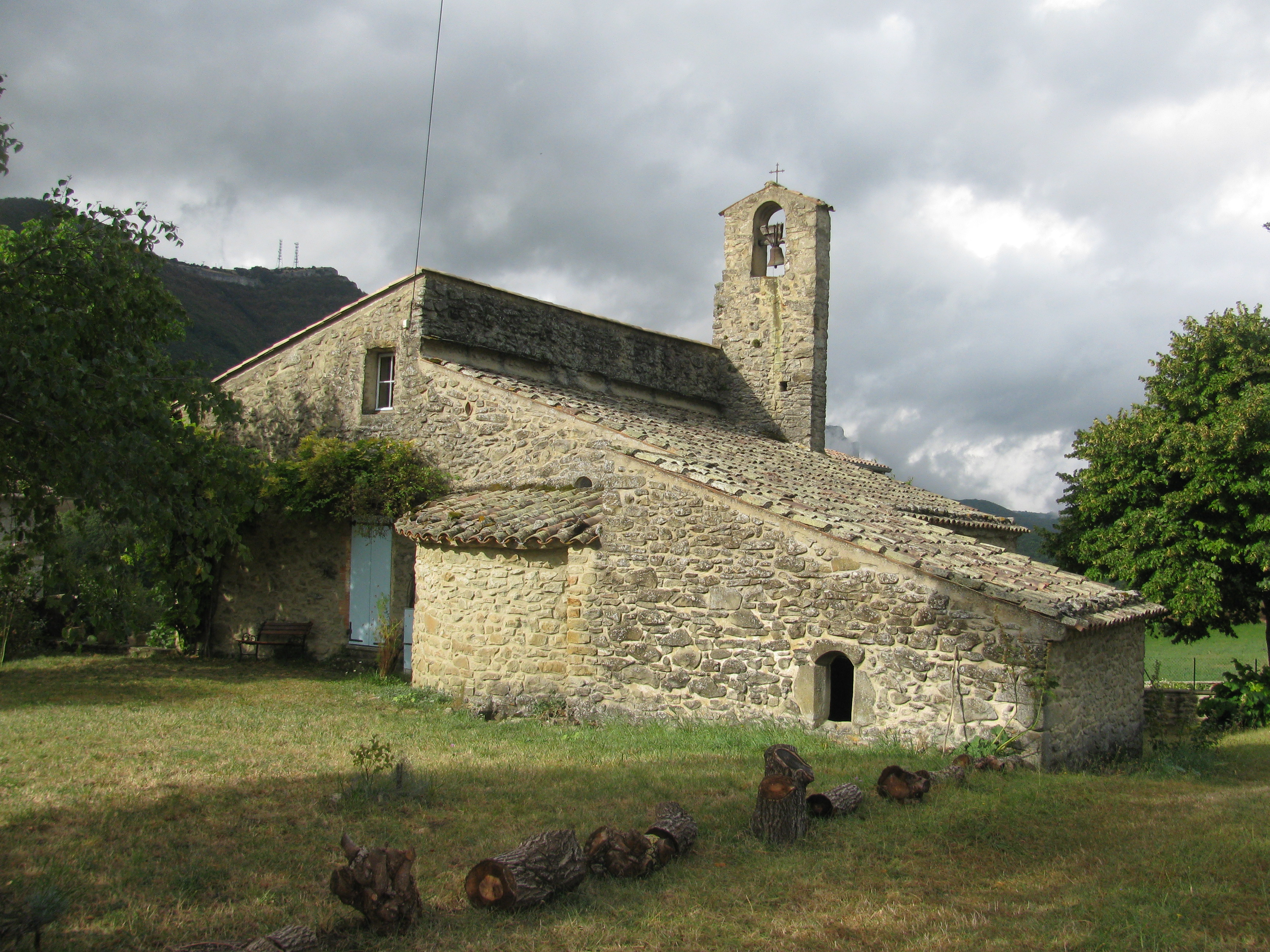
- The chapel of Saint-Maurice, in Truinas
- Location of Truinas
- Location within France Location within Auvergne-Rhône-Alpes
- Coordinates: 44°34′N 5°05′E
- Country: France
- Region: Auvergne-Rhône-Alpes
- Department: Drôme
- Arrondissement: Nyons
- Canton: Dieulefit
- Intercommunality: Dieulefit-Bourdeaux

Government
  - Mayor (2020–2026): Serge Terrot
- Area^{1}: 8.64 km^{2} (3.34 sq mi)
- Elevation: 500 m (1,600 ft)
- Highest elevation: 937 m (3,074 ft)
- Lowest elevation: 392 m (1,286 ft)
- Population (2023): 145
  - Density: 16.8/km^{2} (43.5/sq mi)
- Time zone: UTC+01:00 (CET)
  - Summer (DST): UTC+02:00 (CEST)
- INSEE/Postal code: 26356 /26460
- ^{1} French Land Register data, which excludes lakes, ponds, glaciers > 1 km^{2} (0.386 sq mi or 247 acres) and river estuaries.

Truinas is a commune in the Drôme department in southeastern France.

== Population ==
Historical population
Year	Pop.	±% p.a.
1968	117	—
1975	80	−5.29%
1982	104	+3.82%
1990	107	+0.36%
1999	112	+0.51%
2007	131	+1.98%
2012	130	−0.15%
2017	119	−1.75%
2023	145	+3.35%
Source: INSEE

== See also ==
- Communes of the Drôme department
