= Souspierre =

- Commune
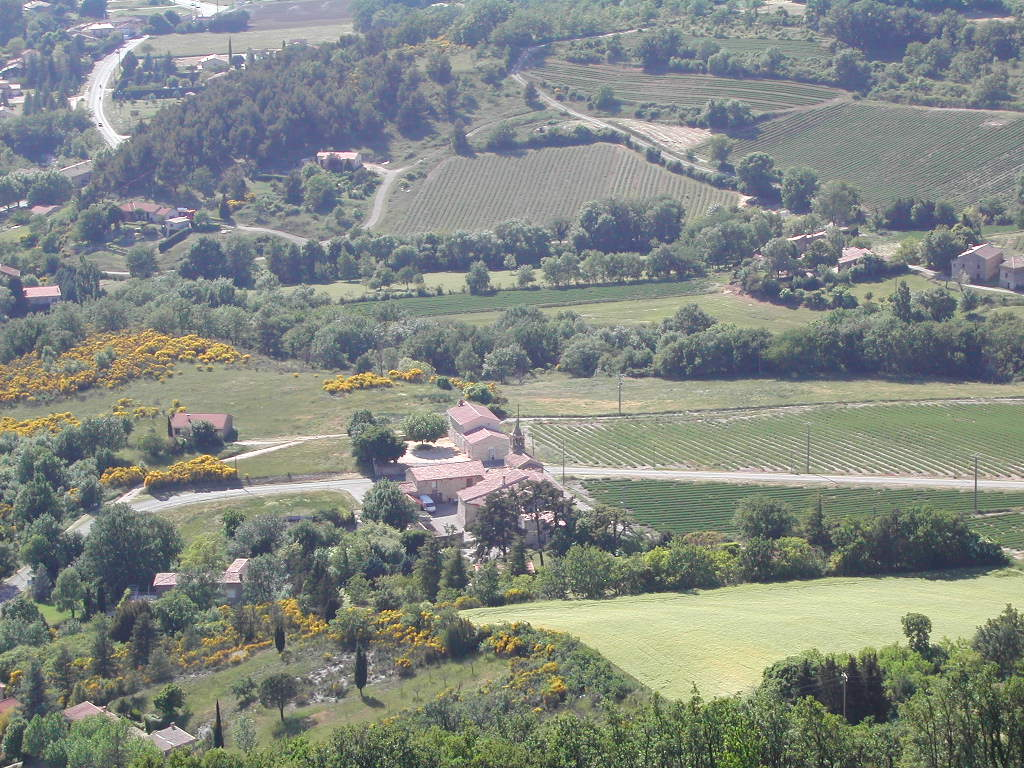
- A general view of Souspierre
- Location of Souspierre
- Location within France Location within Auvergne-Rhône-Alpes
- Coordinates: 44°32′31″N 4°57′36″E
- Country: France
- Region: Auvergne-Rhône-Alpes
- Department: Drôme
- Arrondissement: Nyons
- Canton: Dieulefit

Government
  - Mayor (2020–2026): Pierre Mossaz
- Area^{1}: 5.25 km^{2} (2.03 sq mi)
- Elevation: 250 m (820 ft)
- Highest elevation: 635 m (2,083 ft)
- Lowest elevation: 228 m (748 ft)
- Population (2023): 108
  - Density: 20.6/km^{2} (53.3/sq mi)
- Time zone: UTC+01:00 (CET)
  - Summer (DST): UTC+02:00 (CEST)
- INSEE/Postal code: 26343 /26160
- ^{1} French Land Register data, which excludes lakes, ponds, glaciers > 1 km^{2} (0.386 sq mi or 247 acres) and river estuaries.

Souspierre is a commune in the Drôme department in southeastern France.

== Population ==
Historical population
Year	Pop.	±% p.a.
1968	71	—
1975	72	+0.20%
1982	84	+2.23%
1990	99	+2.08%
1999	96	−0.34%
2007	102	+0.76%
2012	101	−0.20%
2017	97	−0.80%
2023	108	+1.81%
Source: INSEE

== See also ==
- Communes of the Drôme department
- Communes of France
