= Aleyrac =

- Commune
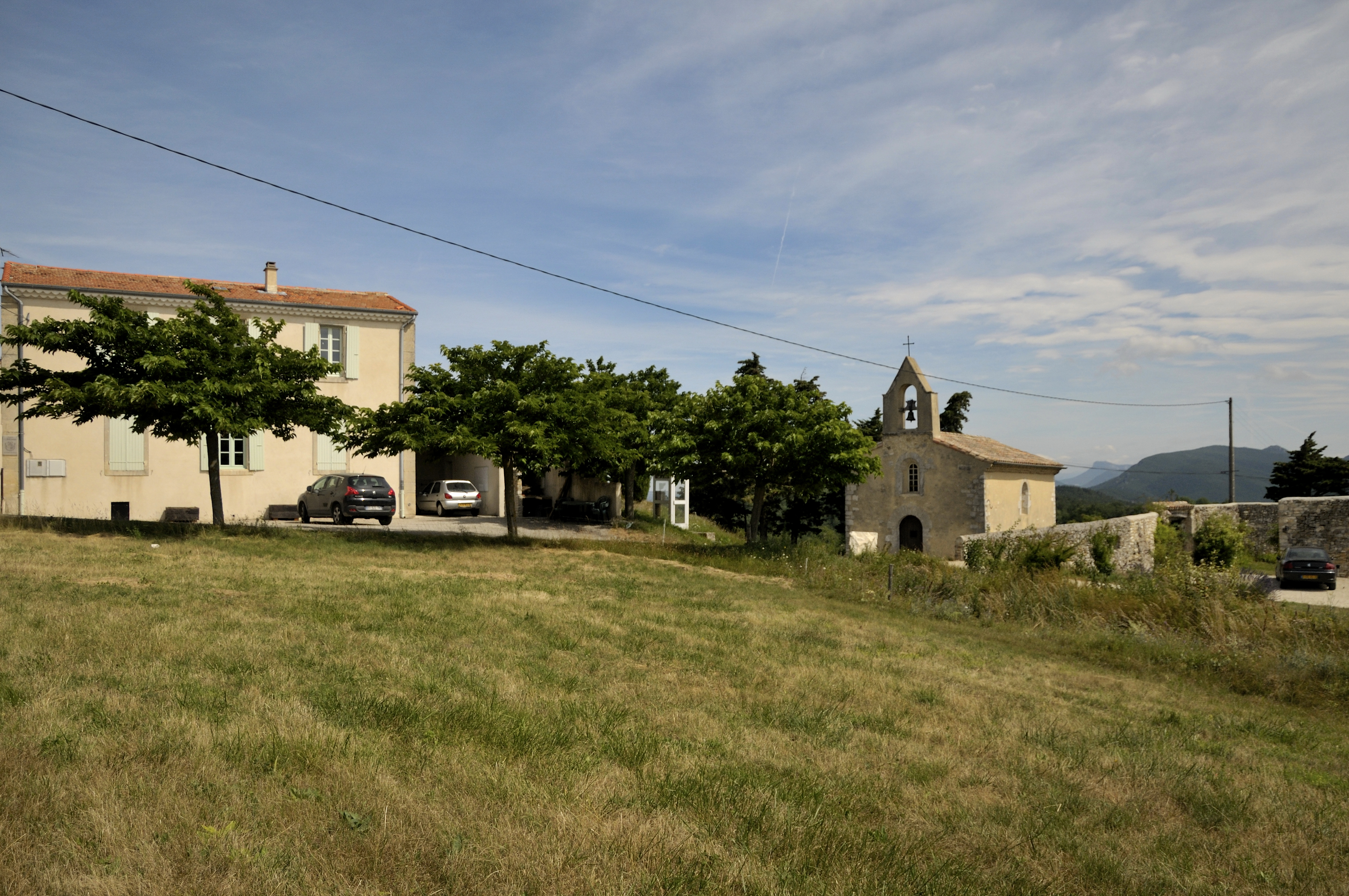
- The town hall and church
- Location of Aleyrac
- Location within France Location within Auvergne-Rhône-Alpes
- Coordinates: 44°29′59″N 4°56′20″E
- Country: France
- Region: Auvergne-Rhône-Alpes
- Department: Drôme
- Arrondissement: Nyons
- Canton: Dieulefit
- Intercommunality: Dieulefit-Bourdeaux

Government
  - Mayor (2020–2026): Dominique Arnaud
- Area^{1}: 6.65 km^{2} (2.57 sq mi)
- Highest elevation: 571 m (1,873 ft)
- Lowest elevation: 318 m (1,043 ft)
- Population (2023): 50
  - Density: 7.5/km^{2} (19/sq mi)
- Time zone: UTC+01:00 (CET)
  - Summer (DST): UTC+02:00 (CEST)
- INSEE/Postal code: 26003 /26770
- ^{1} French Land Register data, which excludes lakes, ponds, glaciers > 1 km^{2} (0.386 sq mi or 247 acres) and river estuaries.

Aleyrac (French pronunciation: [alɛʁak]; Occitan: Alairac) is a commune in the Drôme department in southeastern France.

== Population ==
Historical population
Year	Pop.	±% p.a.
1968	32	—
1975	33	+0.44%
1982	29	−1.83%
1990	39	+3.77%
1999	45	+1.60%
2007	44	−0.28%
2012	47	+1.33%
2017	47	+0.00%
2023	50	+1.04%
Source: INSEE

== See also ==
- Communes of the Drôme department
