= Saou =

- Commune
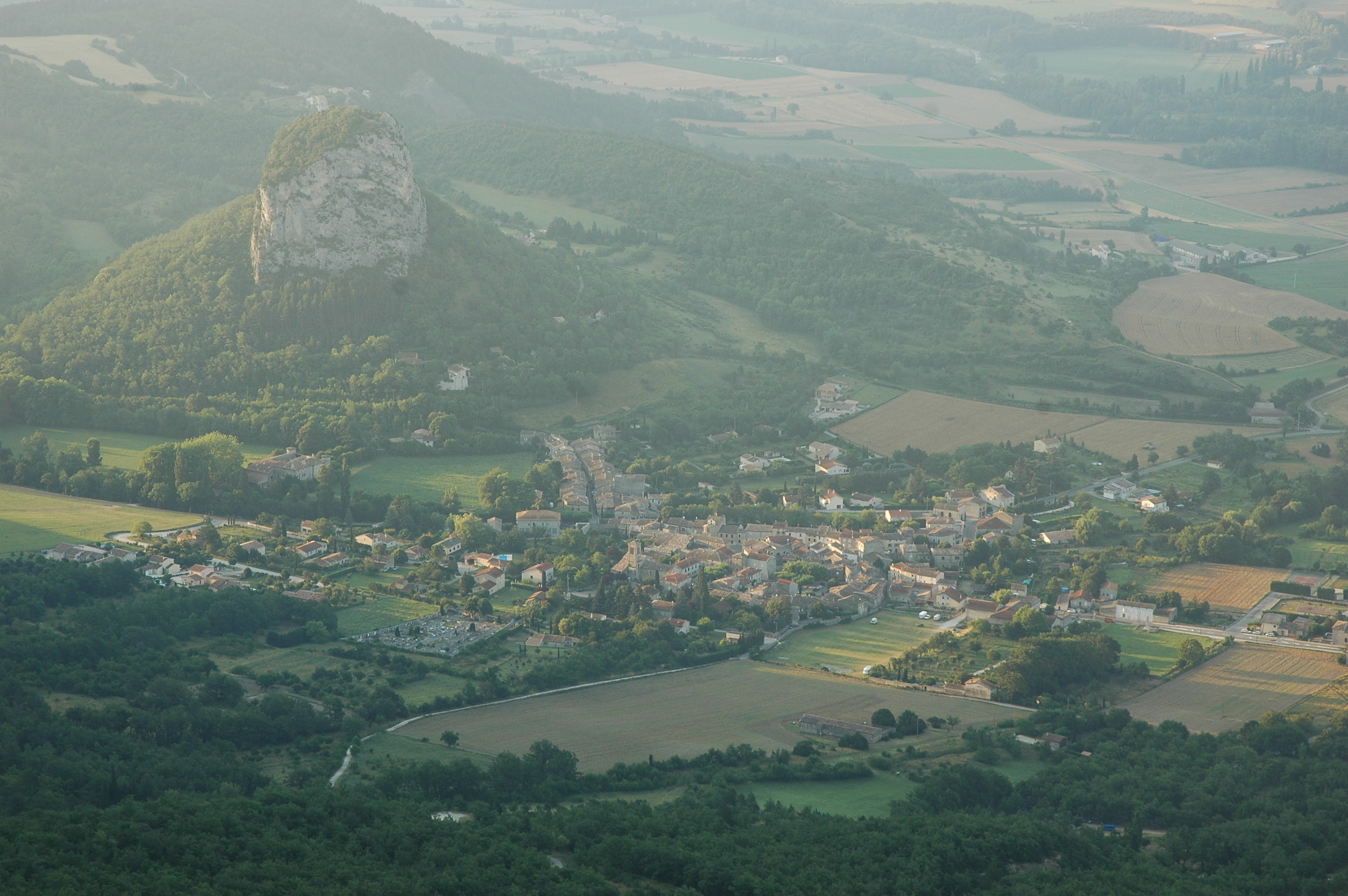
- Saou seen from La Poupoune
- Location of Saou
- Location within France Location within Auvergne-Rhône-Alpes
- Coordinates: 44°38′46″N 5°03′43″E
- Country: France
- Region: Auvergne-Rhône-Alpes
- Department: Drôme
- Arrondissement: Die
- Canton: Dieulefit
- Intercommunality: Val de Drôme en Biovallée

Government
  - Mayor (2020–2026): Raphaël Paillot
- Area^{1}: 41.6 km^{2} (16.1 sq mi)
- Elevation: 325 m (1,066 ft)
- Highest elevation: 1,567 m (5,141 ft)
- Lowest elevation: 288 m (945 ft)
- Population (2023): 590
  - Density: 14/km^{2} (37/sq mi)
- Time zone: UTC+01:00 (CET)
  - Summer (DST): UTC+02:00 (CEST)
- INSEE/Postal code: 26336 /26400
- ^{1} French Land Register data, which excludes lakes, ponds, glaciers > 1 km^{2} (0.386 sq mi or 247 acres) and river estuaries.

Saou (French pronunciation: [su]; Vivaro-Alpine: Sau) is a commune in the Drôme department in southeastern France.

== Population ==
Historical population
Year	Pop.	±% p.a.
1968	431	—
1975	354	−2.77%
1982	364	+0.40%
1990	378	+0.47%
1999	409	+0.88%
2007	503	+2.62%
2012	520	+0.67%
2017	571	+1.89%
2023	590	+0.55%
Source: INSEE

== Syncline ==
Saou is well known for its syncline.

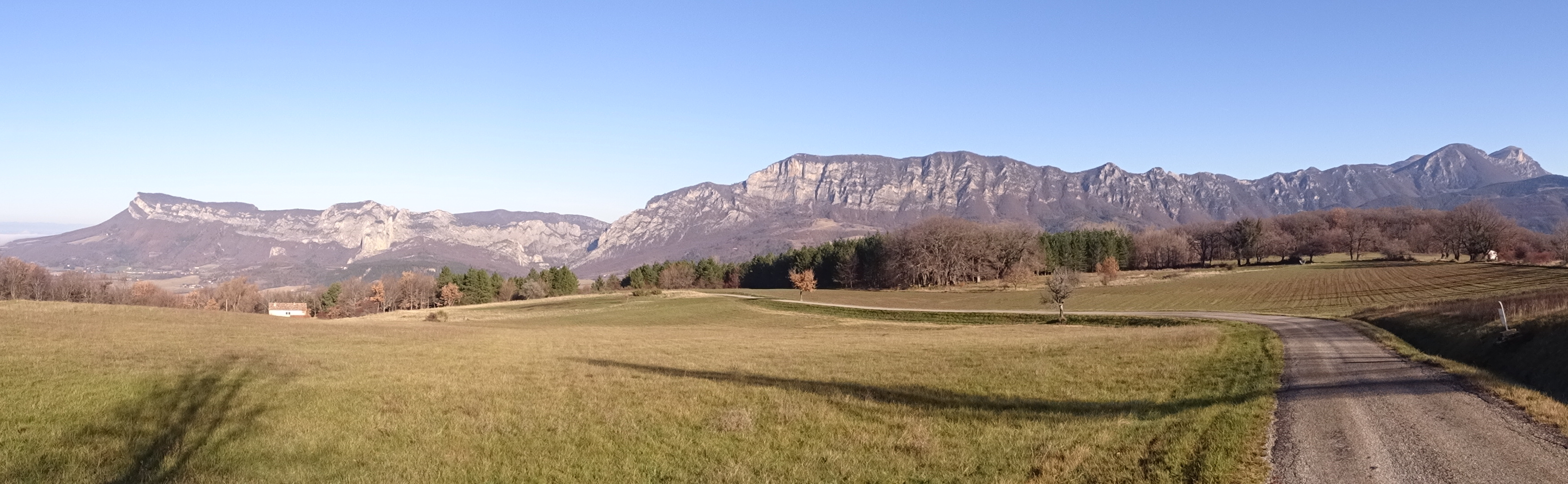
View of the whole syncline of the "Forêt de Saou" from the Lagier farm.

== See also ==
- Communes of the Drôme department
