= Roche-Saint-Secret-Béconne =

Roche-Saint-Secret-Béconne La Ròcha Sant Segret e Becona (Occitan)
- Commune
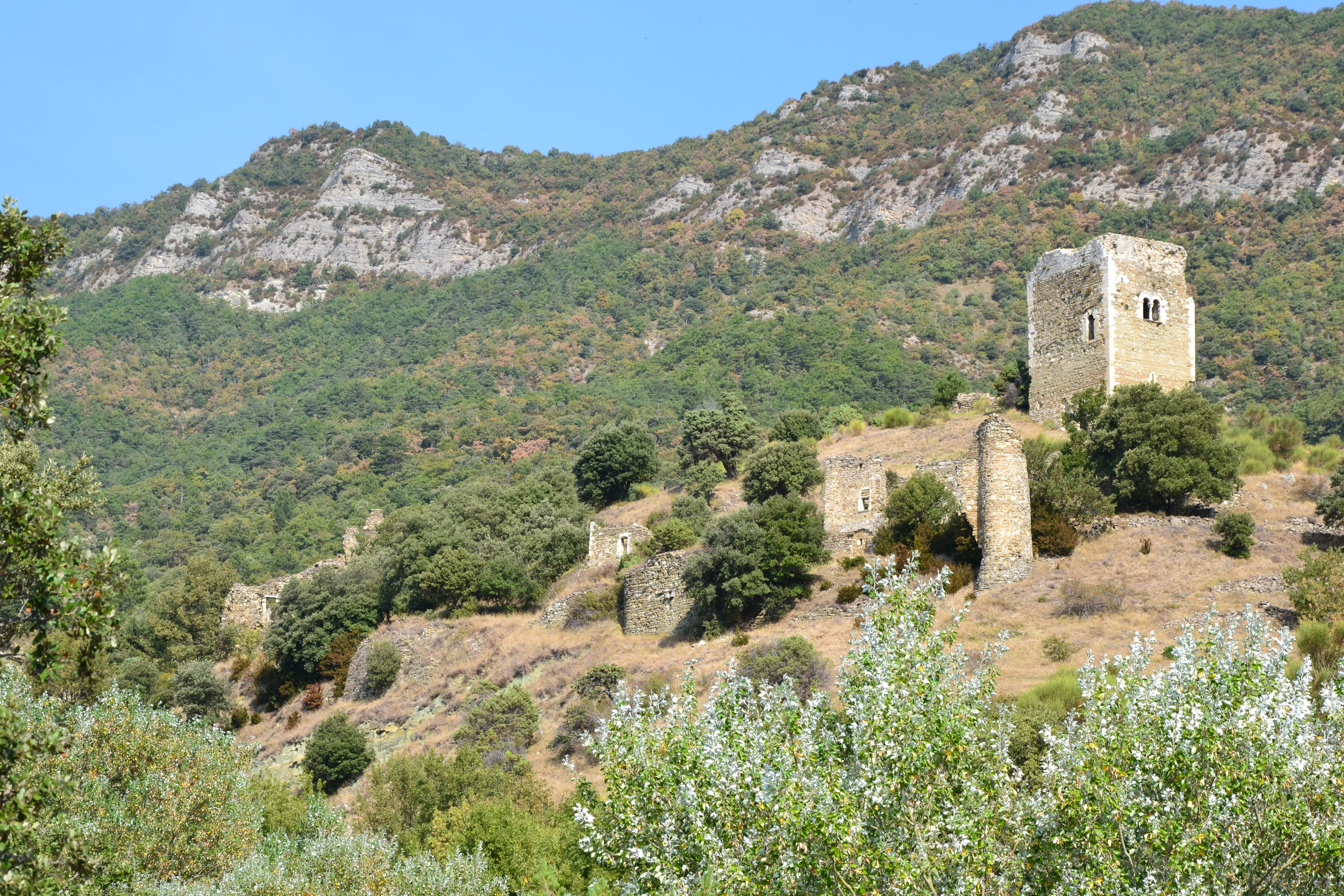
- A view of the Tour d'Alençon in the commune of Roche-Saint-Secret-Béconne
- Location of Roche-Saint-Secret-Béconne
- Location within France Location within Auvergne-Rhône-Alpes
- Coordinates: 44°28′41″N 5°01′46″E
- Country: France
- Region: Auvergne-Rhône-Alpes
- Department: Drôme
- Arrondissement: Nyons
- Canton: Dieulefit

Government
  - Mayor (2020–2026): Marc Liotard
- Area^{1}: 33.23 km^{2} (12.83 sq mi)
- Elevation: 365 m (1,198 ft)
- Highest elevation: 1,232 m (4,042 ft)
- Lowest elevation: 282 m (925 ft)
- Population (2023): 482
  - Density: 14.5/km^{2} (37.6/sq mi)
- Time zone: UTC+01:00 (CET)
  - Summer (DST): UTC+02:00 (CEST)
- INSEE/Postal code: 26276 /26770
- ^{1} French Land Register data, which excludes lakes, ponds, glaciers > 1 km^{2} (0.386 sq mi or 247 acres) and river estuaries.

Roche-Saint-Secret-Béconne (French pronunciation: [ʁɔʃ sɛ̃ səkʁɛ bekɔn]; Occitan: La Ròcha Sant Segret e Becona) is a commune in the Drôme department in the Auvergne-Rhône-Alpes region in Southeastern France.

== Demographics ==
Historical population
Year	Pop.	±% p.a.
1968	210	—
1975	213	+0.20%
1982	275	+3.72%
1990	313	+1.63%
1999	371	+1.91%
2007	359	−0.41%
2012	403	+2.34%
2017	452	+2.32%
2023	482	+1.08%
Source: INSEE

== See also ==
- Communes of the Drôme department
