= Mornans =

- Commune
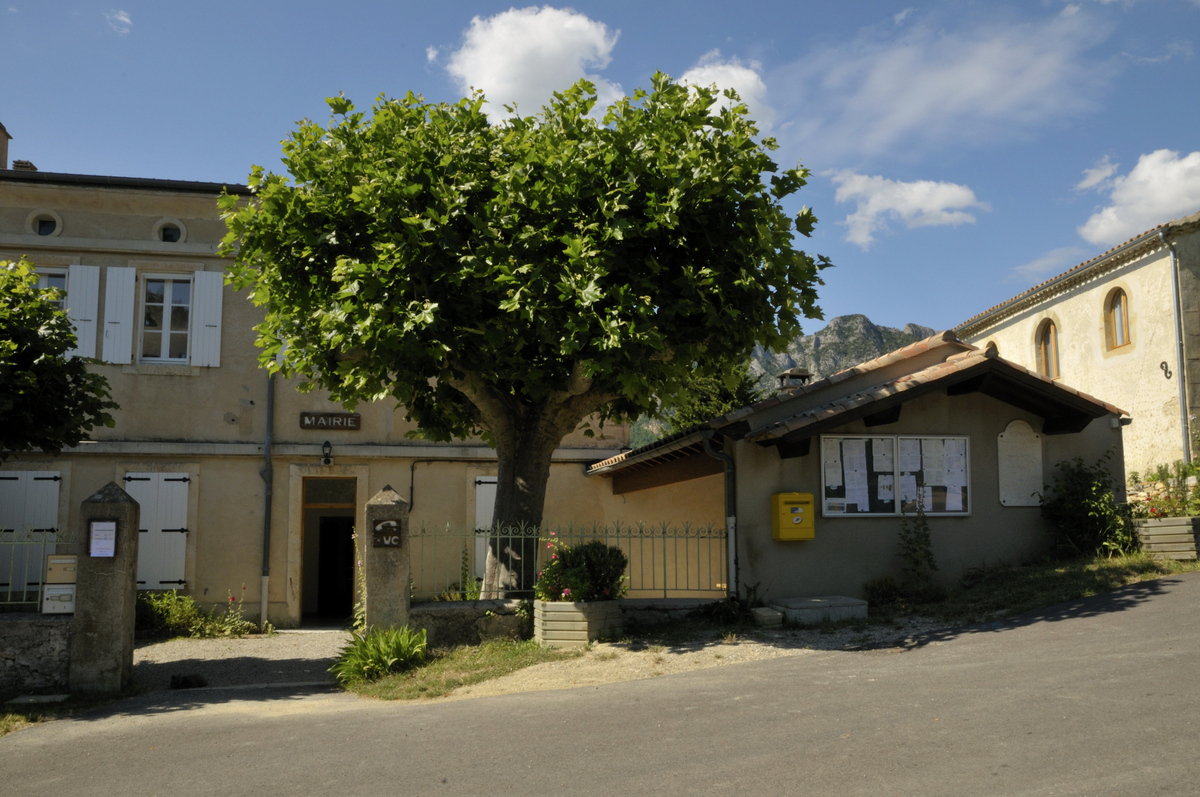
- Town hall
- Location of Mornans
- Location within France Location within Auvergne-Rhône-Alpes
- Coordinates: 44°37′15″N 5°07′33″E
- Country: France
- Region: Auvergne-Rhône-Alpes
- Department: Drôme
- Arrondissement: Die
- Canton: Dieulefit
- Intercommunality: Val de Drôme en Biovallée

Government
  - Mayor (2020–2026): Thierry Patonnier
- Area^{1}: 11.72 km^{2} (4.53 sq mi)
- Highest elevation: 1,307 m (4,288 ft)
- Lowest elevation: 339 m (1,112 ft)
- Population (2023): 76
  - Density: 6.5/km^{2} (17/sq mi)
- Time zone: UTC+01:00 (CET)
  - Summer (DST): UTC+02:00 (CEST)
- INSEE/Postal code: 26214 /26460
- ^{1} French Land Register data, which excludes lakes, ponds, glaciers > 1 km^{2} (0.386 sq mi or 247 acres) and river estuaries.

Mornans is a commune in the Drôme department in southeastern France.

== Population ==
Historical population
Year	Pop.	±% p.a.
1968	64	—
1975	62	−0.45%
1982	78	+3.33%
1990	68	−1.70%
1999	53	−2.73%
2007	70	+3.54%
2012	71	+0.28%
2017	72	+0.28%
2023	76	+0.91%
Source: INSEE

== See also ==
- Communes of the Drôme department
