= Soyans =

- Commune
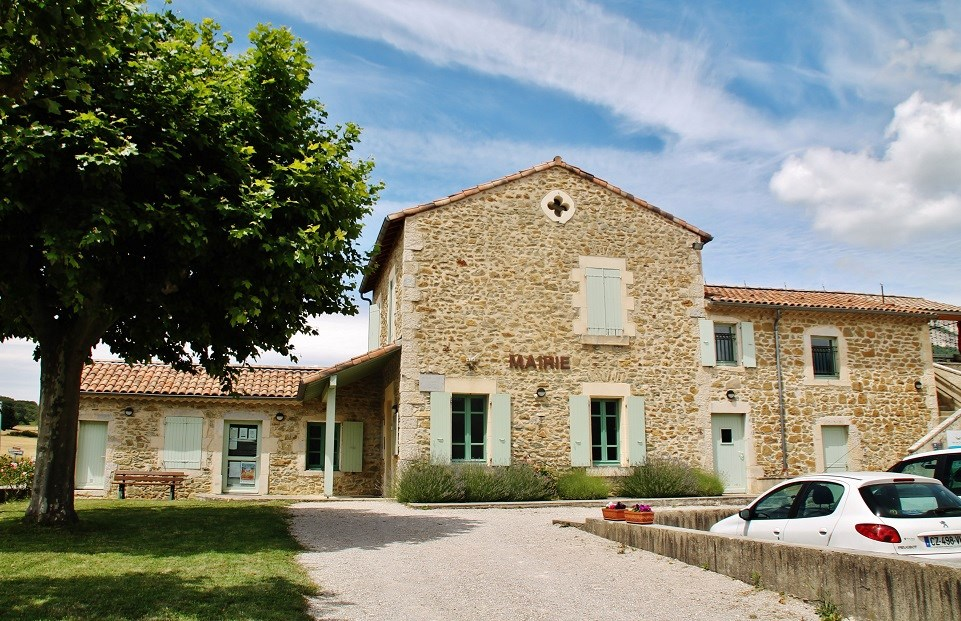
- The town hall in Soyans
- Location of Soyans
- Location within France Location within Auvergne-Rhône-Alpes
- Coordinates: 44°37′41″N 5°01′16″E
- Country: France
- Region: Auvergne-Rhône-Alpes
- Department: Drôme
- Arrondissement: Die
- Canton: Dieulefit
- Intercommunality: Val de Drôme en Biovallée

Government
  - Mayor (2020–2026): Geneviève Moulins-Dauvilliers
- Area^{1}: 25.64 km^{2} (9.90 sq mi)
- Elevation: 300 m (980 ft)
- Highest elevation: 878 m (2,881 ft)
- Lowest elevation: 255 m (837 ft)
- Population (2023): 405
  - Density: 15.8/km^{2} (40.9/sq mi)
- Time zone: UTC+01:00 (CET)
  - Summer (DST): UTC+02:00 (CEST)
- INSEE/Postal code: 26344 /26400
- ^{1} French Land Register data, which excludes lakes, ponds, glaciers > 1 km^{2} (0.386 sq mi or 247 acres) and river estuaries.

Soyans (French pronunciation: [swajɑ̃]) is a commune in the Drôme department in southeastern France.

== Population ==
Historical population
Year	Pop.	±% p.a.
1968	254	—
1975	225	−1.72%
1982	244	+1.16%
1990	253	+0.45%
1999	299	+1.87%
2007	332	+1.32%
2012	344	+0.71%
2017	388	+2.44%
2023	405	+0.72%
Source: INSEE

== See also ==
- Communes of the Drôme department
