= Vesc =

- Commune
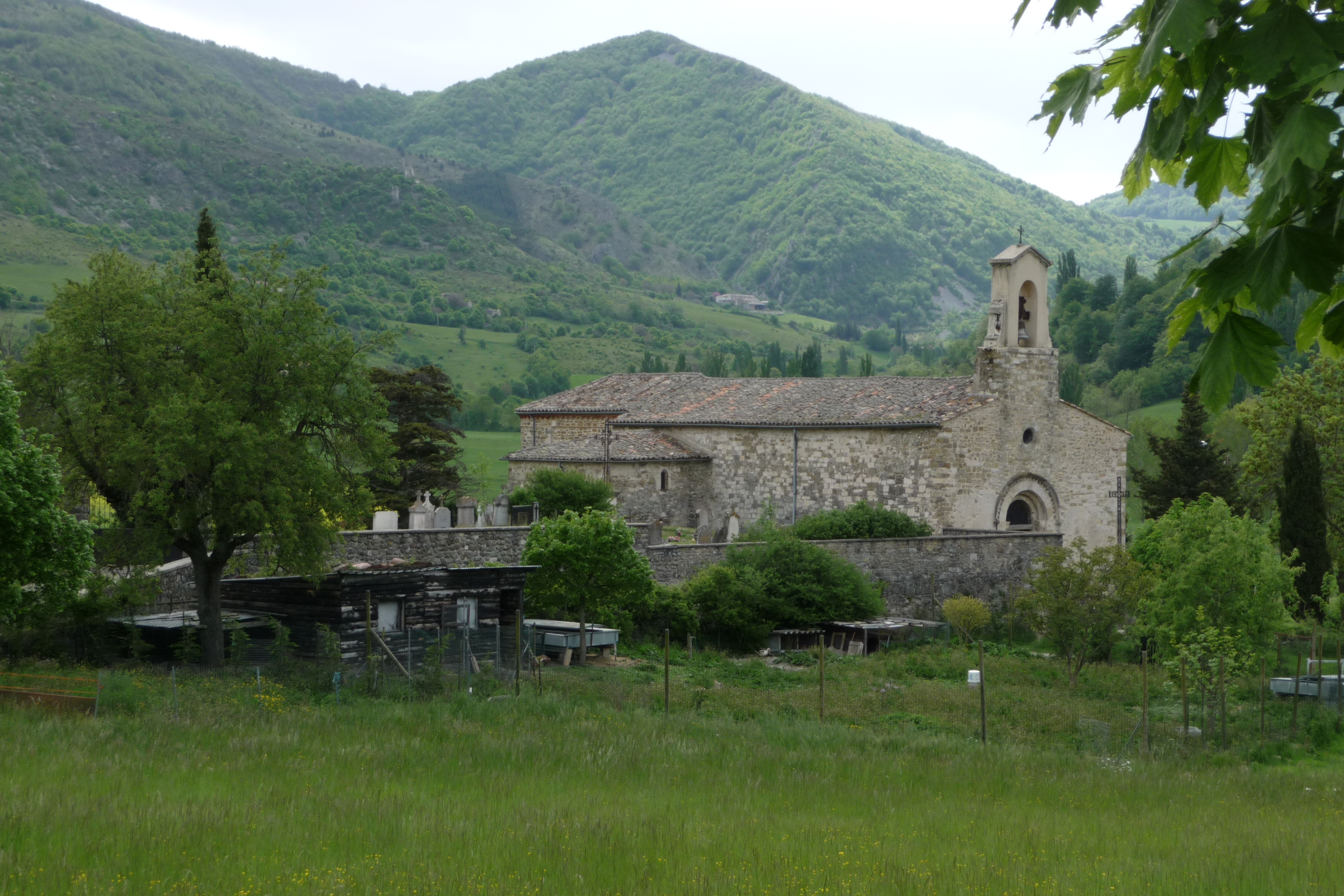
- The church in Vesc

- Coat of arms
- Location of Vesc
- Location within France Location within Auvergne-Rhône-Alpes
- Coordinates: 44°31′19″N 5°09′04″E
- Country: France
- Region: Auvergne-Rhône-Alpes
- Department: Drôme
- Arrondissement: Nyons
- Canton: Dieulefit

Government
  - Mayor (2020–2026): Alain Jeune
- Area^{1}: 40.48 km^{2} (15.63 sq mi)
- Elevation: 655 m (2,149 ft)
- Highest elevation: 1,448 m (4,751 ft)
- Lowest elevation: 477 m (1,565 ft)
- Population (2023): 261
  - Density: 6.45/km^{2} (16.7/sq mi)
- Time zone: UTC+01:00 (CET)
  - Summer (DST): UTC+02:00 (CEST)
- INSEE/Postal code: 26373 /26220
- ^{1} French Land Register data, which excludes lakes, ponds, glaciers > 1 km^{2} (0.386 sq mi or 247 acres) and river estuaries.

Vesc (French pronunciation: [vɛsk]; Occitan: Vesque) is a commune in the Drôme department in southeastern France.

== Population ==
Historical population
Year	Pop.	±% p.a.
1968	256	—
1975	229	−1.58%
1982	248	+1.15%
1990	244	−0.20%
1999	277	+1.42%
2007	279	+0.09%
2012	286	+0.50%
2017	260	−1.89%
2023	261	+0.06%
Source: INSEE

== See also ==
- Communes of the Drôme department
