= Bézaudun-sur-Bîne =

- Commune
- Location of Bézaudun-sur-Bîne
- Location within France Location within Auvergne-Rhône-Alpes
- Coordinates: 44°35′49″N 5°09′57″E
- Country: France
- Region: Auvergne-Rhône-Alpes
- Department: Drôme
- Arrondissement: Nyons
- Canton: Dieulefit
- Intercommunality: Dieulefit-Bourdeaux

Government
  - Mayor (2020–2026): Guy Bompard
- Area^{1}: 17.97 km^{2} (6.94 sq mi)
- Highest elevation: 1,532 m (5,026 ft)
- Lowest elevation: 439 m (1,440 ft)
- Population (2023): 73
  - Density: 4.1/km^{2} (11/sq mi)
- Time zone: UTC+01:00 (CET)
  - Summer (DST): UTC+02:00 (CEST)
- INSEE/Postal code: 26051 /26460
- ^{1} French Land Register data, which excludes lakes, ponds, glaciers > 1 km^{2} (0.386 sq mi or 247 acres) and river estuaries.

Bézaudun-sur-Bîne (French pronunciation: [bezodœ̃ syʁ bin]; Occitan: Besaudun) is a commune in the Drôme department in southeastern France.

== Population ==
Historical population
Year	Pop.	±% p.a.
1968	68	—
1975	68	+0.00%
1982	61	−1.54%
1990	47	−3.21%
1999	55	+1.76%
2007	84	+5.44%
2012	82	−0.48%
2017	68	−3.68%
2023	73	+1.19%
Source: INSEE

== See also ==
- Communes of the Drôme department
