= Rioms =

- Commune
- Location of Rioms
- Location within France Location within Auvergne-Rhône-Alpes
- Coordinates: 44°16′28″N 5°27′36″E
- Country: France
- Region: Auvergne-Rhône-Alpes
- Department: Drôme
- Arrondissement: Nyons
- Canton: Nyons et Baronnies

Government
  - Mayor (2020–2026): Annelise Farel
- Area^{1}: 9.39 km^{2} (3.63 sq mi)
- Elevation: 756 m (2,480 ft)
- Highest elevation: 1,304 m (4,278 ft)
- Lowest elevation: 630 m (2,070 ft)
- Population (2023): 26
  - Density: 2.8/km^{2} (7.2/sq mi)
- Time zone: UTC+01:00 (CET)
  - Summer (DST): UTC+02:00 (CEST)
- INSEE/Postal code: 26267 /26170
- ^{1} French Land Register data, which excludes lakes, ponds, glaciers > 1 km^{2} (0.386 sq mi or 247 acres) and river estuaries.

Rioms is a commune in the Drôme department in southeastern France.

== Population ==
Historical population
Year	Pop.	±% p.a.
1968	14	—
1975	9	−6.12%
1982	12	+4.20%
1990	18	+5.20%
1999	22	+2.25%
2007	22	+0.00%
2012	25	+2.59%
2017	26	+0.79%
2023	26	+0.00%
Source: INSEE

== See also ==
- Communes of the Drôme department
