= Orcinas =

- Commune
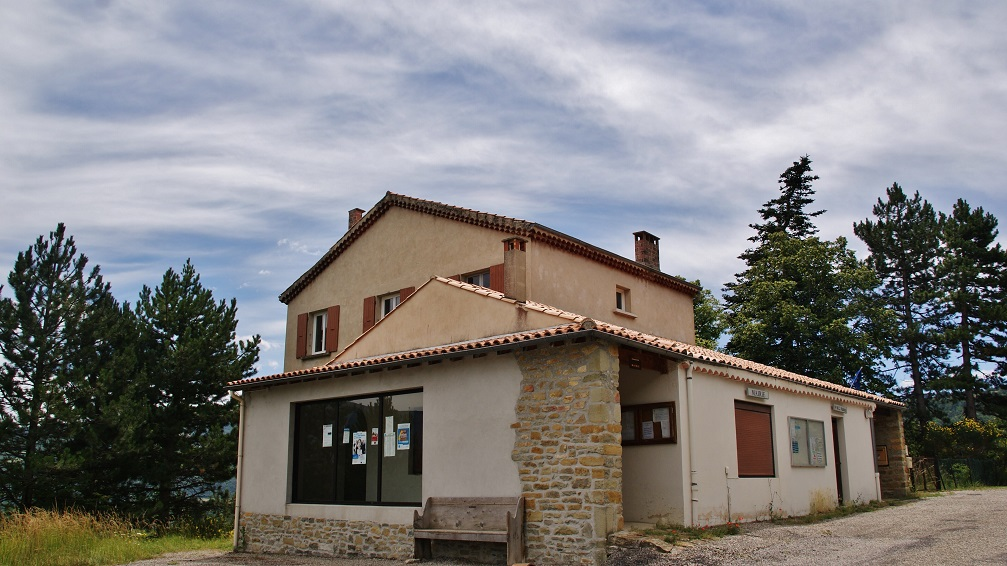
- The town hall of Orcinas
- Location of Orcinas
- Location within France Location within Auvergne-Rhône-Alpes
- Coordinates: 44°33′08″N 5°08′11″E
- Country: France
- Region: Auvergne-Rhône-Alpes
- Department: Drôme
- Arrondissement: Nyons
- Canton: Dieulefit
- Intercommunality: Dieulefit-Bourdeaux

Government
  - Mayor (2020–2026): Maurice Rousset
- Area^{1}: 5.27 km^{2} (2.03 sq mi)
- Highest elevation: 802 m (2,631 ft)
- Lowest elevation: 456 m (1,496 ft)
- Population (2023): 40
  - Density: 7.6/km^{2} (20/sq mi)
- Time zone: UTC+01:00 (CET)
  - Summer (DST): UTC+02:00 (CEST)
- INSEE/Postal code: 26222 /26220
- ^{1} French Land Register data, which excludes lakes, ponds, glaciers > 1 km^{2} (0.386 sq mi or 247 acres) and river estuaries.

Orcinas is a commune in the Drôme department in southeastern France.

== Population ==
Historical population
Year	Pop.	±% p.a.
1968	44	—
1975	36	−2.83%
1982	34	−0.81%
1990	32	−0.75%
1999	28	−1.47%
2007	28	+0.00%
2012	33	+3.34%
2017	38	+2.86%
2023	40	+0.86%
Source: INSEE

== See also ==
- Communes of the Drôme department
