= Communes of the Drôme department =

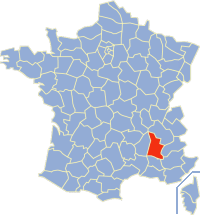

The following is a list of the 362 communes of the Drôme department of France.

The communes cooperate in the following intercommunalities (as of 2025):

- Communauté d'agglomération Arche Agglo (partly)
- Montélimar Agglomération
- Communauté d'agglomération Valence Romans Agglo
- Communauté de communes des Baronnies en Drôme Provençale
- Communauté de communes du Crestois et de Pays de Saillans Cœur de Drôme
- Communauté de communes Dieulefit-Bourdeaux
- Communauté de communes du Diois
- Communauté de communes Drôme Sud Provence
- Communauté de communes Enclave des Papes-Pays de Grignan (partly)
- Communauté de communes Jabron-Lure-Vançon-Durance (partly)
- Communauté de communes Porte de Dromardèche (partly)
- Communauté de communes du Royans-Vercors
- Communauté de communes du Sisteronais-Buëch (partly)
- Communauté de communes Vaison Ventoux (partly)
- Communauté de communes du Val de Drôme en Biovallée
- Communauté de communes Ventoux Sud (partly)

INSEE code	Postal code	Commune
26002	26140	Albon
26003	26770	Aleyrac
26004	26300	Alixan
26005	26780	Allan
26006	26400	Allex
26007	26800	Ambonil
26008	26200	Ancône
26009	26140	Andancette
26010	26140	Anneyron
26011	26400	Aouste-sur-Sye
26012	26470	Arnayon
26013	26110	Arpavon
26014	26260	Arthémonay
26015	26340	Aubenasson
26016	26110	Aubres
26017	26340	Aucelon
26018	26570	Aulan
26019	26340	Aurel
26021	26400	Autichamp
26022	26560	Ballons
26023	26300	Barbières
26024	26120	Barcelonne
26025	26310	Barnave
26026	26570	Barret-de-Lioure
26027	26150	Barsac
26028	26260	Bathernay
26030	26310	La Bâtie-des-Fonds
26031	26160	La Bâtie-Rolland
26032	26120	La Baume-Cornillane
26033	26790	La Baume-de-Transit
26034	26730	La Baume-d'Hostun
26035	26400	Beaufort-sur-Gervanne
26036	26310	Beaumont-en-Diois
26037	26760	Beaumont-lès-Valence
26038	26600	Beaumont-Monteux
26039	26300	Beauregard-Baret
26040	26310	Beaurières
26041	26240	Beausemblant
26042	26800	Beauvallon
26043	26170	Beauvoisin
26045	26160	La Bégude-de-Mazenc
26046	26110	Bellecombe-Tarendol
26047	26470	Bellegarde-en-Diois
26048	26170	Bénivay-Ollon
26049	26300	Bésayes
26050	26110	Bésignan
26051	26460	Bézaudun-sur-Bîne
26052	26160	Bonlieu-sur-Roubion
26054	26790	Bouchet
26055	26410	Boulc
26056	26460	Bourdeaux
26057	26300	Bourg-de-Péage
26058	26500	Bourg-lès-Valence
26059	26190	Bouvante
26060	26460	Bouvières
26061	26260	Bren
26062	26340	Brette
26063	26170	Buis-les-Baronnies
26064	26120	Chabeuil
26065	26400	Chabrillan
26066	26190	Le Chaffal
26067	26340	Chalancon
26068	26350	Le Chalon
26069	26150	Chamaloc
26070	26230	Chamaret
26071	26600	Chanos-Curson
26072	26600	Chantemerle-les-Blés
26073	26230	Chantemerle-lès-Grignan
26074	26420	La Chapelle-en-Vercors
26075	26470	La Charce
26076	26310	Charens
26077	26260	Charmes-sur-l'Herbasse
26078	26450	Charols
26079	26300	Charpey
26080	26340	Chastel-Arnaud
26081	26120	Châteaudouble
26082	26110	Châteauneuf-de-Bordette
26083	26330	Châteauneuf-de-Galaure
26085	26780	Châteauneuf-du-Rhône
26084	26300	Châteauneuf-sur-Isère
26086	26410	Châtillon-en-Diois
26087	26750	Châtillon-Saint-Jean
26088	26300	Chatuzange-le-Goubet
26089	26110	Chaudebonne
26090	26340	La Chaudière
26091	26510	Chauvac-Laux-Montaux
26092	26260	Chavannes
26093	26130	Clansayes
26094	26240	Claveyson
26095	26450	Cléon-d'Andran
26096	26260	Clérieux
26097	26270	Cliousclat
26098	26400	Cobonne
26099	26230	Colonzelle
26100	26120	Combovin
26101	26220	Comps
26102	26740	Condillac
26103	26110	Condorcet
26104	26510	Cornillac
26105	26510	Cornillon-sur-l'Oule
26106	26740	La Coucourde
26107	26350	Crépol
26108	26400	Crest
26110	26600	Crozes-Hermitage
26111	26460	Crupies
26112	26110	Curnier
26113	26150	Die
26114	26220	Dieulefit
26115	26400	Divajeu
26116	26290	Donzère
26117	26190	Échevis
26118	26210	Épinouze
26119	26600	Érôme
26121	26780	Espeluche
26122	26340	Espenel
26123	26470	Establet
26124	26800	Étoile-sur-Rhône
26125	26400	Eurre
26126	26560	Eygalayes
26127	26170	Eygaliers
26128	26400	Eygluy-Escoulin
26129	26730	Eymeux
26130	26110	Eyroles
26131	26160	Eyzahut
26133	26240	Fay-le-Clos
26134	26160	Félines-sur-Rimandoule
26135	26570	Ferrassières
26137	26400	Francillon-sur-Roubion
26138	26700	La Garde-Adhémar
26139	26750	Génissieux
26380	26600	Gervans
26140	26750	Geyssans
26141	26400	Gigors-et-Lozeron
26142	26410	Glandage
26143	26530	Le Grand-Serre
26144	26400	Grane
26145	26290	Les Granges-Gontardes
26379	26600	Granges-les-Beaumont
26146	26230	Grignan
26147	26470	Gumiane
26148	26390	Hauterives
26149	26730	Hostun
26150	26560	Izon-la-Bruisse
26381	26300	Jaillans
26152	26310	Jonchères
26153	26560	Laborel
26154	26560	Lachau
26155	26210	Lapeyrouse-Mornay
26156	26600	Larnage
26157	26740	La Laupie
26159	26150	Laval-d'Aix
26160	26240	Laveyron
26161	26510	Lemps
26162	26210	Lens-Lestang
26163	26190	Léoncel
26164	26310	Lesches-en-Diois
26165	26250	Livron-sur-Drôme
26166	26270	Loriol-sur-Drôme
26167	26310	Luc-en-Diois
26168	26620	Lus-la-Croix-Haute
26169	26780	Malataverne
26170	26120	Malissard
26171	26160	Manas
26172	26210	Manthes
26173	26300	Marches
26174	26260	Margès
26175	26150	Marignac-en-Diois
26176	26740	Marsanne
26177	26260	Marsaz
26178	26410	Menglon
26179	26600	Mercurol-Veaunes
26180	26170	Mérindol-les-Oliviers
26181	26560	Mévouillon
26182	26110	Mirabel-aux-Baronnies
26183	26400	Mirabel-et-Blacons
26185	26270	Mirmande
26186	26310	Miscon
26188	26170	Mollans-sur-Ouvèze
26189	26170	Montauban-sur-l'Ouvèze
26190	26110	Montaulieu
26191	26740	Montboucher-sur-Jabron
26192	26770	Montbrison-sur-Lez

INSEE code	Postal code	Commune
26193	26570	Montbrun-les-Bains
26194	26350	Montchenu
26195	26400	Montclar-sur-Gervanne
26196	26760	Montéléger
26197	26120	Montélier
26198	26200	Montélimar
26199	26510	Montferrand-la-Fare
26200	26560	Montfroc
26201	26170	Montguers
26202	26220	Montjoux
26203	26230	Montjoyer
26204	26310	Montlaur-en-Diois
26205	26150	Montmaur-en-Diois
26206	26120	Montmeyran
26207	26750	Montmiral
26208	26800	Montoison
26209	26510	Montréal-les-Sources
26211	26130	Montségur-sur-Lauzon
26212	26120	Montvendre
26213	26210	Moras-en-Valloire
26214	26460	Mornans
26215	26470	La Motte-Chalancon
26217	26190	La Motte-Fanjas
26218	26540	Mours-Saint-Eusèbe
26220	26110	Nyons
26221	26400	Omblèze
26222	26220	Orcinas
26223	26190	Oriol-en-Royans
26224	26120	Ourches
26225	26750	Parnans
26226	26770	Le Pègue
26227	26510	Pelonne
26228	26340	Pennes-le-Sec
26229	26170	La Penne-sur-l'Ouvèze
26231	26380	Peyrins
26232	26120	Peyrus
26233	26110	Piégon
26234	26400	Piégros-la-Clastre
26235	26700	Pierrelatte
26236	26170	Pierrelongue
26238	26110	Les Pilles
26239	26170	Plaisians
26240	26400	Plan-de-Baix
26241	26460	Le Poët-Célard
26242	26170	Le Poët-en-Percip
26243	26160	Le Poët-Laval
26244	26110	Le Poët-Sigillat
26245	26470	Pommerol
26246	26150	Ponet-et-Saint-Auban
26247	26240	Ponsas
26248	26150	Pontaix
26249	26160	Pont-de-Barret
26250	26600	Pont-de-l'Isère
26251	26160	Portes-en-Valdaine
26252	26800	Portes-lès-Valence
26253	26310	Poyols
26254	26340	Pradelle
26255	26310	Les Prés
26256	26170	Propiac
26257	26160	Puygiron
26258	26450	Puy-Saint-Martin
26259	26330	Ratières
26261	26230	Réauville
26262	26310	Recoubeau-Jansac
26263	26570	Reilhanette
26264	26510	Rémuzat
26020	26400	La Répara-Auriples
26266	26340	Rimon-et-Savel
26267	26170	Rioms
26268	26160	Rochebaudin
26269	26110	Rochebrune
26270	26190	Rochechinard
26271	26600	La Roche-de-Glun
26272	26160	Rochefort-en-Valdaine
26273	26300	Rochefort-Samson
26274	26340	Rochefourchat
26275	26790	Rochegude
26276	26770	Roche-Saint-Secret-Béconne
26277	26400	La Roche-sur-Grane
26278	26170	La Roche-sur-le-Buis
26279	26170	La Rochette-du-Buis
26281	26100	Romans-sur-Isère
26282	26150	Romeyer
26283	26470	Rottier
26284	26230	Roussas
26285	26770	Rousset-les-Vignes
26286	26510	Roussieux
26287	26450	Roynac
26288	26510	Sahune
26289	26340	Saillans
26290	26420	Saint-Agnan-en-Vercors
26291	26150	Saint-Andéol
26292	26170	Saint-Auban-sur-l'Ouvèze
26293	26330	Saint-Avit
26294	26260	Saint-Bardoux
26295	26240	Saint-Barthélemy-de-Vals
26296	26340	Saint-Benoit-en-Diois
26298	26350	Saint-Christophe-et-le-Laris
26300	26310	Saint-Dizier-en-Diois
26301	26260	Saint-Donat-sur-l'Herbasse
26299	26150	Sainte-Croix
26302	26190	Sainte-Eulalie-en-Royans
26303	26170	Sainte-Euphémie-sur-Ouvèze
26306	26110	Sainte-Jalle
26304	26110	Saint-Ferréol-Trente-Pas
26305	26160	Saint-Gervais-sur-Roubion
26216	26240	Saint-Jean-de-Galaure
26307	26190	Saint-Jean-en-Royans
26308	26150	Saint-Julien-en-Quint
26309	26420	Saint-Julien-en-Vercors
26310	26350	Saint-Laurent-d'Onay
26311	26190	Saint-Laurent-en-Royans
26312	26740	Saint-Marcel-lès-Sauzet
26313	26320	Saint-Marcel-lès-Valence
26314	26330	Saint-Martin-d'Août
26315	26420	Saint-Martin-en-Vercors
26316	26190	Saint-Martin-le-Colonel
26317	26110	Saint-Maurice-sur-Eygues
26318	26510	Saint-May
26319	26750	Saint-Michel-sur-Savasse
26320	26190	Saint-Nazaire-en-Royans
26321	26340	Saint-Nazaire-le-Désert
26322	26770	Saint-Pantaléon-les-Vignes
26323	26750	Saint-Paul-lès-Romans
26324	26130	Saint-Paul-Trois-Châteaux
26325	26140	Saint-Rambert-d'Albon
26326	26130	Saint-Restitut
26327	26410	Saint-Roman
26328	26340	Saint-Sauveur-en-Diois
26329	26110	Saint-Sauveur-Gouvernet
26330	26210	Saint-Sorlin-en-Valloire
26331	26190	Saint-Thomas-en-Royans
26332	26240	Saint-Uze
26333	26240	Saint-Vallier
26382	26300	Saint-Vincent-la-Commanderie
26334	26160	Salettes
26335	26770	Salles-sous-Bois
26336	26400	Saou
26337	26270	Saulce-sur-Rhône
26338	26740	Sauzet
26339	26740	Savasse
26340	26560	Séderon
26341	26600	Serves-sur-Rhône
26001	26150	Solaure-en-Diois
26342	26130	Solérieux
26343	26160	Souspierre
26344	26400	Soyans
26346	26400	Suze
26345	26790	Suze-la-Rousse
26347	26600	Tain-l'Hermitage
26348	26770	Taulignan
26349	26390	Tersanne
26350	26220	Teyssières
26351	26460	Les Tonils
26352	26160	La Touche
26353	26740	Les Tourrettes
26355	26750	Triors
26356	26460	Truinas
26357	26790	Tulette
26358	26120	Upie
26359	26150	Vachères-en-Quint
26360	26230	Valaurie
26361	26310	Valdrôme
26362	26000	Valence
26210	26350	Valherbasse
26136	26310	Val-Maravel
26363	26110	Valouse
26364	26420	Vassieux-en-Vercors
26365	26400	Vaunaveys-la-Rochette
26367	26110	Venterol
26368	26340	Vercheny
26369	26510	Verclause
26370	26170	Vercoiran
26372	26560	Vers-sur-Méouge
26373	26220	Vesc
26374	05700	Villebois-les-Pins
26375	26560	Villefranche-le-Château
26376	26510	Villeperdrix
26377	26110	Vinsobres
26378	26470	Volvent
