= Le Poët-Célard =

- Commune
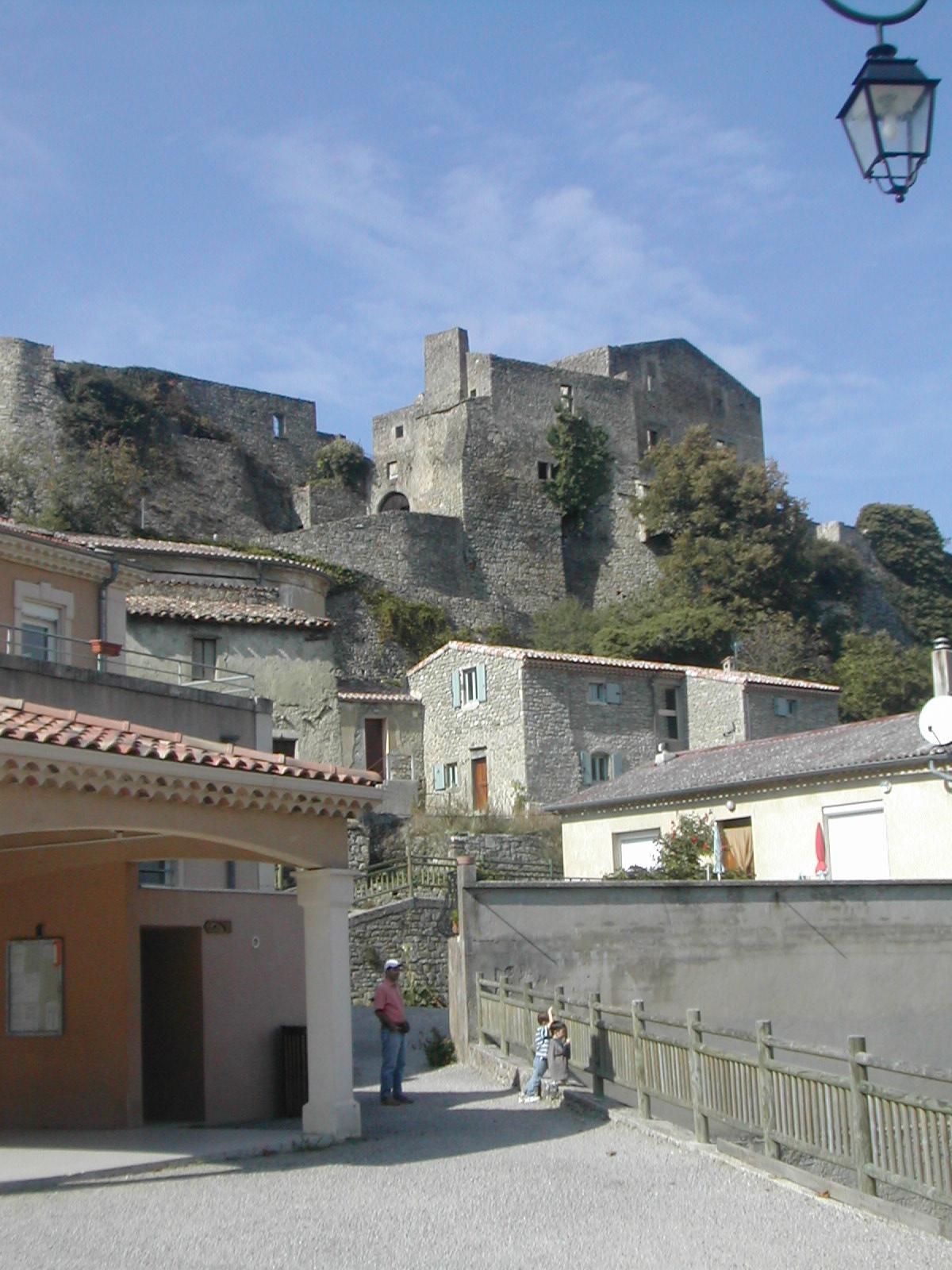
- A view of the château of Le Poët-Célard
- Location of Le Poët-Célard
- Location within France Location within Auvergne-Rhône-Alpes
- Coordinates: 44°36′10″N 5°06′16″E
- Country: France
- Region: Auvergne-Rhône-Alpes
- Department: Drôme
- Arrondissement: Die
- Canton: Dieulefit
- Intercommunality: Val de Drôme en Biovallée

Government
  - Mayor (2020–2026): Jean-Luc Bouchet
- Area^{1}: 8.34 km^{2} (3.22 sq mi)
- Highest elevation: 744 m (2,441 ft)
- Lowest elevation: 351 m (1,152 ft)
- Population (2023): 148
  - Density: 17.7/km^{2} (46.0/sq mi)
- Time zone: UTC+01:00 (CET)
  - Summer (DST): UTC+02:00 (CEST)
- INSEE/Postal code: 26241 /26460
- ^{1} French Land Register data, which excludes lakes, ponds, glaciers > 1 km^{2} (0.386 sq mi or 247 acres) and river estuaries.

Le Poët-Célard (Occitan: Lo Poèta-Célard) is a commune in the Drôme department in southeastern France.

== Population ==
Historical population
Year	Pop.	±% p.a.
1968	162	—
1975	150	−1.09%
1982	137	−1.29%
1990	142	+0.45%
1999	145	+0.23%
2007	143	−0.17%
2012	122	−3.13%
2017	127	+0.81%
2023	148	+2.58%
Source: INSEE

== See also ==
- Communes of the Drôme department
