= Francillon-sur-Roubion =

Francillon-sur-Roubion Francilhon (Occitan)
- Commune
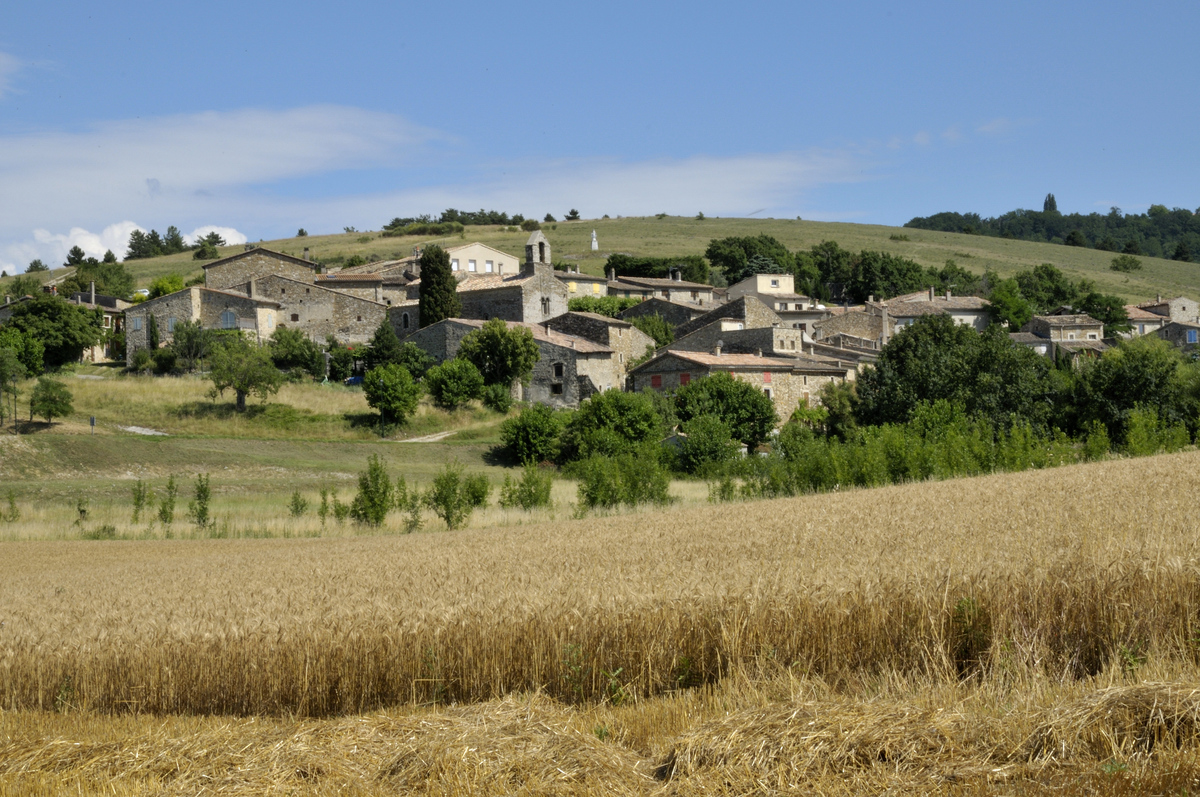
- A general view of Francillon-sur-Roubion
- Location of Francillon-sur-Roubion
- Location within France Location within Auvergne-Rhône-Alpes
- Coordinates: 44°37′29″N 5°05′14″E
- Country: France
- Region: Auvergne-Rhône-Alpes
- Department: Drôme
- Arrondissement: Die
- Canton: Dieulefit
- Intercommunality: CC du Val de Drôme en Biovallée

Government
  - Mayor (2020–2026): Jean-Michel Gaudet
- Area^{1}: 10.8 km^{2} (4.2 sq mi)
- Elevation: 462 m (1,516 ft)
- Highest elevation: 651 m (2,136 ft)
- Lowest elevation: 287 m (942 ft)
- Population (2023): 181
  - Density: 16.8/km^{2} (43.4/sq mi)
- Demonym: Francillonnais
- Time zone: UTC+01:00 (CET)
  - Summer (DST): UTC+02:00 (CEST)
- INSEE/Postal code: 26137 /26400
- ^{1} French Land Register data, which excludes lakes, ponds, glaciers > 1 km^{2} (0.386 sq mi or 247 acres) and river estuaries.

Francillon-sur-Roubion (French pronunciation: [fʁɑ̃sijɔ̃ syʁ ʁubjɔ̃]; Occitan: Francilhon) is a commune in the Drôme department in the Auvergne-Rhône-Alpes region in Southeastern France.

== Population ==
Historical population
Year	Pop.	±% p.a.
1968	119	—
1975	122	+0.36%
1982	133	+1.24%
1990	124	−0.87%
1999	140	+1.36%
2007	173	+2.68%
2012	180	+0.80%
2017	190	+1.09%
2023	181	−0.81%
Source: INSEE

== See also ==
- Communes of the Drôme department
