= Les Tonils =

- Commune
- Location of Les Tonils
- Location within France Location within Auvergne-Rhône-Alpes
- Coordinates: 44°34′57″N 5°11′59″E
- Country: France
- Region: Auvergne-Rhône-Alpes
- Department: Drôme
- Arrondissement: Nyons
- Canton: Dieulefit
- Intercommunality: Dieulefit-Bourdeaux

Government
  - Mayor (2020–2026): Jean-François Poisson
- Area^{1}: 13 km^{2} (5.0 sq mi)
- Elevation: 540 m (1,770 ft)
- Highest elevation: 1,513 m (4,964 ft)
- Lowest elevation: 497 m (1,631 ft)
- Population (2023): 16
  - Density: 1.2/km^{2} (3.2/sq mi)
- Time zone: UTC+01:00 (CET)
  - Summer (DST): UTC+02:00 (CEST)
- INSEE/Postal code: 26351 /26460
- ^{1} French Land Register data, which excludes lakes, ponds, glaciers > 1 km^{2} (0.386 sq mi or 247 acres) and river estuaries.

Les Tonils (French pronunciation: [le tɔnil]; Occitan: Los Tonils) is a commune in the Drôme department in the Auvergne-Rhône-Alpes region in southeastern France.

It was first inhabited in the year 1300.

== Population ==
Historical population
Year	Pop.	±% p.a.
1968	10	—
1975	14	+4.92%
1982	20	+5.23%
1990	20	+0.00%
1999	20	+0.00%
2007	18	−1.31%
2012	13	−6.30%
2017	25	+13.97%
2023	16	−7.17%
Source: INSEE

== Economy ==
The French goat's cheese Picodon is produced in and around Les Tonils.

== See also ==
- Communes of the Drôme department
