= Bouvières =

- Commune
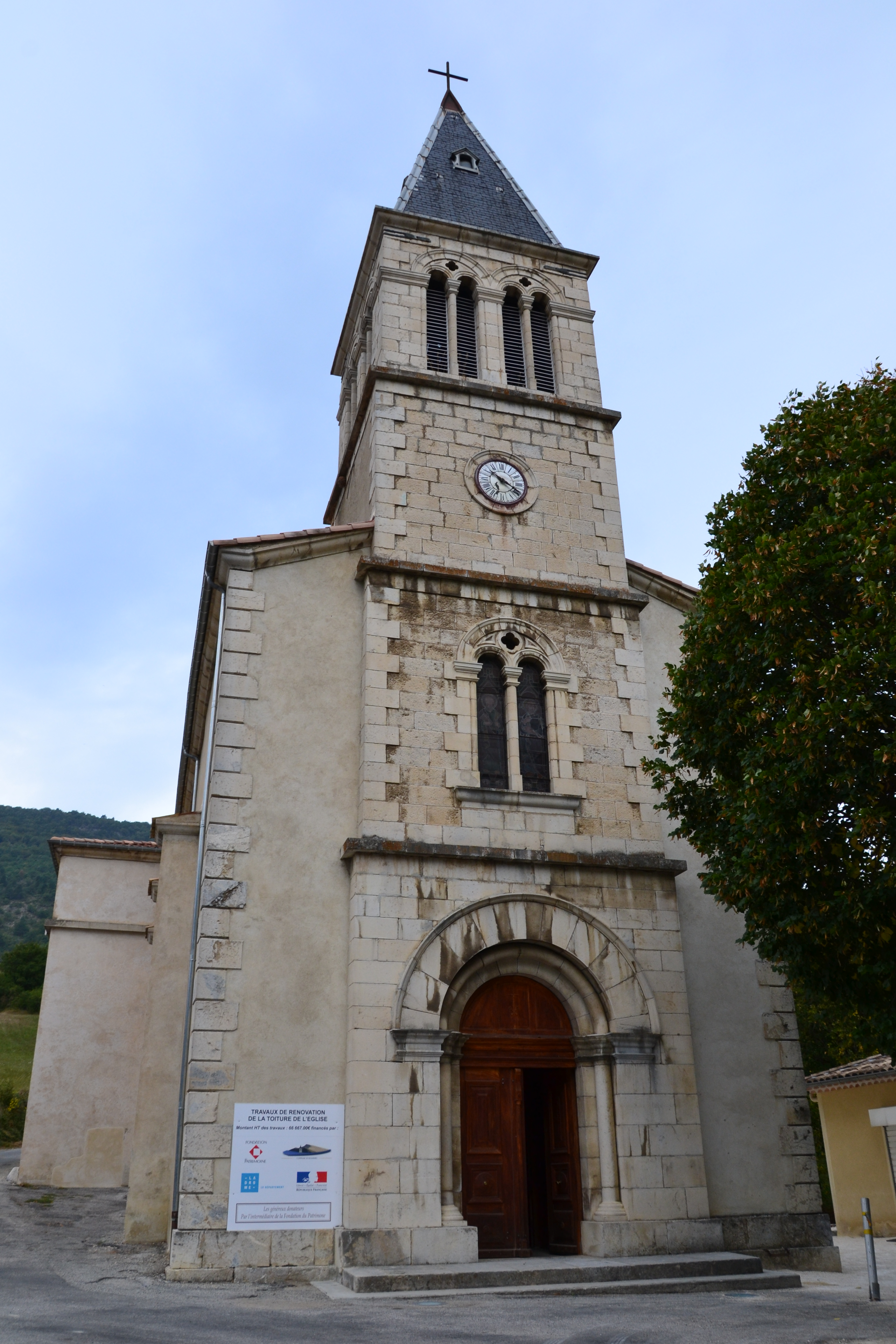
- The church in Bouvières
- Location of Bouvières
- Location within France Location within Auvergne-Rhône-Alpes
- Coordinates: 44°31′01″N 5°12′59″E
- Country: France
- Region: Auvergne-Rhône-Alpes
- Department: Drôme
- Arrondissement: Nyons
- Canton: Dieulefit
- Intercommunality: Dieulefit-Bourdeaux

Government
  - Mayor (2020–2026): Philippe Reynaud
- Area^{1}: 25.05 km^{2} (9.67 sq mi)
- Highest elevation: 1,577 m (5,174 ft)
- Lowest elevation: 540 m (1,770 ft)
- Population (2023): 151
  - Density: 6.03/km^{2} (15.6/sq mi)
- Time zone: UTC+01:00 (CET)
  - Summer (DST): UTC+02:00 (CEST)
- INSEE/Postal code: 26060 /26460
- ^{1} French Land Register data, which excludes lakes, ponds, glaciers > 1 km^{2} (0.386 sq mi or 247 acres) and river estuaries.

Bouvières (French pronunciation: [buvjɛʁ]; Occitan: Bovièras) is a commune in the Drôme department in southeastern France.

== Population ==
Historical population
Year	Pop.	±% p.a.
1968	196	—
1975	194	−0.15%
1982	181	−0.99%
1990	184	+0.21%
1999	160	−1.54%
2007	153	−0.56%
2012	143	−1.34%
2017	146	+0.42%
2023	151	+0.56%
Source: INSEE

== See also ==
- Communes of the Drôme department
