= Montjoux =

Montjoux Montjòus-la Palhita (Occitan)
- Commune
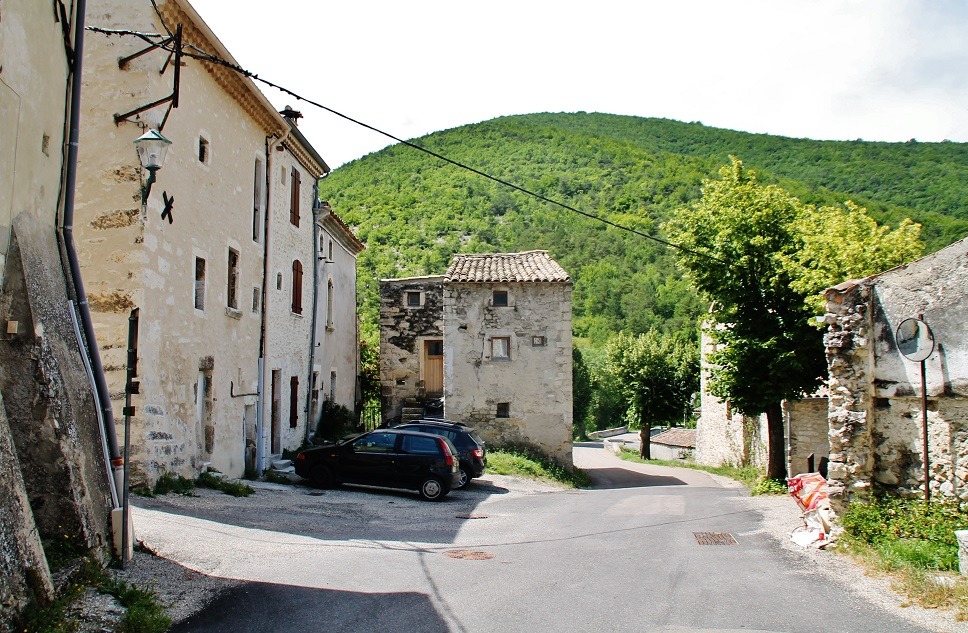
- The village of Montjoux
- Location of Montjoux
- Location within France Location within Auvergne-Rhône-Alpes
- Coordinates: 44°30′03″N 5°05′50″E
- Country: France
- Region: Auvergne-Rhône-Alpes
- Department: Drôme
- Arrondissement: Nyons
- Canton: Dieulefit
- Intercommunality: CC Dieulefit-Bourdeaux

Government
  - Mayor (2020–2026): Philippe Berrard
- Area^{1}: 18.35 km^{2} (7.08 sq mi)
- Highest elevation: 1,316 m (4,318 ft)
- Lowest elevation: 421 m (1,381 ft)
- Population (2023): 316
  - Density: 17.2/km^{2} (44.6/sq mi)
- Time zone: UTC+01:00 (CET)
  - Summer (DST): UTC+02:00 (CEST)
- INSEE/Postal code: 26202 /26220
- Website: montjoux-drome.fr
- ^{1} French Land Register data, which excludes lakes, ponds, glaciers > 1 km^{2} (0.386 sq mi or 247 acres) and river estuaries.

Montjoux (French pronunciation: [mɔ̃ʒu]; Occitan: Montjòus-la Palhita) is a commune in the Drôme department in Southeastern France.

== Population ==
Historical population
Year	Pop.	±% p.a.
1968	158	—
1975	172	+1.22%
1982	229	+4.17%
1990	252	+1.20%
1999	295	+1.77%
2007	312	+0.70%
2012	342	+1.85%
2017	332	−0.59%
2023	316	−0.82%
Source: INSEE

== See also ==
- Communes of the Drôme department
