= Rochebaudin =

- Commune
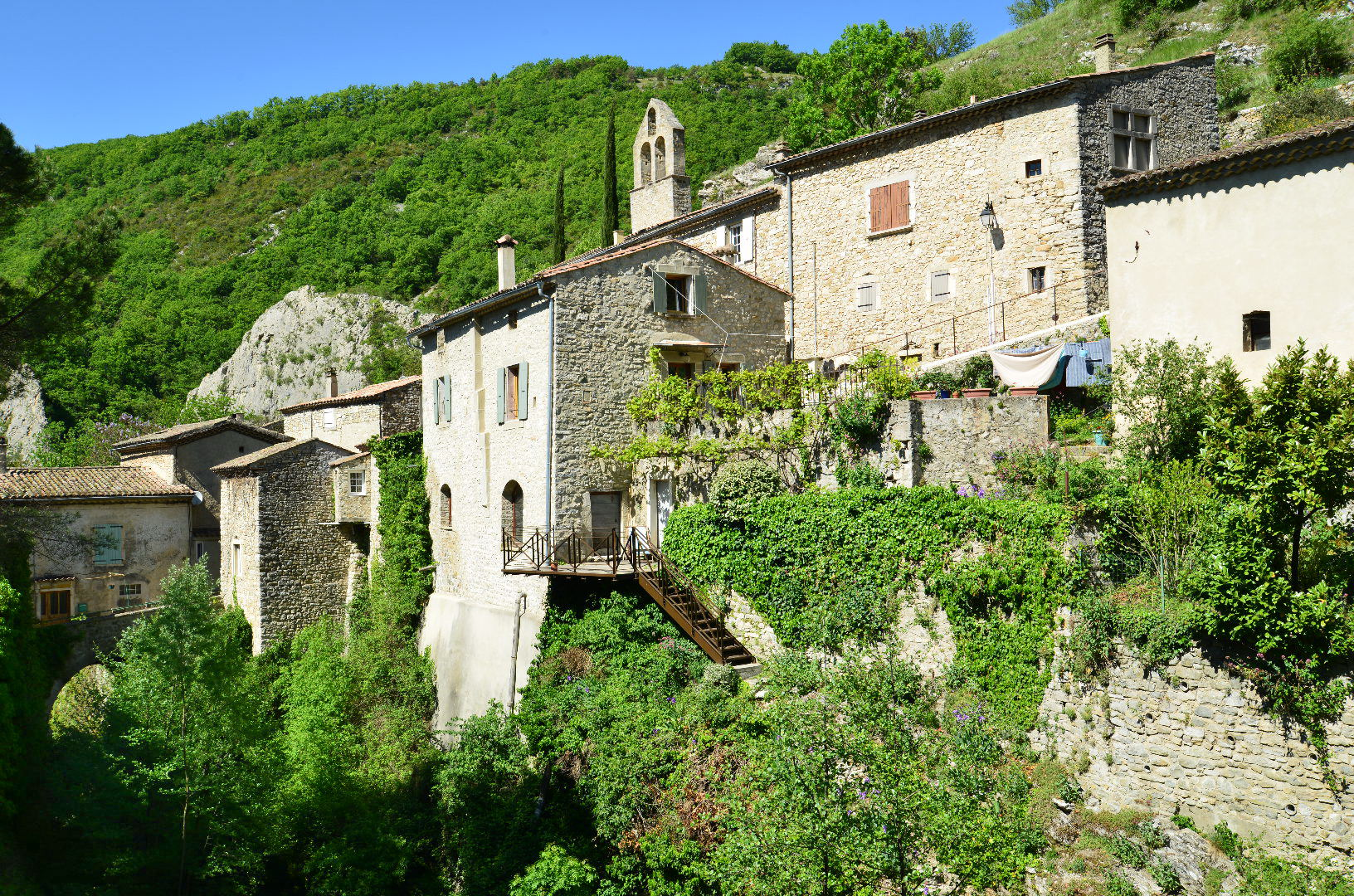
- The village of Rochebaudin
- Location of Rochebaudin
- Location within France Location within Auvergne-Rhône-Alpes
- Coordinates: 44°34′52″N 5°02′01″E
- Country: France
- Region: Auvergne-Rhône-Alpes
- Department: Drôme
- Arrondissement: Nyons
- Canton: Dieulefit

Government
  - Mayor (2020–2026): Stéphane Galdemas
- Area^{1}: 7.56 km^{2} (2.92 sq mi)
- Elevation: 315 m (1,033 ft)
- Highest elevation: 972 m (3,189 ft)
- Lowest elevation: 250 m (820 ft)
- Population (2023): 118
  - Density: 15.6/km^{2} (40.4/sq mi)
- Time zone: UTC+01:00 (CET)
  - Summer (DST): UTC+02:00 (CEST)
- INSEE/Postal code: 26268 /26160
- ^{1} French Land Register data, which excludes lakes, ponds, glaciers > 1 km^{2} (0.386 sq mi or 247 acres) and river estuaries.

Rochebaudin (French pronunciation: [ʁɔʃbodɛ̃]) is a commune in the Drôme department in southeastern France.

== Population ==
Historical population
Year	Pop.	±% p.a.
1968	106	—
1975	68	−6.14%
1982	74	+1.22%
1990	69	−0.87%
1999	111	+5.42%
2007	122	+1.19%
2012	121	−0.16%
2017	121	+0.00%
2023	118	−0.42%
Source: INSEE

== See also ==
- Communes of the Drôme department
