= Teyssières =

- Commune
- Location of Teyssières
- Location within France Location within Auvergne-Rhône-Alpes
- Coordinates: 44°27′43″N 5°08′46″E
- Country: France
- Region: Auvergne-Rhône-Alpes
- Department: Drôme
- Arrondissement: Nyons
- Canton: Dieulefit

Government
  - Mayor (2020–2026): Franck Mucke
- Area^{1}: 28.09 km^{2} (10.85 sq mi)
- Elevation: 782 m (2,566 ft)
- Highest elevation: 1,325 m (4,347 ft)
- Lowest elevation: 498 m (1,634 ft)
- Population (2023): 66
  - Density: 2.3/km^{2} (6.1/sq mi)
- Time zone: UTC+01:00 (CET)
  - Summer (DST): UTC+02:00 (CEST)
- INSEE/Postal code: 26350 /26220
- ^{1} French Land Register data, which excludes lakes, ponds, glaciers > 1 km^{2} (0.386 sq mi or 247 acres) and river estuaries.

Teyssières (French pronunciation: [tɛsjɛʁ]) is a commune in the Drôme department in southeastern France.

== Population ==
Historical population
Year	Pop.	±% p.a.
1968	77	—
1975	71	−1.15%
1982	58	−2.85%
1990	69	+2.19%
1999	64	−0.83%
2007	89	+4.21%
2012	81	−1.87%
2017	88	+1.67%
2023	66	−4.68%
Source: INSEE

== See also ==
- Communes of the Drôme department
