= Le Poët-Laval =

- Commune
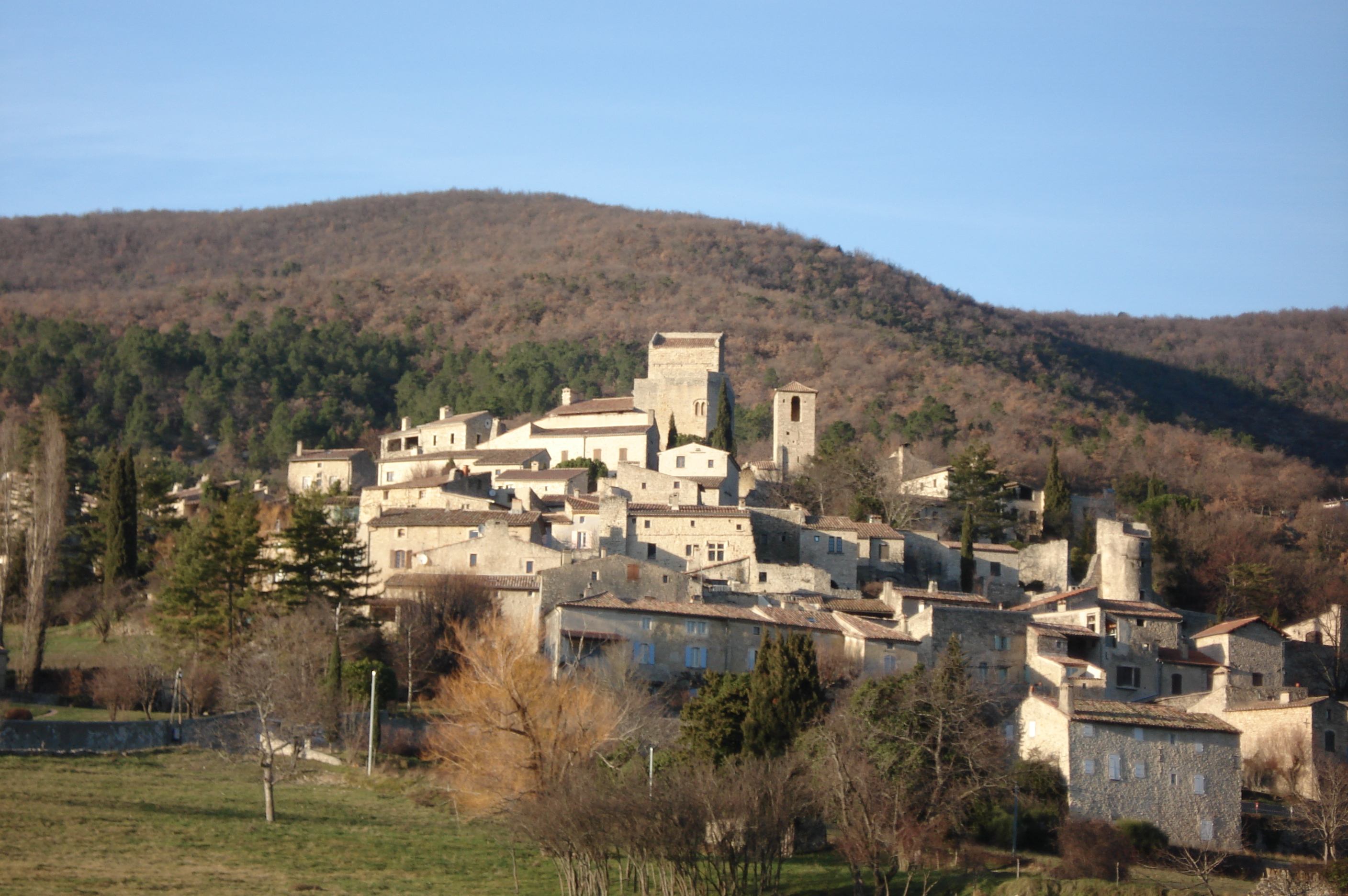
- A general view of Le Poët-Laval's "vieux village"(old village)
- Location of Le Poët-Laval
- Location within France Location within Auvergne-Rhône-Alpes
- Coordinates: 44°31′51″N 5°00′59″E
- Country: France
- Region: Auvergne-Rhône-Alpes
- Department: Drôme
- Arrondissement: Nyons
- Canton: Dieulefit

Government
  - Mayor (2022–2026): Patrice Magnan
- Area^{1}: 31.22 km^{2} (12.05 sq mi)
- Highest elevation: 973 m (3,192 ft)
- Lowest elevation: 255 m (837 ft)
- Population (2023): 954
  - Density: 30.6/km^{2} (79.1/sq mi)
- Time zone: UTC+01:00 (CET)
  - Summer (DST): UTC+02:00 (CEST)
- INSEE/Postal code: 26243 /26160
- ^{1} French Land Register data, which excludes lakes, ponds, glaciers > 1 km^{2} (0.386 sq mi or 247 acres) and river estuaries.

Le Poët-Laval (Occitan: Lo Poèta-Laval) is a rural commune in the Drôme department of the Auvergne-Rhône-Alpes region of southeastern France. It is a member of Les Plus Beaux Villages de France (The Most Beautiful Villages of France) Association.

== Population ==
Historical population
Year	Pop.	±% p.a.
1968	505	—
1975	493	−0.34%
1982	538	+1.26%
1990	652	+2.43%
1999	809	+2.43%
2007	884	+1.11%
2012	933	+1.08%
2017	933	+0.00%
2023	954	+0.37%
Source: INSEE

== See also ==
- Communes of the Drôme department
