= Dieulefit =

Dieulefit Dieulofet (Occitan)
- Commune
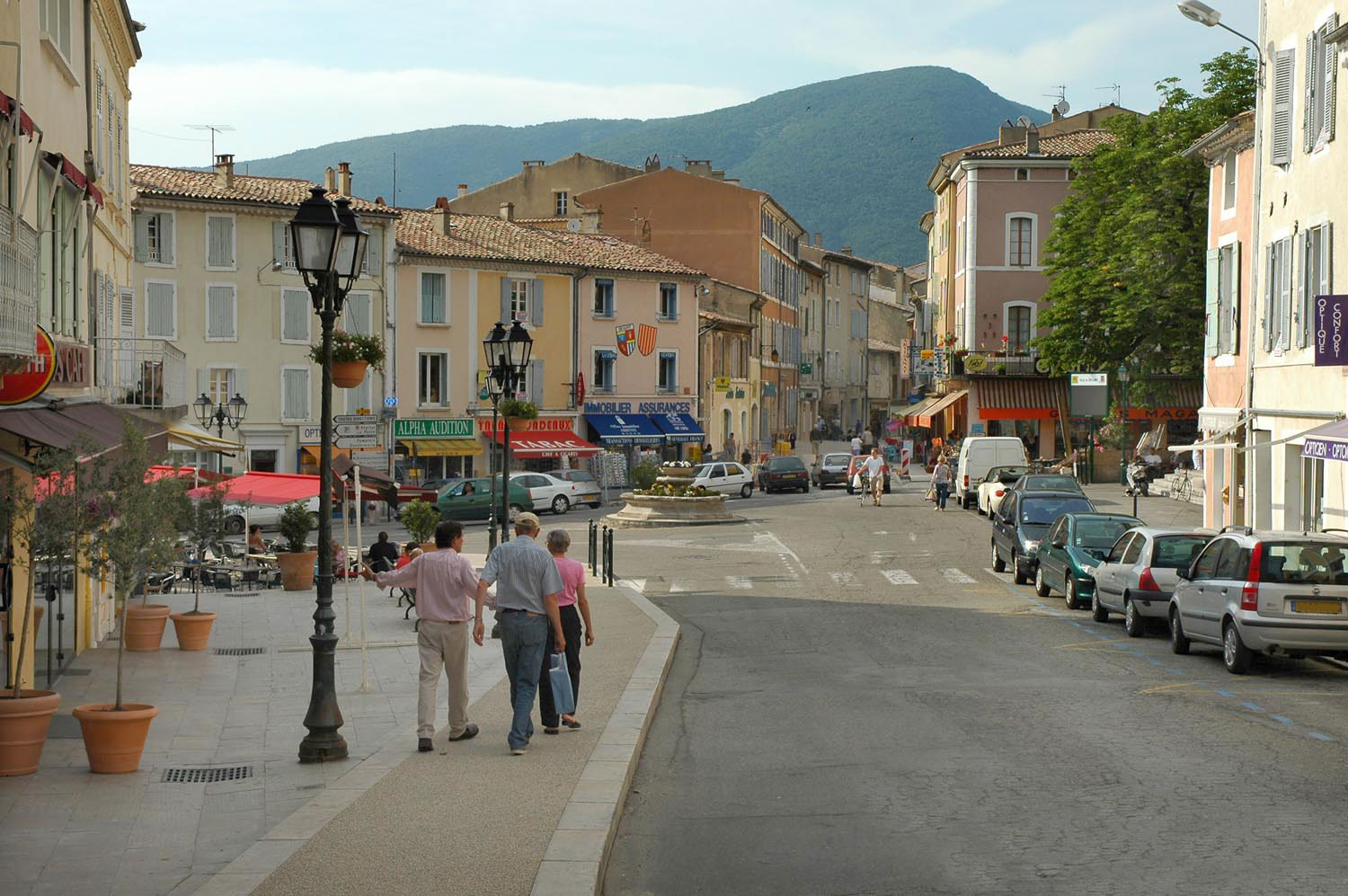
- The town centre of Dieulefit

- Coat of arms
- Location of Dieulefit
- Location within France Location within Auvergne-Rhône-Alpes
- Coordinates: 44°31′27″N 5°03′59″E
- Country: France
- Region: Auvergne-Rhône-Alpes
- Department: Drôme
- Arrondissement: Nyons
- Canton: Dieulefit
- Intercommunality: CC Dieulefit-Bourdeaux

Government
  - Mayor (2020–2026): Christian Bussat
- Area^{1}: 27.42 km^{2} (10.59 sq mi)
- Highest elevation: 969 m (3,179 ft)
- Lowest elevation: 323 m (1,060 ft)
- Population (2023): 3,289
  - Density: 119.9/km^{2} (310.7/sq mi)
- Demonym: Dieulefitois
- Time zone: UTC+01:00 (CET)
  - Summer (DST): UTC+02:00 (CEST)
- INSEE/Postal code: 26114 /26220
- Website: mairie-dieulefit.fr
- ^{1} French Land Register data, which excludes lakes, ponds, glaciers > 1 km^{2} (0.386 sq mi or 247 acres) and river estuaries.

Dieulefit (French pronunciation: [djøl(ə)fi]; Occitan: Dieulofet, from the Old Occitan Dieu lo fe for "God made it") is a commune in the Drôme department in southeastern France.

== History ==
The origin of Dieulefit's name is debated. Some sources suggest it refers to the village as divinely created, while others interpret it as referencing a resting place for Crusaders or the authority of the local lord.

Dieulefit has a long tradition of providing refuge. In 1939 and during World War II, the village welcomed Spanish Republicans, Jews, and other persecuted people, earning the nickname "miracle of Dieulefit" for the safety and solidarity offered to refugees. Nine of Dieulefit's inhabitants were named righteous among the nations.

== Population ==
Historical population

| Year | Pop. | ±% p.a. |
|---|---|---|
| 1793 | 2,663 | — |
| 1800 | 2,847 | +0.96% |
| 1806 | 2,989 | +0.81% |
| 1821 | 3,374 | +0.81% |
| 1831 | 3,952 | +1.59% |
| 1836 | 4,135 | +0.91% |
| 1841 | 4,163 | +0.14% |
| 1846 | 4,291 | +0.61% |
| 1851 | 4,222 | −0.32% |
| 1856 | 4,010 | −1.03% |
| 1861 | 4,205 | +0.95% |
| 1866 | 4,147 | −0.28% |
| 1872 | 4,028 | −0.48% |
| 1876 | 4,049 | +0.13% |
| 1881 | 4,167 | +0.58% |
| 1886 | 4,280 | +0.54% |
| 1891 | 3,546 | −3.69% |
| 1896 | 3,544 | −0.01% |
| 1901 | 3,545 | +0.01% |

| Year | Pop. | ±% p.a. |
|---|---|---|
| 1906 | 3,621 | +0.43% |
| 1911 | 3,604 | −0.09% |
| 1921 | 3,073 | −1.58% |
| 1926 | 2,591 | −3.35% |
| 1931 | 2,539 | −0.40% |
| 1936 | 2,404 | −1.09% |
| 1946 | 2,436 | +0.13% |
| 1954 | 2,704 | +1.31% |
| 1962 | 2,450 | −1.23% |
| 1968 | 2,534 | +0.56% |
| 1975 | 2,632 | +0.54% |
| 1982 | 2,666 | +0.18% |
| 1990 | 2,924 | +1.16% |
| 1999 | 3,096 | +0.64% |
| 2007 | 3,148 | +0.21% |
| 2012 | 3,030 | −0.76% |
| 2017 | 3,159 | +0.84% |
| 2023 | 3,289 | +0.67% |

Source: EHESS and INSEE (1968–2023)

== See also ==
- Communes of the Drôme department
