= Comps, Drôme =

Comps
- Commune
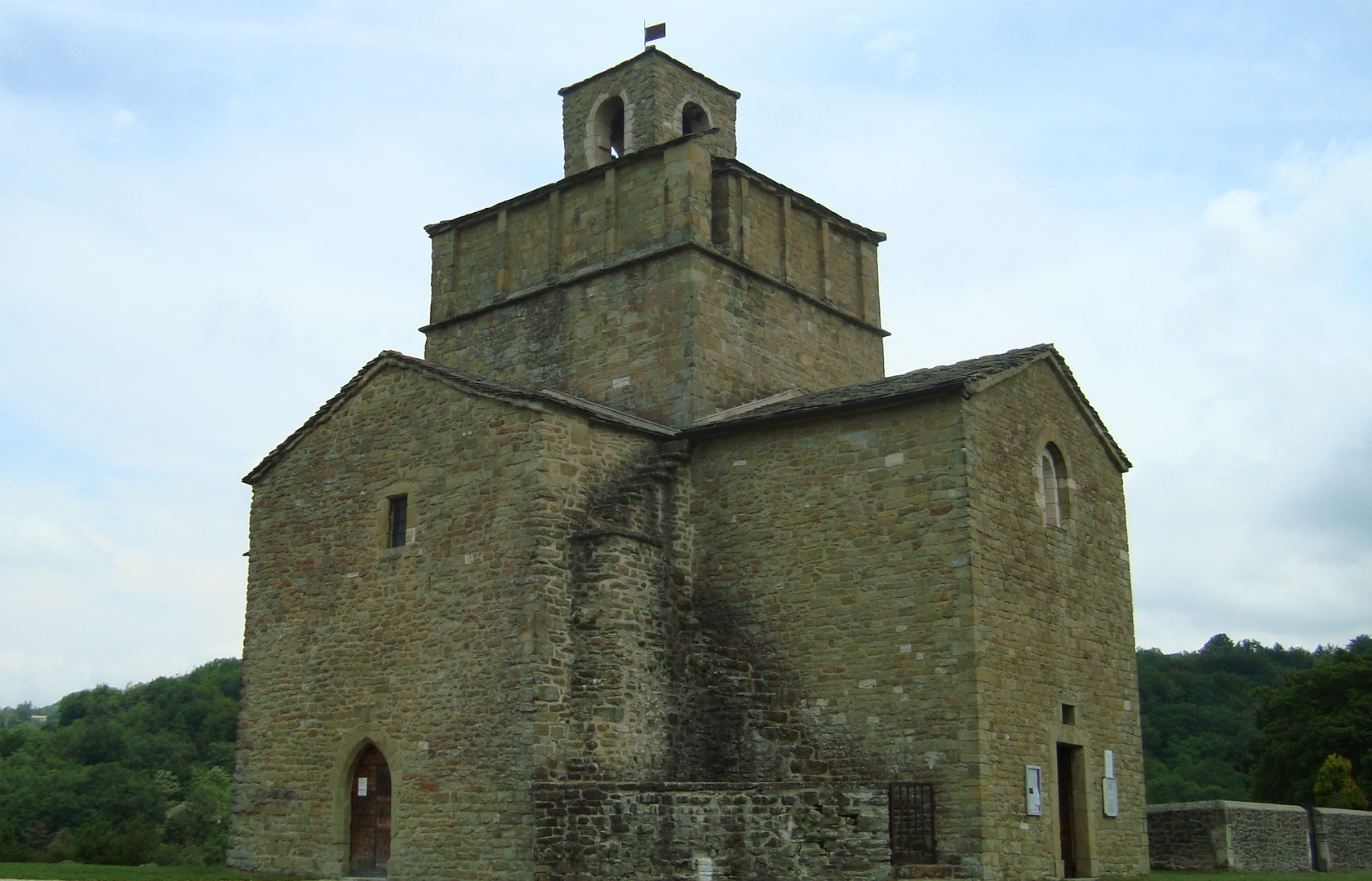
- The church of Saint-Pierre and Saint-Paul, in Comps

- Coat of arms
- Location of Comps
- Location within France Location within Auvergne-Rhône-Alpes
- Coordinates: 44°33′12″N 5°06′47″E
- Country: France
- Region: Auvergne-Rhône-Alpes
- Department: Drôme
- Arrondissement: Nyons
- Canton: Dieulefit

Government
  - Mayor (2020–2026): Jean-Pierre Fabre
- Area^{1}: 11.88 km^{2} (4.59 sq mi)
- Highest elevation: 959 m (3,146 ft)
- Lowest elevation: 465 m (1,526 ft)
- Population (2023): 137
  - Density: 11.5/km^{2} (29.9/sq mi)
- Time zone: UTC+01:00 (CET)
  - Summer (DST): UTC+02:00 (CEST)
- INSEE/Postal code: 26101 /26220
- ^{1} French Land Register data, which excludes lakes, ponds, glaciers > 1 km^{2} (0.386 sq mi or 247 acres) and river estuaries.

Comps is a commune in the Drôme department in southeastern France.

== Population ==
Historical population
Year	Pop.	±% p.a.
1968	119	—
1975	104	−1.91%
1982	129	+3.13%
1990	137	+0.75%
1999	118	−1.65%
2007	158	+3.72%
2012	164	+0.75%
2017	156	−1.00%
2023	137	−2.14%
Source: INSEE

== See also ==
- Communes of the Drôme department
