= La Bégude-de-Mazenc =

- Commune
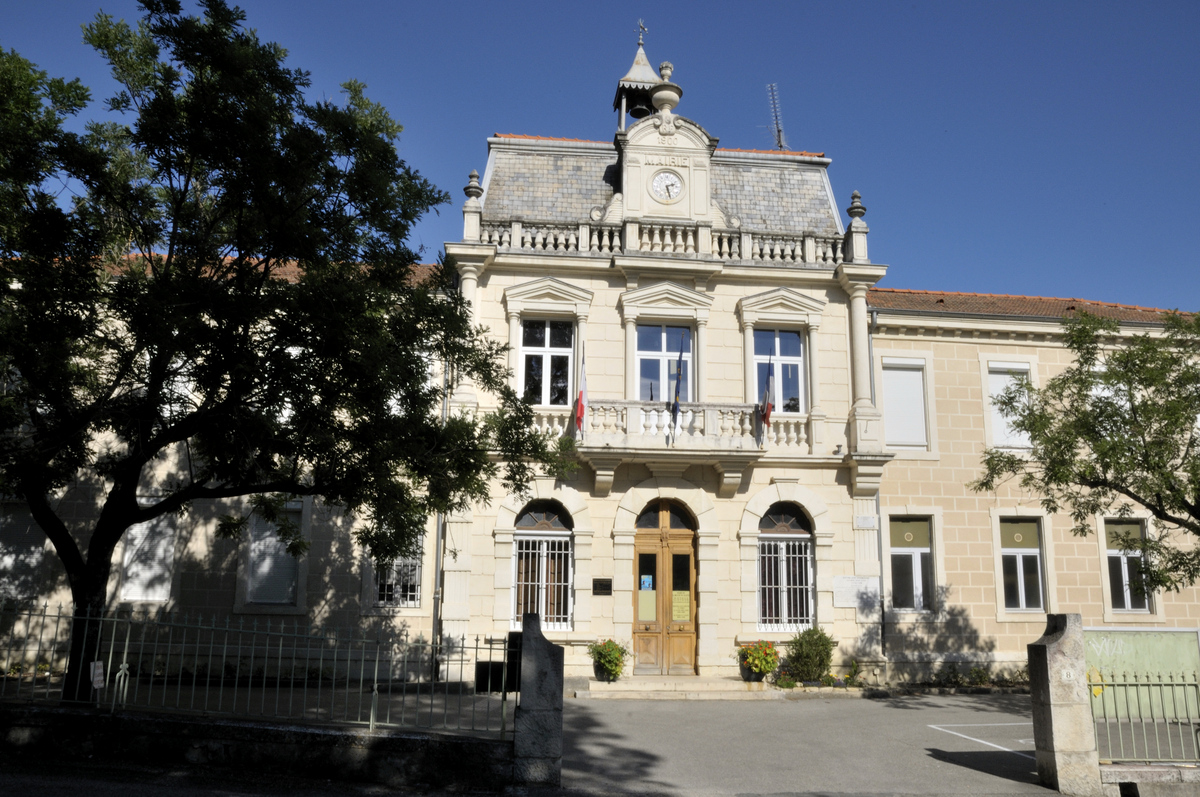
- Town hall
- Location of La Bégude-de-Mazenc
- Location within France Location within Auvergne-Rhône-Alpes
- Coordinates: 44°32′42″N 4°56′11″E
- Country: France
- Region: Auvergne-Rhône-Alpes
- Department: Drôme
- Arrondissement: Nyons
- Canton: Dieulefit

Government
  - Mayor (2020–2026): Marc-André Barbe
- Area^{1}: 23.62 km^{2} (9.12 sq mi)
- Highest elevation: 481 m (1,578 ft)
- Lowest elevation: 158 m (518 ft)
- Population (2023): 1,779
  - Density: 75.32/km^{2} (195.1/sq mi)
- Time zone: UTC+01:00 (CET)
  - Summer (DST): UTC+02:00 (CEST)
- INSEE/Postal code: 26045 /26160
- ^{1} French Land Register data, which excludes lakes, ponds, glaciers > 1 km^{2} (0.386 sq mi or 247 acres) and river estuaries.

La Bégude-de-Mazenc is a commune in the Drôme department in southeastern France.

== Population ==
Historical population
Year	Pop.	±% p.a.
1968	980	—
1975	904	−1.15%
1982	1,021	+1.75%
1990	1,053	+0.39%
1999	1,205	+1.51%
2007	1,421	+2.08%
2012	1,589	+2.26%
2017	1,656	+0.83%
2023	1,779	+1.20%
Source: INSEE

== See also ==
- Communes of the Drôme department
