= Bourdeaux =

- Commune
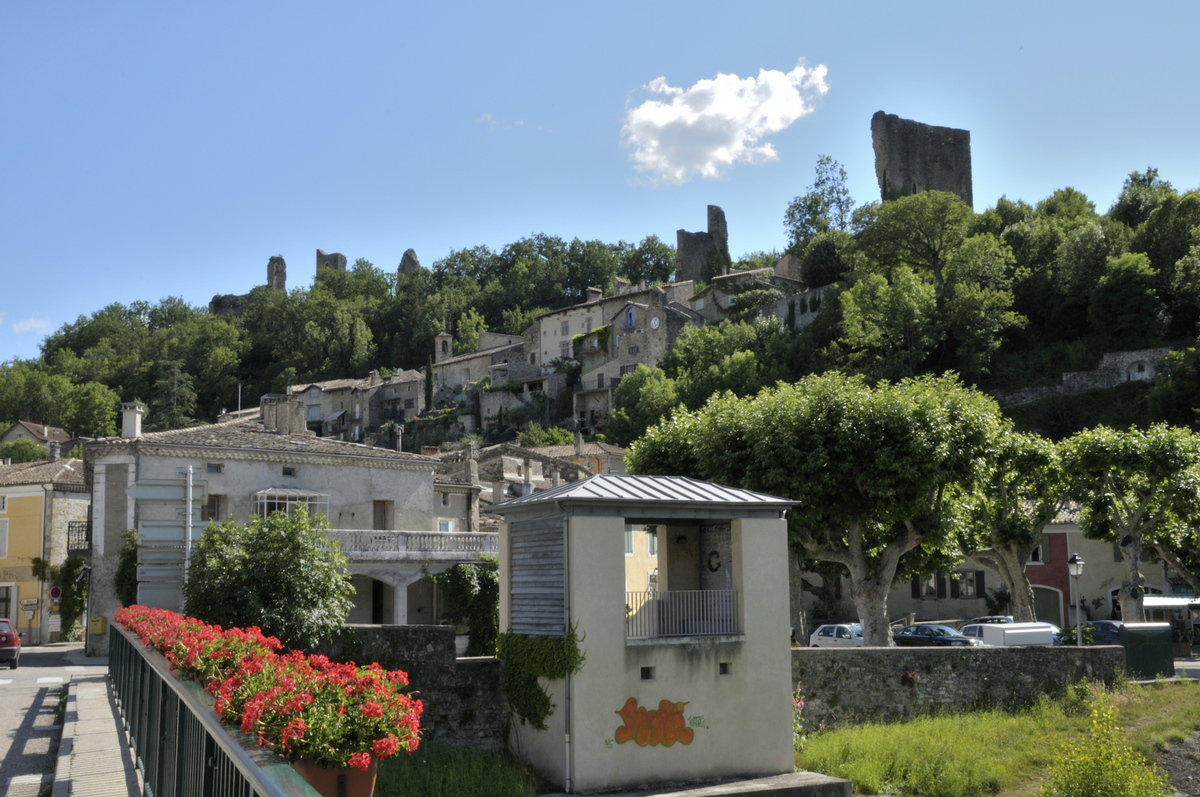
- The old village

- Coat of arms
- Location of Bourdeaux
- Location within France Location within Auvergne-Rhône-Alpes
- Coordinates: 44°35′14″N 5°08′07″E
- Country: France
- Region: Auvergne-Rhône-Alpes
- Department: Drôme
- Arrondissement: Nyons
- Canton: Dieulefit
- Intercommunality: Dieulefit-Bourdeaux

Government
  - Mayor (2020–2026): Thierry Didier
- Area^{1}: 23.11 km^{2} (8.92 sq mi)
- Elevation: 407 m (1,335 ft)
- Highest elevation: 1,410 m (4,630 ft)
- Lowest elevation: 377 m (1,237 ft)
- Population (2023): 670
  - Density: 29/km^{2} (75/sq mi)
- Time zone: UTC+01:00 (CET)
  - Summer (DST): UTC+02:00 (CEST)
- INSEE/Postal code: 26056 /26460
- ^{1} French Land Register data, which excludes lakes, ponds, glaciers > 1 km^{2} (0.386 sq mi or 247 acres) and river estuaries.

Bourdeaux (French pronunciation: [buʁdo]; Occitan: Bordèus) is a commune in the Drôme department in southeastern France.

== Population ==
Historical population
Year	Pop.	±% p.a.
1968	550	—
1975	536	−0.37%
1982	578	+1.08%
1990	562	−0.35%
1999	563	+0.02%
2007	611	+1.03%
2012	616	+0.16%
2017	653	+1.17%
2023	670	+0.43%
Source: INSEE

== See also ==
- Communes of the Drôme department
