= Eyzahut =

- Commune
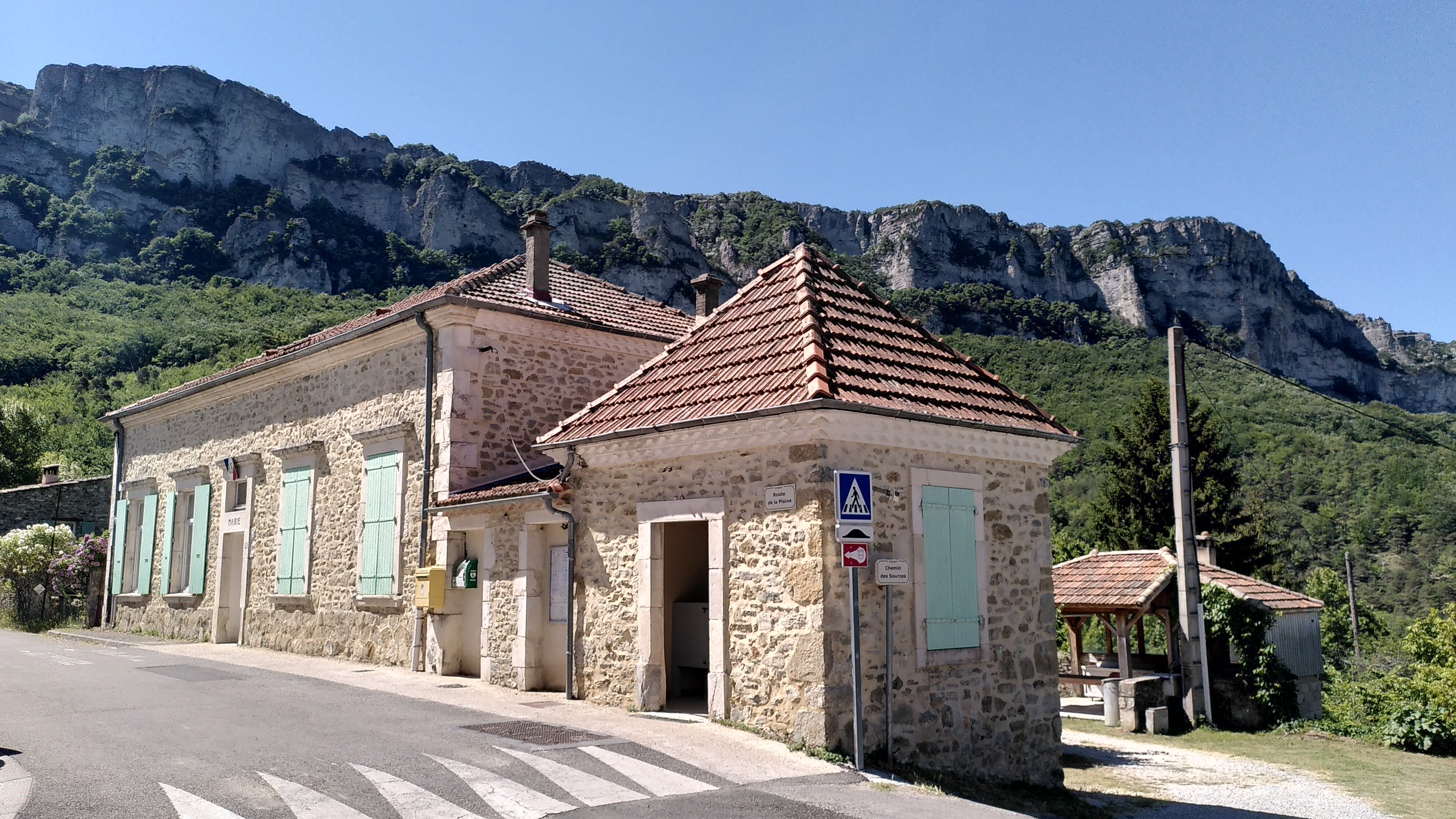
- Town hall of Eyzahut
- Location of Eyzahut
- Location within France Location within Auvergne-Rhône-Alpes
- Coordinates: 44°33′57″N 5°00′45″E
- Country: France
- Region: Auvergne-Rhône-Alpes
- Department: Drôme
- Arrondissement: Nyons
- Canton: Dieulefit

Government
  - Mayor (2020–2026): Fabienne Simian
- Area^{1}: 6.66 km^{2} (2.57 sq mi)
- Highest elevation: 872 m (2,861 ft)
- Lowest elevation: 285 m (935 ft)
- Population (2023): 151
  - Density: 22.7/km^{2} (58.7/sq mi)
- Time zone: UTC+01:00 (CET)
  - Summer (DST): UTC+02:00 (CEST)
- INSEE/Postal code: 26131 /26160
- Website: http://www.eyzahut.fr/
- ^{1} French Land Register data, which excludes lakes, ponds, glaciers > 1 km^{2} (0.386 sq mi or 247 acres) and river estuaries.

Eyzahut (French pronunciation: [eza.y]) is a commune in the Drôme department in the Auvergne-Rhône-Alpes region in southeastern France. It is a rather touristic spot of the area in the summer, thanks to the natural scenery surrounding it and infrastructures built in the 1970s (public swimming pool, tennis court).

== Population ==
Historical population
Year	Pop.	±% p.a.
1968	52	—
1975	47	−1.43%
1982	78	+7.50%
1990	86	+1.23%
1999	111	+2.88%
2007	127	+1.70%
2012	134	+1.08%
2017	147	+1.87%
2023	151	+0.45%
Source: INSEE

== See also ==
- Communes of the Drôme department
