= Salettes, Drôme =

Salettes
- Commune
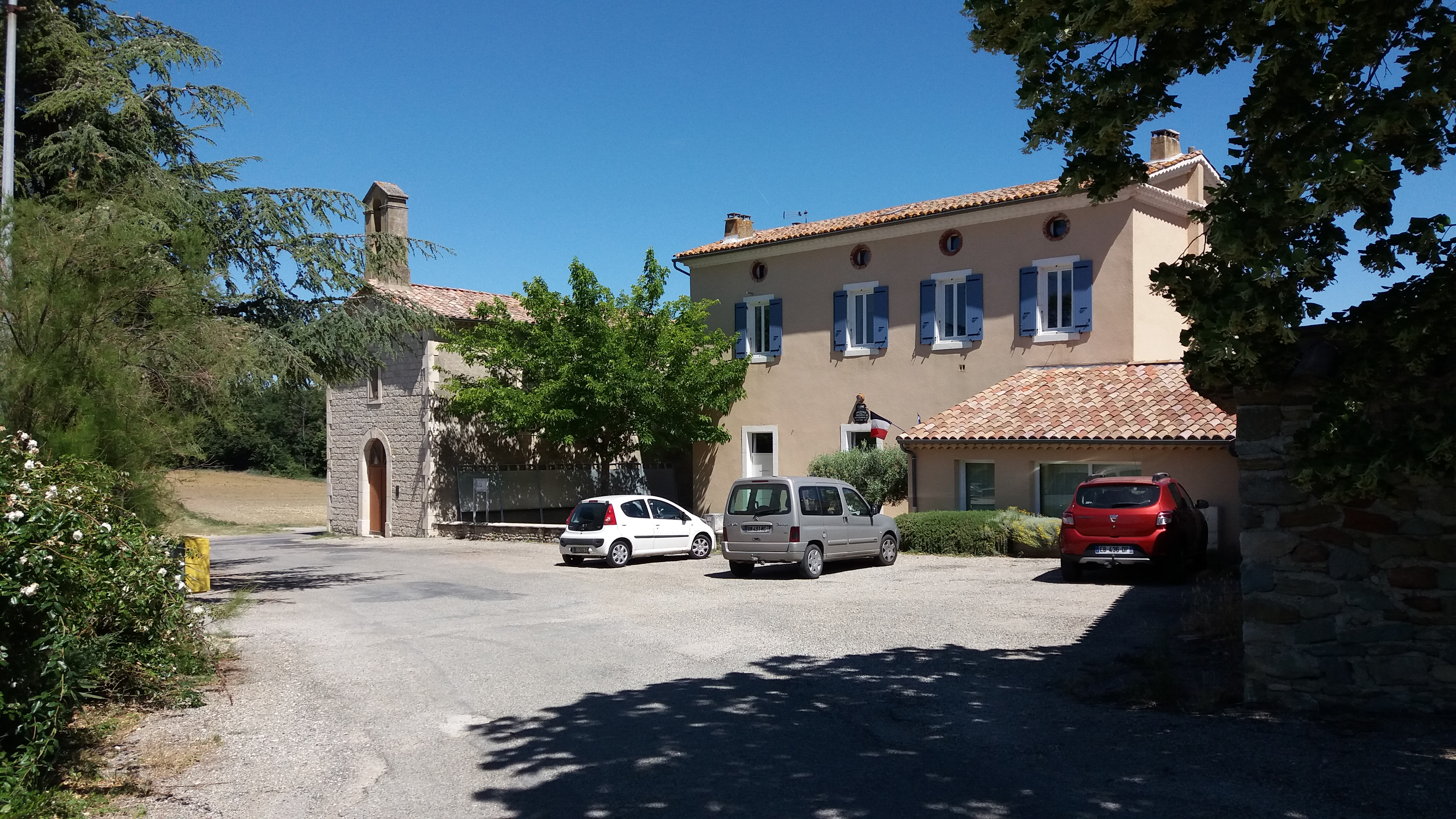
- Salettes Town hall
- Location of Salettes
- Location within France Location within Auvergne-Rhône-Alpes
- Coordinates: 44°34′01″N 4°58′01″E
- Country: France
- Region: Auvergne-Rhône-Alpes
- Department: Drôme
- Arrondissement: Nyons
- Canton: Dieulefit

Government
  - Mayor (2020–2026): Jean-Pierre Leydier
- Area^{1}: 6.98 km^{2} (2.69 sq mi)
- Elevation: 245 m (804 ft)
- Highest elevation: 664 m (2,178 ft)
- Lowest elevation: 207 m (679 ft)
- Population (2023): 148
  - Density: 21.2/km^{2} (54.9/sq mi)
- Time zone: UTC+01:00 (CET)
  - Summer (DST): UTC+02:00 (CEST)
- INSEE/Postal code: 26334 /26160
- ^{1} French Land Register data, which excludes lakes, ponds, glaciers > 1 km^{2} (0.386 sq mi or 247 acres) and river estuaries.

Salettes (French pronunciation: [salɛt]) is a commune in the Drôme department in southeastern France.

== Population ==
Historical population
Year	Pop.	±% p.a.
1968	77	—
1975	71	−1.15%
1982	88	+3.11%
1990	82	−0.88%
1999	94	+1.53%
2007	123	+3.42%
2012	133	+1.58%
2017	145	+1.74%
2023	148	+0.34%
Source: INSEE

== See also ==
- Communes of the Drôme department
