= Canton of Dieulefit =

Coordinates: 44.52°N 5.07°E

The canton of Dieulefit is an administrative division of the Drôme department, southeastern France. Its borders were modified at the French canton reorganisation which came into effect in March 2015. Its seat is in Dieulefit.

It consists of the following communes:

1. Aleyrac
2. La Bâtie-Rolland
3. La Bégude-de-Mazenc
4. Bézaudun-sur-Bîne
5. Bonlieu-sur-Roubion
6. Bourdeaux
7. Bouvières
8. Charols
9. Cléon-d'Andran
10. Comps
11. Condillac
12. Crupies
13. Dieulefit
14. Eyzahut
15. Félines-sur-Rimandoule
16. Francillon-sur-Roubion
17. La Laupie
18. Manas
19. Marsanne
20. Montjoux
21. Mornans
22. Orcinas
23. Le Poët-Célard
24. Le Poët-Laval
25. Pont-de-Barret
26. Portes-en-Valdaine
27. Puygiron
28. Puy-Saint-Martin
29. Rochebaudin
30. Rochefort-en-Valdaine
31. Roche-Saint-Secret-Béconne
32. Roynac
33. Saint-Gervais-sur-Roubion
34. Saint-Marcel-lès-Sauzet
35. Salettes
36. Saou
37. Sauzet
38. Souspierre
39. Soyans
40. Teyssières
41. Les Tonils
42. La Touche
43. Truinas
44. Vesc
