= Bourg-de-Péage =

- Commune
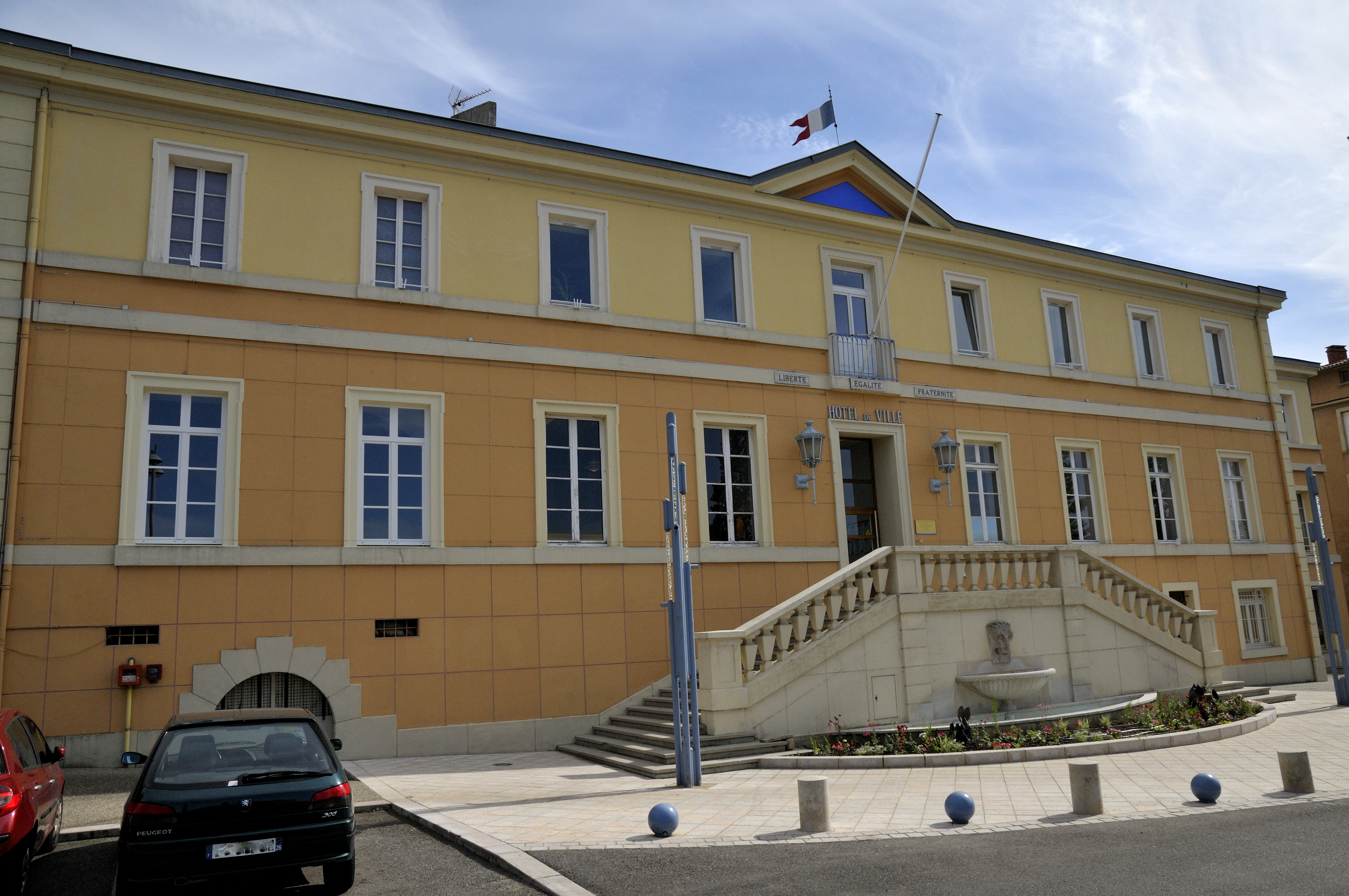
- Bourg-de-Péage Town Hall

- Coat of arms
- Location of Bourg-de-Péage
- Location within France Location within Auvergne-Rhône-Alpes
- Coordinates: 45°02′19″N 5°03′03″E
- Country: France
- Region: Auvergne-Rhône-Alpes
- Department: Drôme
- Arrondissement: Valence
- Canton: Bourg-de-Péage
- Intercommunality: CA Valence Romans Agglo

Government
  - Mayor (2020–2026): Nathalie Nieson
- Area^{1}: 13.71 km^{2} (5.29 sq mi)
- Elevation: 135 m (443 ft)
- Highest elevation: 200 m (660 ft)
- Lowest elevation: 155 m (509 ft)
- Population (2023): 9,921
  - Density: 723.6/km^{2} (1,874/sq mi)
- Time zone: UTC+01:00 (CET)
  - Summer (DST): UTC+02:00 (CEST)
- INSEE/Postal code: 26057 /26300
- ^{1} French Land Register data, which excludes lakes, ponds, glaciers > 1 km^{2} (0.386 sq mi or 247 acres) and river estuaries.

Bourg-de-Péage (French pronunciation: [buʁ də peaʒ]; Vivaro-Alpine dialect of Occitan: Lo Borg dau Peatge, [lu buɾk ˈdaw peˈad͡ʒe]; Catalan: Lo Peatge de Pisançon) often known as Péage is a commune in the Drôme department in the region of Auvergne-Rhône-Alpes, France.

== Geography ==
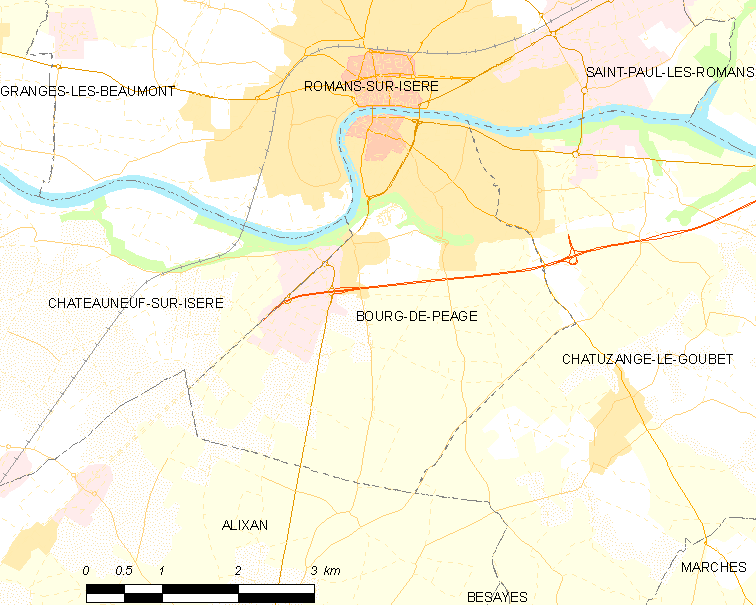
Map of communes neighbouring Bourg-de-Péage

Bourg-de-Péage is located 20 kilometres (12 mi) from Valence, prefecture of Drôme, 82 kilometres (51 mi) away from Lyon, 195 kilometres (121 mi) from Marseille and 473 kilometres (294 mi) from Paris.

=== Communes and neighboring towns ===
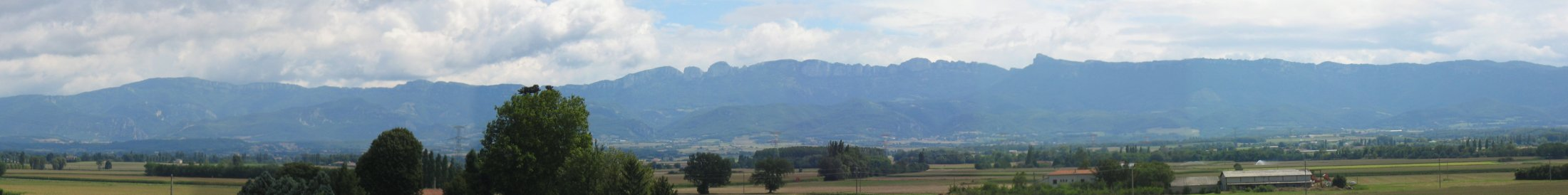
The Monts du Matin

=== Hydrography ===
Bourg-de-Péage is separated from its sister town of Romans-sur-Isère by the Isère River.

== History ==
The development of the town was due to the presence of a bridge, across the Isère, built by the monks of the Abbey Saint Bernard of Vienne, in 1033. They perceived a right of passage of this bridge. If the inhabitants of the jurisdiction of the current canton were exempt, with the exception of the days of major fairs, foreigners were however taxed at a premium. Similarly, the Isère boatmen had to pay a tribute for their oars. This activity didn't slow the settlement of the habitat, and the hamlet of Pizançon (commune of Chatuzange-le-Goubet), which originally stood at the end of the bridge, saw its population grow rapidly.

Since the Middle Ages, the stone bridge was lined with three buildings: At the south stood a tower with a door at the base, near which stood the pontoneer's house; in the north a chapel, known as Notre-Dame-du-Pont, and a small hospital then faced on each side of the roadway. The bridge was repeatedly damaged by the violent floods of the Isère. The tower, which proudly displayed the arms of the town of Romans and the Dauphiné, disappeared in the 17th century. On several occasions, destroyed arch bridges were replaced by wooden decks. In the 18th century work was undertaken for the reconstruction of the structure, completed in the century following its enlargement. However, the bridge would still endure fresh damage because on three occasions (in 1814, 1940 and 1944) its second arch was destroyed. When peace returned, it still retained the scar.

If Romans had acquired a great reputation with luxury shoe, Bourg-de-Péage owes its own to felt hats. Succeeding a solid tradition of hosiery under the Ancien Régime, mainly manufacturing women's underwear, felt headwear was introduced around 1810 by workers from Cognin in Isère. In 1811, three workshops were reported, and half a century later, this activity employed more than 400 workers divided into 16 workshops.

The felt was obtained from domestic rabbit hair, which was the subject of many processes, carried out by workers in difficult conditions of humidity, such as blowing or fulling. In the surrounding countryside, there were many workers collecting rabbit hair, and their activity was sometimes perpetuated in the name of localities. However, the installation of the railway line to Romans in 1864 put an end to the local origin of the raw material, since cheaper Australian rabbit hair was then preferred.

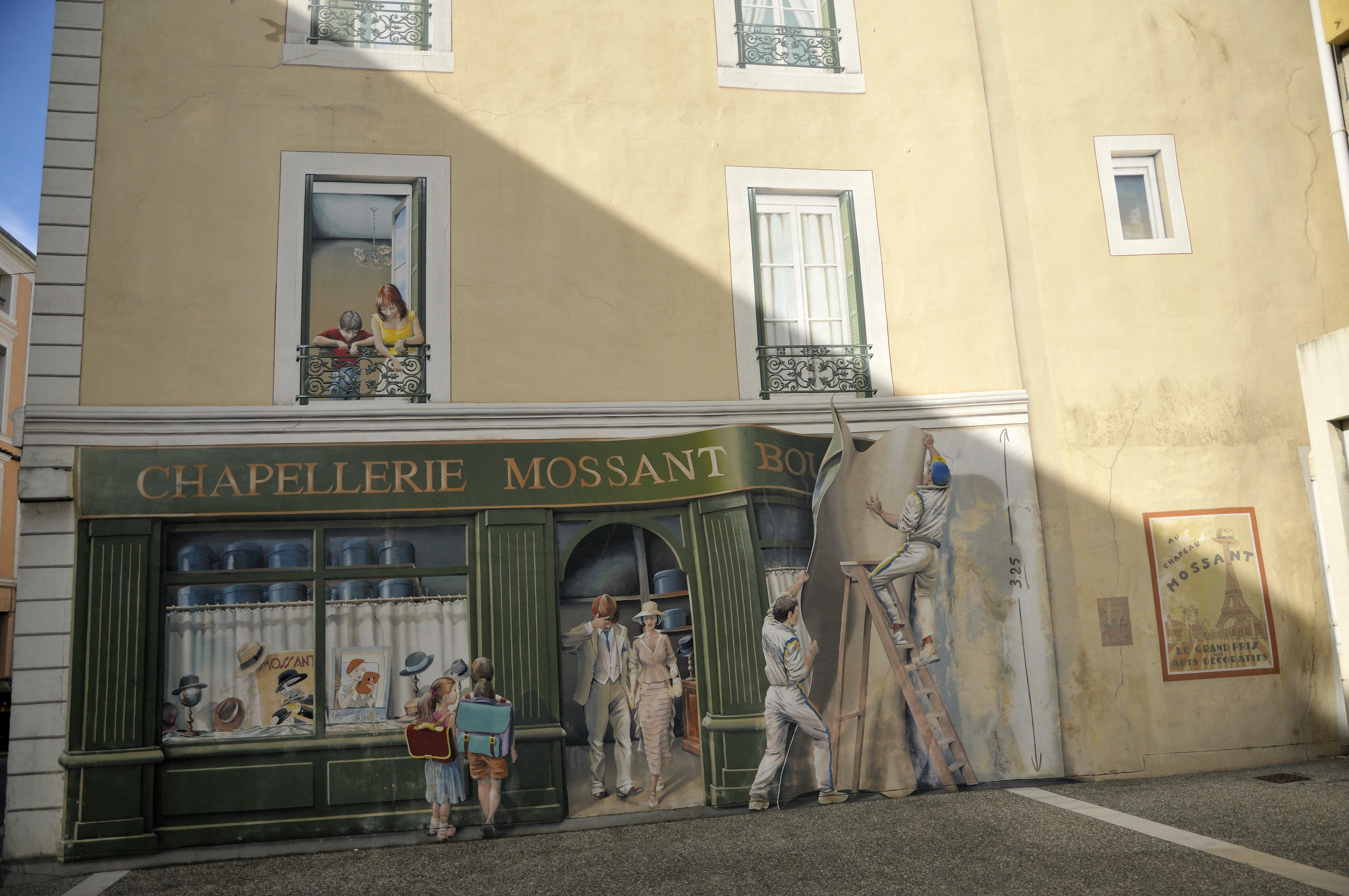
A trompe-l'œil in honour of Charles Mossant

These imports thus caused hundreds of job losses in the countryside.

In 1883, an unprecedented crisis occurred for milliners due to the protectionist attitude of some countries where production flowed. The difficulties overcome, the activity grew further still until 1929 when it reached its apogee. At that time, the Mossant business, which was the pioneer of péageoise millinery, employed more than 1,200 workers, and many other workshops produced alongside the quality headwear of Mossant.

However, from 1930, the fashion of "bare heads" and the lack of exports caused a rapid decline of the headwear, although some workshops continued to operate until 1985.

== Politics and administration ==
=== List of mayors ===
List of mayors of Bourg-de-Péage
Start	End	Name	Party	Other details
1857	1870	André Dubouchet		
May 1871		Etienne Charbonnel		
1896	1919	Louis Pirraud		
1919	1929	Charles Ducros		
May 1929	1944	François Eynard		Medical doctor, General counsel, senator
1944	1949	Charles Combe	SFIO	General counsel
1949	1953	Henri Mazade		
1953	1995	Henri Durand	DVD	General counsel
March 1995	April 2004	Didier Guillaume	PS	President of the General Council, senator
April 2004	March 2008	Jean-Félix Pupel	DVG	
March 2008	In progress	Nathalie Nieson	PS	Regional counsel, députée Re-elected in 2014

== Population and society ==
=== Demography ===
Its inhabitants are called Péageois in French.

Historical population

Year	Pop.	±% p.a.
1793	2,278	—
1800	2,339	+0.38%
1806	2,566	+1.56%
1821	2,664	+0.25%
1831	3,577	+2.99%
1836	3,604	+0.15%
1841	3,858	+1.37%
1846	3,888	+0.16%
1851	4,258	+1.83%
1856	4,454	+0.90%
1861	4,624	+0.75%
1866	4,517	−0.47%
1872	4,920	+1.43%

Year	Pop.	±% p.a.
1876	4,830	−0.46%
1881	4,806	−0.10%
1886	4,869	+0.26%
1891	5,022	+0.62%
1896	4,982	−0.16%
1901	4,958	−0.10%
1906	5,537	+2.23%
1911	5,797	+0.92%
1921	5,830	+0.06%
1926	6,271	+1.47%
1931	6,435	+0.52%
1936	6,301	−0.42%
1946	6,633	+0.51%

Year	Pop.	±% p.a.
1954	7,151	+0.94%
1962	7,804	+1.10%
1968	8,597	+1.63%
1975	8,626	+0.05%
1982	8,413	−0.36%
1990	9,428	+1.43%
1999	9,752	+0.38%
2007	10,034	+0.36%
2012	10,169	+0.27%
2017	10,205	+0.07%
2023	9,921	−0.47%

From 1962 to 1999: Population without double counting; for the years following: municipal population.
Source: Ldh/EHESS/Cassini until 1999 then INSEE

=== Education ===
Bourg-de-Péage depends on the Academy of Grenoble. The commune has several schools: Three kindergartens and four primary schools, including one private; two collèges, with one private. A school bus route was implemented by the municipality, for the schoolchildren of the commune.

=== Worship ===
The parish of Sainte Claire in Dauphiné includes the Catholic communities of Romans-sur-Isère, Bourg-de-Péage, Pizançon and Granges-lès-Beaumont.

=== Sport ===
- Rowing: Aviron Romanais Péageois, created in 1908, is the first club of the Drôme and Ardèche. The greatest rower of the club is Laurent Porchier who was several times champion of France and world champion, and also Olympic champion at the 2000 Summer Olympics in Sydney.
- Handball: Bourg-de-Péage Drôme Handball is a handball club. The women's team plays in the second division of the Championship of France for women.
- Every two years, in December, the town of Bourg-de-Péage rewards its athletes at a party at the Jean Cocteau Centre.
- Cycling: Stage 3 of the 2006 Critérium du Dauphiné Libéré, an individual time trial, occurred on a course around the commune, the stage was won by David Zabriskie. Stage 12 of the 2010 Tour de France began in Bourg-de-Péage with a stage finish in Mende. This stage was won by Joaquim Rodríguez. Stage 16 of the 2015 Tour de France will start in the commune on 20 July, and is scheduled to finish in Gap.

=== Cultural events and festivities ===
- Bourg-de-Péage has many venues for performances and exhibitions (Salle Jean Cocteau, Espace François Mitterrand, Mossant Park)
- Music Festival in the Park: Two days of concerts and entertainment.

The Rendez-vous de la magie:

The week-long festival features street performances, introductory workshops, amateur magic competitions, and events in schools and public venues throughout the city. It concludes with three evening shows featuring international professional magicians, drawing a total attendance of over 1,500 spectators.

== Economy ==
The Pascalis bakery is the oldest bakery in Bourg-de-Péage and dates from the 19th century. Its speciality is the famous pogne of Romans.

== Transport ==
=== Road network ===
Bourg de Péage is accessible from several autoroutes: A7 autoroute, 14 and 15 ; A49 autoroute, 6 , as well as several secondary roads.

=== Railway network ===
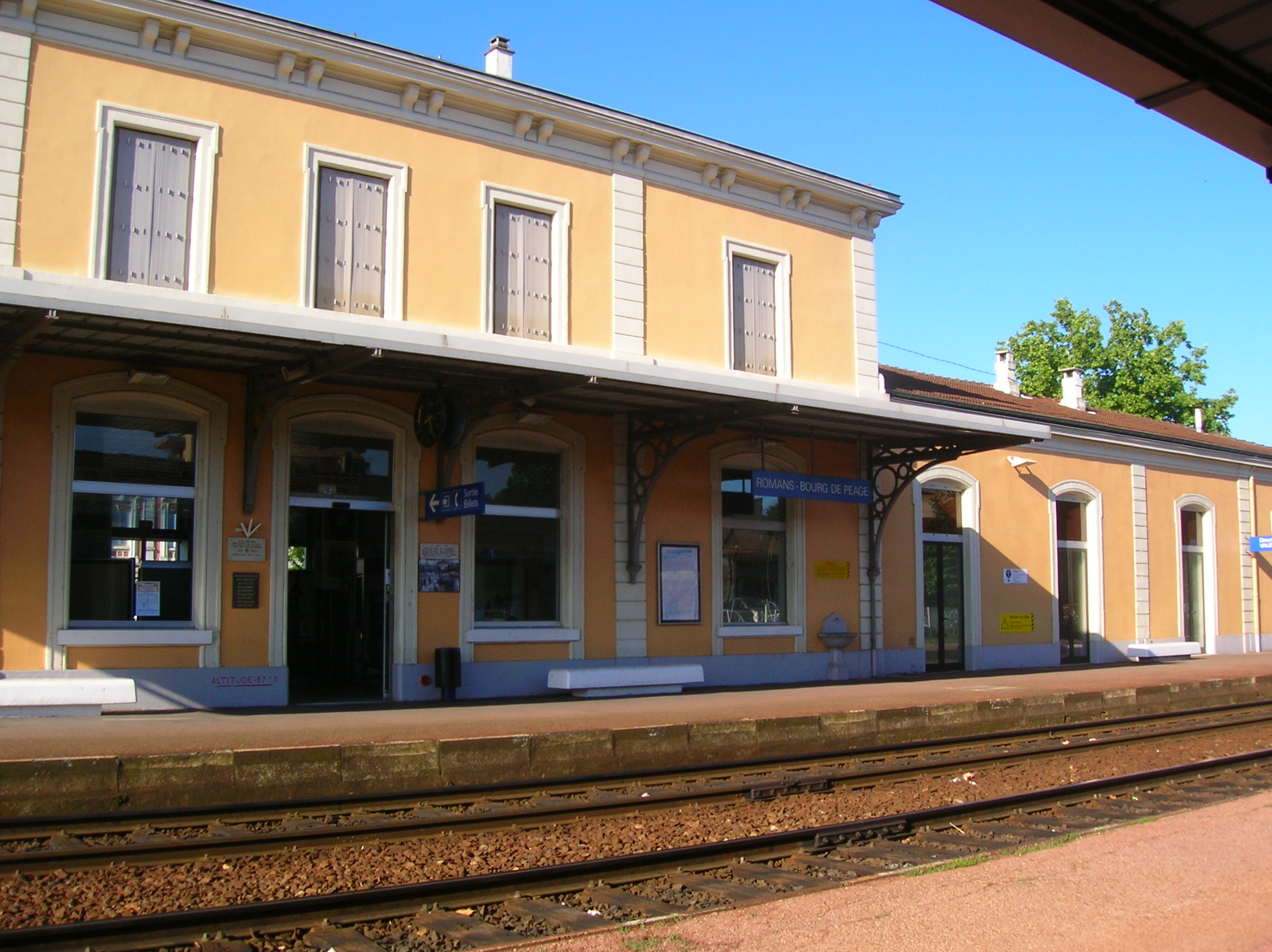
Gare TER Romans-Bourg-de-Péage

The commune has access to two stations: The Gare de Romans - Bourg-de-Péage, as well as by the TGV Valence-Rhone-Alps-South.

=== Public transport ===
The commune of Bourg-de-Péage is served by the Citéa bus network.

== Culture and heritage ==
=== Places and monuments ===
- Old bridge across the Isère between Romans-sur-Isère and Bourg-de-Péage
- Favor House (Listed from 12 April 1972), a château built between 1798 and 1810 on the field of Bayanne.
- Château de Mondy built at the end of the 17th century
- Wood of Naix
- Mossant hat shop (listed as an historic monument since 6 April 2004).
- Clos of the Hermitage
- In 2014, floral town with "three flowers" in the Concours des villes et villages fleuris since 2008: 59 hectares (150 acres) of parks and gardens, lawn, of massive, of trees and shrubs, hedges and of accompaniments of highways. An exceptional landscape that is the pride of the Peageois.
- The Vercors sports complex
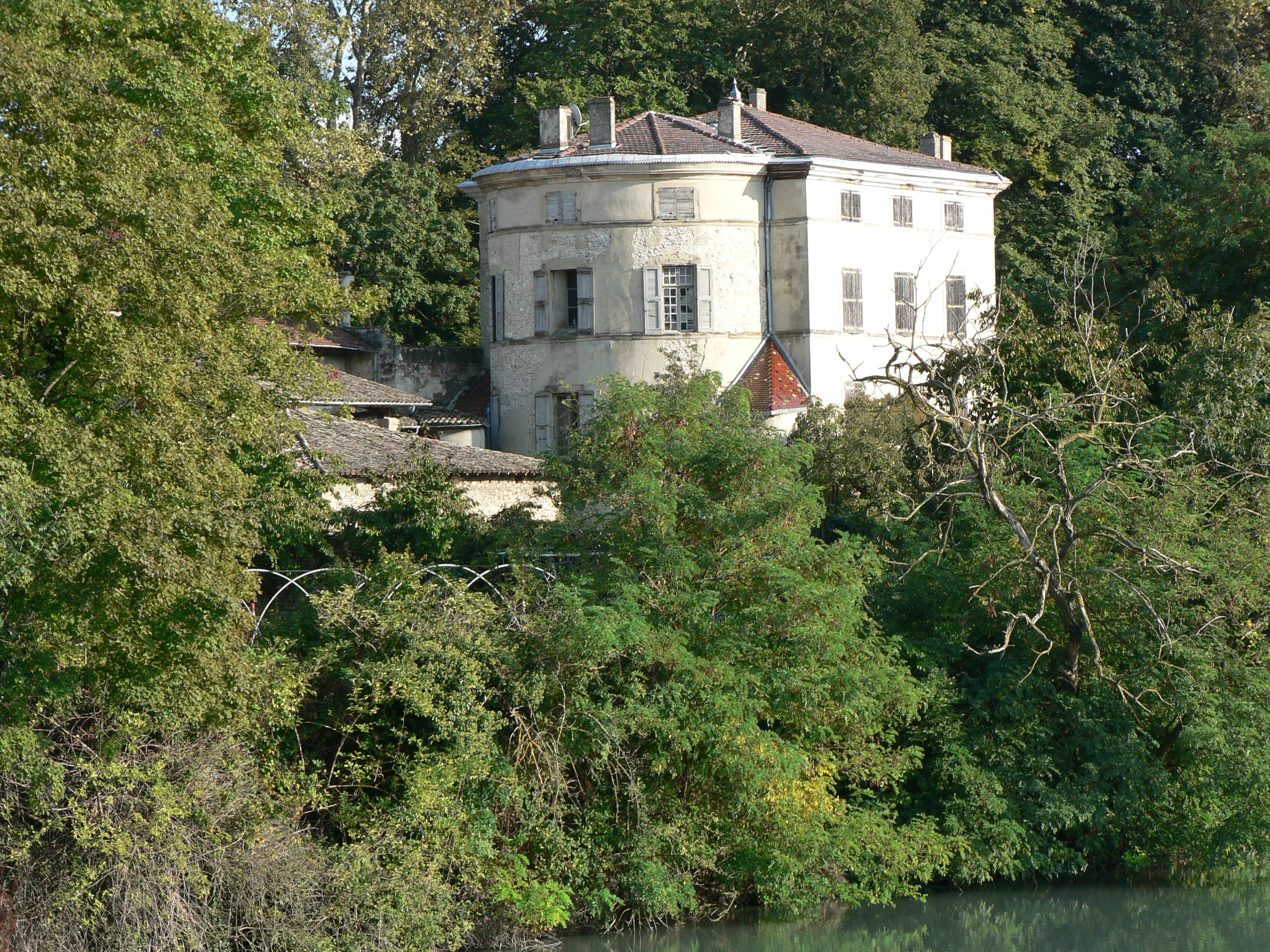
Maison Favor

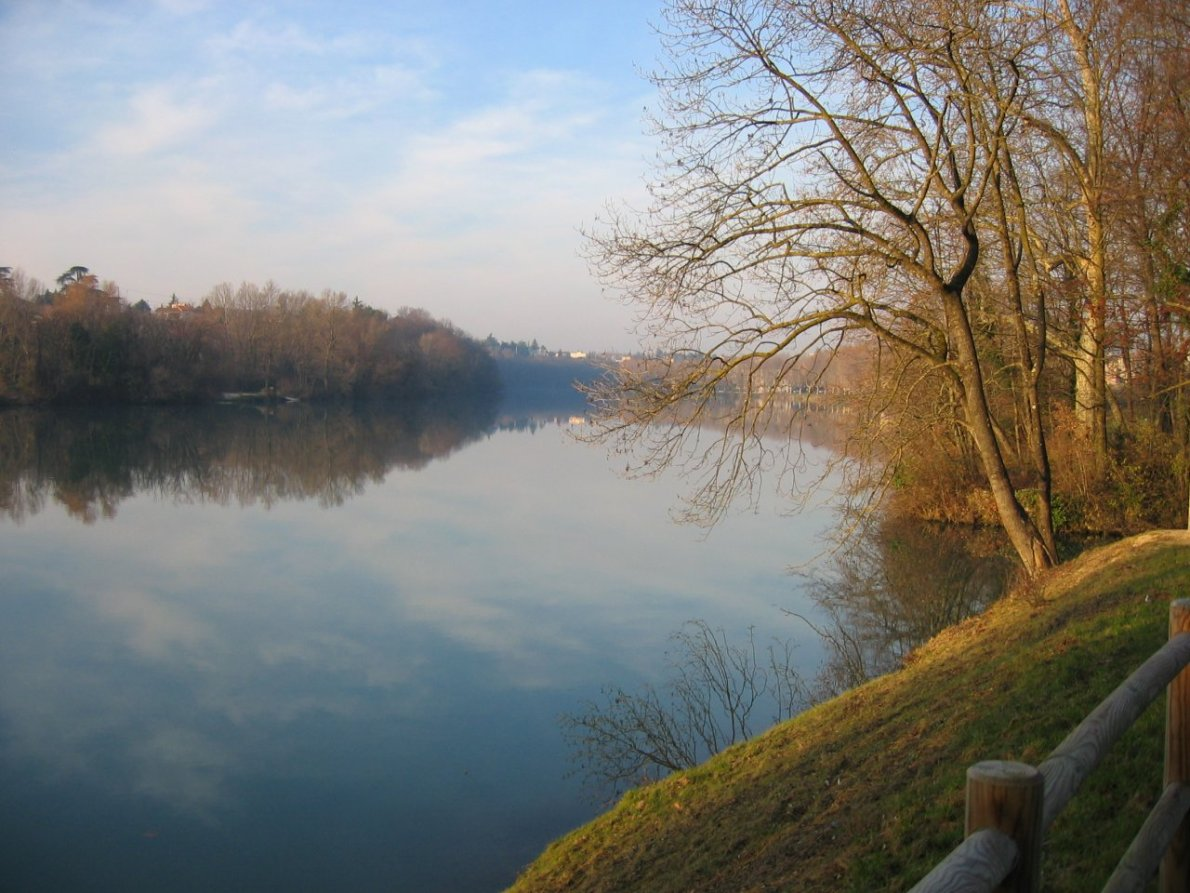
River Isère (view from the Woods of Naix)

=== Specialities ===
- Pogne
- Raviole du Dauphiné

== Notable people ==
- Marc-Antoine Jullien (1744–1821), politician
- Isidore Bertrand (1829–1914), priest and journalist
- Charles Jourdan (1883–1976), fashion designer
- Paul Dochier, (1914–1996), Tibehirine monk
- R. Toros (born 1934), sculptor, Officier of the Ordre des Arts et des Lettres (2000); Knight of the Legion of Honour (2009)
- Dani Lary (born 1958), magician
- Didier Guillaume (born 1959), politician, president of the Socialist Group in the Senate
- Nathalie Nieson (born 1969), politician, Mayor of Bourg de Péage, MP for the 4th district of Drôme
- Romain Saïss (born 1990), Moroccan footballer
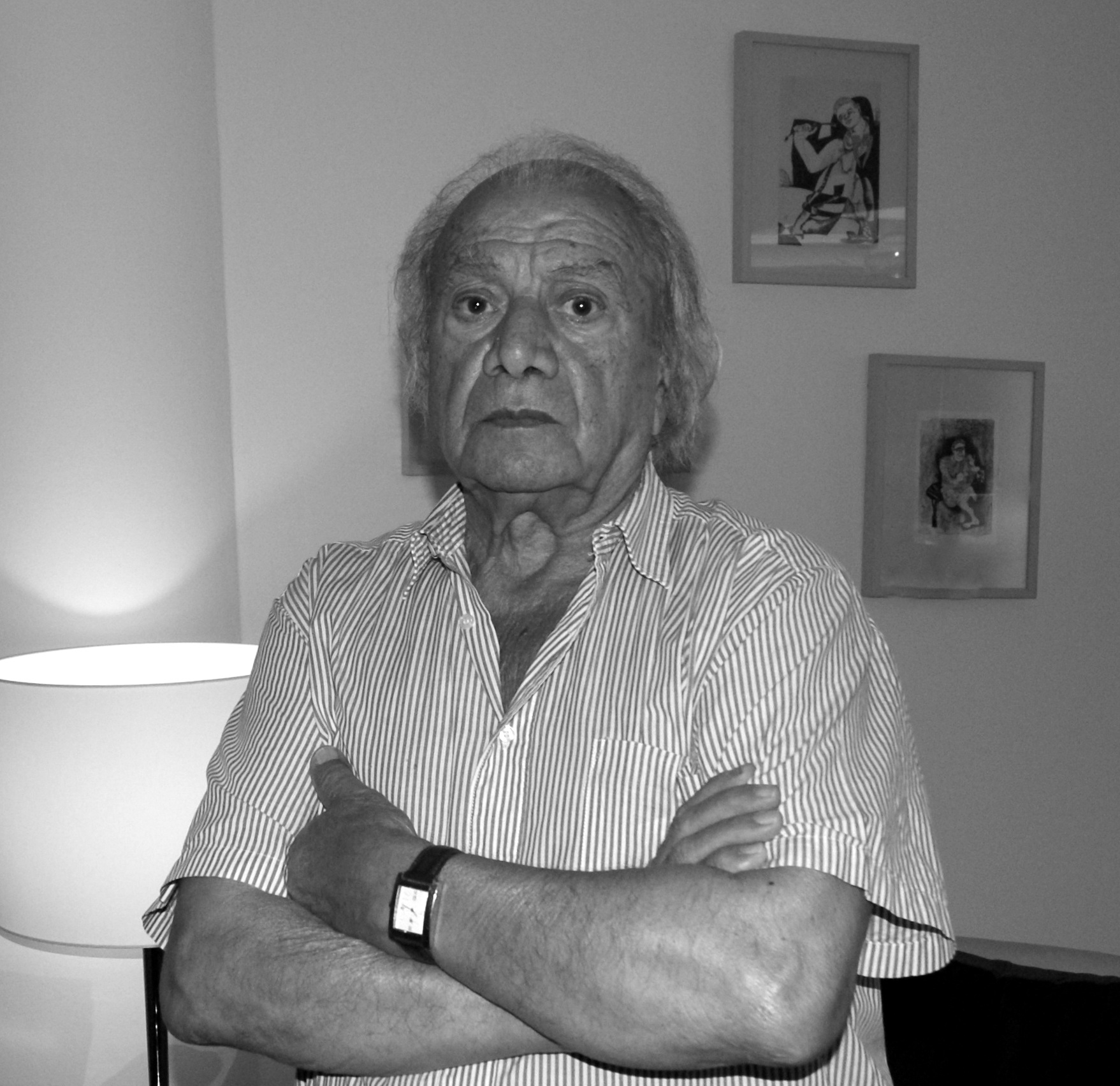
Toros Rasguélénian

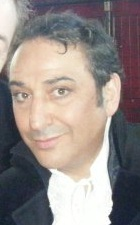
Dani Lary

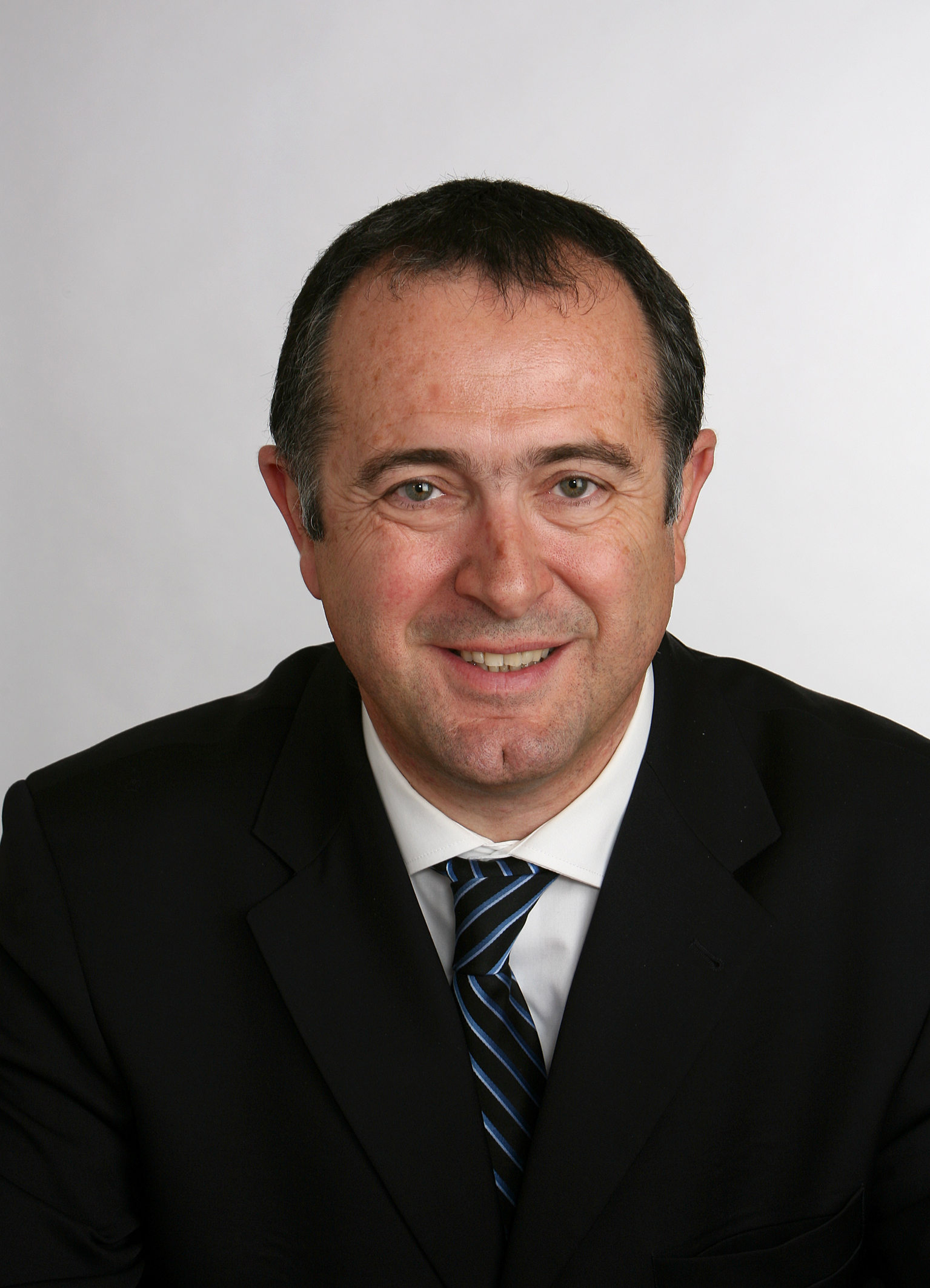
Didier Guillaume

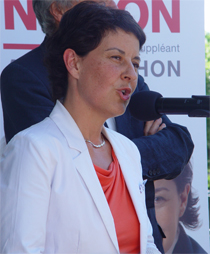
Nathalie Nieson

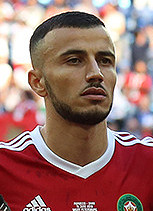
Romain Saïss

== Twin towns/sister cities ==
Bourg-de-Péage is twinned with:

- East Grinstead, England, United Kingdom
- Mindelheim, Germany
- Sant Feliu de Guíxols, Spain
- Schwaz, Austria
- Verbania, Italy

== See also ==
- Communes of the Drôme department

== Bibliography ==
- Jacquot, Laurent (2008). Romans - Traces d'Histoire [Romans - Traces of History] (in French). Dauphiné Libéré. coll. Les Patrimoines.
