= Canton of Bourg-de-Péage =

Coordinates: 45.04°N 5.05°E

The canton of Bourg-de-Péage is an administrative division of the Drôme department, southeastern France. Its borders were modified at the French canton reorganisation which came into effect in March 2015. Its seat is in Bourg-de-Péage.

It consists of the following communes:

1. Alixan
2. Bourg-de-Péage
3. Romans-sur-Isère (partly)
