= Alixan =

- Commune
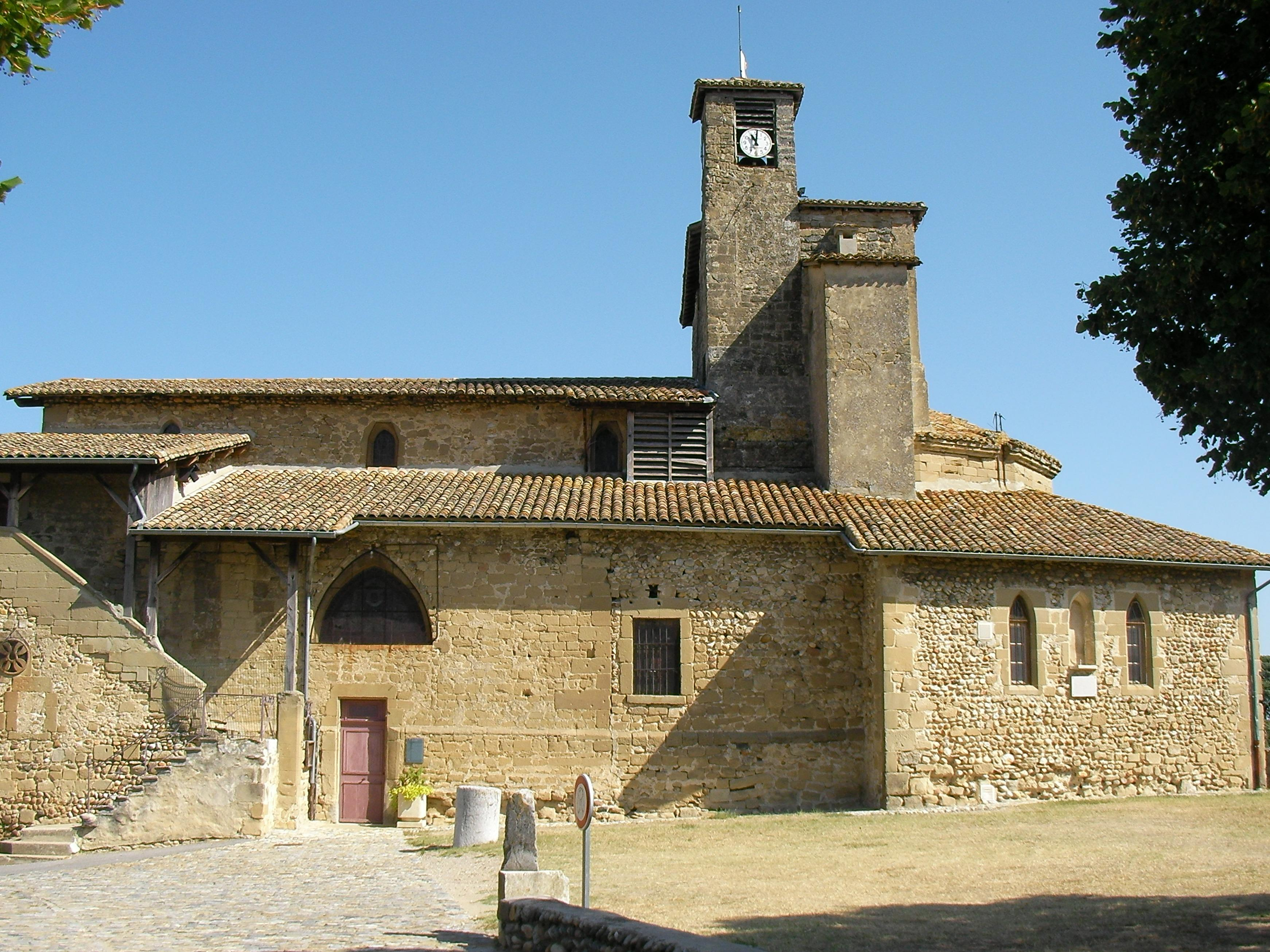
- The church of Saint-Didier
- Location of Alixan
- Location within France Location within Auvergne-Rhône-Alpes
- Coordinates: 44°58′33″N 5°01′42″E
- Country: France
- Region: Auvergne-Rhône-Alpes
- Department: Drôme
- Arrondissement: Valence
- Canton: Bourg-de-Péage
- Intercommunality: Valence Romans Agglo

Government
  - Mayor (2020–2026): Jean-Claude Duclaux
- Area^{1}: 28.28 km^{2} (10.92 sq mi)
- Highest elevation: 224 m (735 ft)
- Lowest elevation: 163 m (535 ft)
- Population (2023): 2,729
  - Density: 96.50/km^{2} (249.9/sq mi)
- Time zone: UTC+01:00 (CET)
  - Summer (DST): UTC+02:00 (CEST)
- INSEE/Postal code: 26004 /26300
- ^{1} French Land Register data, which excludes lakes, ponds, glaciers > 1 km^{2} (0.386 sq mi or 247 acres) and river estuaries.

Alixan (French pronunciation: [aliksɑ̃]; Occitan: Aleissan) is a commune in the Drôme department in southeastern France. Valence TGV station, in the west of the commune, has rail connections to Valence, Grenoble, Paris, Lyon, Marseille, Montpellier and several other destinations.

== Population ==
Historical population
Year	Pop.	±% p.a.
1968	1,149	—
1975	1,099	−0.63%
1982	1,335	+2.82%
1990	1,703	+3.09%
1999	2,080	+2.25%
2007	2,268	+1.09%
2012	2,452	+1.57%
2017	2,509	+0.46%
2023	2,729	+1.41%
Source: INSEE

== See also ==
- Communes of the Drôme department
