= Raviole du Dauphiné =

French pasta dish

Ravioles du Dauphiné (English: "Dauphiné ravioli"), also known as Ravioles de Romans ("Ravioli of Romans"), are a French regional speciality, similar to a very tiny ravioli and consisting of two layers of pasta made out of soft wheat flour, eggs and water, surrounding a filling of Comté or French Emmental cheese, faisselle made of cow's milk, butter and parsley. As the name suggests, they are usually associated with the historical region of Dauphiné in South-Central France, particularly around the town of Romans-sur-Isère in the department of Drôme, Auvergne-Rhône-Alpes. The Ravioles du Dauphiné appellation has been legally protected since 1989, and received the Label Rouge in 1998 and is also protected by a PGI since 1989.

== History ==
The first texts mentioning raviole date from 1228. They were widely consumed in the Dauphiné region during the Middle Ages, filled with either meat or root vegetables. Meatless ravioles were often consumed either by poor people or around Lent or other periods of fasting. The first mention of ravioles specifically from the town of Romans dates from 1807, when the use of vegetables started to be replaced by cheese as the local population became more prosperous.

By the 1960s, ravioles started to become produced on an industrial scale, with 100 tonnes of ravioles being produced annually by 1975. Since the 1990s ravioles have also become available in supermarkets.

== Geographical origin ==
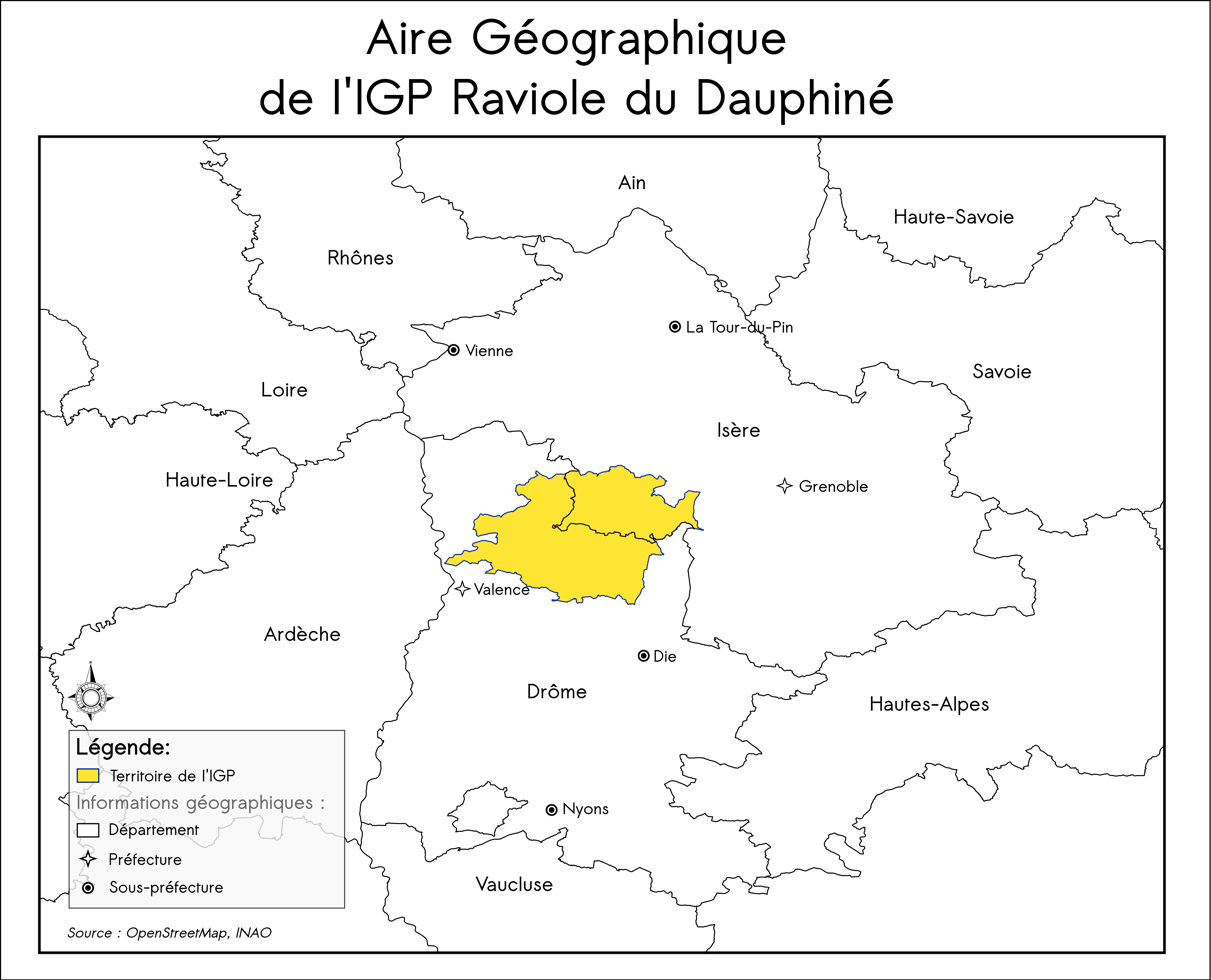
Yellow: place of origin of Ravioles du Dauphiné

Ravioles du Dauphiné are produced in Romans-sur-Isère and more generally in the region of Royans overlapping the two departments of Drôme and Isère, Auvergne-Rhône-Alpes. Any eggs or creme cheese used in the making of ravioles must also come from this region.

== Production and commercialisation ==
Around 2,500 tonnes of ravioles were produced in 2005, which by 2007 had more than doubled to 5,103 tonnes.

Ravioles are usually sold in plaques of 48 pieces, with each plaque weighing around 60–65 grams, and are often eaten in regional restaurants and notably during the Ravioles and Pognes (a large doughnut shaped brioche which is another local specialty) festival held in the town of Romans every September, or at the traditional Raviole Festival of Eymeux.

== Gastronomy ==
Ravioles can be poached in hot water or grilled in a frying pan, and then served in meat broth, in a gratin or as part of a salad.

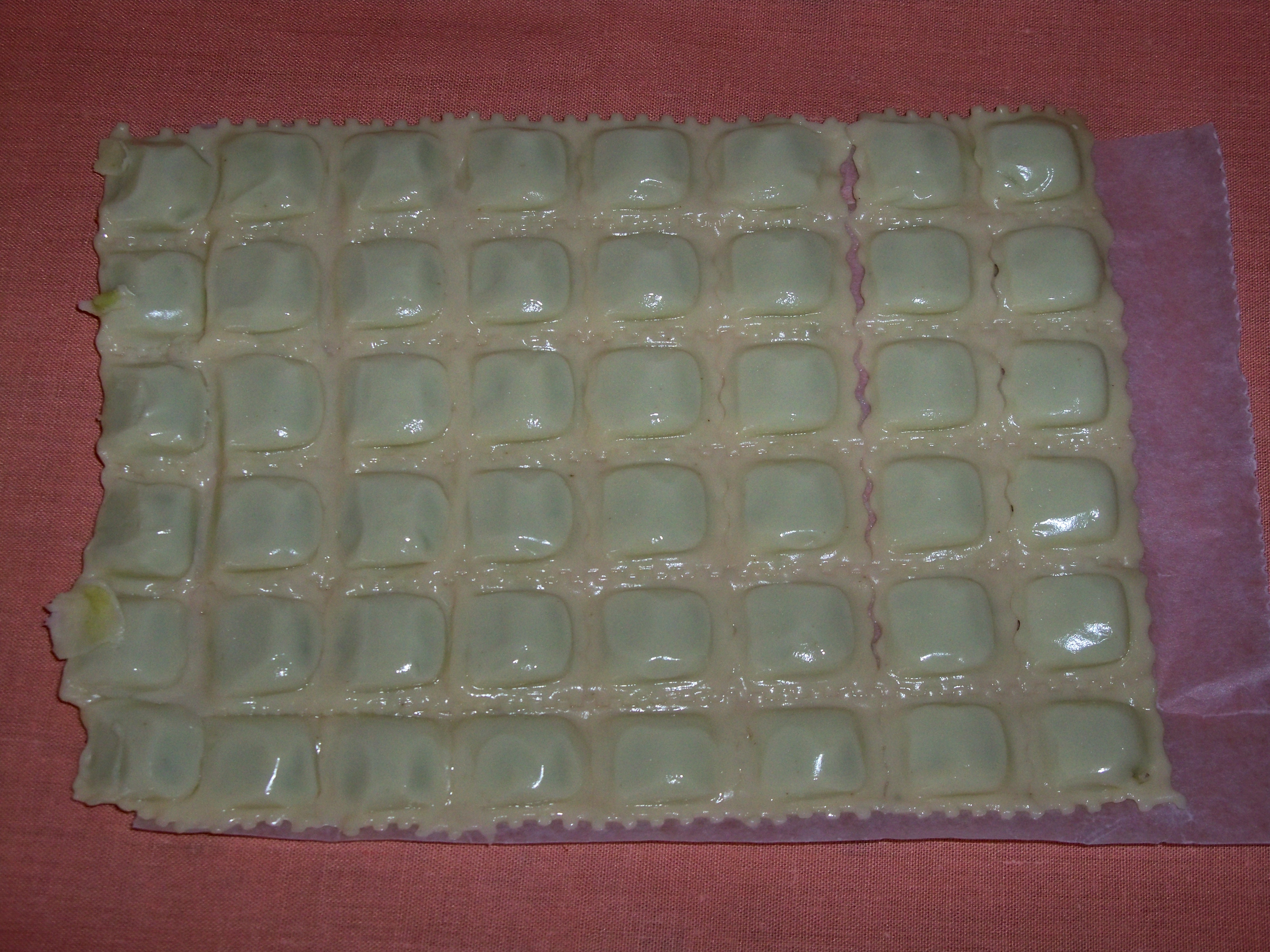
Plaque of raw ravioles

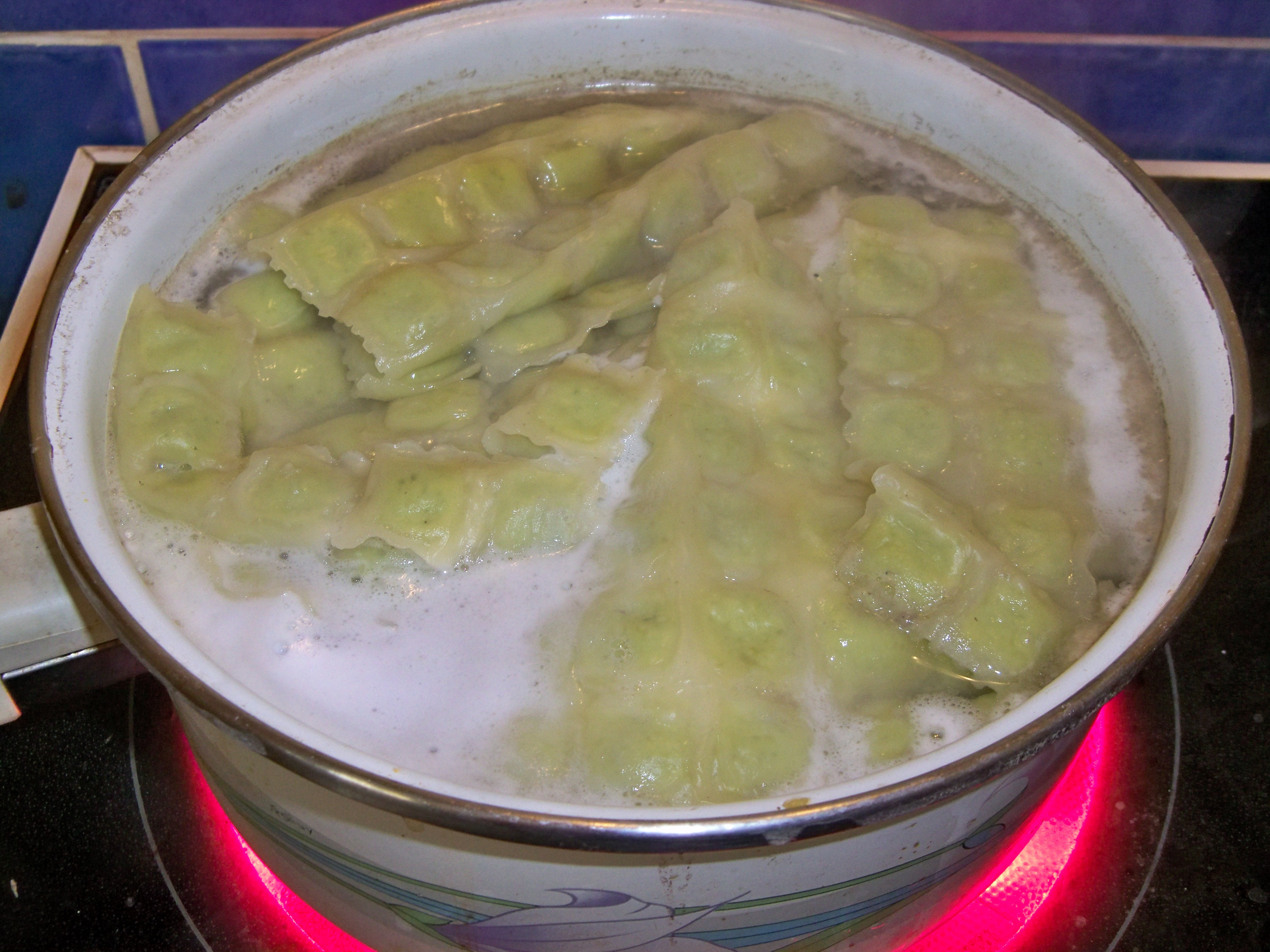
Raviole bake

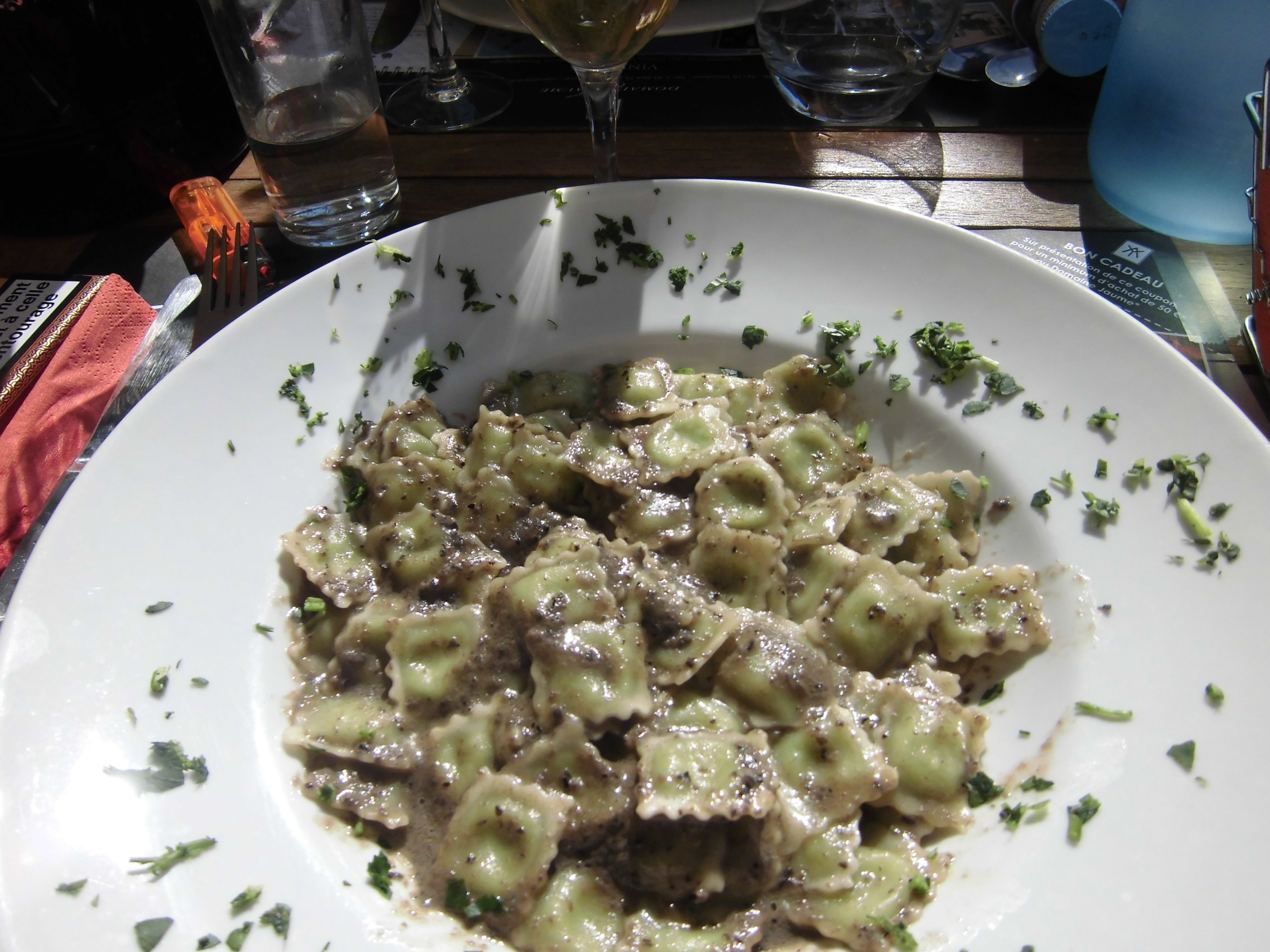
Prepared ravioles

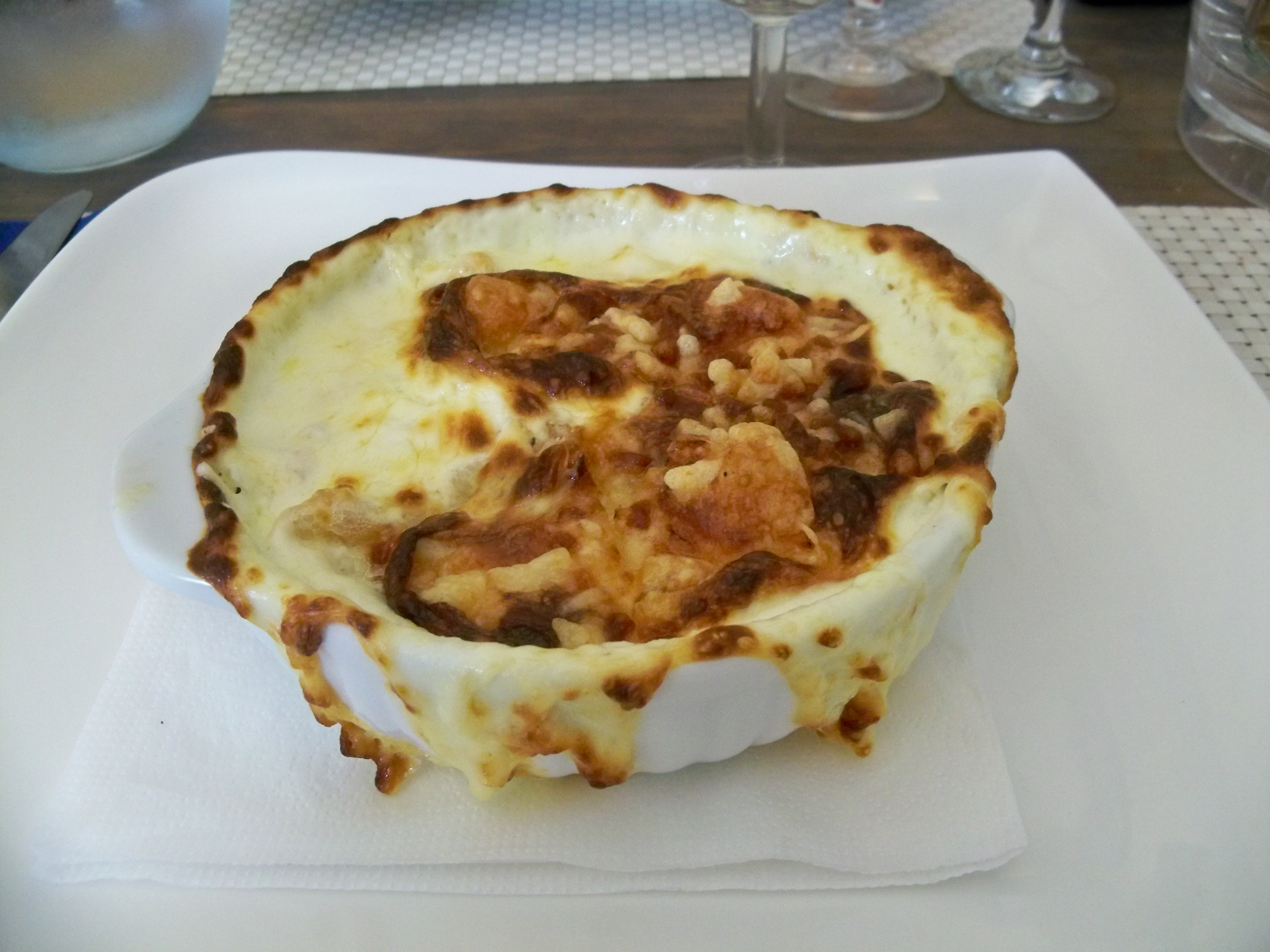
Gratin de Ravioles

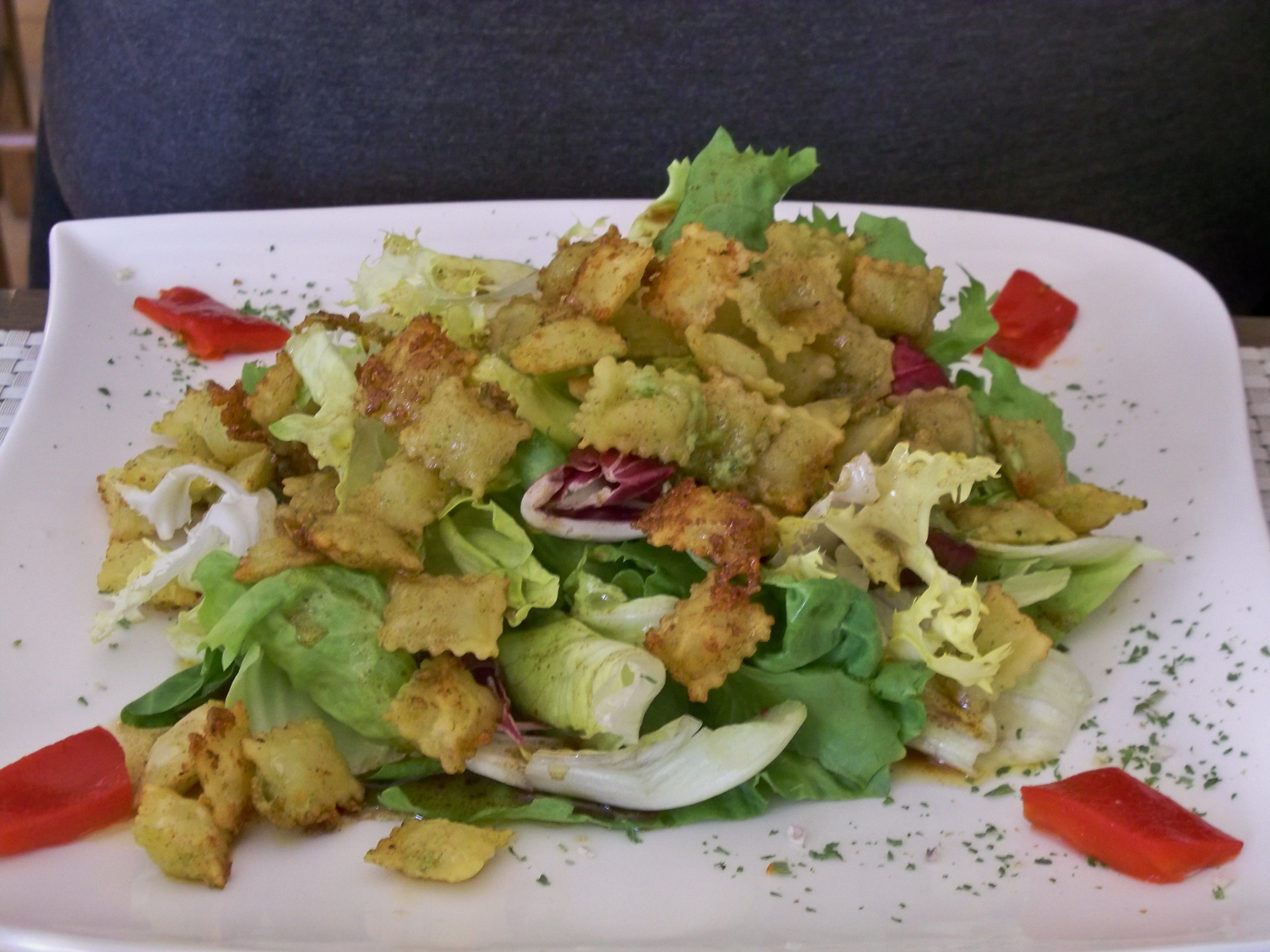
Ravioles with salad

== See also ==
- French cuisine
- List of dumplings
- Ravioli

== Bibliography ==
- Jacquot, Laurent (1996). "Pour écrire l'histoire de la «Raviole du Dauphiné»" [To write the history of the "Raviole du Dauphiné"] (PDF). Études Drômoises (in French) (99): 41–44.
