= R. Toros =

French sculptor (1934–2020)

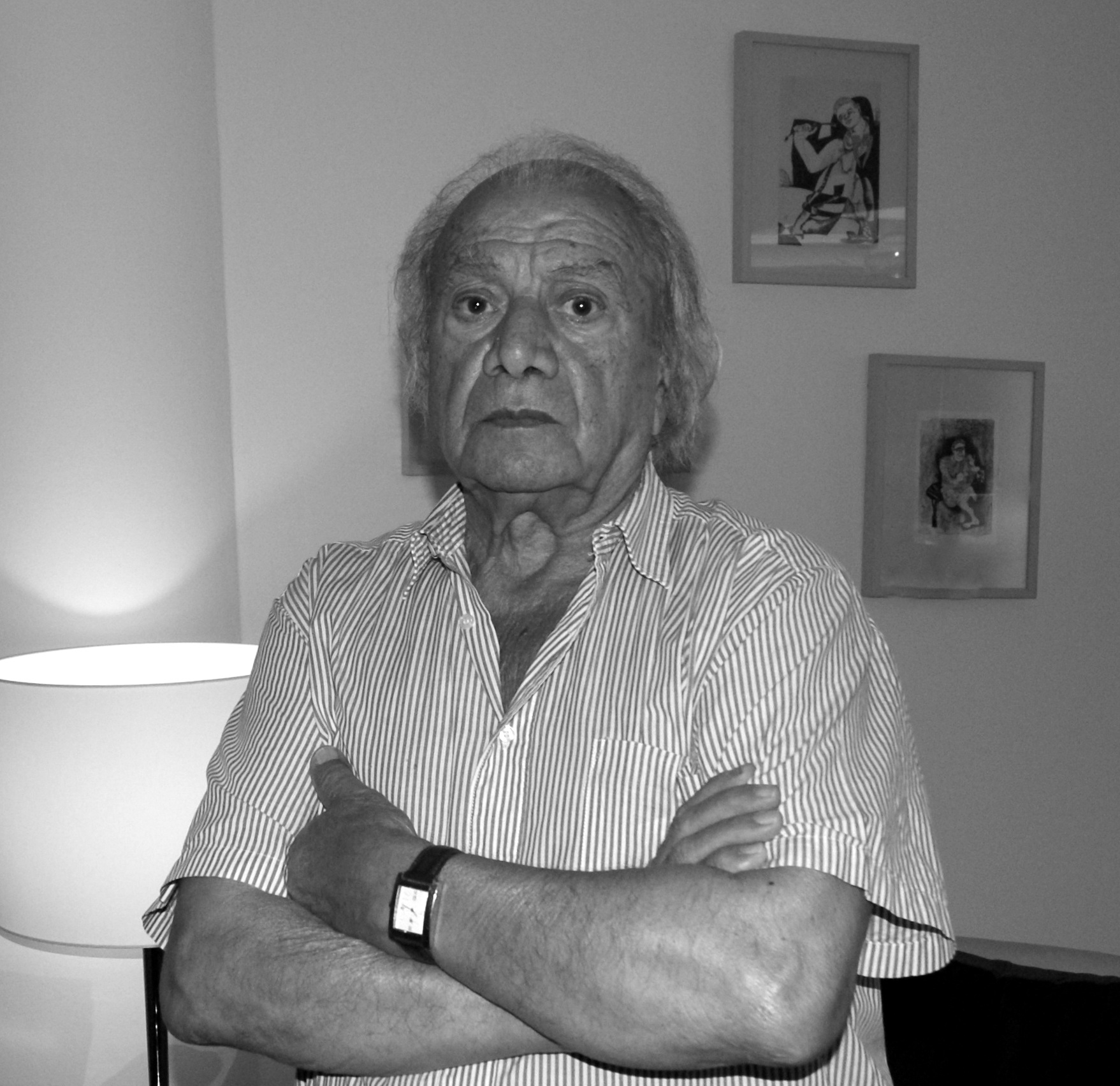
- Born: Toros Rasguélénian; 12 December 1934; Aleppo, French Syria
- Died: 29 July 2020 (aged 85); Romans-sur-Isère, France
- Occupation: Sculptor

Toros Rasguélénian (12 December 1934 – 29 July 2020), known professionally as R. Toros, was a Syrian-French sculptor.

== Biography ==
Toros was born in Syria to an Armenian family. He left school at the age of 11 and worked as a welder, locksmith, and blacksmith. At 25, he had his own ironworking business. A church architect ordered a cross from him for the steeple of the Armenian Orthodox Church of Surp Kevork in Aleppo. During a trip to Armenia, he discovered the David of Sassoun statue. Upon the statue's discovery, Toros experienced a revelation and returned to Aleppo to begin sculpting. He started to sculpt metal and made fountains, and after several exhibitions he won his first sculpture prize in 1966, with L’Émancipation de la femme arabe.

In 1967, Toros went to France for artistic studies. He met numerous artists and sculptors who dissuaded him from entering the fine arts academies. Therefore, he relied on his personal experience to help him in his artistic career. He settled in Valence, then in Romans-sur-Isère, both in the Drôme region, where there was a large Armenian presence at the time. He made a large amount of monuments in memory of the victims of the Armenian genocide, of which his uncle was a victim. These monuments can be found in Valence, Aix-en-Provence, Marseille, and Saint-Étienne. He awarded the Trophée Toros to the best piece of Franco-Armenian literature published each year in Marseille.

R. Toros died on 29 July 2020 in Romans-sur-Isère at the age of 85.

== Works ==
=== Exhibitions ===
- Galerie Bost, Valence (1968)
- Salon d'automne, Paris (1970)
- Galerie Jean Dulac, Lyon (1972)
- Galerie Pyramide, Vienna (1975)
- Galerie Colette Dubois, Paris (1979-1980)
- Fondation Erich Schickling Ottobeuren, Germany (1998)
- Consortium International des Arts, Menton, Mégeve, Saint-Tropez (1996-2000)
- Galerie Saint Hubert, Lyon
- Rétrospective Musée d'Art contemporain, Montélimar (2012-2013)
- Du Dessin à la sculpture - Musée International de la chaussure, Romans-sur-Isère (2016)
- La Paix : Toros œuvre intégrale UNESCO, Paris (2017)

=== Monuments in Syria ===
- La fontaine aux oiseaux, Aleppo (1965)
- L'émancipation de la femme arabe, Aleppo (1966)

== Bibliography ==
- Ligne de femmes
- Plénitude de Toros
- Du dessin à la sculpture
- Toros dinandier d'art
- Toros Sculptures

== Filmography ==
- Le Voluptueux
- Destin et Art
- Un destin documentaire
- Toros sculpteur
