= Mossant =

Mossant poster painted by Leonetto Cappiello (1935).

Mossant was a famous brand of hat manufactured in France and well known in the United States for most of the twentieth century. The company was founded by Charles Mossant in the nineteenth century, and by 1929 more than 2,000 hats a day were being produced. Half of them were directly shipped to the U.S.;.

The company’s felt hat production ceased entirely in 1953

== Current day ==
The trademark now owned by Baoding Huayi Hats Co.. Ltd. which is selling the hats through an online retailer listed as MOSSANT LLC

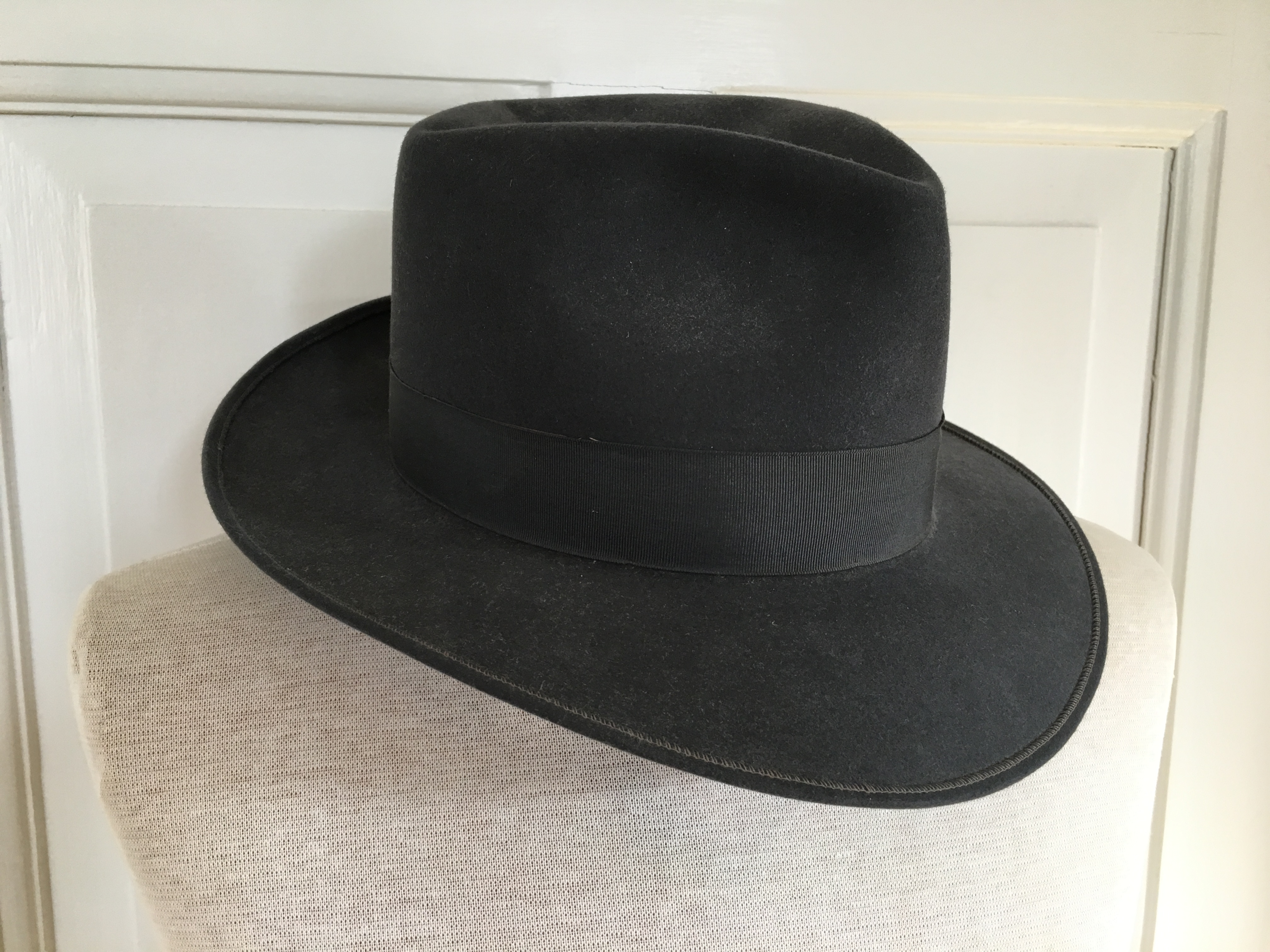
Fedora from Mossant.
