= Tour de Ratières =

Medieval tower in France

Coordinates: 45°11′07″N 4°58′22″E

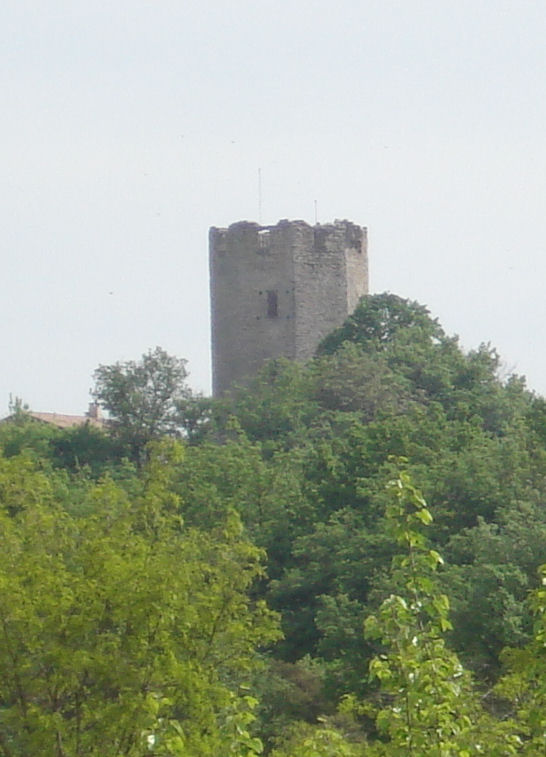
Tour de Ratières

The Tour de Ratières, built in the commune of Ratières in the north of the Drôme département of France, is a medieval tower once the keep of a castle. Approximately 15 metres (49.2 ft) high and hexagonal in plan, it overlooks the village and the surrounding plain.

== History ==
The Tour de Ratières is a Carolingian tower protected as a monument historique since 21 October 1926 by the French Ministry of Culture.

Excavations in 1993, at the time of important renovations, confirmed the existence of an earlier occupation of the site, possibly a motte-and-bailey castle.

== Architecture ==
The castle was organised around a 14th-century octagonal keep, notable for various features designed for comfort, traces of which can be discerned on the interior walls. The present ground floor was a cellar or prison. Access to the building was made on the first floor, where there are still traces of a fireplace and chimney. The second floor has a well-preserved latrine, and the third floor has large windows which could have functioned as lookout. The coussièges (window seats) would have been occupied by those keeping a watch over the comings and goings.

The castle is perched on a hillock and dominates a lower courtyard containing:

- in the west, the "farm", a medieval two-storey building used as a stable;
- in the east, a house built in the 19th century by adding walls to the ruins of two phases on earlier construction and a barn

== Garden ==
The castle has a garden designed by Paolo Tonini and created in 1993. Decorated with contemporary sculptures, visitors may, over an area of 5 hectares, see different gardens: an alley of rose trees, a medieval garden, rose garden, perennials garden, Italian garden.

== See also ==
- List of castles in France

== Bibliography ==
- I. Rémy, Etude archéologique et architecturale du site de Ratières (Drôme), Lyon, Université Lumière - Lyon 2, 1993.
- Anne et Fabian Da Costa, Châteaux de la Drôme, Ed. La Taillanderie, 2000, 64 p. (ISBN 2-87629-213-0)
