= Baronnies =

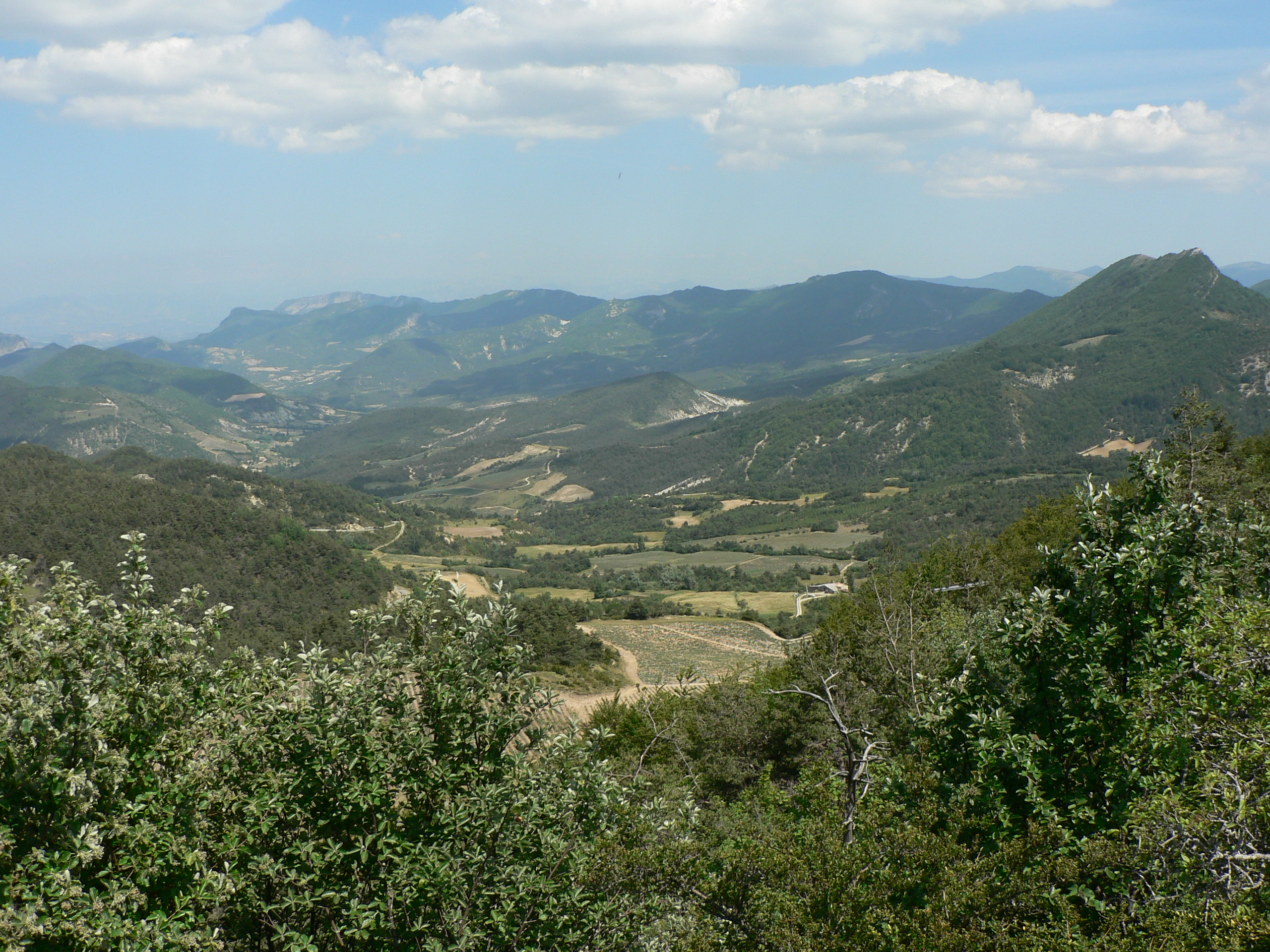
Les Baronnies viewed from Col de Perty

The Baronnies (French pronunciation: [baʁɔni]) is a historic name for the area east and north of Mont Ventoux in Southern France.

Today most of the Baronnies is part of the department of Drôme (a part of the Auvergne-Rhône-Alpes region). Smaller areas in the east and south belong to the departments of Vaucluse, Hautes-Alpes and Alpes-de-Haute-Provence (part of the Provence-Alpes-Côte d'Azur region). The area of roughly 2,000 km^{2} (770 sq mi) is sparsely populated; the 1999 census counted only 22,000 inhabitants. Since the 17th century les Baronnies, especially its eastern parts, suffered from land flight due to harsh economic conditions. Starting in the 1980s land flight has stopped and the population is now increasing especially in and around the towns of Nyons, Buis-les-Baronnies, Mirabel-aux-Baronnies, Faucon and Puymeras. There are plans to create the Parc Naturel Régional des Baronnies. The area is paradise for hiking, mountaineering, rock climbing, cycling, mountain biking, horse-riding, hang gliding and paragliding.

== History ==
Legend has it that Hannibal, the Carthaginian leader crossed les Baronnies with his elephants during the Second Punic War (218 - 201 B.C.). Later the area retired Roman soldiers were given land here. After the Roman Empire collapsed in the 3rd century, hundreds of years of invasions by Franks, Lombards, Saracens and marauding bands followed. During this period local fiefs started to fortify villages and consolidate power. In the 11th century the area was part of the Holy Roman Empire. During the Barons of Mévouillon consolidated their power over a large part of les Baronnies, they ruled for roughly 300 years from capital in Buis-les-Baronnies. As a result of a family feud in 1125, the western part of les Baronnies was ruled by a different line of Mévouillons. They called themselves Barons de Montauban, hence the name "les Baronnies" (plural). They established their capital in Nyons. Within a short period of time both had to sell their possessions to the Count of Vienne, nicknamed le Dauphin (the dolphin was his coat of arms), who ceded his territory to the King of France in 1349 to pay his debts.

Similar to the Luberon, the Baronnies was a stronghold of Protestantism in Provence. It suffered heavily during the French Wars of Religion (1562-1598). Two of the most notable military leaders came from the Baronnies: Charles Dupuy-Montbrun, the Protestant leader from Montbrun-les-Bains and Faulque Thollon de Sainte Jalle, the Catholic leader from Sainte-Jalle. After a short lived economic revival the pest struck in 1629 and then again in 1652. The population was decimated.

The period from the 18th century to modern day was marked by economic decline and land flight. Only in the 1980s were the Baronnies "discovered". Tourism started to develop and the area between Vaison-la-Romaine and Nyons started to become very popular with tourists and retirees.

== Towns and villages ==
The Baronnies has two historic towns, Nyons and Buis-les-Baronnies. There are many rustic ancient villages, most notable are Brantes, Faucon, Mirabel-aux-Baronnies, Mollans-sur-Ouvèze, Montbrun-les-Bains, La Motte-Chalancon, Orpierre, Puymeras, Rémuzat, Rousset-les-Vignes, Sainte-Jalle, Séderon and Venterol. Also notable is the castle of Aulan near Montbrun-les-Bains.

Main economic activity is agriculture and tourism. Nyons is the center of the local olive tree cultivation with numerous oil mills, an olive oil cooperative and an olive tree/olive oil museum. The olives grown in Nyons and les Baronnies have an AOC (Appellation d'Origine Contrôlée) quality label.
