= Jewish quarter (diaspora) =

Area of a city traditionally inhabited by Jews

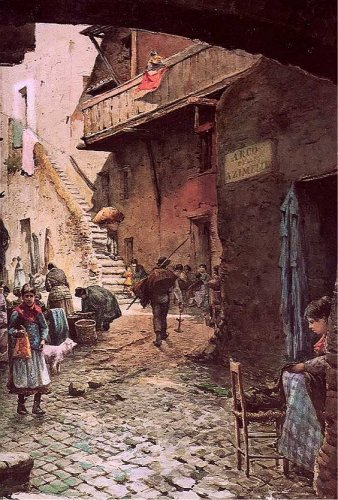
An 1880 watercolour of the Roman Ghetto by Ettore Roesler Franz.

In the Jewish diaspora, a Jewish quarter (also known as jewry, juiverie, Judengasse, Jewynstreet, Jewtown, Judería or proto-ghetto) is the area of a city traditionally inhabited by Jews. Jewish quarters, like the Jewish ghettos in Europe, were often the outgrowths of segregated ghettos instituted by the surrounding Christian or Muslim authorities. A Yiddish term for a Jewish quarter or neighborhood is "Di yiddishe gas" (Yiddish: די ייִדישע גאַס), or "The Jewish quarter." While in Ladino, they are known as maalé yahudí, meaning "The Jewish quarter".

Many European and Near Eastern cities once had a historical Jewish quarter and some still have it. The history of the Jews in Iraq is documented from the time of the Babylonian captivity c. 586 BC. Iraqi Jews constitute one of the world's oldest and most historically significant Jewish communities.

== Arab world ==
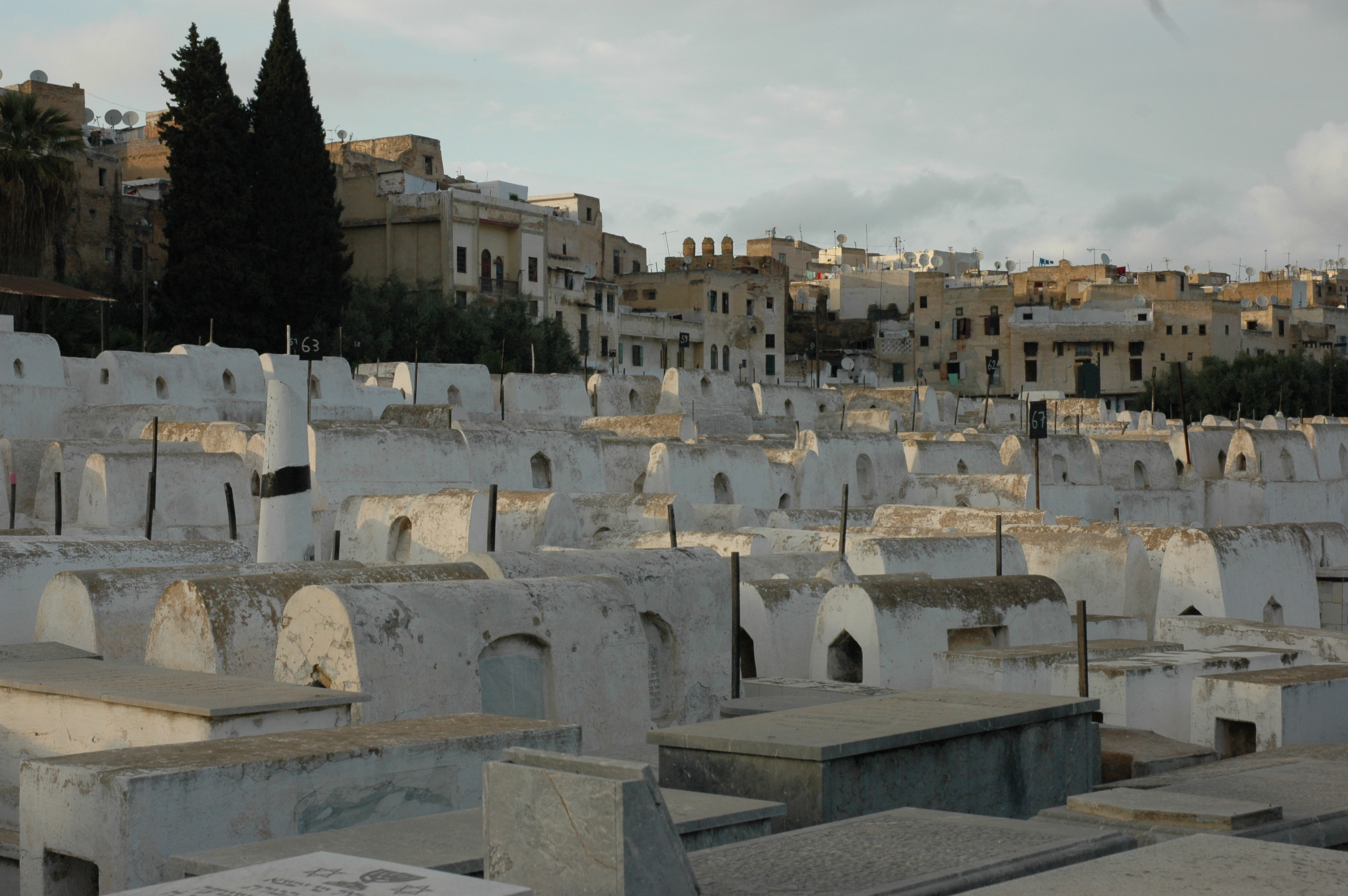
The Jewish Cemetery of the Mellah of Fez

From the late medieval and early modern period onwards Jews, the only remaining dhimmi, were increasingly confined to ghettolike quarters, such as the mellah in Morocco, the hara in Algeria and Tunisia and the qa'a in Yemen. The mellah of Fez, founded in the fifteenth century, became the prototype of the Moroccan ghetto. Though it was probably founded in order to protect and not to punish the Jews, they resented the transfer and viewed it as bitter exile and manifestation of a painful segregation.

Later foundation were founded with the explicit intent of ostracism rather than protection. As such, Jews often had to wear distinguishing clothes and were not allowed to wear shoes outside the mellah. In cities, a mellah was surrounded by a wall with a fortified gateway, often close to kasbah of the king or governor, whereas rural mellahs were separate villages inhabited solely by the Jews.

== Europe ==
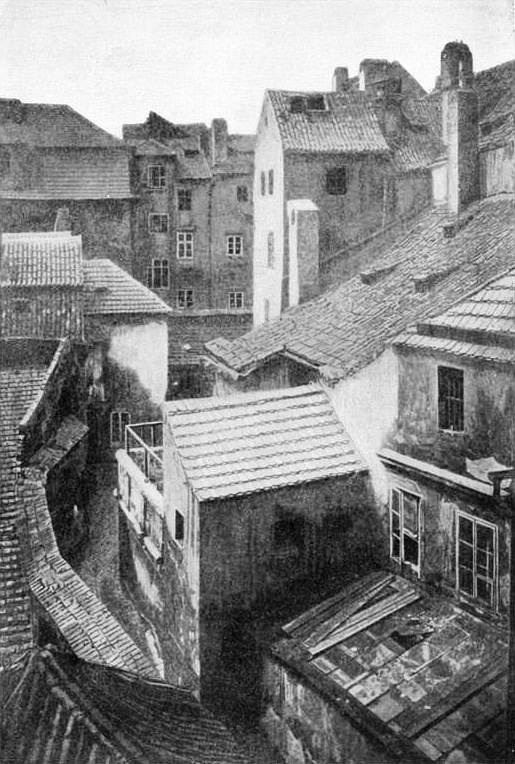
Prague-Josefov, which was demolished between 1893 and 1913

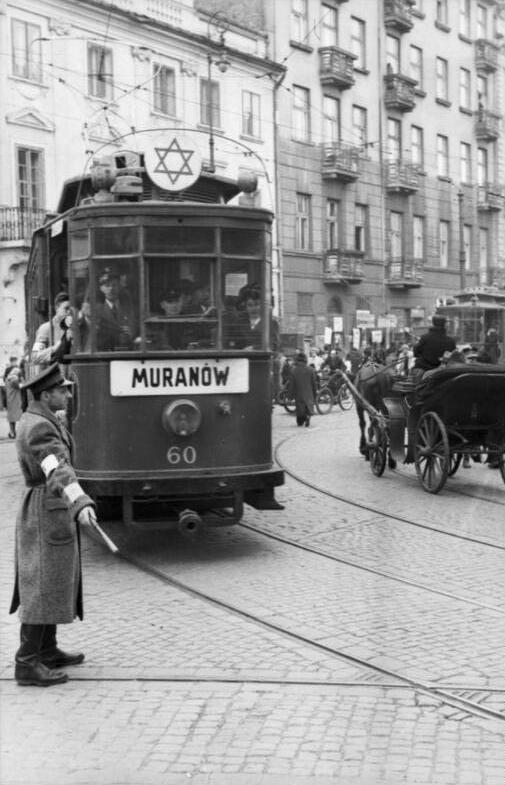
The Warsaw Ghetto in May 1941

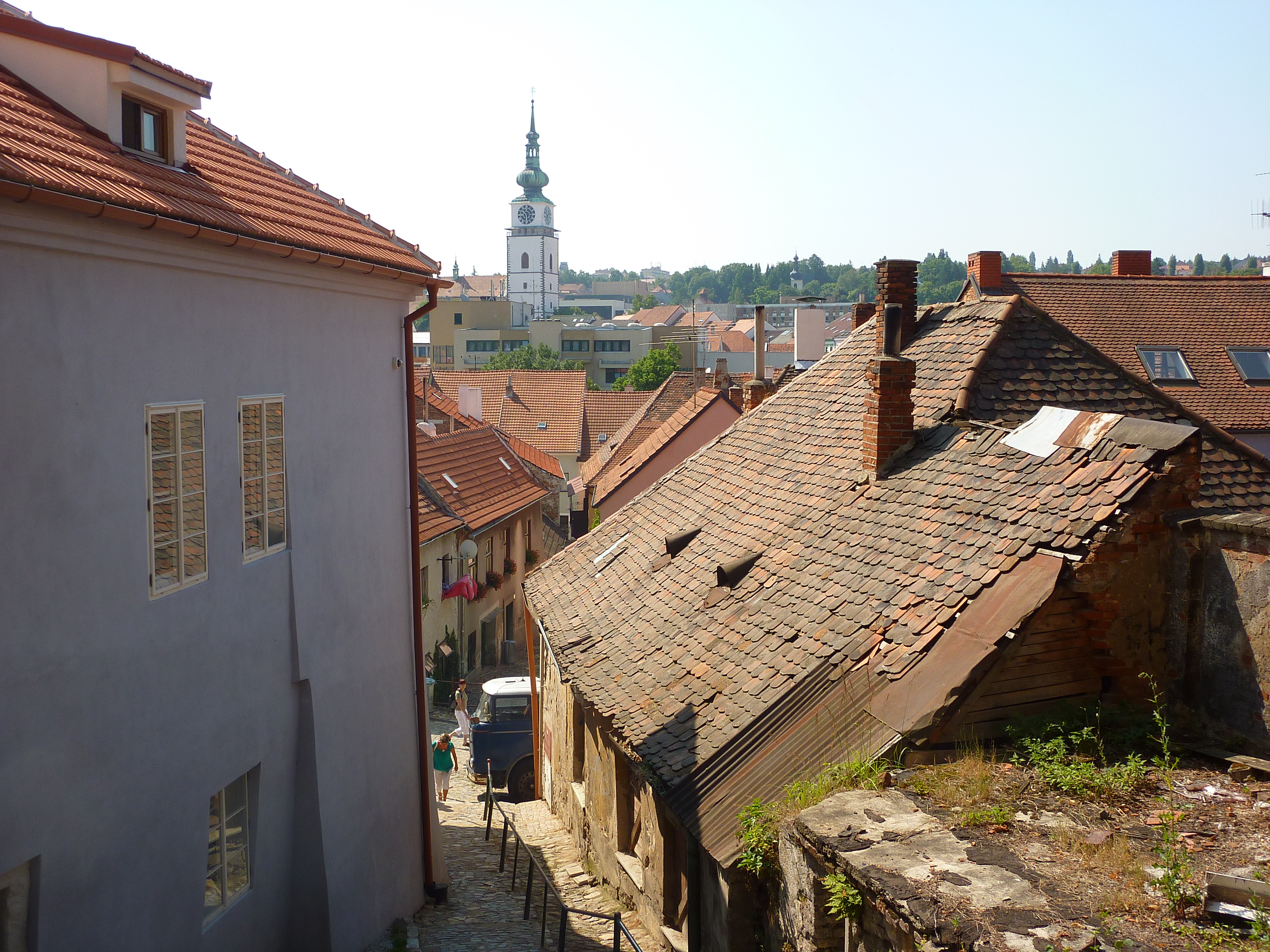
Jewish Quarter of Třebíč, Czech Republic

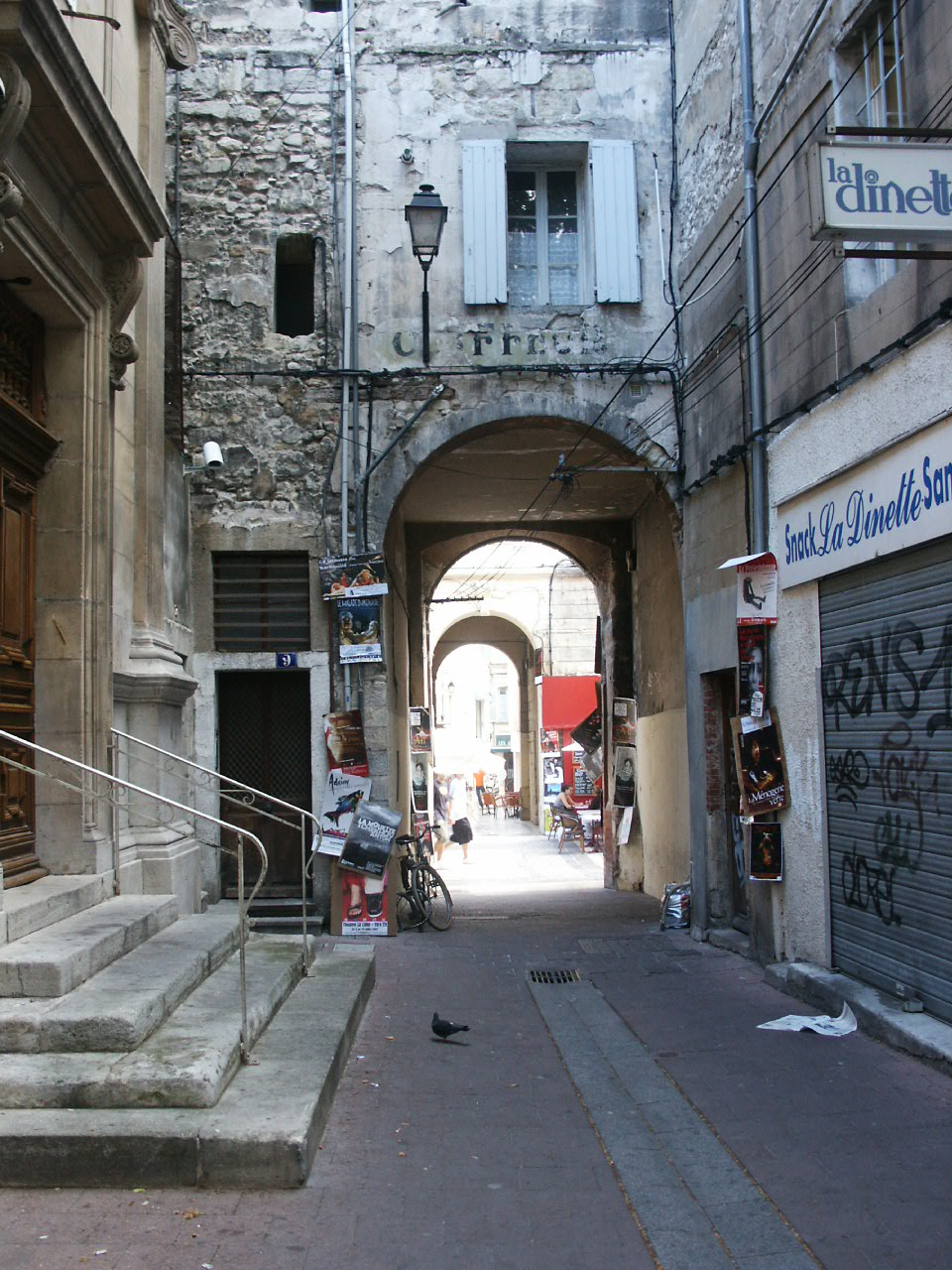
The entrance, called the "Port de la Calandre", to the Jewish Quarter in Avignon, France.

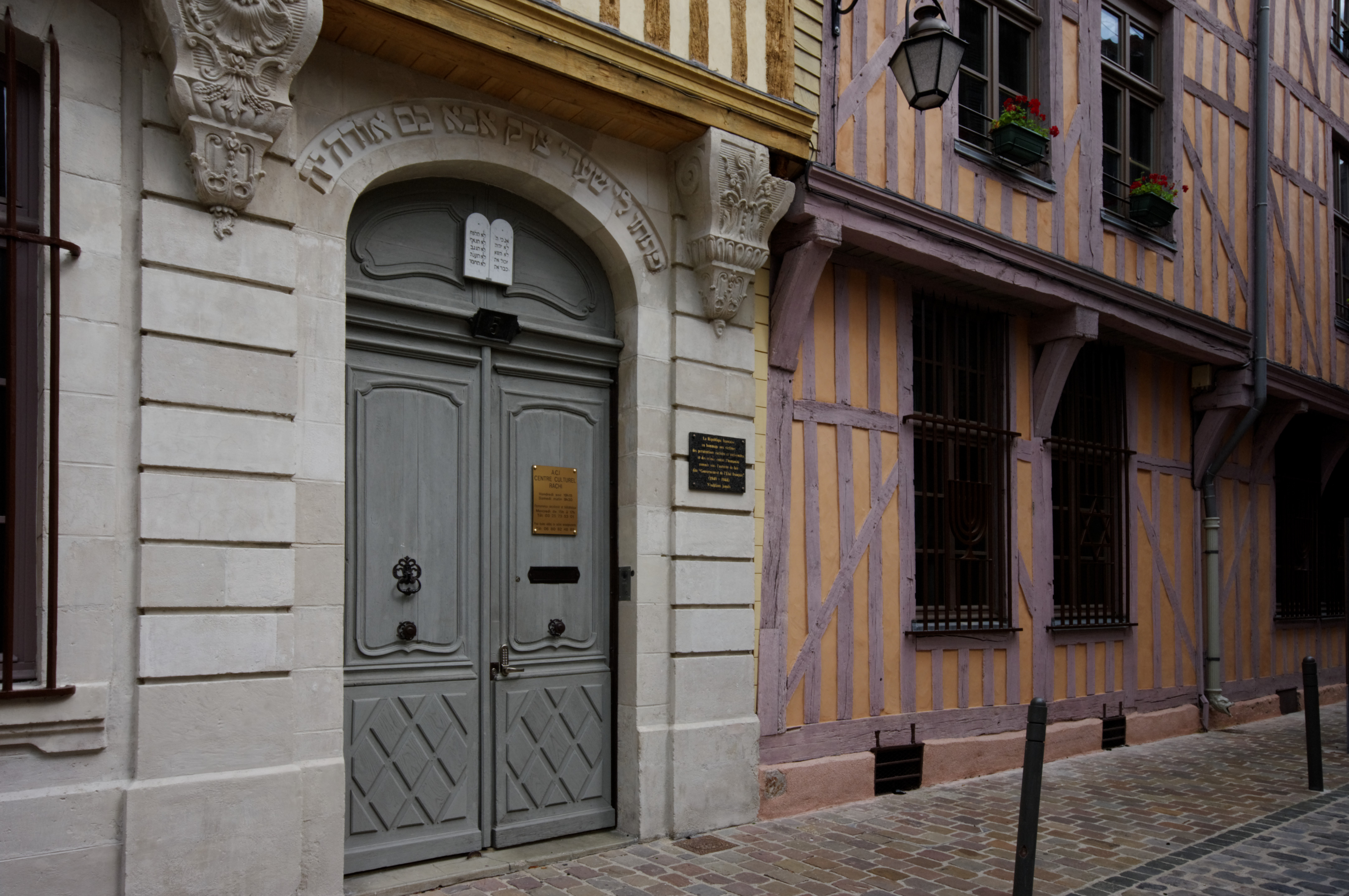
Synagogue in the Jewish Quarter of Troyes, France

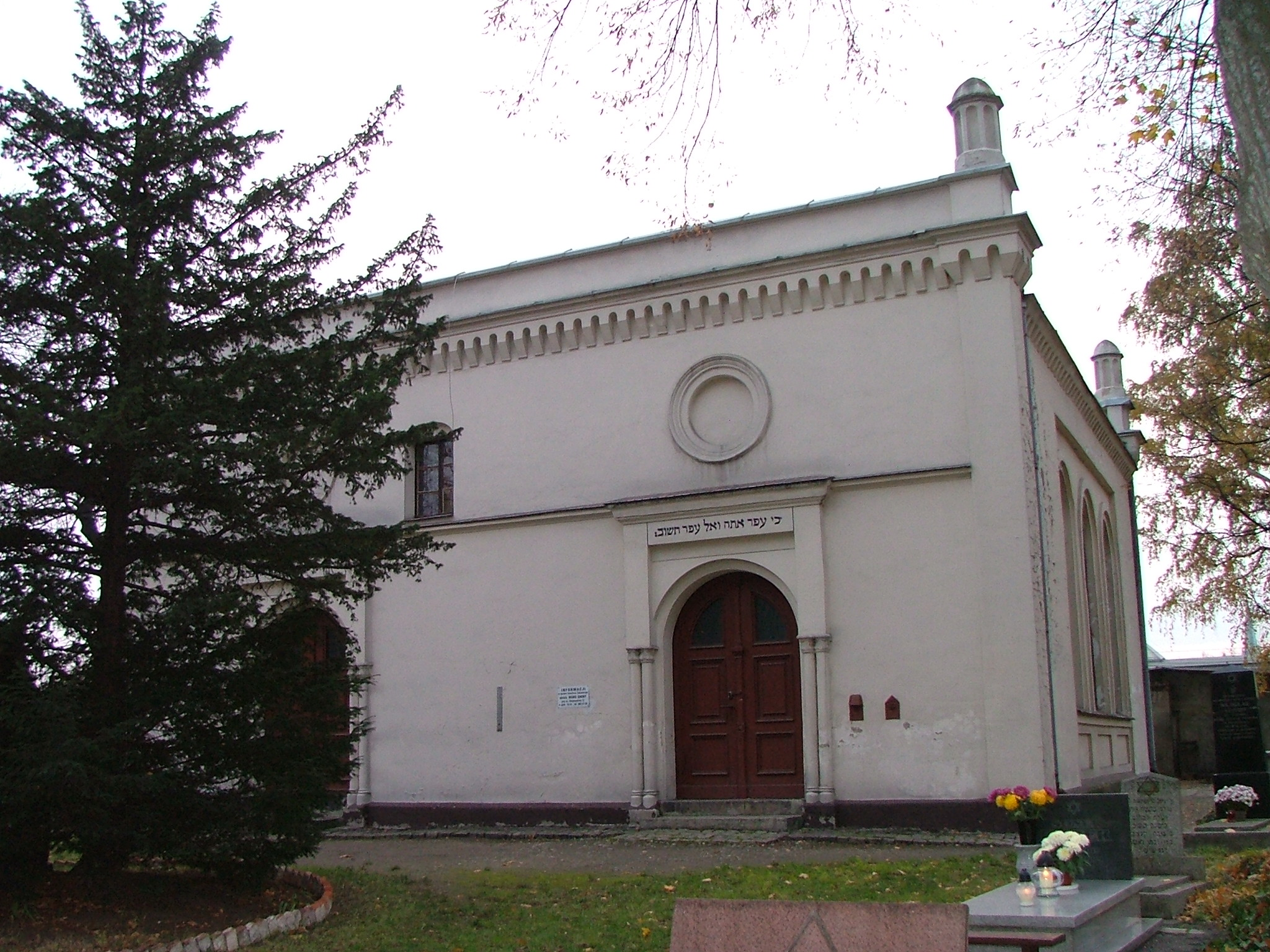
Jewish cemetery of Legnica, Poland

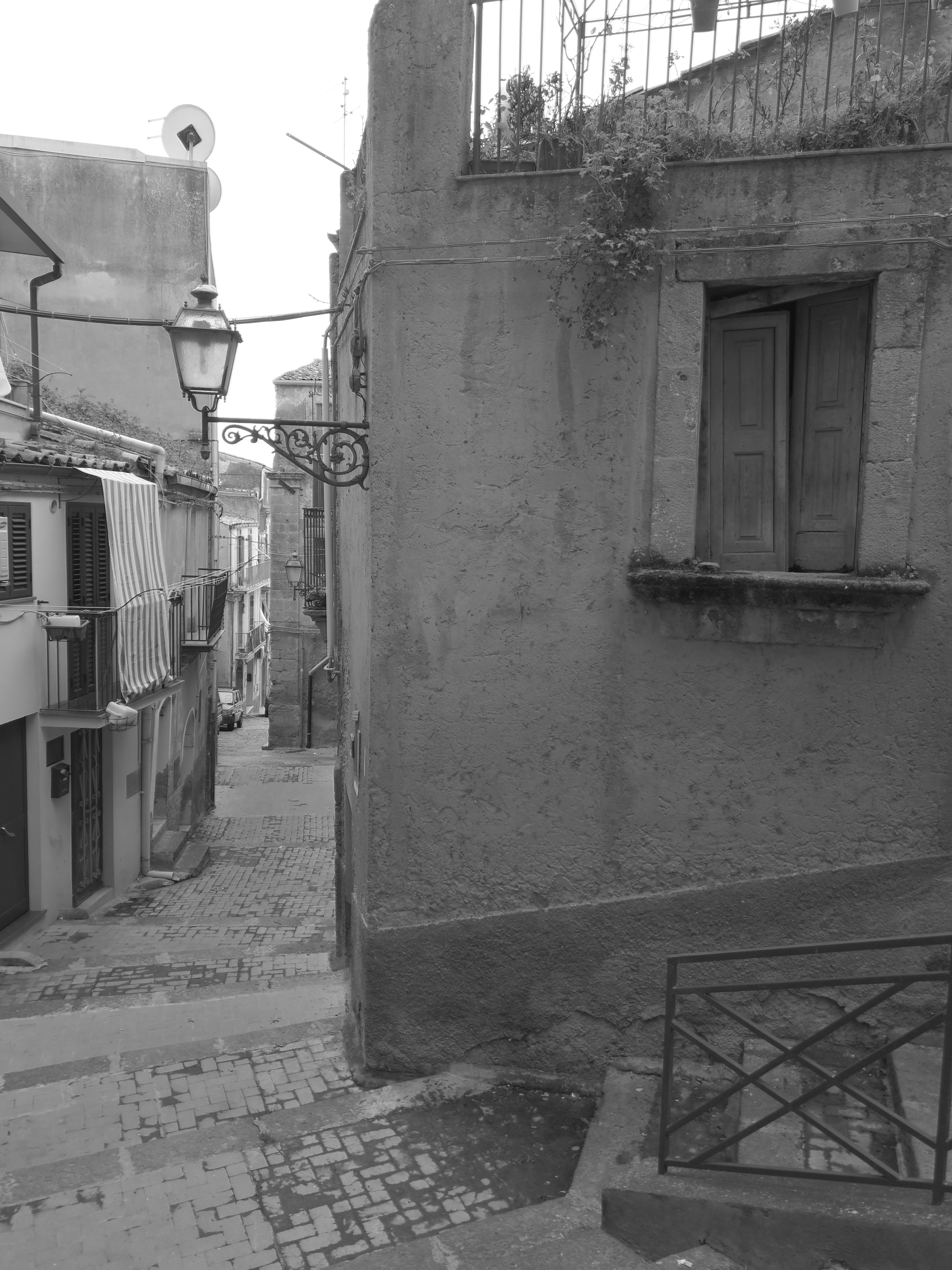
Jewish Quarter of Caltagirone, Italy

Jewish quarters in Europe existed for a number of reasons. In some cases, Christian authorities wished to segregate Jews from the Christian population so that Christians would not be "contaminated" by them or so as to put psychological pressure on Jews to convert to Christianity. From the Jewish point of view, concentration of Jews within a limited area offered a level of protection from outside influences or mob violence. In many cases, residents had their own justice system.

When political authorities designated an area where Jews were required by law to live, such areas were commonly referred to as ghettos, and were usually coupled with many other disabilities and indignities. The areas chosen usually consisted of the most undesirable areas of a city.

In the English city of Norwich, the Jewish quarter was close to the castle, as a source of protection in times of local pogroms. This pattern was seen in other English towns, where Jews were under the protection of the Normans.

In the 19th century, Jewish ghettos were progressively abolished, and their walls taken down, though some areas of Jewish concentration continued and continue to exist. In some cities, Jewish quarters refer to areas which historically had concentrations of Jews. For example, many maps of Spanish towns mark a "Jewish Quarter", though Spain hasn't had a significant Jewish population for over 500 years.

In Eastern Europe there were no Jewish quarters or ghettos. Jews lived in small towns known as shtetls.

Over the course of World War II, Nazi Germany reestablished Jewish ghettos in Nazi-occupied Europe (which they called Jewish quarters) for the purpose of segregation, persecution, terror, and exploitation of Jews, mostly in Eastern Europe. According to USHMM archives, "The Germans established at least 1,000 ghettos in German-occupied and annexed Poland and the Soviet Union alone."

Austria

- Hohenems: Jewish Quarter
- Salzburg: Judengasse
- Vienna: Judenplatz (1280-1421); Leopoldstadt

Belgium

- Antwerp: Joods Antwerpen (35,000 Jews before 1940, 15,000 nowadays)

Czech Republic

- Kolín: Jewish Quarter
- Prague: Josefov
- Třebíč: Jewish Quarter of Třebíč

France

- Bordeaux: Saint-Seurin
- Draguignan: Juiverie de Draguignan
- Lyon: La Juiverie de Fourvière (rue Juiverie) and La Guillotière
- Marseille: La Carrière-des-Juifs and Mont-Juif or Montjusieu
- Paris: the Pletzl in Le Marais district
- Les Josiols is a former Jewish quarter situated north of Mirabel-aux-Baronnies

Germany

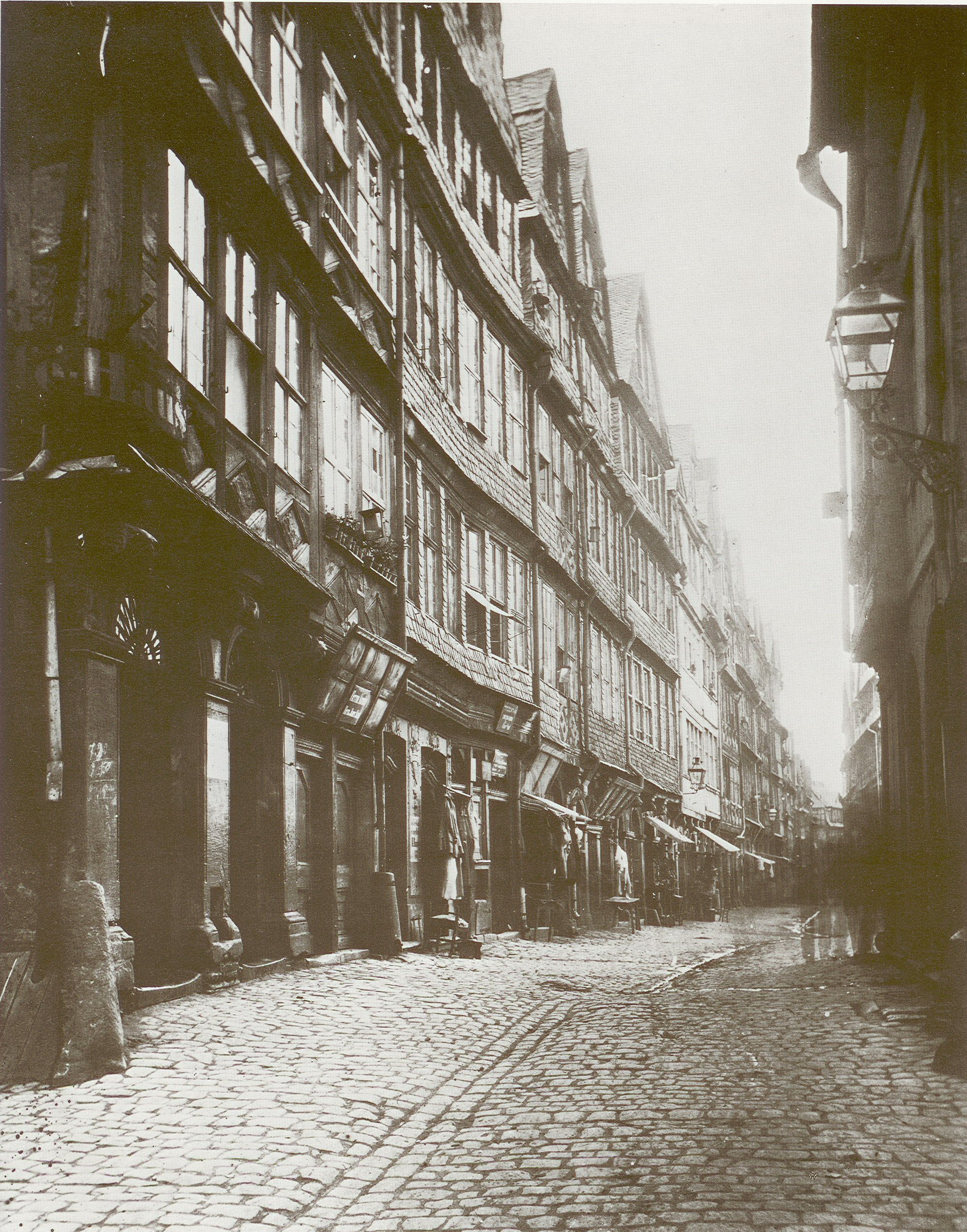
The Judengasse, Frankfurt in 1868

- Berlin: Judengasse and the Bayerisches Viertel
- Cologne: Judengasse
- Frankfurt: Judengasse
- Hamburg: New Town, Grindel, and Eimsbüttel (History of the Jews in Hamburg)
- Hanau: Nordstraße
- Koblenz: Koblenz
- Leipzig: Brühl)
- Speyer: Jewish community of Speyer
- Stuttgart: Judengasse
- Trier: Judengasse
- Worms

Greece

- Rhodes: La Juderia

Hungary

- Budapest: Erzsébetváros

Ireland

- Cork: "Jewtown" around Albert Road
- Dublin: Portobello

Italy

- Caltagirone: Iudeca (Giudecca)
- Catania: Judeca Suprana, Judeca Suttana and Piano di Giacobbe
- Enna: Iudeca (Giudecca)
- Florence: Florentine Ghetto
- Mantua: Mantuan Ghetto
- Messina: Tirone and Paraporto
- Naples: Giudecca
- Padua: Paduan Ghetto
- Palermo: Meschita and Guzzetta
- Reggio Calabria: La Judeca (Giudecca)
- Rome: Roman Ghetto
- Syracuse — La Jureca (Giudecca)
- Venice: Venetian Ghetto
- Ferrara: Ghetto di Ferrara

Netherlands

- Amsterdam: Jodenbuurt; Jodenbreestraat (until World War II); Buitenveldert (contemporary)
- The Hague: Jodenbuurt (The Hague)

Poland

- Kraków: Kazimierz
- Warsaw: Muranów (during World War II, the Warsaw Ghetto)

Portugal

- Belmonte: Judiaria
- Braga: Judiaria Velha (Rua do Poço) and Judiaria Nova (Rua de Sto. António das Travessas)
- Castelo de Vide: Judiaria
- Coimbra: Judiaria Velha and Judiaria Nova (Fonte dos Judeus)
- Lisbon: Alfama and Judiaria
- Porto: Judiaria Velha, Judiaria Nova do Olival and Bairro de Monchique
- Tomar: Judiaria

Romania

- Bucharest: Văcăreşti/Dudeşti

Spain

- Ávila — Judería
- Barcelona — El Call
- Bellpuig — Call
- Besalú — Call
- Caceres — Judería
- Calahorra — Judería
- Córdoba — Judería
- Estella-Lizarra — Judería
- Girona — Call Jueu de Girona
- Hervás — Judería
- Jaén — Judería
- León — Judería
- Monforte de Lemos — Judería
- Oviedo — Judería
- Palma de Mallorca — Call
- Mallorca – Call Jueu d'Inca
- Plasencia — Judería
- Ribadavia — Judería
- Segovia — Aljama
- Sevilla — Judería
- Sos del Rey Católico — Judería
- Tarazona — Aljama
- Toledo
- Tortosa — Call
- Tudela — Judería
- Valladolid — Aljama

Turkey

- European Istanbul: Balat

United Kingdom

- City of London: Old Jewry
- Winchester: Jewry Street

== Africa ==
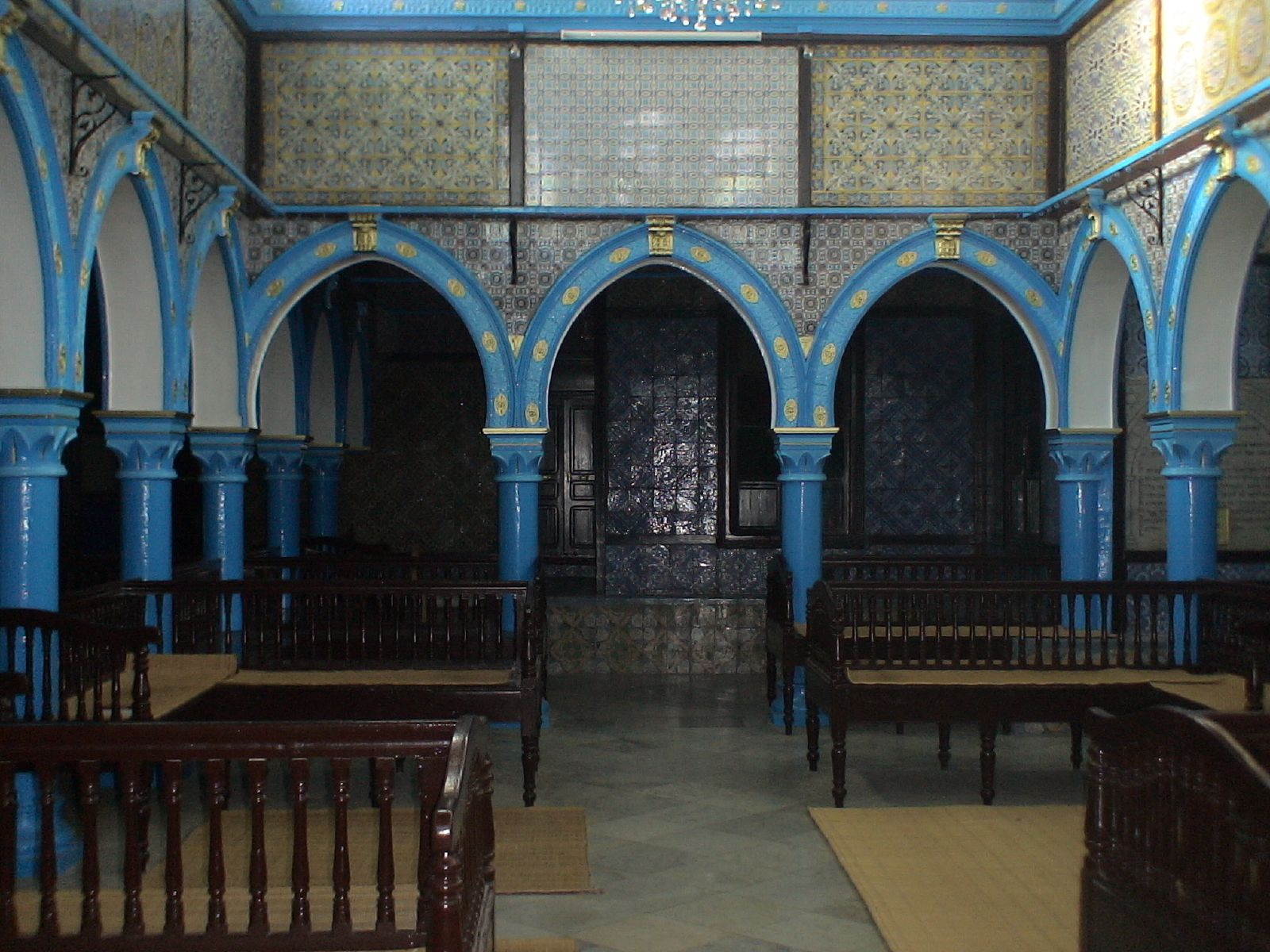
El Ghriba, Djerba island, Tunisia.

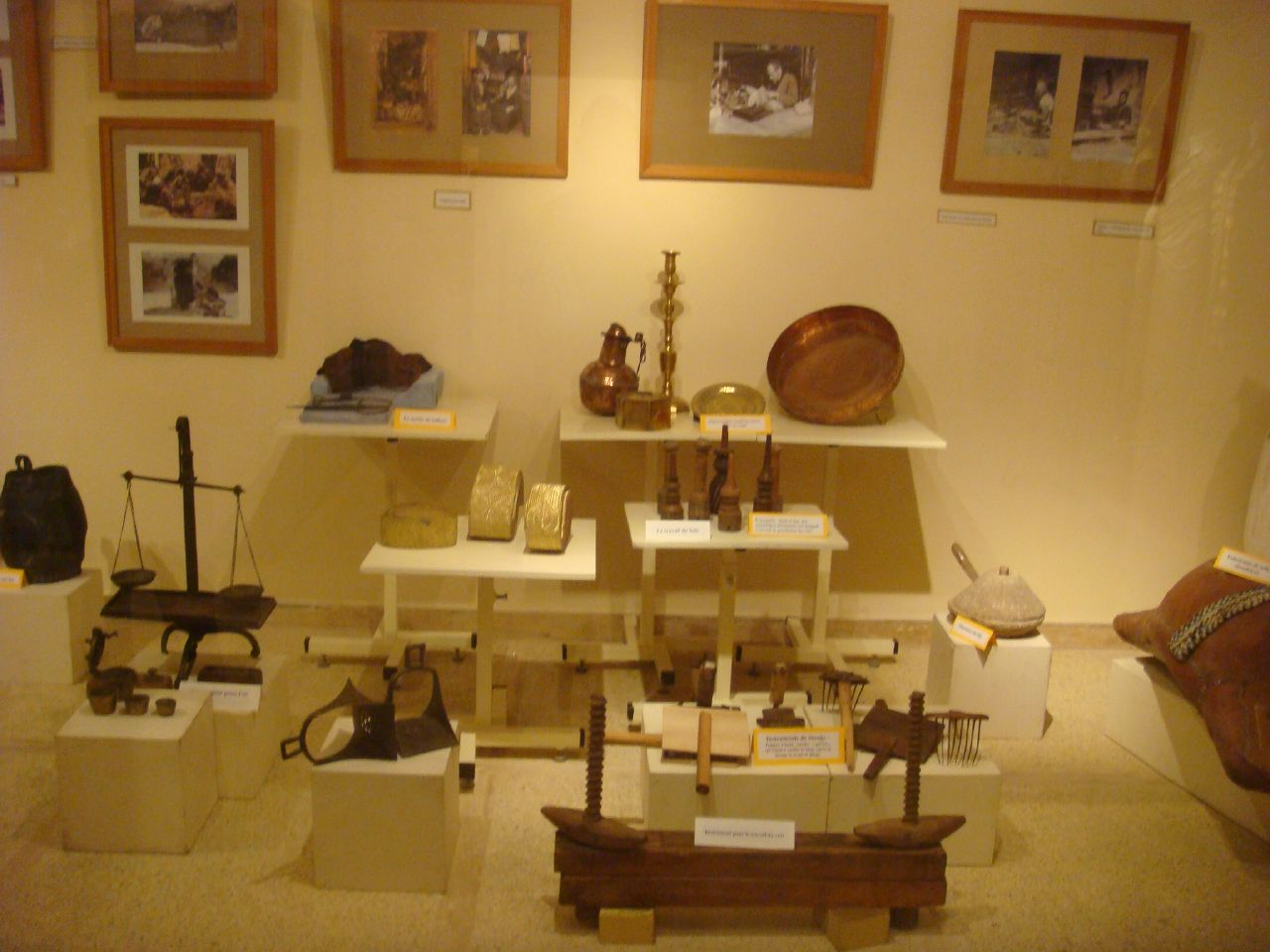
Artifacts from the Jewish Quarter, Casablanca, Morocco.

Algeria

- Algiers — Hara
- Béjaïa — Karamane
- Constantine — Hara
- Ghardaia — Mellah
- Oran — Derb
- Tlemcen — Derb Lihoud

Egypt

- Cairo — Harat Al-Yahud Al-Qara’In and Harat Al-Yahud

Libya

- Tripoli — Hara Kabira, Hara Sghira, Hara al Wastia

Morocco

- Azemmour — Mellah of Azemmour
- Casablanca — Mellah of Casablanca
- Chefchaouen — Mellah of Chefchaouen
- Essaouira — Mellah of Essaouira
- Fez — Mellah of Fez
- Larache — Mellah of Larache
- Marrakesh — Mellah of Marrakesh
- Meknes — Old Mellah, New Mellah
- Rabat — Mellah of Rabat
- Sefrou — Mellah of Sefrou
- Tangier
- Tetouan - Mellah of Tetouan

Tunisia

- Djerba island — Hara Kebira, Hara Sghira
- El Kef — Hara
- Tunis — Hara
- Zarzis — Hara

== Asia ==
China

- Shanghai — Shanghai Ghetto, a temporary Jewish refuge during World War II.

India

- Kochi – Jew Town, traditional Cochin Jewish district and location of the spice market.

Lebanon

- Beirut — Wadi Abu Jamil, formerly known as Wadi al-Yahoud (meaning "Valley of the Jews").
- Sidon — Ḥarat al-Yahūd

Turkey

- Bursa — Kuruçeşme
- Asian Istanbul — Kuzguncuk
- İzmir — Karataş

Iran

- Isfahan — Jouybareh
- Shiraz — Mahalleh
- Tehran — Sarchal or Oudlajan

Iraq

- Baghdad — History of the Jews in Baghdad, Bataween, Shorja
- There are several places called "Jewlakan" (literally meaning "the Jews" in Kurdish), e.g., in Sulaymaniyah or Erbil.

Syria

- Aleppo – Bahsita and Jamiliyya
- Damascus – Ḥārat al-Yahūd, a recently restored tourist destination popular among Europeans before the outbreak of the Syrian civil war where vacationers can stay in the neighborhood and beautified former homes of the completely vanished ancient Jewish community.

Uzbekistan

- Bukhara – Jewish Quarter or Jewish Mahalla
- Samarkand – Old Jewish Quarter or Jewish Mahalla

Yemen

- Sanaa – Qa' Al-Yahud

== Americas ==
Argentina

- Buenos Aires — Once

Brazil

- São Paulo — Bom Retiro, Higienópolis

United States

- Boca Raton, Florida – There are over 175,000 Jewish people in southern Palm Beach County.
- New York City – Williamsburg and Crown Heights in Brooklyn, (historically) the Lower East Side and parts of The Bronx. Northern New Jersey, Long Island, and Rockland County have been home to large Jewish populations since the 1940s and 1950s.
- Pinch District, Memphis, Tennessee — From the 1890s to the 1930s, it was the center of Memphis' Jewish community, with many synagogues and Jewish-owned businesses.
- Pittsburgh – Squirrel Hill, with some spillover into bordering Greenfield, Regent Square, and Shadyside.

Uruguay

- Montevideo — Villa Muñoz

Canada

- Montréal, Québec – Mile-End/Outremont and Côte-des-Neiges/Hampstead/Snowdon, Côte-Saint-Luc, Saint-Laurent Boulevard
- Toronto – The Ward was the original Jewish district in the 19th century followed by Kensington Market in the early to mid 20th century.
