= Castelo de Vide =

- Municipality
- Notable Town of Castelo de Vide
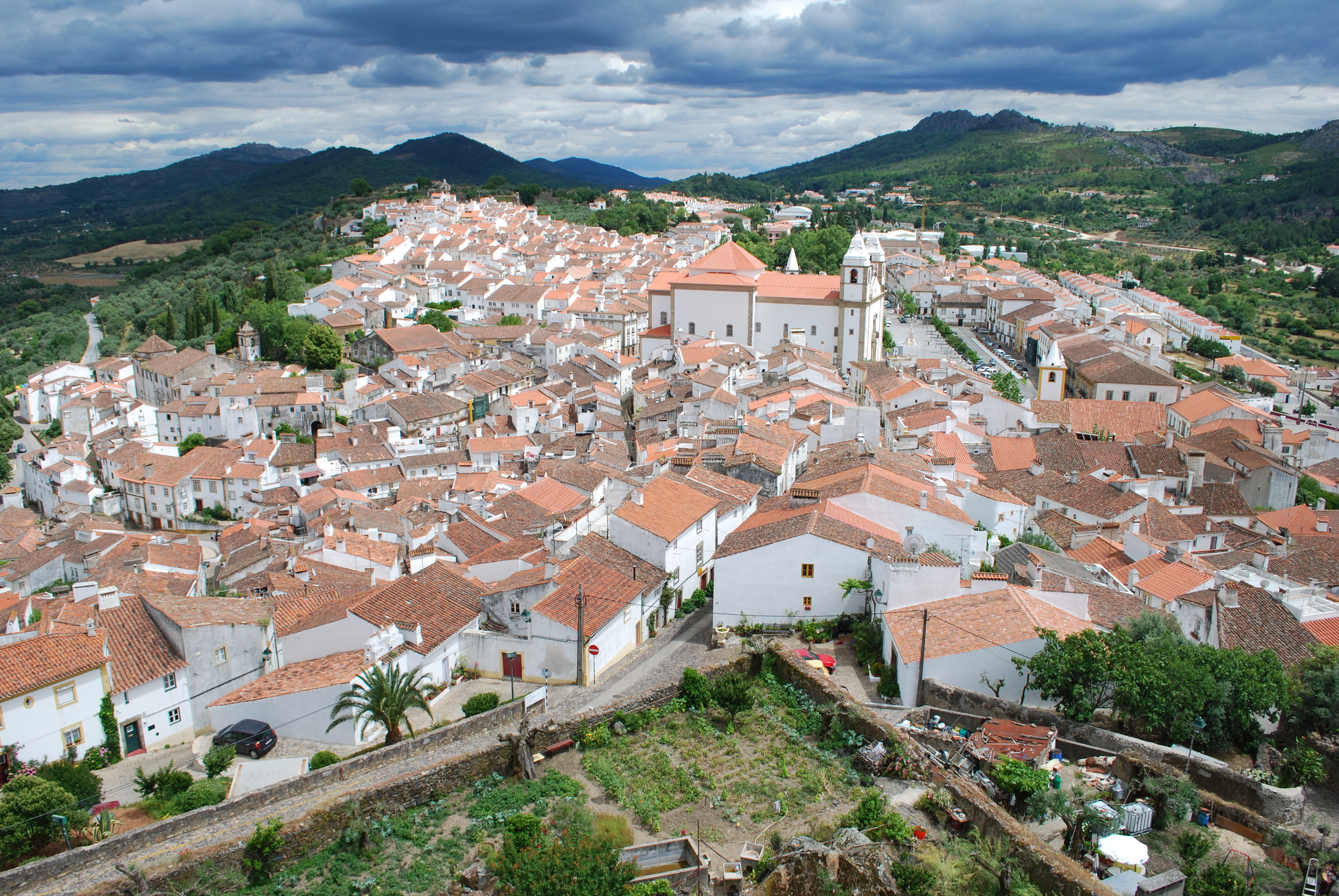
- A view of the hilttop seat of the municipality of Castelo de Vide

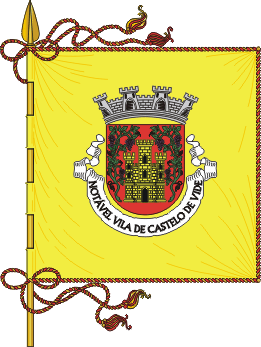
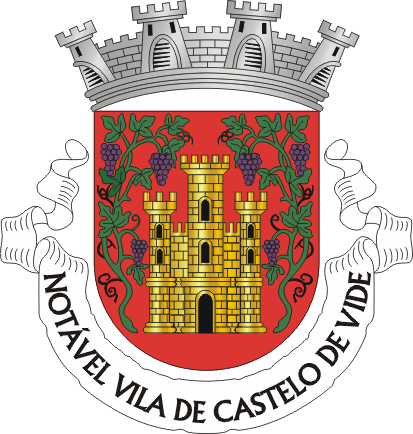
- Flag Coat of arms
- Interactive map of Castelo de Vide
- Location in Portugal
- Coordinates: 39°20′N 7°31′W
- Country: Portugal
- Region: Alentejo
- Intermunic. comm.: Alto Alentejo
- District: Portalegre
- Parishes: 4

Government
  - President: António Ribeiro (PSD)

Area
  - Total: 264.91 km^{2} (102.28 sq mi)

Population (2011)
  - Total: 3,407
  - Density: 12.86/km^{2} (33.31/sq mi)
- Time zone: UTC+00:00 (WET)
  - Summer (DST): UTC+01:00 (WEST)
- Local holiday: Easter Monday date varies
- Website: www.cm-castelo-vide.pt

Castelo de Vide, (Note: European Portuguese pronunciation: [kɐʃˈtɛlu ðɨ ˈvidɨ]) officially the Notable Town of Castelo de Vide, is a municipality in Portugal, with a population of 3,407 inhabitants in 2011, in an area of 264.91 square kilometres (102.28 mi^{2}).

== History ==
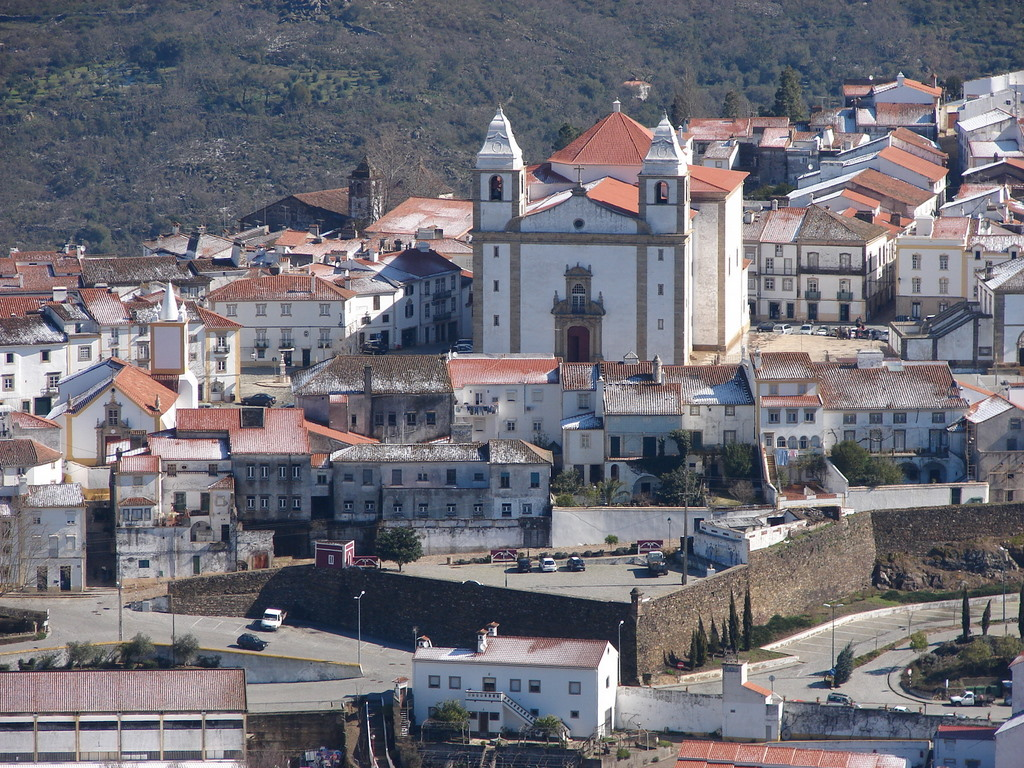
A view of the church of Santa Maria da Devesa

It is unclear when humans settled Castelo de Vide, although archaeologists suggest the decision came from the morphology of the soil and from a territorial strategy to occupy and conquer land. There is evidence of settlement in the Neolithic era, with several megalithic sites in the area, such as the Anta do Sobral. The establishment of a fortification helped fix a new population to the territory and, at the same, functioned as a strategic border fortress. Castelo de Vide became its own municipality in 1276, before which it was part of Marvão.

In 1299 Rui de Pina wrote that Castelo de Vide remained a weak stronghold, stating "lugar etã mais chão q forte" (the locality is more place then strong). Afonso Sanches, son of king Afonso III, rebuilt the fortification walls, and his brother King Denis continued the task, with work completed during the reign of King Afonso IV sometime in the 14th century. These changes improved the stronghold's defensive conditions, including moving a well into the interior and a new line of walls protecting the citadel and houses previously outside the walls. A tower keep was constructed flush with the southern walls in order to better defend the southern passage. All these improvements proved useful during Portugal's conflicts with Castile, when siege engines were used.

Throughout the 14th century the settlement slowly expanded outside the castle walls. The southern flanks, with good southerly exposure and a gentle slope, allowed easy settlement, while the northern and western exposures expanded later due to wind and steep cliff faces. The growth of the settlement occurred along the main road leading to the castle, and followed the expansion of religious buildings outside the walls. This road bisected two sides of the hill and one side was occupied by a Jewish quarter inhabited by Jews expelled from Castile and Aragon.

Written documents attest to the existence of Castelo de Vide's Jewish community and quarter throughout the 14th and 15th centuries. The 14th-century Synagogue of Castelo de Vide in Santa Maria da Devesa still stands, and despite Portugal's expulsion of Jews in 1496 was used by Marranos as a religious sanctuary and school until the 16th century. Today it houses a small museum dedicated to Castelo de Vide's historical Jewish community.

Many of the perceptions of the town came from the 16th century drawings of Duarte d'Armas. At that time the settlement was dedicated to agriculture (cultivation of wine grapes, cotton, olives, fruits, and cereals) and raising cattle, while watermills were constructed along the ravines in Vide and Nisa. At the beginning of the 16th century, toward the end of King John III's reign, the wool industry became important in the region. This resulted in Castelo de Vide's inhabitants being referred to as Cardadores ("carders"). Castelo de Vide had 885 inhabitants in 1527, rising to 1,400 by 1572 and 1,600 by 1603; this population growth resulted from growth in agricultural production, the textile industry, and commerce with Spain.

The new foral ("charter"), issued by King Manuel I in 1512 established new laws for public spaces and set the town's boundaries.

== Geography ==
The municipality is located by the Serra de São Mamede in Portalegre District.

Population of Castelo de Vide Municipality (1801 – 2011)
1801	1849	1900	1930	1960	1981	1991	2001	2011
7 006	6 031	6 614	6 837	6 538	4 187	4 145	3 872	3 407

Administratively, the municipality is divided into 4 civil parishes (freguesias):

- Nossa Senhora da Graça de Póvoa e Meadas
- Santa Maria da Devesa
- Santiago Maior
- São João Baptista

=== Climate ===
Climate data for Castelo de Vide, altitude: 552 m (1,811 ft)
Month	Jan	Feb	Mar	Apr	May	Jun	Jul	Aug	Sep	Oct	Nov	Dec	Year
Average precipitation mm (inches)	120 (4.7)	105 (4.1)	90 (3.5)	74 (2.9)	70 (2.8)	32 (1.3)	8 (0.3)	8 (0.3)	44 (1.7)	89 (3.5)	112 (4.4)	122 (4.8)	874 (34.3)
Source: Portuguese Environment Agency

== Notable people ==
- João de Casal (1641–1735), Bishop of Macau
- Garcia de Orta (ca.1501 – 1568) a Portuguese Renaissance Sephardi Jewish physician, herbalist and naturalist; a pioneer of tropical medicine, pharmacognosy and ethnobotany, working mainly in Goa
- Mouzinho da Silveira (1780–1849) a statesman, jurist, Portuguese politician and an important player in the Liberal Revolution of 1820
- Salgueiro Maia (1944–1992) a captain in the Portuguese army, he made a significant contribution to the Carnation Revolution

== Gallery ==
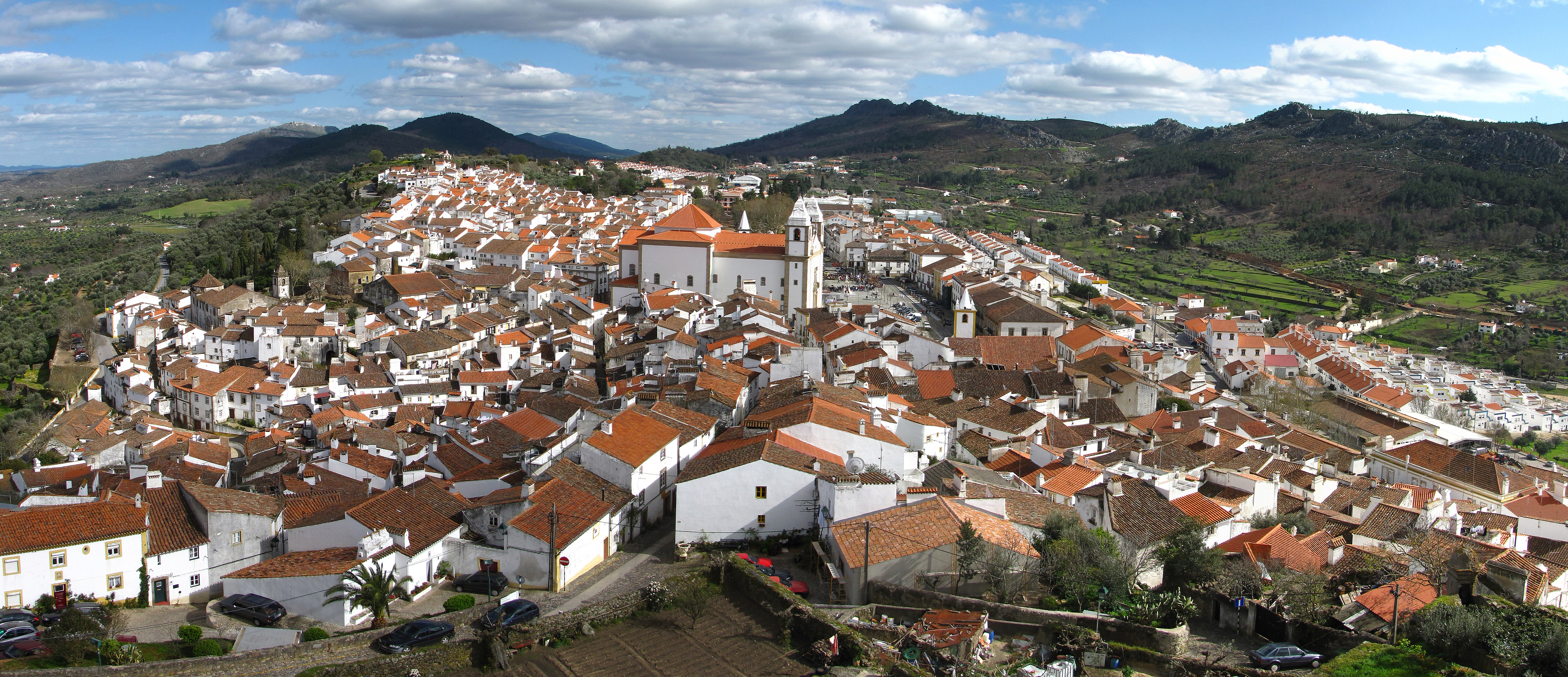
Panorama of Castelo de Vide

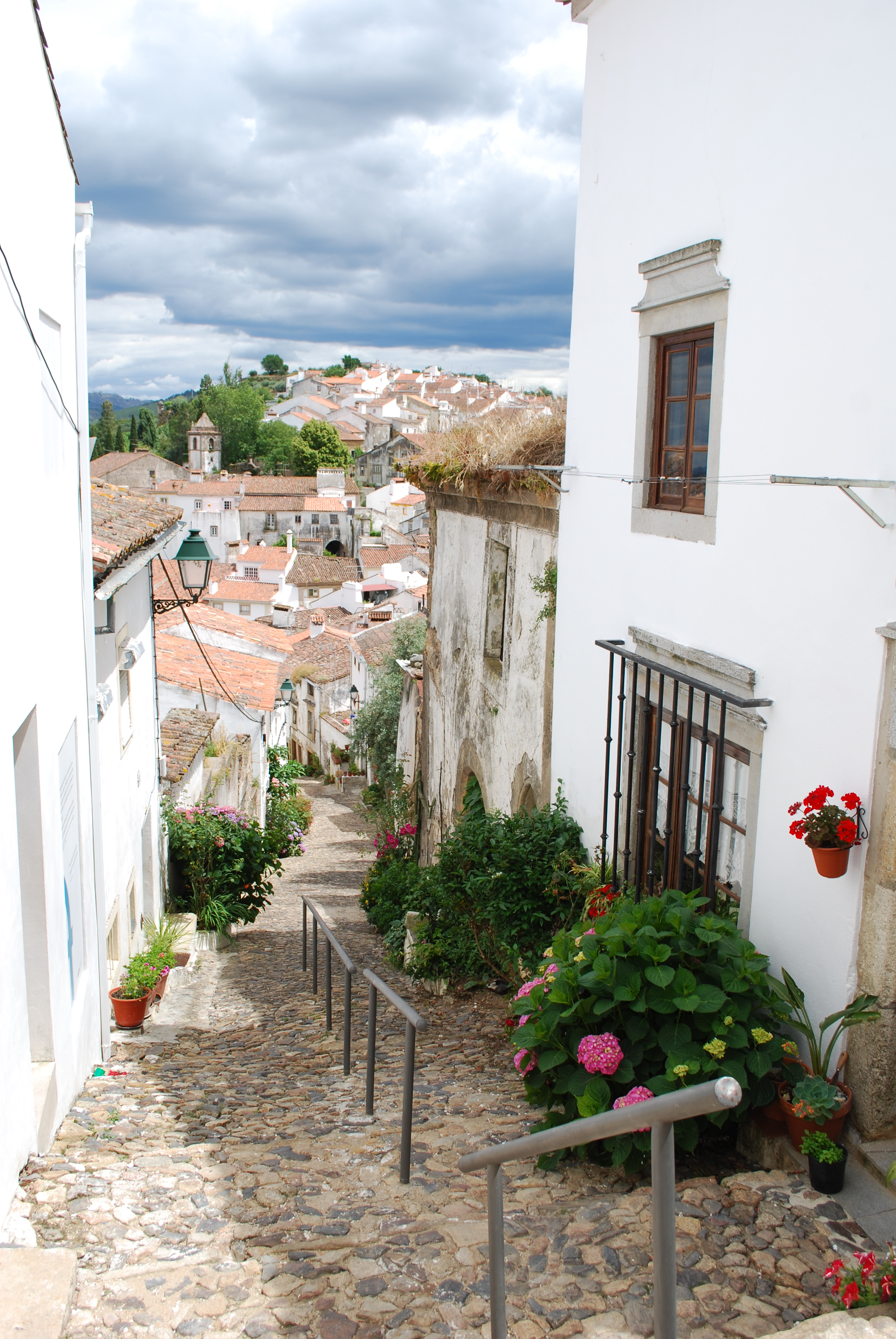
Old Jewish quarter of Castelo de Vide

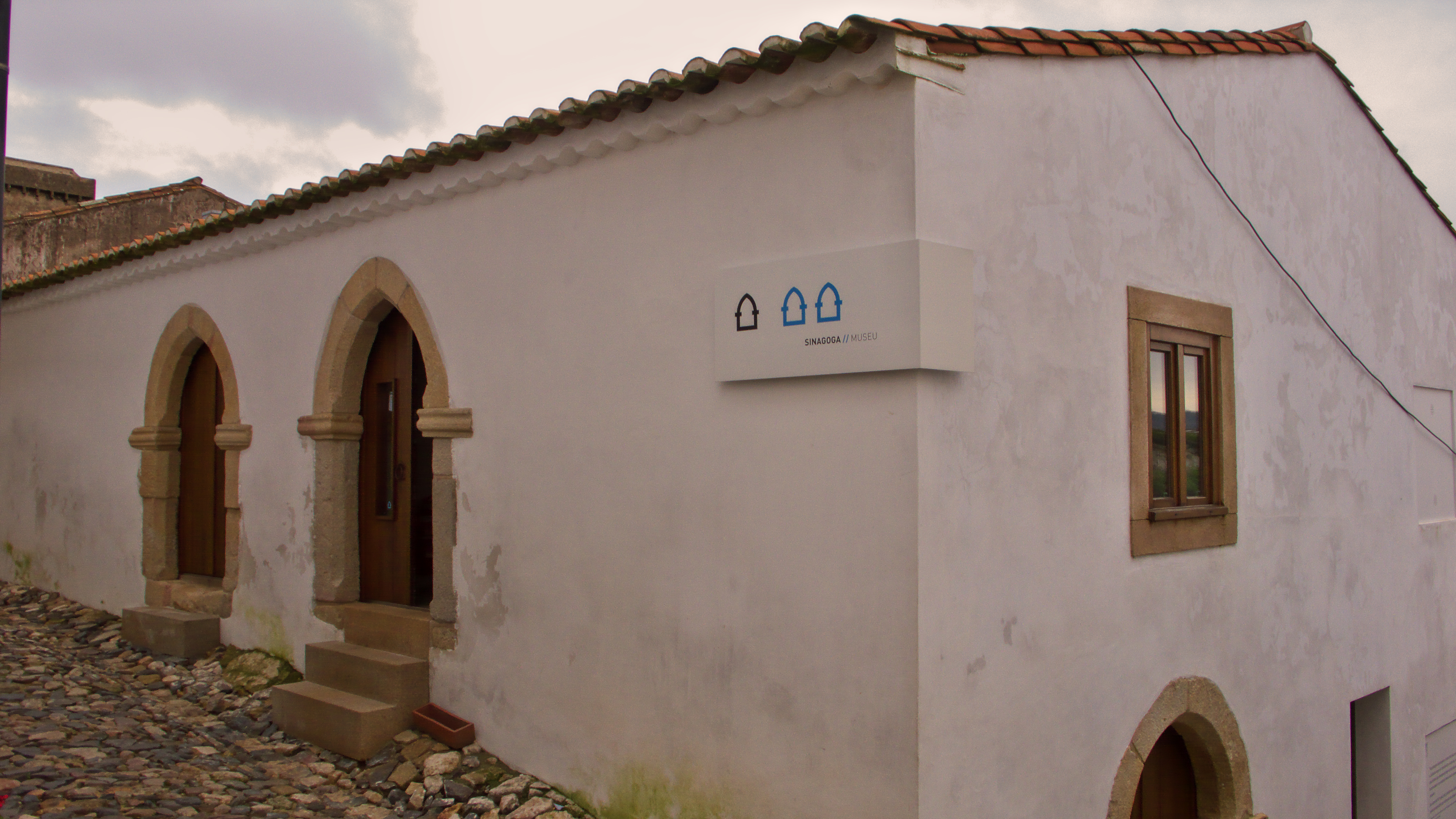
Synagogue of Castelo de Vide

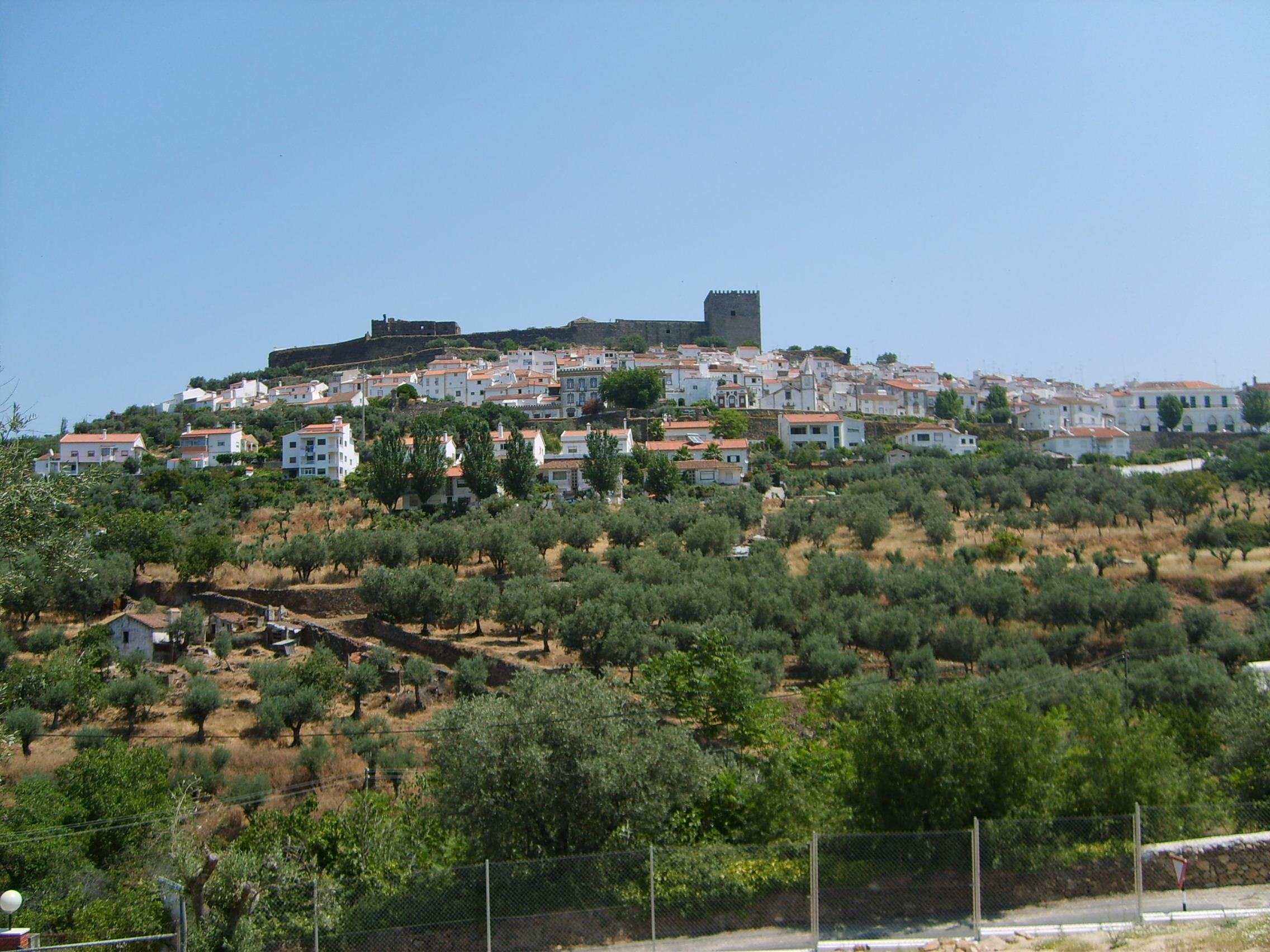
Castelo de Vide from afar
