= Anta do Sobral =

Neolithic dolmen in Portugal

- Anta da Nave do Grou
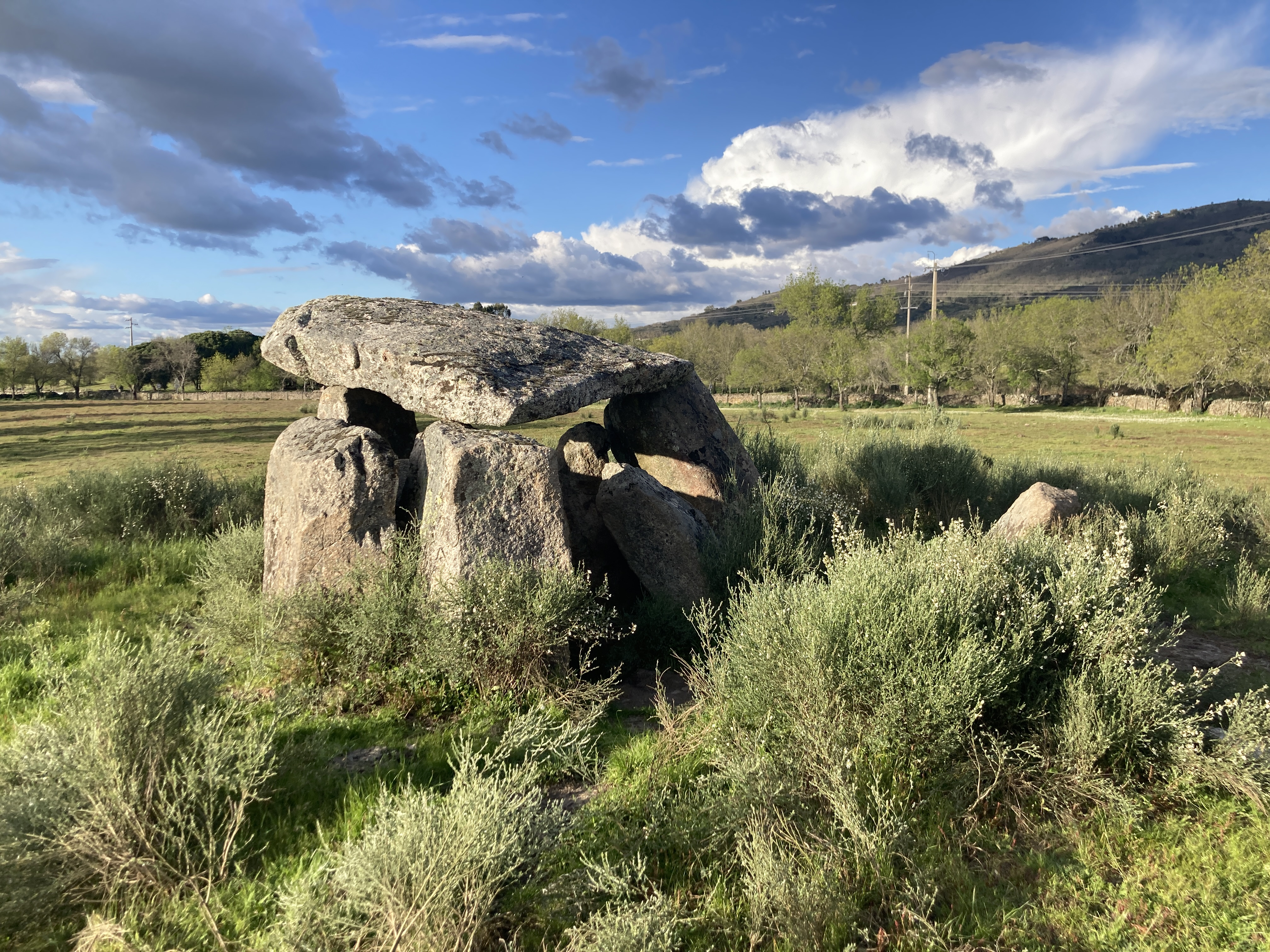
- The Anta de Sobral in 2025
- Interactive map of Anta do Sobral
- 39°24′0.6″N 7°29′26.6″W
- Type: Dolmen or burial chamber
- Periods: Late Neolithic; Chalcolithic
- Location: Castelo de Vide, Portalegre District, Portugal

History
- Built: c. 3500 BCE

Site notes
- Height: 1.8 m (5 ft 11 in)
- Length: 3.2 m (10 ft)
- Width: 2.4 m (7 ft 10 in)
- Excavation dates: 1986; 2010
- Discovered: 1867
- Condition: Good; capstone repositioned in 1992
- Public access: Yes, but on private land

The Anta do Sobral (also known as the Anta da Nave do Grou), is a megalithic dolmen, or burial chamber, located in the parish of São João Baptista in the municipality of Castelo de Vide in the Portalegre District to the east of Portugal. It is believed to have been constructed in the Late-Neolithic period.

== Description ==
Situated approximately 3.5 km southwest of Castelo de Vide, on private property but open to the public, the dolmen consists of an irregular polygonal burial chamber with a base measuring approximately 3.20 metres by 2.40 metres and a height of 1.80 metres. It is formed by seven, slightly conical, granite upright stones or orthostats, which are all still preserved in situ. The stones are often as thick as they are wide, and are placed very close together, giving it a unique appearance in comparison with other similar structures in Portugal. The capstone, which collapsed during earlier excavations, was re-positioned in 1992. The dolmen would have originally been covered with a burial mound or tumulus with a diameter of about 25 metres, but this is now barely discernible. While many similar structures had an entrance corridor, no evidence of such a structure has been found at this site.

== Excavation ==
The site was investigated and published by Pereira da Costa in 1867–1868. It was registered and protected as a National Monument in 1910. During surveys conducted in 1986 and 2010, the dolmen was catalogued and photographically documented. Under the guidance of the archaeologist, Jorge de Oliveira, in partnership with the Castelo de Vide Municipal Council, the capstone was repositioned in May 1992. A modern archaeological re-examination of the site was still pending in 2026. Although no extensive preservation measures have yet been carried out, the dolmen is among the better-preserved megalithic monuments in the region. Few artifacts have been found at the site to date. During the excavation, only a stone axe and a clay spoon were recovered. The lack of artifacts has limited the ability to accurately date the dolmen, which is believed to have been built during the Late-Neolithic period.
