= Synagogue of Castelo de Vide =

Former synagogue, now museum, in Portugal

- Portuguese: Sinagoga de Castelo de Vide
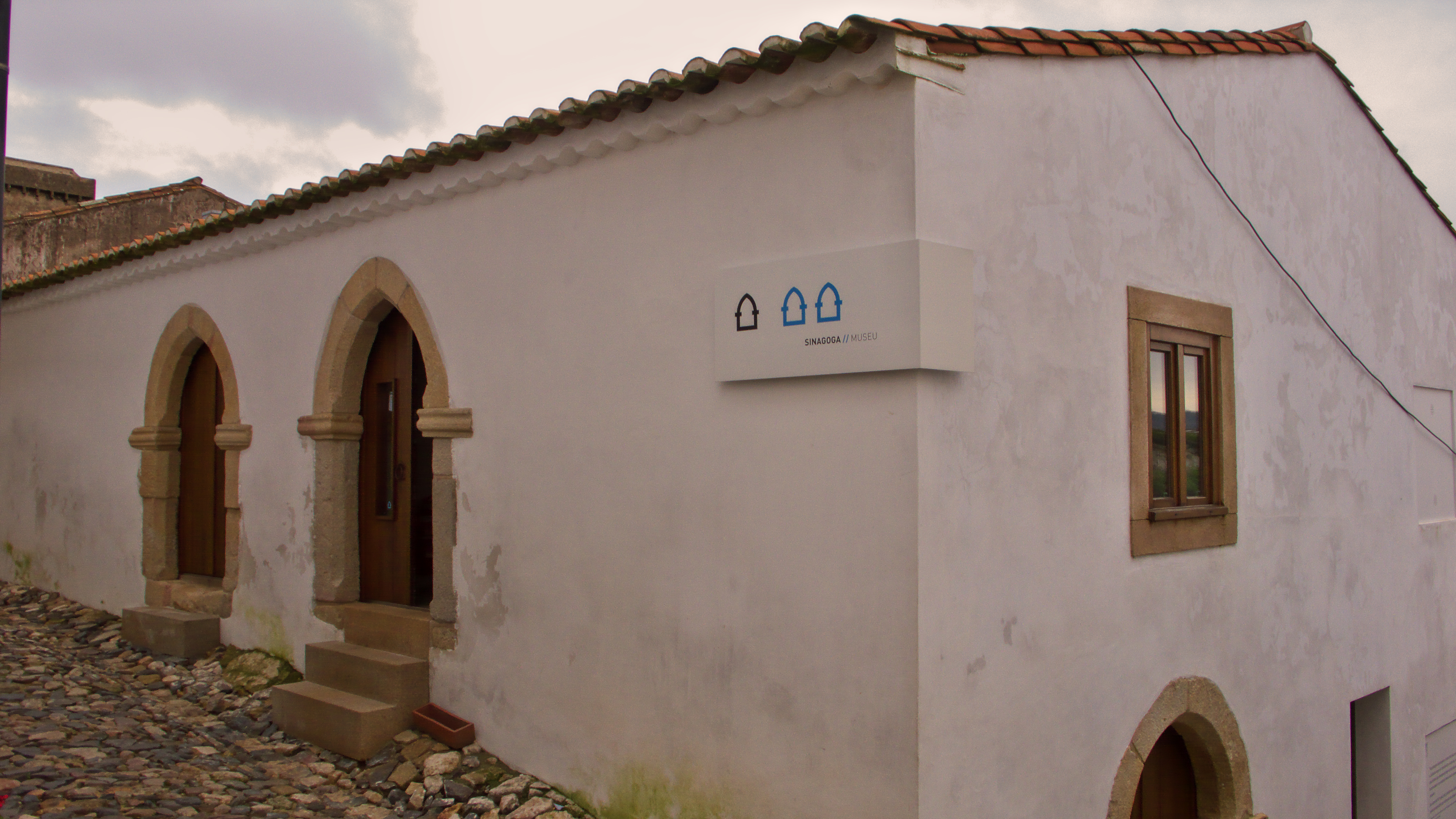
- Exterior of the former synagogue, now museum, in 2010

- Location of the former synagogue in Portugal

Religion
- Affiliation: Judaism (former)
- Ecclesiastical or organizational status: Synagogue (14th century– ); Jewish museum (since 2019)
- Status: Inactive (as a synagogue); Repurposed

Location
- Location: Santa Maria da Devesa, Castelo de Vide, Alentejo Region
- Country: Portugal
- Interactive map of Synagogue of Castelo de Vide
- Coordinates: 39°25′03.1″N 7°27′24.3″W

Architecture
- Type: Synagogue architecture
- Style: Gothic
- Completed: 14th century

Website
- herancajudaica.pt (in Portuguese)

Portuguese National Monument

The Synagogue of Castelo de Vide (Portuguese: Sinagoga de Castelo de Vide) is a well-preserved medieval synagogue in Santa Maria da Devesa, Castelo de Vide, in the Alentejo Region of Portugal. Built in the late 14th century, the former synagogue was repurposed in April 2019 as a Jewish museum dedicated to Castelo de Vide's historical Jewish community.

Along with the Synagogue of Tomar, it is one of two existing pre-expulsion synagogues in the country.

== History ==
The Synagogue of Castelo de Vide was built sometime in the late 14th century. Written documents attest to the existence of Castelo de Vide's Jewish community and Jewish quarter throughout the 14th and 15th centuries. Though King Manuel I of Portugal ordered the forced conversion or expulsion of Portuguese Jews in 1496, Marranos continued using the synagogue as a religious sanctuary and school until the mid 16th century.

The Synagogue of Castelo de Vide is one of two existing preserved medieval synagogues in Portugal. The other is the Synagogue of Tomar. Four pre-expulsion synagogue buildings exist in neighboring Spain: Híjar Synagogue, the Synagogue of Santa María la Blanca and Synagogue of El Tránsito in Toledo, and Córdoba Synagogue. All other existing Portuguese synagogues were built after the Portuguese Inquisition ended in 1821.

Over the succeeding centuries the synagogue had various uses, including an 18th-century alteration into a private home. The building was restored and its tabernacle rediscovered in 1972. Since April 2019, the building has housed a small museum dedicated to Castelo de Vide's historical Jewish community. The structure is listed as a Building of Public Interest (Imóvel de Interesse Público) by the Portuguese government.

== Architecture ==
The synagogue is a small two-story building originally constructed in the late 14th century and altered over time. It is oriented east–west. Ogival stone arches frame all of the building's doors. A mezuzah containing part of the Shema Yisrael prayer is placed over one of the ground floor doors.

Inside the building exists a 15th-century carved stone Torah ark or tabernacle (referred to as a hekhal by Sephardic communities) which was rediscovered in 1972 during repairs to the exterior walls. The ark's left scripture pedestal is decorated with seven balls symbolizing the six days of creation and one day of rest.

== Gallery ==
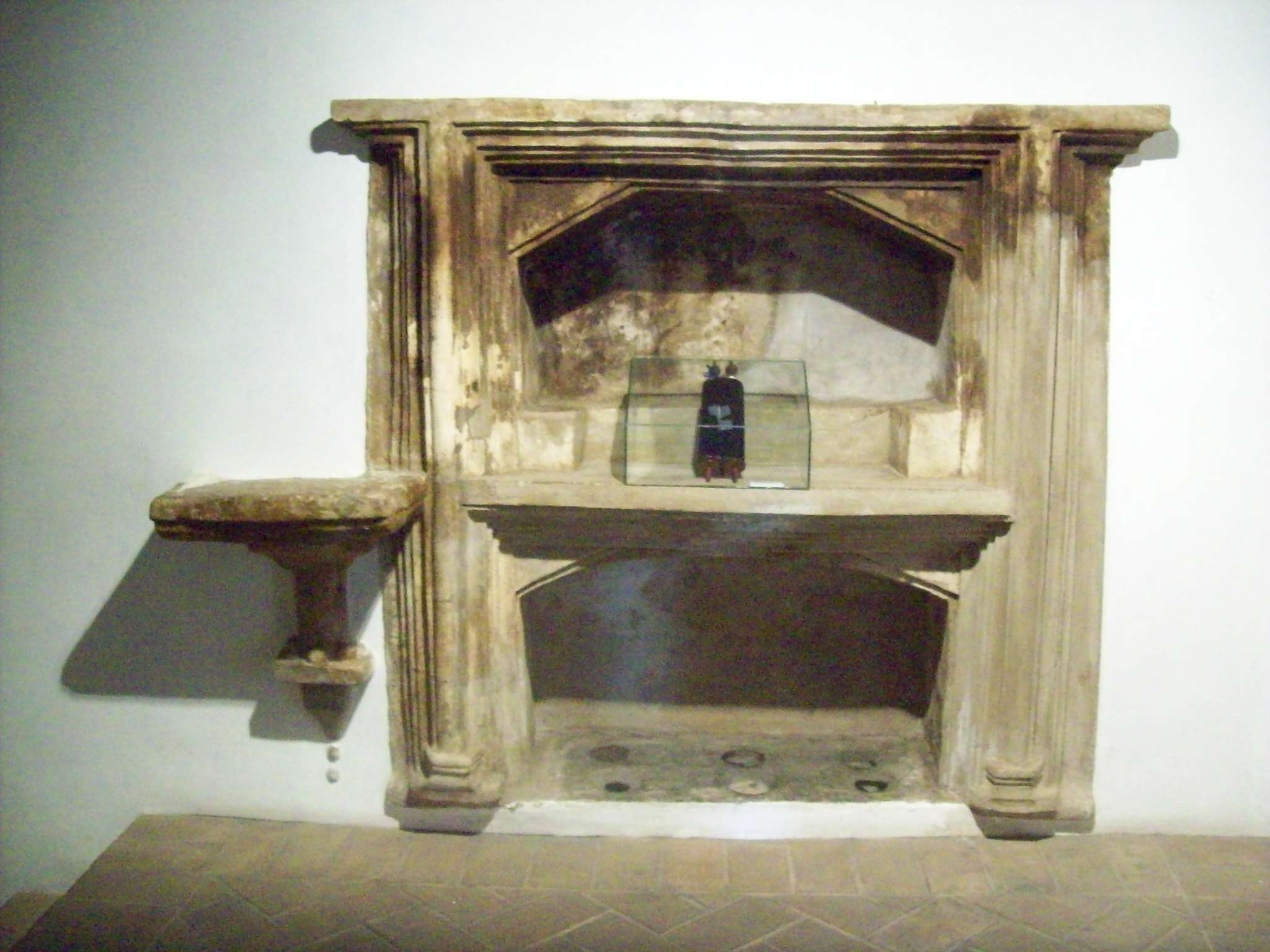
15th century Torah ark

== See also ==
- History of the Jews in Portugal
- List of synagogues in Portugal
