= Les Josiols =

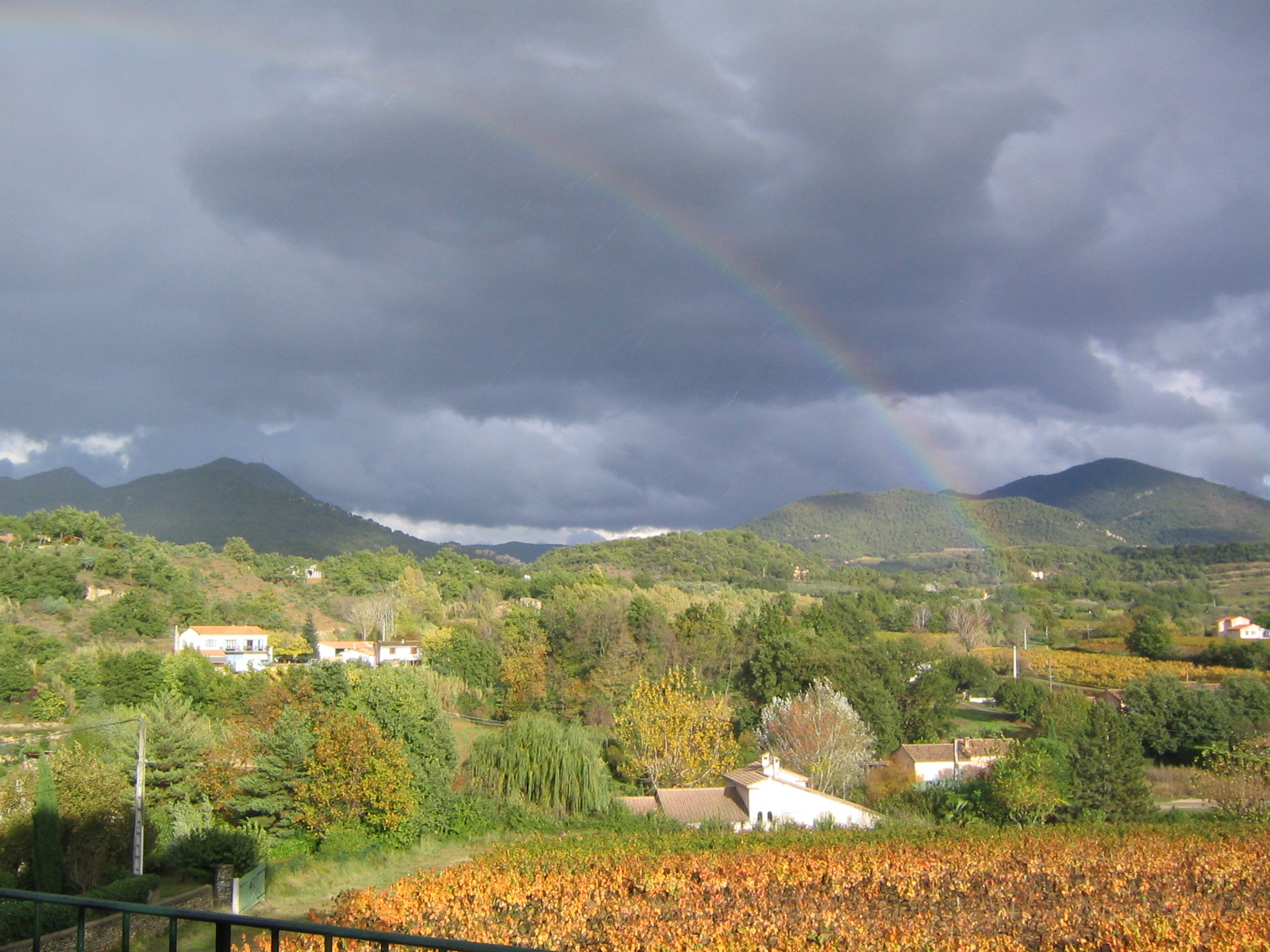
Les Josiols in 2005

Les Josiols is a former Jewish quarter situated north of Mirabel-aux-Baronnies, a French commune in the southern Drôme department.

== History ==
Mirabel, which was first mentioned in 1059, had a flourishing Jewish quarter until 1348. The Jews that inhabited Les Josiols were merchants with flourishing businesses. In 1348, the inhabitants were either expelled or assassinated due to the accusation that they had distributed the pest. In fact, the Black Death outbreak of 1348 followed several years of bad harvests and had made numerous victims. It was therefore that the inhabitants of Mirabel felt that somebody had to be punished. Finally, the Jews were accused of having poisoned the drinking water wells of Mirabel. The creek Françonne served as a source of drinking water for the Jews, so they did not suffer from the poison, was the hearsay. Their houses were completely destroyed, those who resisted were murdered, the ones that fled went to Carpentras. The Dauphin of the Dauphiné (later the French department Drôme) and even the Pope intervened but could do little to save the Jews of Mirabel.

Today Les Josiols is just a hillside covered with bare saffre (sandstone), olive trees, vineyards, and some farms.

== Climate ==
Situated on a hillside, Mirabel has a mild climate.
