= Brantes =

- Commune
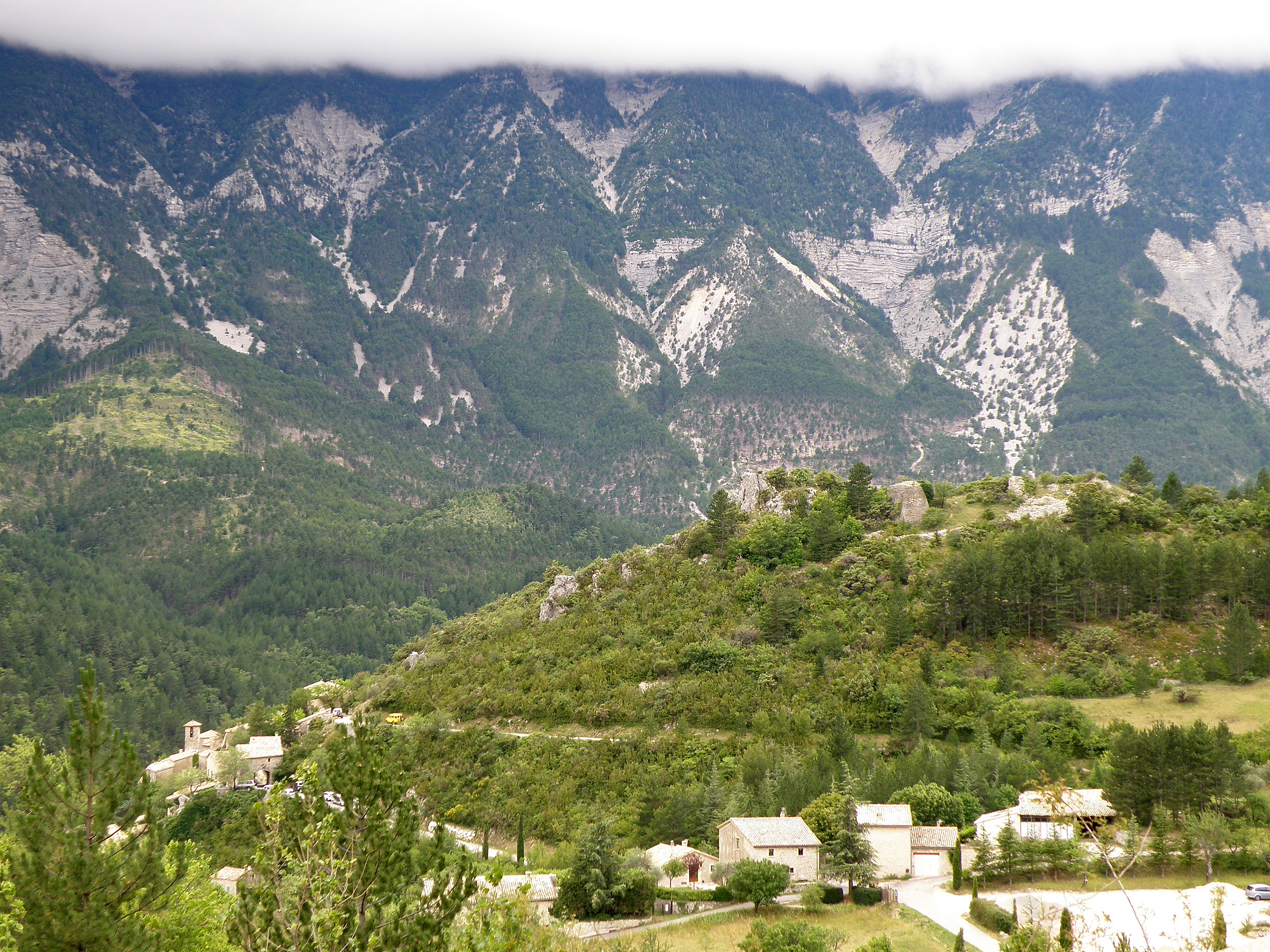
- A general view of Brantes, with the slopes of Mont Ventoux in the background

- Coat of arms
- Location of Brantes
- Location within France Location within Provence-Alpes-Côte d'Azur
- Coordinates: 44°11′39″N 5°20′03″E
- Country: France
- Region: Provence-Alpes-Côte d'Azur
- Department: Vaucluse
- Arrondissement: Carpentras
- Canton: Vaison-la-Romaine

Government
  - Mayor (2020–2026): Roland Ruegg
- Area^{1}: 28.18 km^{2} (10.88 sq mi)
- Elevation: 546 m (1,791 ft)
- Highest elevation: 1,900 m (6,200 ft)
- Lowest elevation: 425 m (1,394 ft)
- Population (2023): 86
  - Density: 3.1/km^{2} (7.9/sq mi)
- Time zone: UTC+01:00 (CET)
  - Summer (DST): UTC+02:00 (CEST)
- INSEE/Postal code: 84021 /84390
- ^{1} French Land Register data, which excludes lakes, ponds, glaciers > 1 km^{2} (0.386 sq mi or 247 acres) and river estuaries.

Brantes (French pronunciation: [bʁɑ̃t]; Occitan: Brantas) is a commune in the Vaucluse department in the Provence-Alpes-Côte d'Azur region in southeastern France.

== See also ==
- Communes of the Vaucluse department
- Baronnies
