= Françonne =

- The Françonne in the summer of 2004

Location
- Country: France

Physical characteristics
- Mouth
  - location: Gaude River
  - coordinates: 44°18′40″N 5°6′6″E

La Françonne is a creek situated north of Mirabel-aux-Baronnies in France, department Drôme, and to the east of the former Jewish quarter called les Josiols. This quarter existed until 1348, when the inhabitants of Les Josiols were assassinated due to rumours that they had caused the outbreak of the pest in Mirabel by poisoning the wells. The Jews themselves were said not to suffer from the pest as they drank water from the creek Françonne. Françonne is also the name of the site situated east of Les Josiols, the creek passing in between.

The Françonne joins the Gaude River, a contributor of the Eygues River.

== Actual situation ==
The Françonne is nowadays a small creek of about one meter width, since the flood of 1992 the borders have not been flooded anymore.

== For more information ==
1. P. Olivier-Elliott: Les Baronnies, ISBN 2-7449-0266-7
2. Claude Leone-Chanot: Mirabel aux Baronnies, ISBN 2-903044-85-6
3. www.mirabelauxbaronnies.fr
