= Buis-les-Baronnies =

Buis-les-Baronnies Lo Bois dei Baroniás (Occitan)
- Commune
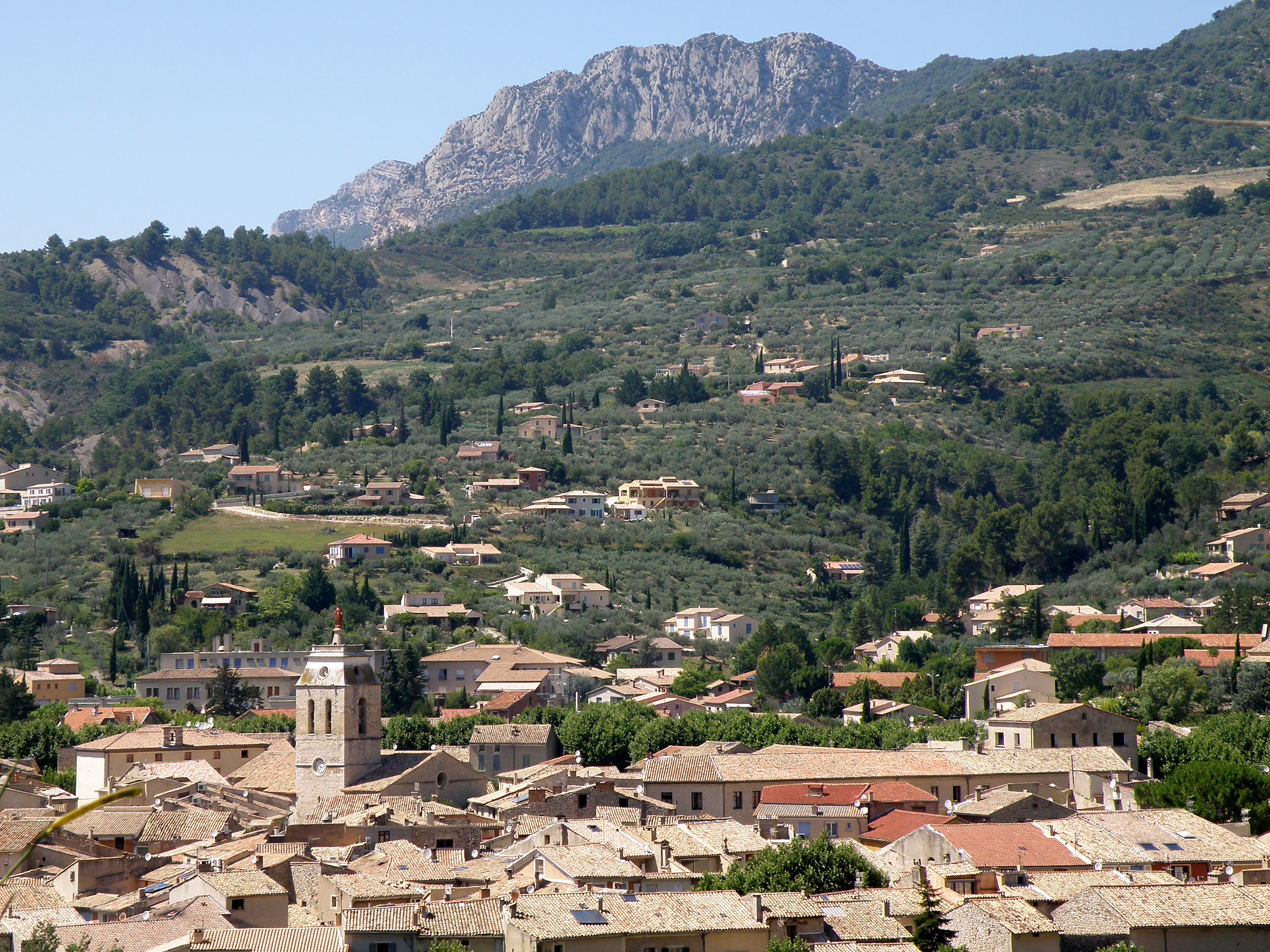
- A general view of Buis-les-Baronnies

- Coat of arms
- Location of Buis-les-Baronnies
- Location within France Location within Auvergne-Rhône-Alpes
- Coordinates: 44°16′35″N 5°16′31″E
- Country: France
- Region: Auvergne-Rhône-Alpes
- Department: Drôme
- Arrondissement: Nyons
- Canton: Nyons et Baronnies
- Intercommunality: CC des Baronnies en Drôme provençale

Government
  - Mayor (2020–2026): Sébastien Bernard
- Area^{1}: 33.74 km^{2} (13.03 sq mi)
- Elevation: 370 m (1,210 ft)
- Highest elevation: 1,080 m (3,540 ft)
- Lowest elevation: 319 m (1,047 ft)
- Population (2023): 2,218
  - Density: 65.74/km^{2} (170.3/sq mi)
- Demonym: Buxois
- Time zone: UTC+01:00 (CET)
  - Summer (DST): UTC+02:00 (CEST)
- INSEE/Postal code: 26063 /26170
- Website: www.buislesbaronnies.fr
- ^{1} French Land Register data, which excludes lakes, ponds, glaciers > 1 km^{2} (0.386 sq mi or 247 acres) and river estuaries.

Buis-les-Baronnies (French pronunciation: [bɥi le baʁɔni]; Vivaro-Alpine Occitan: Lo Bois dei Baroniás) is a commune in the Drôme department in the Auvergne-Rhône-Alpes region in Southeastern France.

== Geography ==
Buis-les-Baronnies is located on the right bank of the river Ouvèze (Buis-les-Baronnies as a town has limits on the other bank).

== Demographics ==
Historical population
Year	Pop.	±% p.a.
1968	1,602	—
1975	1,729	+1.10%
1982	1,885	+1.24%
1990	2,030	+0.93%
1999	2,226	+1.03%
2007	2,290	+0.35%
2012	2,257	−0.29%
2017	2,302	+0.40%
2023	2,218	−0.62%
Source: INSEE

== See also ==
- Baronnies
- Communes of the Drôme department
