= Mirabel-aux-Baronnies =

- Commune
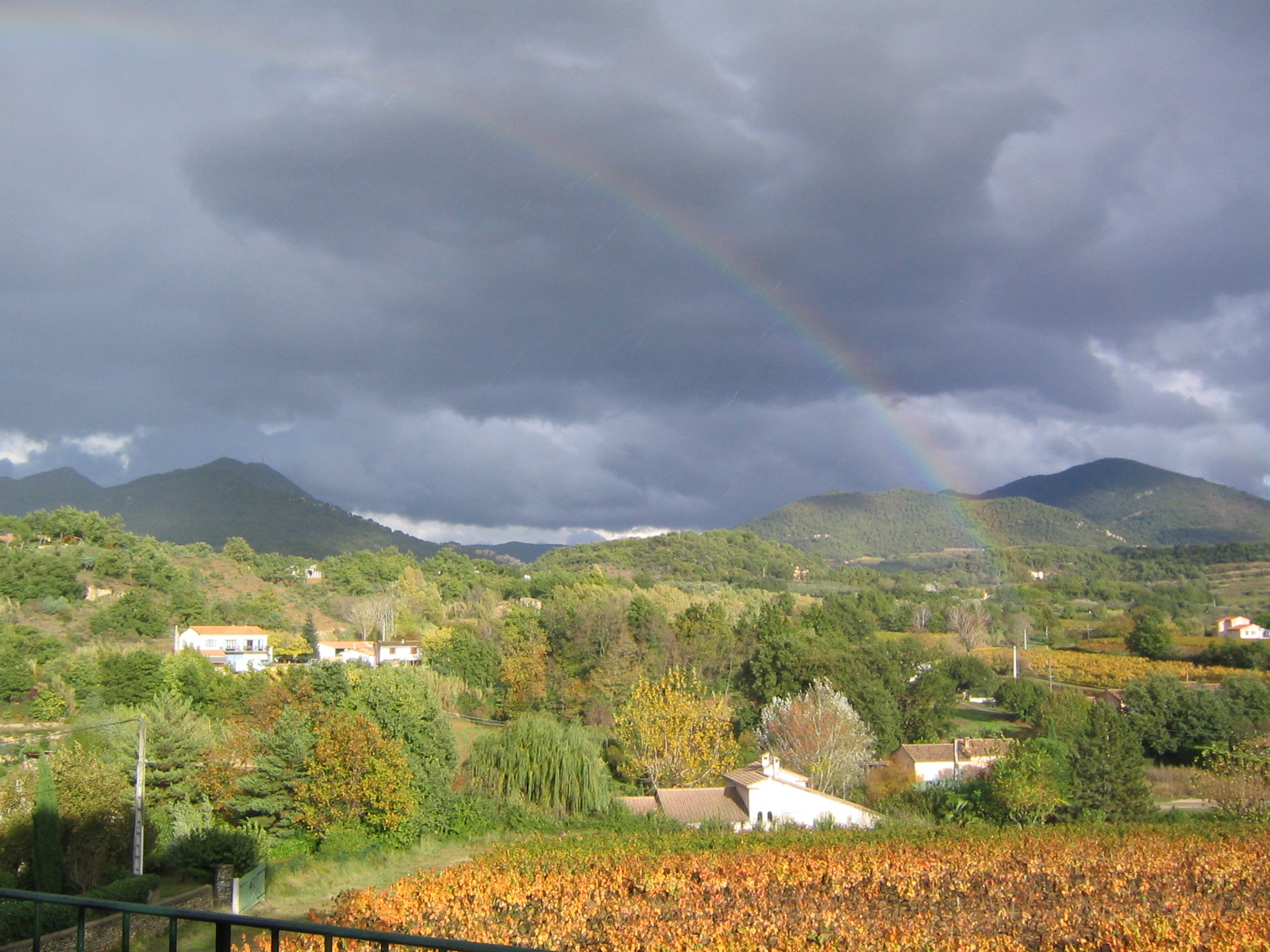
- Les Josiols area of Mirabel-aux-Baronnies
- Location of Mirabel-aux-Baronnies
- Location within France Location within Auvergne-Rhône-Alpes
- Coordinates: 44°18′41″N 5°06′39″E
- Country: France
- Region: Auvergne-Rhône-Alpes
- Department: Drôme
- Arrondissement: Nyons
- Canton: Nyons et Baronnies

Government
  - Mayor (2020–2026): Christian Cornillac
- Area^{1}: 22.56 km^{2} (8.71 sq mi)
- Elevation: 263 m (863 ft)
- Highest elevation: 791 m (2,595 ft)
- Lowest elevation: 206 m (676 ft)
- Population (2023): 1,502
  - Density: 66.58/km^{2} (172.4/sq mi)
- Time zone: UTC+01:00 (CET)
  - Summer (DST): UTC+02:00 (CEST)
- INSEE/Postal code: 26182 /26110
- ^{1} French Land Register data, which excludes lakes, ponds, glaciers > 1 km^{2} (0.386 sq mi or 247 acres) and river estuaries.

Mirabel-aux-Baronnies (French pronunciation: [miʁabɛl o baʁɔni]; Occitan: Mirabèu) is a commune in the Drôme department in the Auvergne-Rhône-Alpes region in southeastern France.

Perched on top of a hill, Mirabel is renowned for its mild climate and scenery. It was first mentioned in 1059 as Mirabello Castello.

Mirabel-aux-Baronnies is situated next to the river Gaude on a hill halfways between Nyons and Vaison-la-Romaine and had a castle with a tower so high that one could see Orange in Vaucluse. The castle incorporated the chapel of Saint Julien.

== History ==
Mirabel-aux-Baronnies is the former capital of a Vocontii tribe, the Gaudenses. It is said that Mirabel has its name from the previously mentioned high tower of the former castle, the tower was named Turris Mirabellis. Later known as Castrum Mirabellum, it was part of the county of the Montauban-family. 9 October 1206, baron Dragonet de Montauban and his son Raymond exchanged with Eliarde, abesse of Saint-Cesaire of Arles, Mirabel and its surroundings for the signeurship of Vinsobres.
After annexation of the baronies by the Dauphin, Mirabel grew in importance (it had even its own money) and in number of inhabitants. The castle was fortified and enlarged, the chapel of St-Julien was rebuilt. The domaine de Beaulieu, at the south of Mirabel became one of the principal residences of the Dauphin. In the 14th century Mirabel was heavily damaged by the religion-based wars.
Until 1348 Mirabel-aux-Baronnies did have a Jewish quarter called Les Josiols, positioned outside the walls on the north next to the creek Françonne. Due to the suspicion they caused the Black Death, the Jews were either expelled or assassinated in 1348. The houses in the quarter were destroyed.

After the arrival of Protestantism in the region, Mirabel-aux-Baronnies changed a lot. First, the chapel of St-Julien was destroyed and in 1633 the castle and a part of the walls. Those walls were restored in 1652 because again the pest was feared, and equipped with 4 new gates. The present church is reconstructed on the remains of the old chapel during 1645-1651. Between 1790 en 1800, Mirabel was chief-lieu of the Canton. After July 1794 (murder of Robespierre) Mirabel was a major centre of royalist parties.

Mirabel-aux-Baronnies was one of the first villages having a public water system. In 1876, Italian specialists were hired. They lived for several years in Mirabel and even had an own school for their children. The water coming from the source Tune, more than 4 km (2.5 mi) outside the village, was captured and fed into a system of in-situ made concrete tubes of 20 cm diameter (see figure), alimenting 2 fountains and 4 reservoirs (F: lavoir) with fresh drinking water. The fountains, one of which originated in the 13th century and was later adapted for use with the water system, are still in good condition. Those eldest fountain is situated on the old market-square.

== Population ==
Historical population

Year	Pop.	±% p.a.
1856	2,008	—
1881	1,556	−1.01%
1911	1,260	−0.70%
1931	961	−1.35%
1946	971	+0.07%
1962	879	−0.62%
1968	886	+0.13%
1975	901	+0.24%

Year	Pop.	±% p.a.
1982	1,048	+2.18%
1990	1,276	+2.49%
1999	1,335	+0.50%
2007	1,512	+1.57%
2012	1,555	+0.56%
2017	1,620	+0.82%
2023	1,502	−1.25%

Source: EHESS and INSEE

== Daily life ==
Friday is (food) market day in Mirabel. From 30 November until the end of February there is an olive market which starts at eight o'clock in the morning every Saturday.

There is also an antiques market held on the first and third Sunday of every month from June till September. The village's fête du vin takes place annually on 15 August.

The amenities located in Mirabel include a tourist office, post office, two bakeries, one bureau de tabac, one pharmacy, two restaurants, two bars, one salon de thé (teahouse), one butcher, one antique bookseller, one brocante, one old olive mill (museum), one current olive mill (Chameil).

== Sights ==
- The church St Julien, 13th century, rebuilt 1645- 1651.
- Some remains of the old Castle, 13th century.
- The old fortifications (chemin des Barrys), 12th century.
- The old fountain on the Place des Armes, 13th century.
- The chapel N.D. de Beaulieu (2 kilometres south-west of Mirabel), the remains of the old residence of the Dauphins.
- The chapel Calvaire.
- The chapel St. Pierre (north-east of Mirabel, isolated).
- Prehistoric caves known as "des Huguenots" and "des Sarrasins".
- Remains of the tower of Mialon.
- The forest of the King.

== Notable people ==
Estelle Leblond - motorcycle sidecar racer.

== Images ==
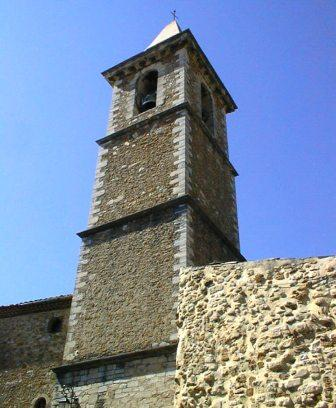
The church

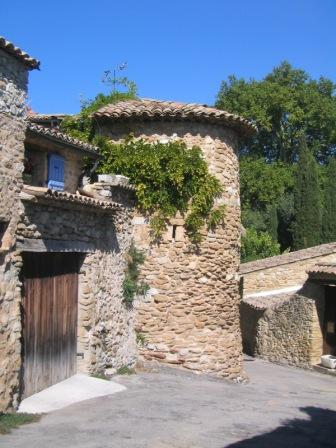
The remains of the walls

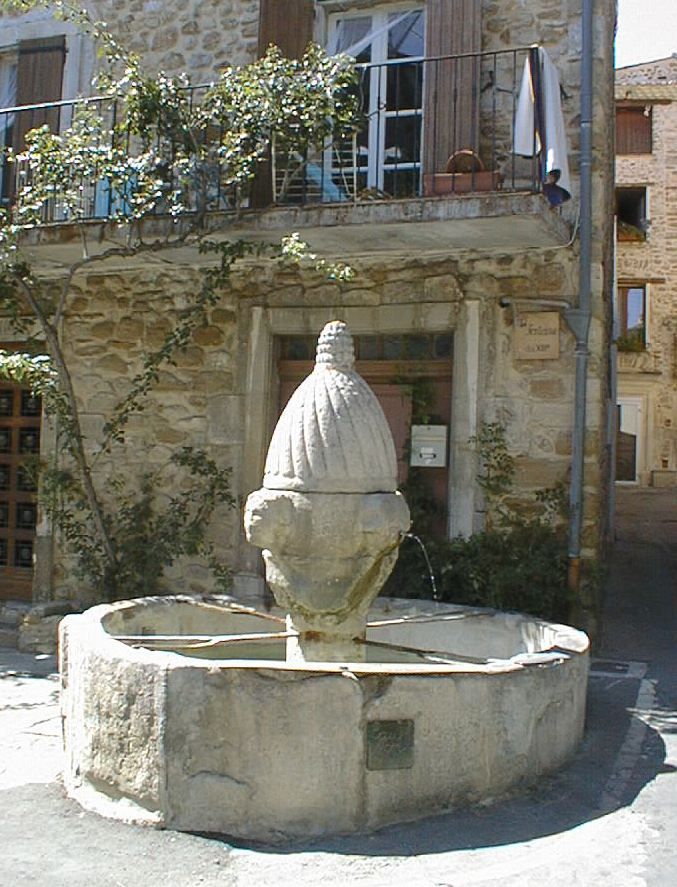
The old fountain

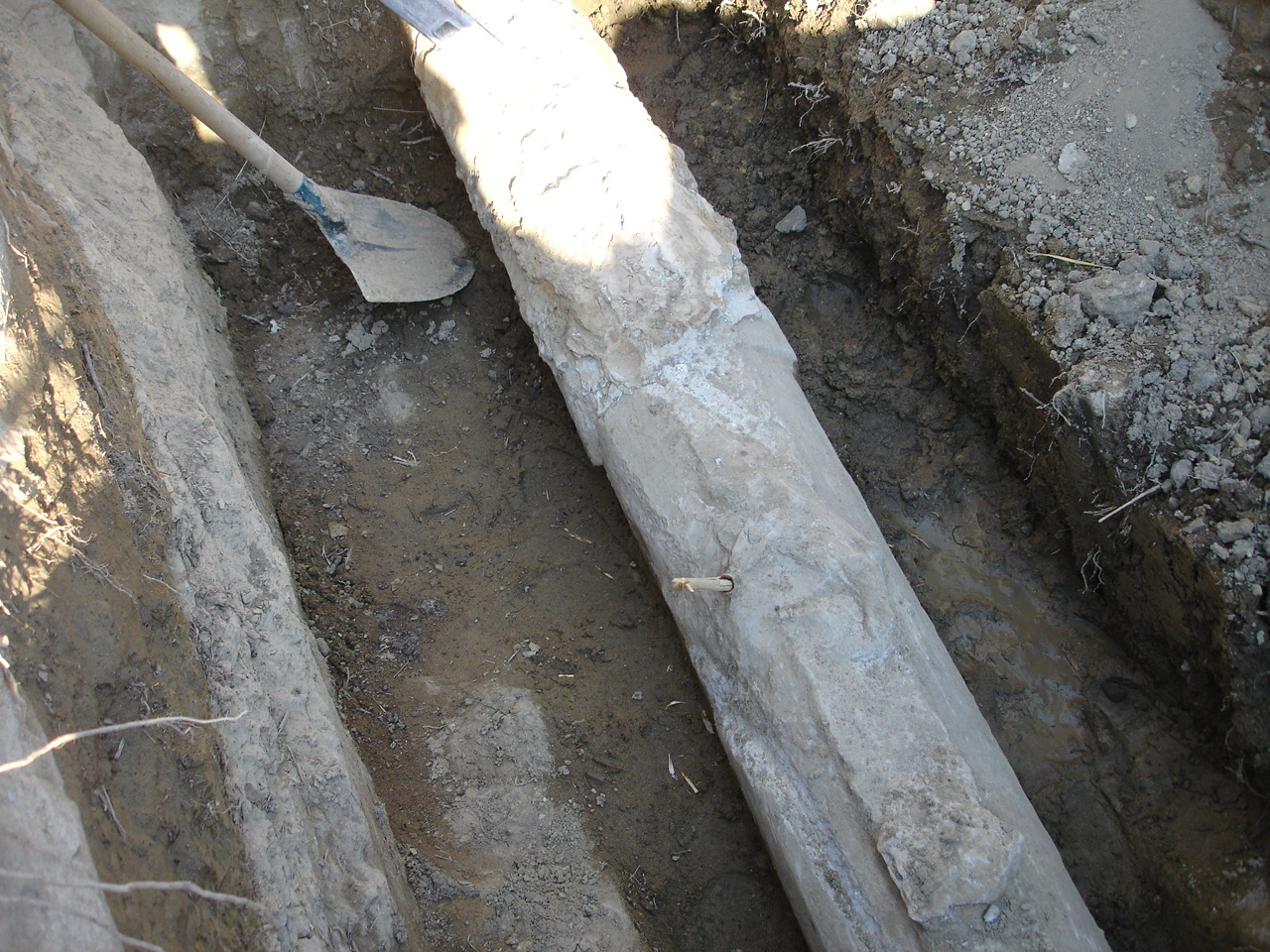
Part of the in 1876 in situ made concrete tube of the watersystem, during reparation and connection of a tap 2006

== See also ==
- Baronnies
- Communes of the Drôme department
