= Mantuan Ghetto =

- Ghetto di Mantova (Italian)
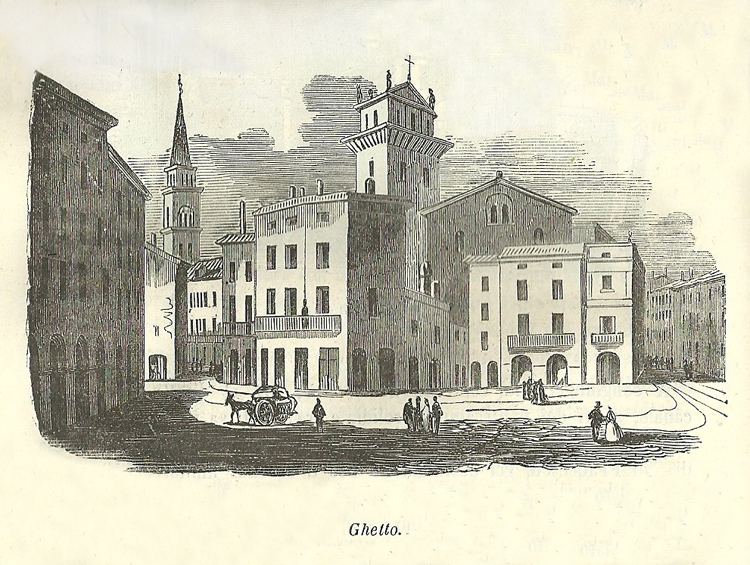

History
- Established: 1612
- Demolished: 1798

The Ghetto of Mantua was the former enclosed Jewish quarter or ghetto in the city of Mantua, region of Lombardy, Italy.

== History ==
The Jewish community in Mantua rose to prominence under the rule of the Gonzaga; documents date at least their presence to the 12th century. By the start of the 17th century, they putatively numbered over 2,000 individuals and accounted for nearly 7.5% of the population of Mantua. By 1612, under pressure by the Papacy, Duke Vincenzo I Gonzaga enforced the segregation of the ghetto. The area comprised by streets now named Dottrina Cristiana, Pomponazzo, Calvi, Spagnoli and Giustiziati was enclosed by four gates that were closed from dusk to dawn. The situation of Jews in Mantua worsened in 1629–1630 during the siege and subsequent sack of Mantua during the War of the Mantuan Succession; the city was afflicted with the plague, when after months of siege, in July 1630, Mantua was sacked for three days by mercenary Landsknecht troops led by Count Aldringen and Gallas fighting for Ferdinand II, Holy Roman Emperor.

With deposition of Duke Ferdinando Carlo Gonzaga by 1707 by the Hapsburg Emperor Joseph I, some civil liberties were granted to the Jews. However, abolition of the ghetto gates did not occur until the Napoleonic invasions in 1798, thus allowing Jews to live freely through the town. A guide from 1866 notes that the area had multiple synagogues, some designed by Bibiena and followers. A synagogue designed by Giovanni Battista Vergani was inaugurated on 30 December 1843. The area of the ghetto is no longer a predominantly Jewish neighborhood, and there are few structural and geographic details that recall the prior history. The late 17th-century Rabbi's house on Via Bertani has sculpted relief plaques with views of the town.

Until the 19th century, Mantua was Lombardy's only significant Jewish community. Many Mantuan Jews later moved to Milan, and the Milan community originally developed as a branch of that in Mantua.
