= Venterol, Drôme =

Venterol
- Commune
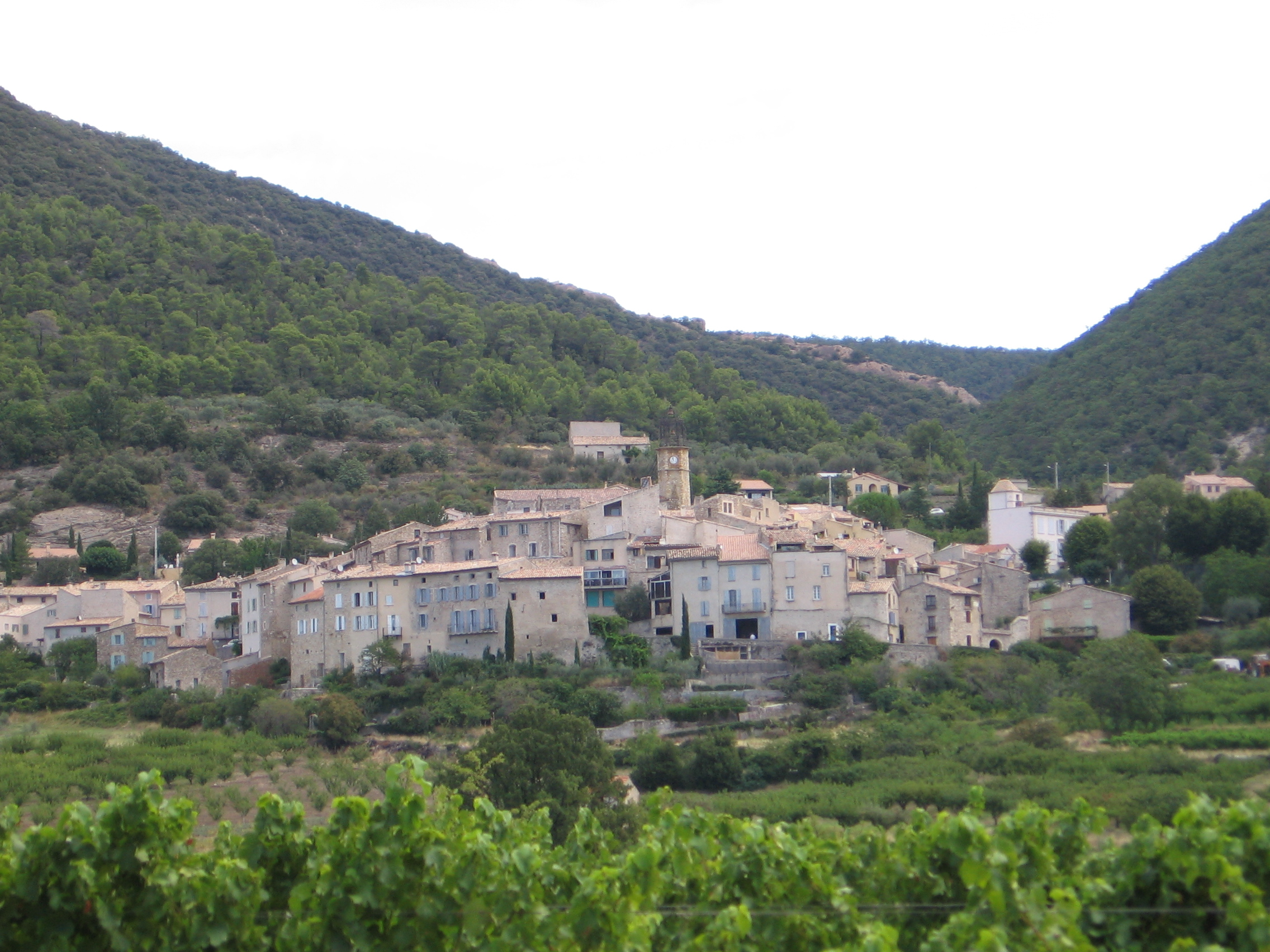
- A general view of Venterol
- Location of Venterol
- Location within France Location within Auvergne-Rhône-Alpes
- Coordinates: 44°23′24″N 5°06′39″E
- Country: France
- Region: Auvergne-Rhône-Alpes
- Department: Drôme
- Arrondissement: Nyons
- Canton: Nyons et Baronnies

Government
  - Mayor (2021–2026): Alexandre Penigaut
- Area^{1}: 31.69 km^{2} (12.24 sq mi)
- Highest elevation: 1,165 m (3,822 ft)
- Lowest elevation: 298 m (978 ft)
- Population (2023): 625
  - Density: 19.7/km^{2} (51.1/sq mi)
- Time zone: UTC+01:00 (CET)
  - Summer (DST): UTC+02:00 (CEST)
- INSEE/Postal code: 26367 /26110
- ^{1} French Land Register data, which excludes lakes, ponds, glaciers > 1 km^{2} (0.386 sq mi or 247 acres) and river estuaries.

Venterol (French pronunciation: [vɛ̃t(ə)ʁɔl]) is a commune in the Drôme department in southeastern France.

== Population ==
Historical population
Year	Pop.	±% p.a.
1968	429	—
1975	488	+1.86%
1982	567	+2.17%
1990	587	+0.43%
1999	630	+0.79%
2007	634	+0.08%
2012	681	+1.44%
2017	699	+0.52%
2023	625	−1.85%
Source: INSEE

== See also ==
- Communes of the Drôme department
