= Sainte-Jalle =

- Commune
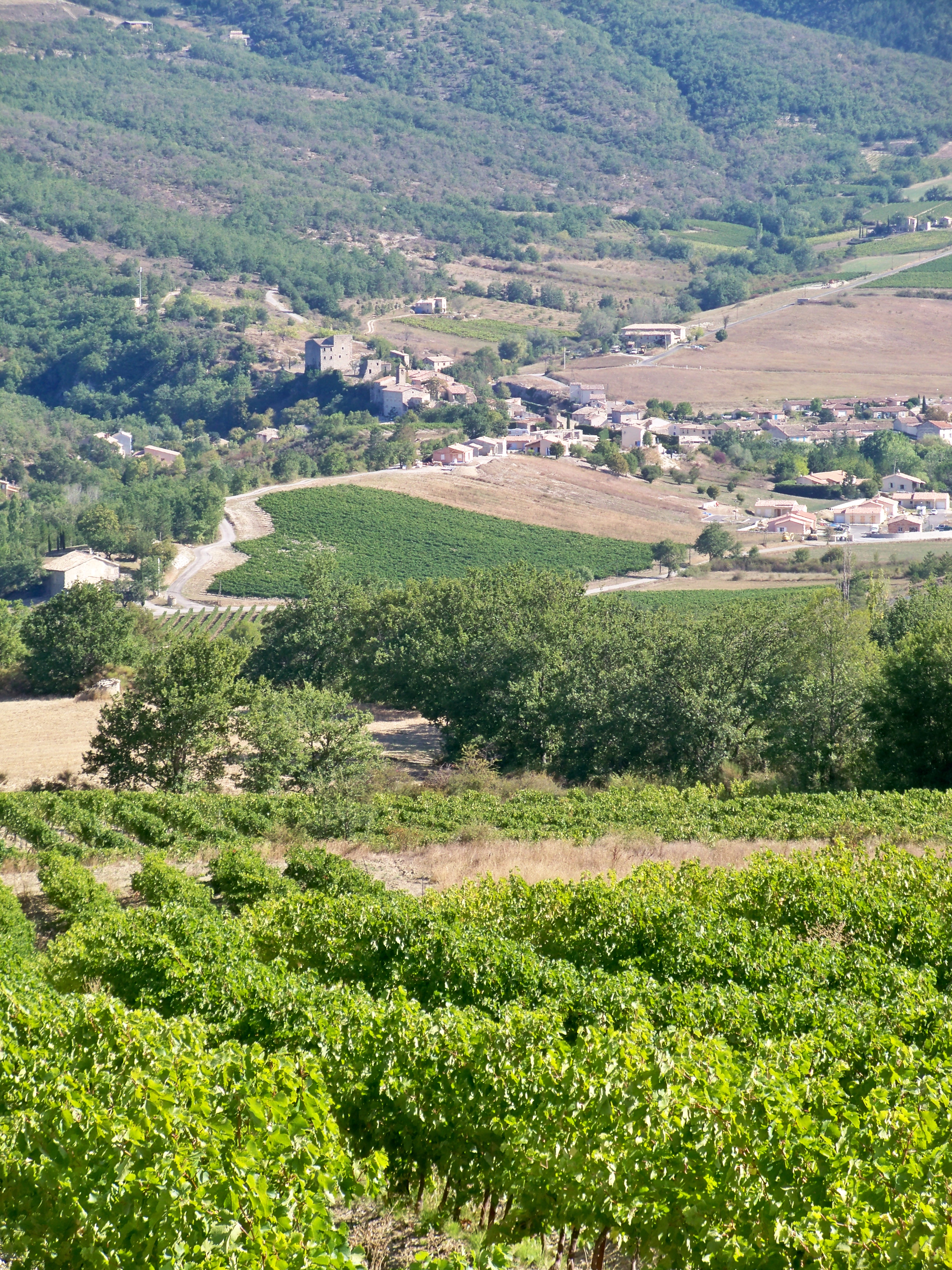
- Sainte-Jalle and its vineyards
- Location of Sainte-Jalle
- Location within France Location within Auvergne-Rhône-Alpes
- Coordinates: 44°20′45″N 5°17′05″E
- Country: France
- Region: Auvergne-Rhône-Alpes
- Department: Drôme
- Arrondissement: Nyons
- Canton: Nyons et Baronnies

Government
  - Mayor (2024–2026): Marie-Noëlle Armand
- Area^{1}: 18.16 km^{2} (7.01 sq mi)
- Elevation: 407 m (1,335 ft)
- Highest elevation: 1,025 m (3,363 ft)
- Lowest elevation: 376 m (1,234 ft)
- Population (2023): 330
  - Density: 18/km^{2} (47/sq mi)
- Time zone: UTC+01:00 (CET)
  - Summer (DST): UTC+02:00 (CEST)
- INSEE/Postal code: 26306 /26110
- ^{1} French Land Register data, which excludes lakes, ponds, glaciers > 1 km^{2} (0.386 sq mi or 247 acres) and river estuaries.

Sainte-Jalle (French pronunciation: [sɛ̃t ʒal]; Occitan: Santa Jala) is a commune in the Drôme department in southeastern France.

== Population ==
Historical population
Year	Pop.	±% p.a.
1968	291	—
1975	263	−1.43%
1982	251	−0.66%
1990	260	+0.44%
1999	269	+0.38%
2007	272	+0.14%
2012	280	+0.58%
2017	308	+1.92%
2023	330	+1.16%
Source: INSEE

== See also ==
- Communes of the Drôme department
