= Montbrun-les-Bains =

- Commune
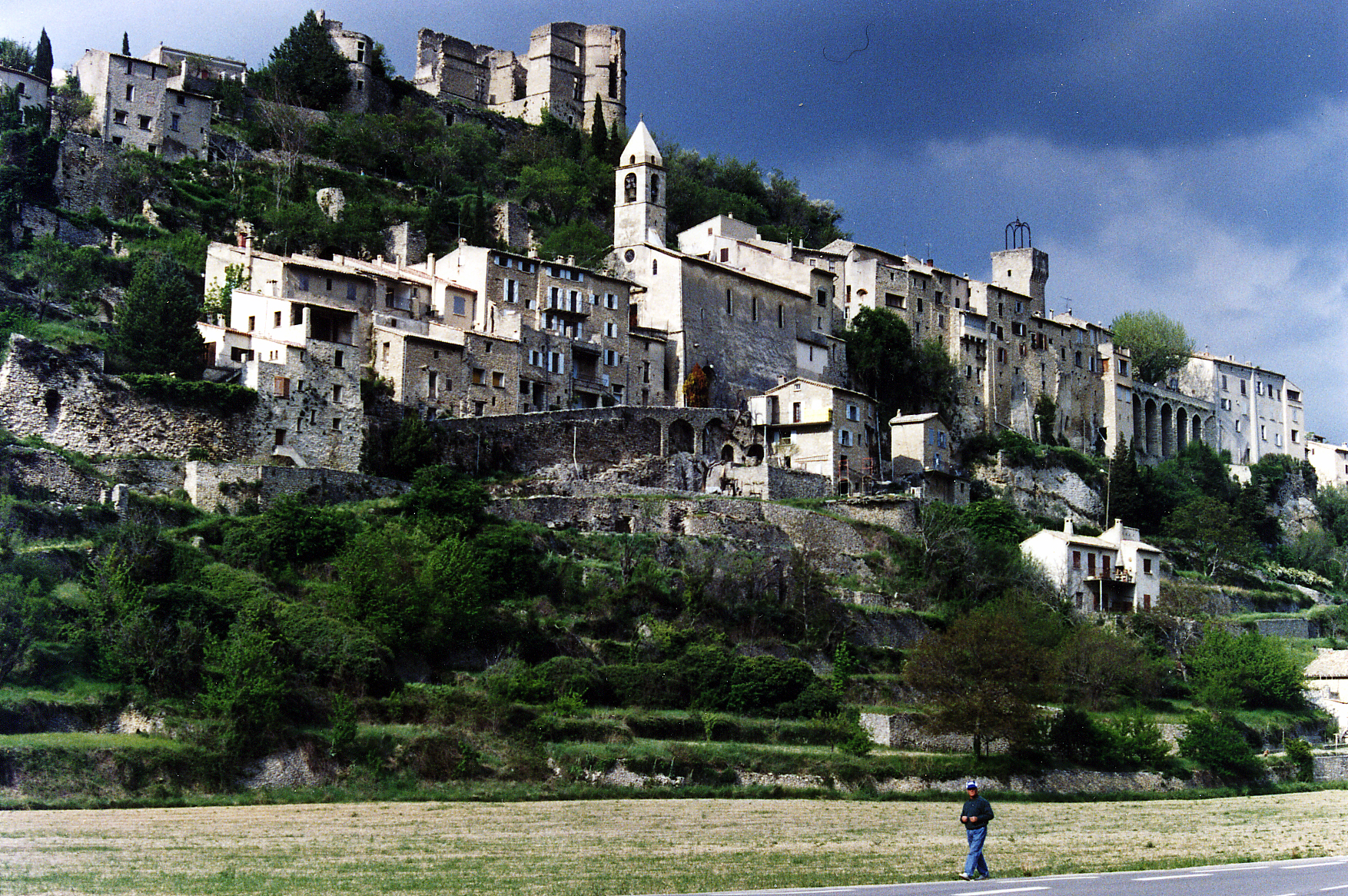
- The village of Montbrun-les-Bains

- Coat of arms
- Location of Montbrun-les-Bains
- Location within France Location within Auvergne-Rhône-Alpes
- Coordinates: 44°10′34″N 5°26′37″E
- Country: France
- Region: Auvergne-Rhône-Alpes
- Department: Drôme
- Arrondissement: Nyons
- Canton: Nyons et Baronnies

Government
  - Mayor (2020–2026): Didier Gillet
- Area^{1}: 33.26 km^{2} (12.84 sq mi)
- Highest elevation: 1,362 m (4,469 ft)
- Lowest elevation: 568 m (1,864 ft)
- Population (2023): 442
  - Density: 13.3/km^{2} (34.4/sq mi)
- Time zone: UTC+01:00 (CET)
  - Summer (DST): UTC+02:00 (CEST)
- INSEE/Postal code: 26193 /26570
- ^{1} French Land Register data, which excludes lakes, ponds, glaciers > 1 km^{2} (0.386 sq mi or 247 acres) and river estuaries.

Montbrun-les-Bains (French pronunciation: [mɔ̃bʁœ̃ le bɛ̃]; Occitan: Montbrun) is a commune in the Drôme department in southeastern France. It is a member of Les Plus Beaux Villages de France (The Most Beautiful Villages of France) Association.

The commune is well known for its spa treatments for managing respiratory disease and other medical disorders. The village is also very popular with cyclists, with cycle routes leading to the popular Mont Ventoux.

== Population ==
Historical population
| Year | Pop. | ±% p.a. |
|---|---|---|
| 1968 | 464 | — |
| 1975 | 479 | +0.46% |
| 1982 | 523 | +1.26% |
| 1990 | 467 | −1.41% |
| 1999 | 428 | −0.96% |
| 2007 | 448 | +0.57% |
| 2012 | 413 | −1.61% |
| 2017 | 441 | +1.32% |
| 2023 | 442 | +0.04% |
Source: INSEE

== See also ==
- Communes of the Drôme department
