= Canton of Rémuzat =

Coordinates: 44°24′02″N 5°23′21″E

Rémuzat
- Former canton
- Interactive map of Rémuzat
- Country: France
- Region: Auvergne-Rhône-Alpes
- Department: Drôme
- No. of communes: {{{nbcomm}}}
- Disbanded: 2015
- Area: 28,339 km^{2} (10,942 sq mi)
- Population (2012): 1,391
  - Density: 0.04908/km^{2} (0.1271/sq mi)

The Canton of Rémuzat is a former canton located in the Department of Drôme, in the Arrondissement of Nyons. It had 1,391 inhabitants (2012). It was disbanded following the French canton reorganisation which came into effect in March 2015. It consisted of 16 communes, which joined the canton of Nyons et Baronnies in 2015.

== Composition ==
It was composed of the following communes:

- La Charce
- Chauvac-Laux-Montaux
- Cornillac
- Cornillon-sur-l'Oule
- Lemps
- Montferrand-la-Fare
- Montréal-les-Sources
- Pelonne
- Le Poët-Sigillat
- Pommerol
- Rémuzat (chef-lieu)
- Roussieux
- Sahune
- Saint-May
- Verclause
- Villeperdrix

== Political history ==
- 1955-1967 M. Rolland Centrist then DVD
- 1967-1979 M. Latil DVD
- 1979-2004 Jean Besson Socialist Senator of the Drôme since 1989
- 2004-2014 Hervé Rasclard Socialist Deputy mayor of Bourg-de-Péage, Premier Vice-President of the General Council

== See also ==
- Cantons of the Drôme department
