= Canton of Séderon =

Coordinates: 44°13′42″N 5°32′05″E

Séderon
- Former canton
- Interactive map of Séderon
- Country: France
- Region: Auvergne-Rhône-Alpes
- Department: Drôme
- No. of communes: {{{nbcomm}}}
- Disbanded: 2015
- Population (2012): 2,059

The Canton of Séderon is a former canton located in the Department of Drôme, in the Arrondissement of Nyons. It had 2,059 inhabitants (2012). It was disbanded following the French canton reorganisation which came into effect in March 2015. It consisted of 18 communes, which joined the canton of Nyons et Baronnies in 2015.

== Composition ==
It comprised the following communes:

- Aulan
- Ballons
- Barret-de-Lioure
- Eygalayes
- Ferrassières
- Izon-la-Bruisse
- Laborel
- Lachau
- Mévouillon
- Montauban-sur-l'Ouvèze
- Montbrun-les-Bains
- Montfroc
- Montguers
- Reilhanette
- Séderon
- Vers-sur-Méouge
- Villebois-les-Pins
- Villefranche-le-Château

== Political history ==
- 1951-1958 M. Maigre SFIO
- 1958-1964 M. Constantin Centriste
- 1964-1988 Delphi Andréoléty SFIO puis PS
- 1988-2001 Michel Cossantelli DVG puis PS
- 2001-2014 Paul Arnoux DVG puis PS

== See also ==
- Cantons of the Drôme department
