= Aigues =

River in France

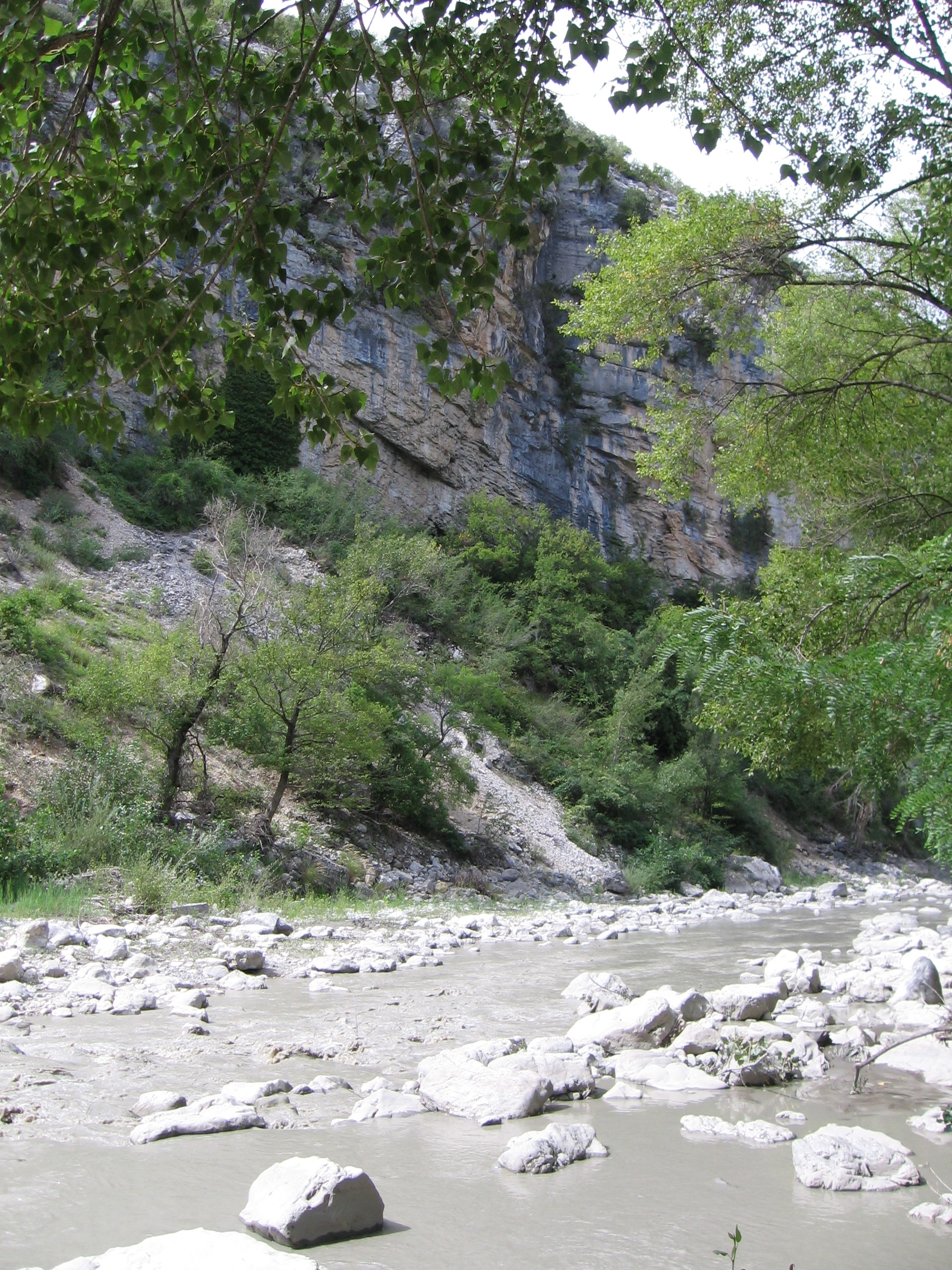
- The Aigues near Nyons

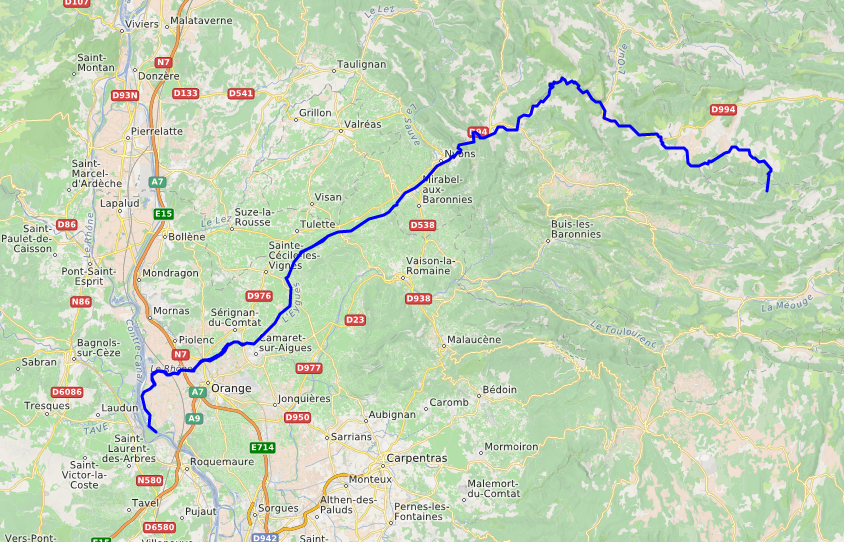

Location
- Country: France

Physical characteristics
- Source
  - location: Baronnies
- Mouth: Rhône
  - location: Caderousse
  - coordinates: 44.0884°N 4.7369°E
- Length: 113.7 km (70.6 mi)
- Basin size: 1,012 km^{2} (391 sq mi)

Basin features
- Progression: Rhône→ Mediterranean Sea

The Aigues, Aigue, Aygues or Eygues (French pronunciation: [ɛɡ]; Occitan: Éguer) is a French river, a tributary of the Rhône. It runs through the departments of Drôme, Hautes-Alpes and Vaucluse. Its source is in the Baronnies mountains. It flows through Verclause, Sahune, Nyons, and it flows into the Rhône at Caderousse. It is 113.7 km (70.6 mi) long. Its drainage basin is 1,012 km^{2} (391 sq mi).

Several spellings of the name are in use: the French national map service Géoportail shows both "l'Aigues" and "l'Aygues" on maps of the same area near Orange, and the village name of Saint-Maurice-sur-Eygues preserves another variant.

Among its tributaries is the Lauzon.
