= Saint-Maurice-sur-Eygues =

- Commune
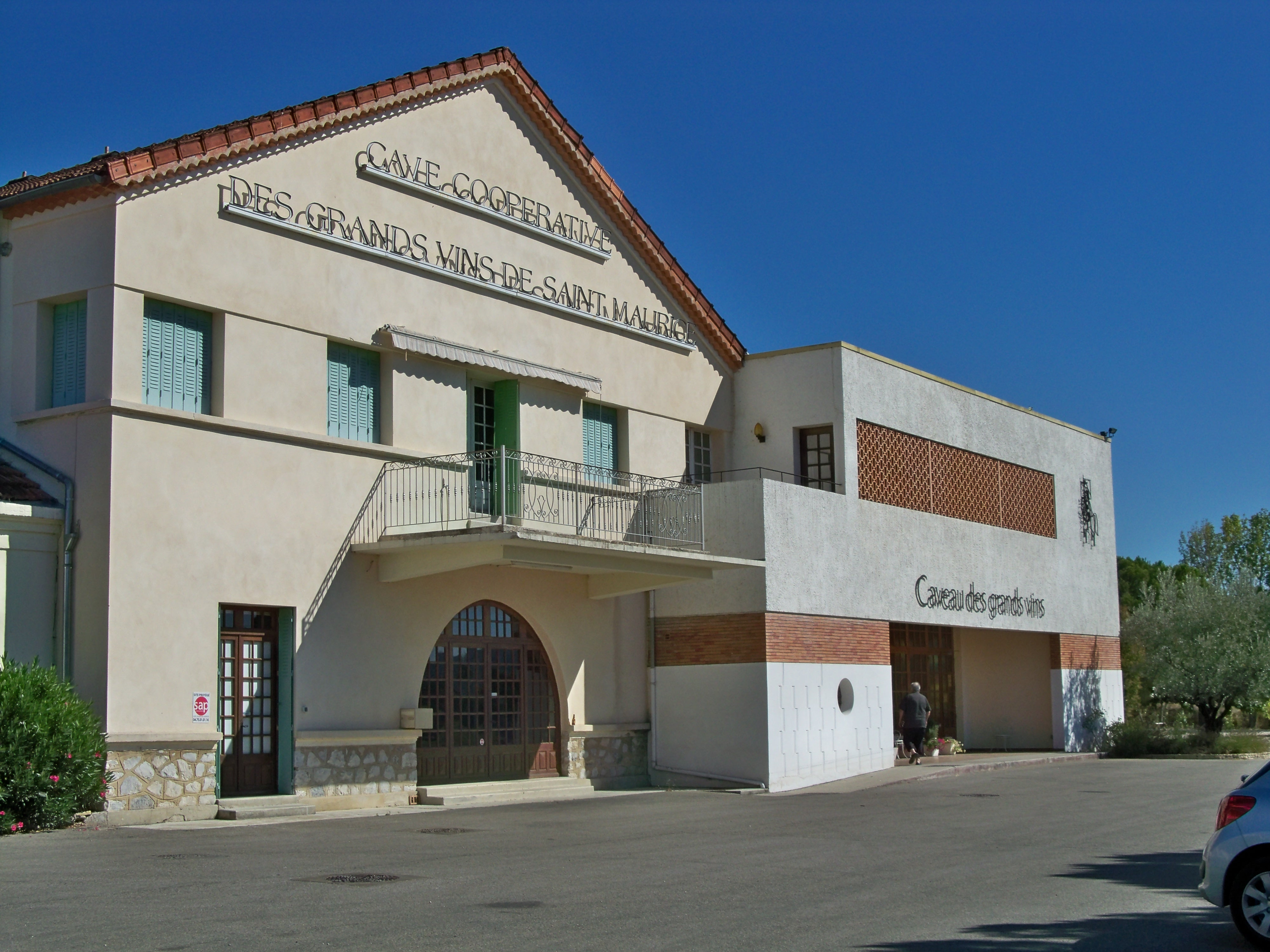
- The Saint-Maurice wine co-operative

- Coat of arms
- Location of Saint-Maurice-sur-Eygues
- Location within France Location within Auvergne-Rhône-Alpes
- Coordinates: 44°17′57″N 5°00′41″E
- Country: France
- Region: Auvergne-Rhône-Alpes
- Department: Drôme
- Arrondissement: Nyons
- Canton: Nyons et Baronnies
- Intercommunality: Baronnies en Drôme Provençale

Government
  - Mayor (2020–2026): Jean Garcia
- Area^{1}: 8.82 km^{2} (3.41 sq mi)
- Elevation: 193 m (633 ft)
- Highest elevation: 387 m (1,270 ft)
- Lowest elevation: 163 m (535 ft)
- Population (2023): 787
  - Density: 89.2/km^{2} (231/sq mi)
- Time zone: UTC+01:00 (CET)
  - Summer (DST): UTC+02:00 (CEST)
- INSEE/Postal code: 26317 /26110
- ^{1} French Land Register data, which excludes lakes, ponds, glaciers > 1 km^{2} (0.386 sq mi or 247 acres) and river estuaries.

Saint-Maurice-sur-Eygues (French: [sɛ̃ mɔʁis syʁ ɛɡ]; literally "Saint-Maurice on Eygues"; Vivaro-Alpine: Sant Maurici) is a commune in the Drôme department in southeastern France.

== Population ==
Historical population
Year	Pop.	±% p.a.
1968	352	—
1975	345	−0.29%
1982	439	+3.50%
1990	484	+1.23%
1999	543	+1.29%
2007	629	+1.85%
2012	700	+2.16%
2017	781	+2.21%
2023	787	+0.13%
Source: INSEE

== See also ==
- Communes of the Drôme department
