= Condorcet (disambiguation) =

Condorcet may refer to:

- Marquis de Condorcet (1743–1794), French philosopher and mathematician, inventor of the Condorcet criterion
- Several related voting theory-related concepts:
  - Condorcet criterion, a voting system criterion relating to the Condorcet winner
  - Condorcet method, any voting system that satisfies the Condorcet criterion
  - Condorcet loser criterion, a voting system criterion complementary to and compatible with the Condorcet criterion
  - Condorcet's paradox, the possibility of not having a Condorcet winner as a result of a cycle of pair-wise defeats
- Sophie de Condorcet, writer, wife of the Marquis de Condorcet
- Condorcet, Drôme, a commune of the Drôme département in France, see Communes of France
- Condorcet (crater), a lunar crater
- French battleship Condorcet, was one of the six Danton class semi-dreadnought battleships built for the French Navy in the mid-1900s
