= Laux =

Laux is a surname. Notable people with the surname include:

- Constance Laux (born 1952), American writer of romance novels
- Dorianne Laux (born 1952), American poet
- Douglas Laux (1983–2025), American intelligence officer
- France Laux (1897–1978), American sportscaster, the first full-time radio voice of baseball in St. Louis
- Philipp Laux (born 1973), German former footballer, now sports psychologist

== See also ==
- Chauvac-Laux-Montaux, commune in the Drôme department in southeastern France
