= Mévouillon =

- Commune
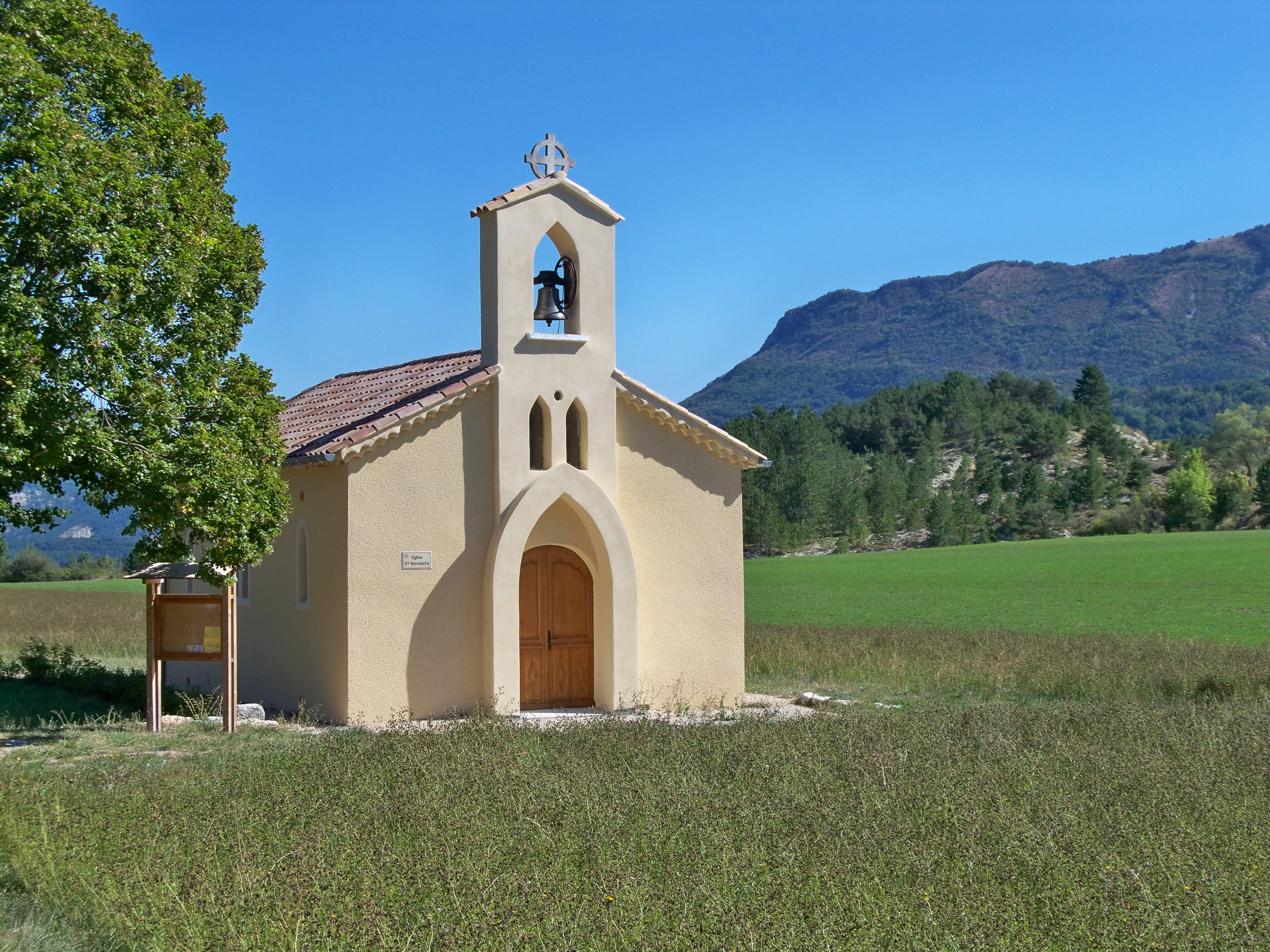
- The church of Sainte Bernadette, in Mévouillon

- Coat of arms
- Location of Mévouillon
- Location within France Location within Auvergne-Rhône-Alpes
- Coordinates: 44°14′33″N 5°27′54″E
- Country: France
- Region: Auvergne-Rhône-Alpes
- Department: Drôme
- Arrondissement: Nyons
- Canton: Nyons et Baronnies

Government
  - Mayor (2020–2026): Odile Tacussel
- Area^{1}: 29.09 km^{2} (11.23 sq mi)
- Elevation: 840 m (2,760 ft)
- Highest elevation: 1,440 m (4,720 ft)
- Lowest elevation: 780 m (2,560 ft)
- Population (2023): 246
  - Density: 8.46/km^{2} (21.9/sq mi)
- Time zone: UTC+01:00 (CET)
  - Summer (DST): UTC+02:00 (CEST)
- INSEE/Postal code: 26181 /26560
- ^{1} French Land Register data, which excludes lakes, ponds, glaciers > 1 km^{2} (0.386 sq mi or 247 acres) and river estuaries.

Mévouillon (French pronunciation: [mevujɔ̃]; Occitan: Mevolhon) is a commune in the Drôme department in southeastern France.

== Population ==
Historical population
Year	Pop.	±% p.a.
1968	283	—
1975	263	−1.04%
1982	233	−1.72%
1990	206	−1.53%
1999	204	−0.11%
2007	212	+0.48%
2012	227	+1.38%
2017	238	+0.95%
2023	246	+0.55%
Source: INSEE

== See also ==
- Communes of the Drôme department
