= Condorcet, Drôme =

Administrative division in Auvergne-Rhône-Alpes, France

Condorcet
- Commune
- Coat of arms
- Location of Condorcet
- Location within France Location within Auvergne-Rhône-Alpes
- Coordinates: 44°24′31″N 5°12′03″E
- Country: France
- Region: Auvergne-Rhône-Alpes
- Department: Drôme
- Arrondissement: Nyons
- Canton: Nyons et Baronnies

Government
  - Mayor (2020–2026): Jean-Claude Brus
- Area^{1}: 22.44 km^{2} (8.66 sq mi)
- Elevation: 337 m (1,106 ft)
- Highest elevation: 1,217 m (3,993 ft)
- Lowest elevation: 301 m (988 ft)
- Population (2023): 496
  - Density: 22.1/km^{2} (57.2/sq mi)
- Time zone: UTC+01:00 (CET)
  - Summer (DST): UTC+02:00 (CEST)
- INSEE/Postal code: 26103 /26110
- ^{1} French Land Register data, which excludes lakes, ponds, glaciers > 1 km^{2} (0.386 sq mi or 247 acres) and river estuaries.

Condorcet (French pronunciation: [kɔ̃dɔʁsɛ]; Occitan: Condorcet) is a commune in the Drôme department in the Auvergne-Rhône-Alpes region in southeastern France.

== Geography ==
Condorcet is roughly 10 km (6.2 mi) north-east of the town of Nyons.

== History ==
The history of Condorcet begins in late antiquity. An old local tradition holds that the ancient, ruined part of the village was once occupied by a forest sacred to druids. The monks of Cluny Abbey founded a priory in Condorcet in the 10th century (first attesting the name as Condacense in pago Diens in 986 AD). The counts of Die (Drôme) were the lords of Condorcet from the earliest days of feudalism.

== Population ==
Historical population
Year	Pop.	±% p.a.
1968	224	—
1975	252	+1.70%
1982	340	+4.37%
1990	386	+1.60%
1999	447	+1.64%
2007	467	+0.55%
2012	487	+0.84%
2017	486	−0.04%
2023	496	+0.34%
Source: INSEE

== See also ==
- Communes of the Drôme department
- Condorcet method
