= Vers-sur-Méouge =

- Commune
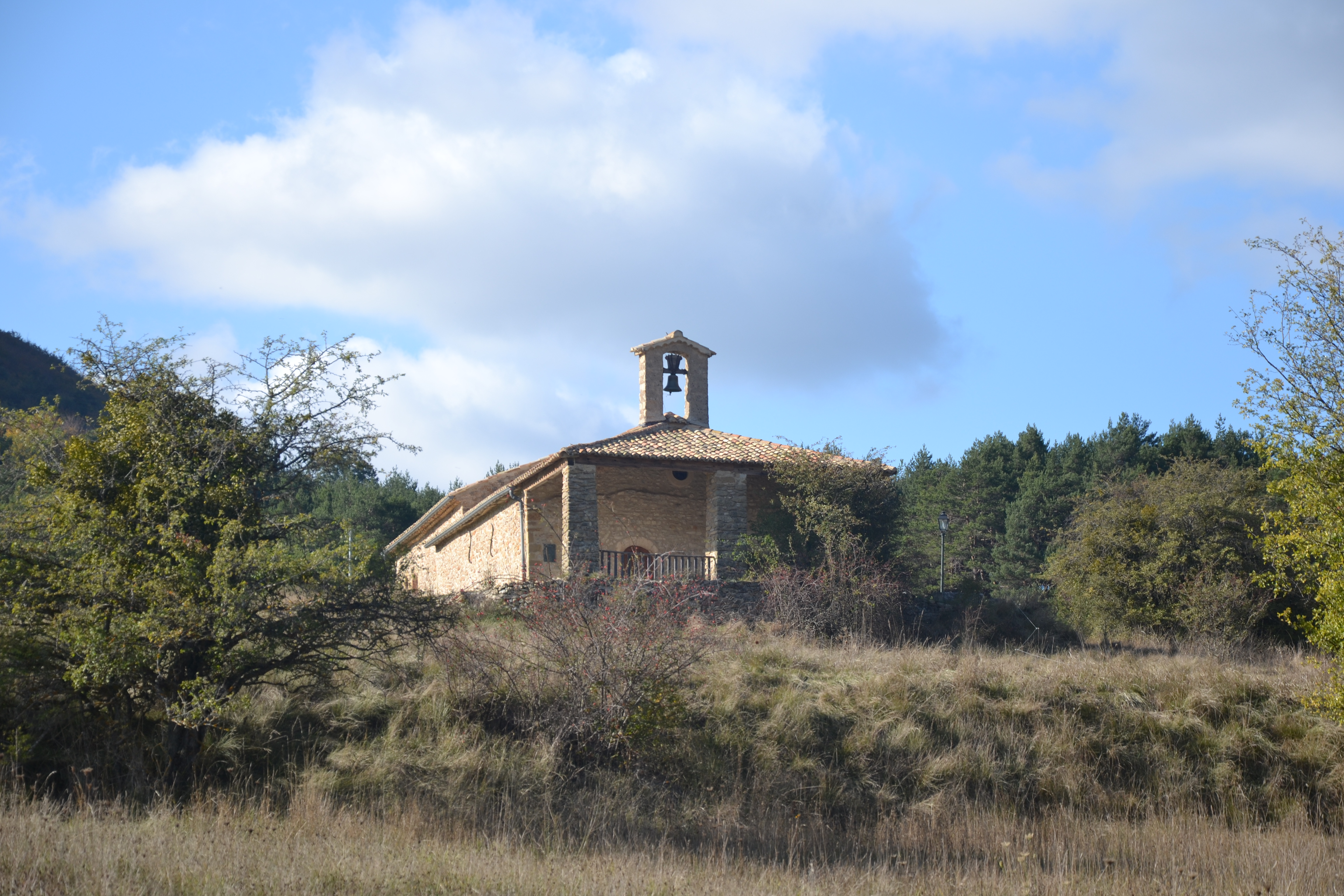
- The chapel of Saint-Côme and Saint-Damien
- Location of Vers-sur-Méouge
- Location within France Location within Auvergne-Rhône-Alpes
- Coordinates: 44°13′52″N 5°34′16″E
- Country: France
- Region: Auvergne-Rhône-Alpes
- Department: Drôme
- Arrondissement: Nyons
- Canton: Nyons et Baronnies
- Intercommunality: Baronnies en Drôme Provençale

Government
  - Mayor (2020–2026): Alain Nicolas
- Area^{1}: 13.81 km^{2} (5.33 sq mi)
- Elevation: 810 m (2,660 ft)
- Highest elevation: 1,395 m (4,577 ft)
- Lowest elevation: 749 m (2,457 ft)
- Population (2023): 42
  - Density: 3.0/km^{2} (7.9/sq mi)
- Time zone: UTC+01:00 (CET)
  - Summer (DST): UTC+02:00 (CEST)
- INSEE/Postal code: 26372 /26560
- ^{1} French Land Register data, which excludes lakes, ponds, glaciers > 1 km^{2} (0.386 sq mi or 247 acres) and river estuaries.

Vers-sur-Méouge is a commune in the Drôme department in southeastern France.

== Population ==
Historical population
Year	Pop.	±% p.a.
1968	58	—
1975	51	−1.82%
1982	28	−8.21%
1990	38	+3.89%
1999	52	+3.55%
2007	43	−2.35%
2012	44	+0.46%
2017	42	−0.93%
2023	42	+0.00%
Source: INSEE

== See also ==
- Communes of the Drôme department
