= Roussieux =

- Commune
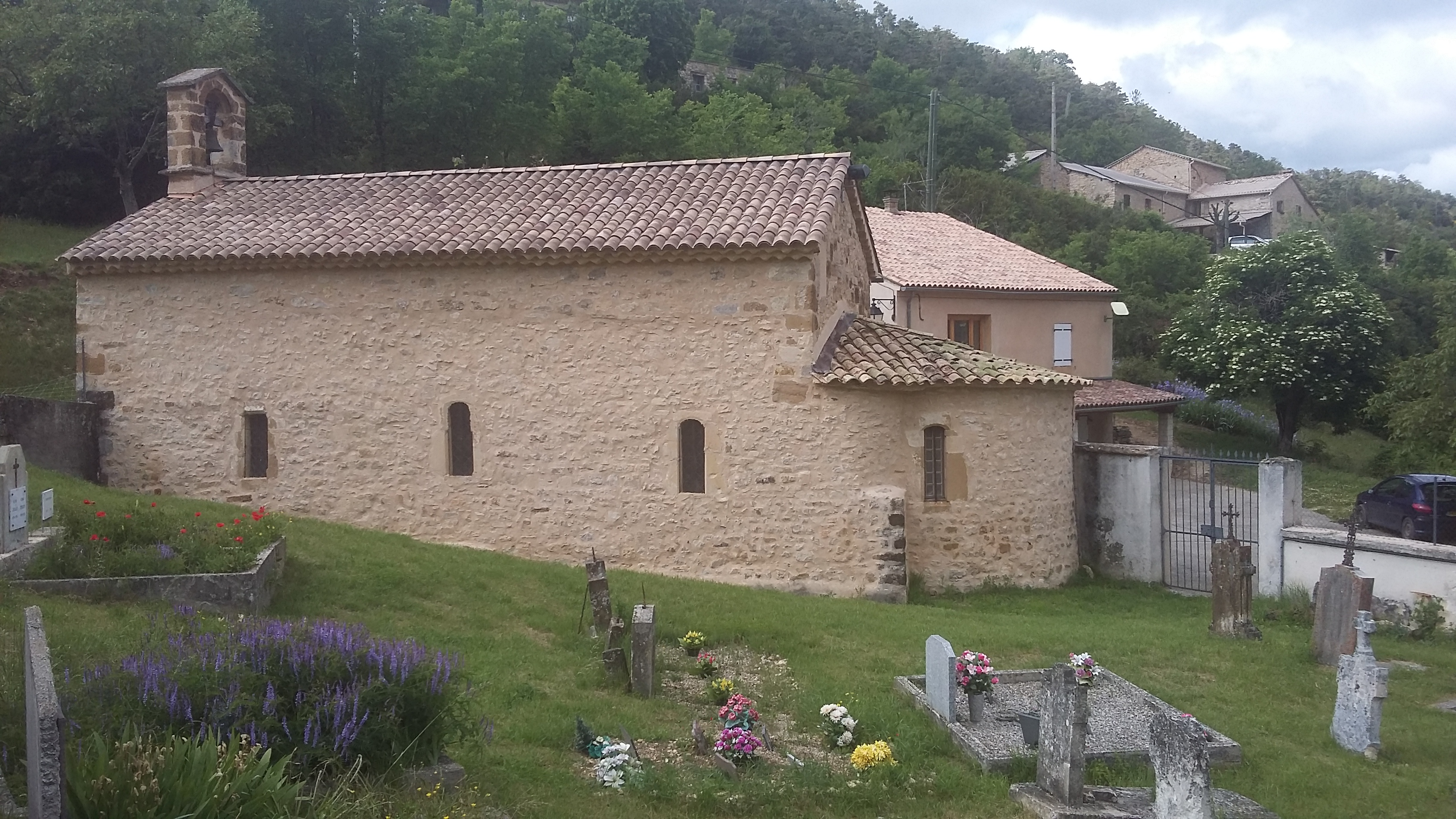
- The church of Roussieux
- Location of Roussieux
- Location within France Location within Auvergne-Rhône-Alpes
- Coordinates: 44°20′02″N 5°28′28″E
- Country: France
- Region: Auvergne-Rhône-Alpes
- Department: Drôme
- Arrondissement: Nyons
- Canton: Nyons et Baronnies

Government
  - Mayor (2020–2026): Didier Giren
- Area^{1}: 9.42 km^{2} (3.64 sq mi)
- Elevation: 879 m (2,884 ft)
- Highest elevation: 1,357 m (4,452 ft)
- Lowest elevation: 580 m (1,900 ft)
- Population (2023): 24
  - Density: 2.5/km^{2} (6.6/sq mi)
- Time zone: UTC+01:00 (CET)
  - Summer (DST): UTC+02:00 (CEST)
- INSEE/Postal code: 26286 /26510
- ^{1} French Land Register data, which excludes lakes, ponds, glaciers > 1 km^{2} (0.386 sq mi or 247 acres) and river estuaries.

Roussieux (French pronunciation: [ʁusjø]) is a commune in the Drôme department in southeastern France.

== Population ==
Historical population
Year	Pop.	±% p.a.
1968	22	—
1975	14	−6.25%
1982	12	−2.18%
1990	14	+1.95%
1999	22	+5.15%
2007	24	+1.09%
2012	23	−0.85%
2017	23	+0.00%
2023	24	+0.71%
Source: INSEE

== See also ==
- Communes of the Drôme department
