= Laborel =

- Commune
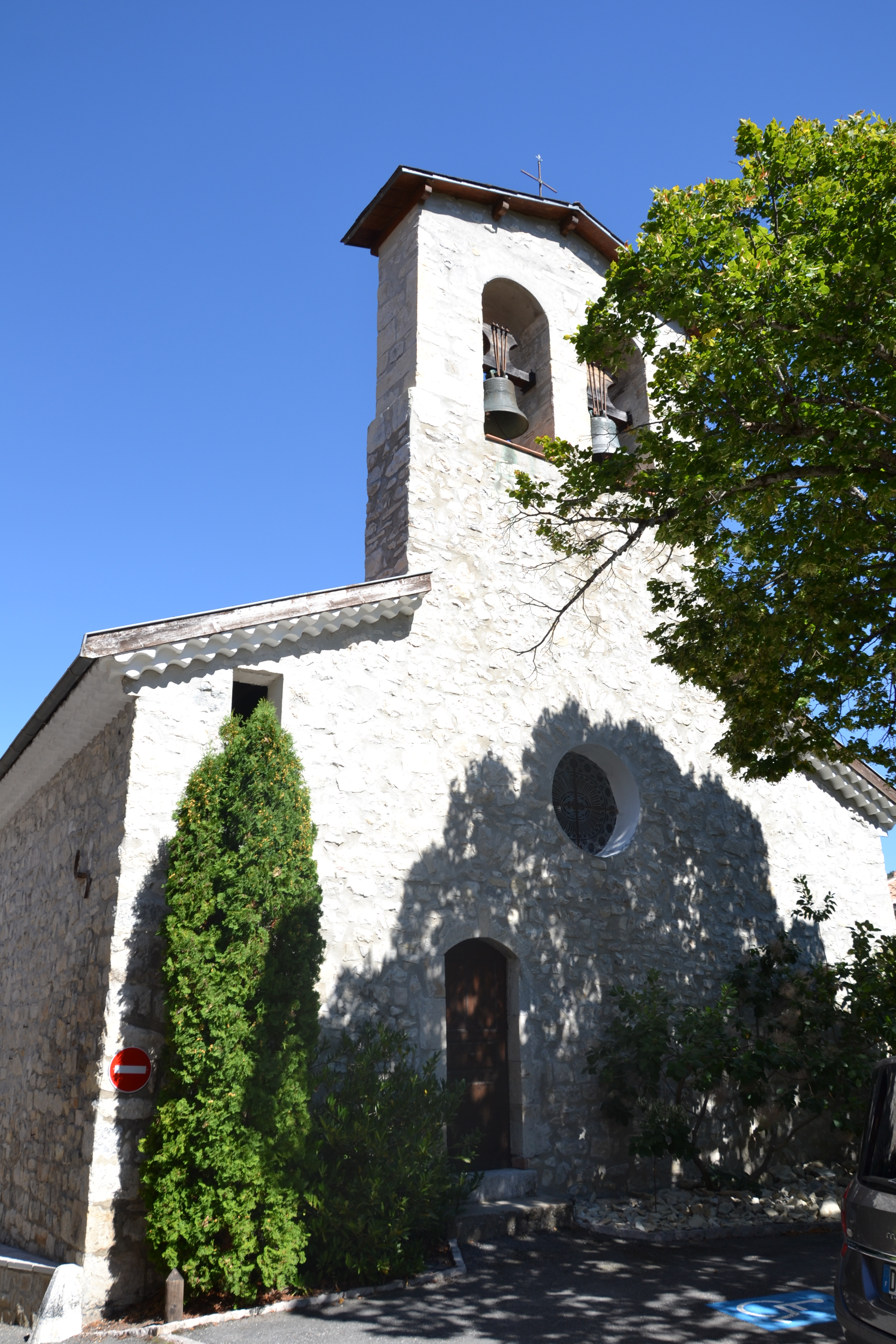
- The church in Laborel
- Location of Laborel
- Location within France Location within Auvergne-Rhône-Alpes
- Coordinates: 44°17′35″N 5°35′45″E
- Country: France
- Region: Auvergne-Rhône-Alpes
- Department: Drôme
- Arrondissement: Nyons
- Canton: Nyons et Baronnies
- Intercommunality: Sisteronais-Buëch

Government
  - Mayor (2020–2026): Renée Maoui
- Area^{1}: 23.91 km^{2} (9.23 sq mi)
- Elevation: 825 m (2,707 ft)
- Highest elevation: 1,520 m (4,990 ft)
- Lowest elevation: 742 m (2,434 ft)
- Population (2023): 116
  - Density: 4.85/km^{2} (12.6/sq mi)
- Time zone: UTC+01:00 (CET)
  - Summer (DST): UTC+02:00 (CEST)
- INSEE/Postal code: 26153 /26560
- ^{1} French Land Register data, which excludes lakes, ponds, glaciers > 1 km^{2} (0.386 sq mi or 247 acres) and river estuaries.

Laborel (French pronunciation: [labɔʁɛl]; Occitan: Laborèl) is a commune in the Drôme department in southeastern France.

Its inhabitants are called Laborelois in French.

== Population ==
Historical population
Year	Pop.	±% p.a.
1968	110	—
1975	94	−2.22%
1982	102	+1.17%
1990	123	+2.37%
1999	112	−1.04%
2007	99	−1.53%
2012	110	+2.13%
2017	102	−1.50%
2023	116	+2.17%
Source: INSEE

== See also ==
- Communes of the Drôme department
