= Barret-de-Lioure =

- Commune
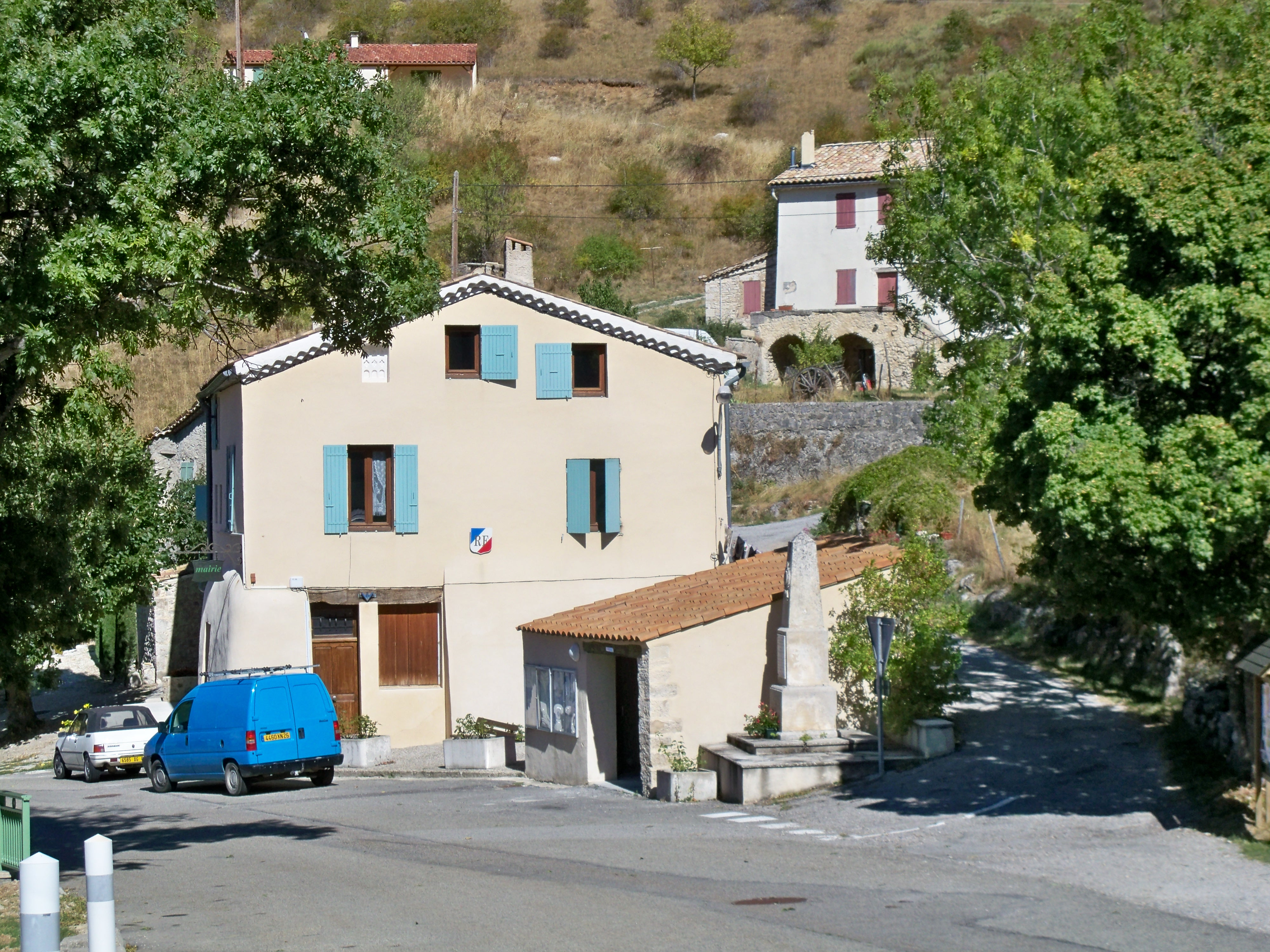
- Town hall

- Coat of arms
- Location of Barret-de-Lioure
- Location within France Location within Auvergne-Rhône-Alpes
- Coordinates: 44°11′13″N 5°29′39″E
- Country: France
- Region: Auvergne-Rhône-Alpes
- Department: Drôme
- Arrondissement: Nyons
- Canton: Nyons et Baronnies

Government
  - Mayor (2020–2026): Ginès Achat
- Area^{1}: 34.64 km^{2} (13.37 sq mi)
- Highest elevation: 1,440 m (4,720 ft)
- Lowest elevation: 708 m (2,323 ft)
- Population (2023): 72
  - Density: 2.1/km^{2} (5.4/sq mi)
- Time zone: UTC+01:00 (CET)
  - Summer (DST): UTC+02:00 (CEST)
- INSEE/Postal code: 26026 /26570
- ^{1} French Land Register data, which excludes lakes, ponds, glaciers > 1 km^{2} (0.386 sq mi or 247 acres) and river estuaries.

Barret-de-Lioure (French pronunciation: [baʁɛ də ljuʁ]; Occitan: Barret de Liura) is a commune in the Drôme department in southeastern France.

== Population ==
Historical population
Year	Pop.	±% p.a.
1968	52	—
1975	34	−5.89%
1982	43	+3.41%
1990	42	−0.29%
1999	47	+1.26%
2007	75	+6.02%
2012	80	+1.30%
2017	74	−1.55%
2023	72	−0.46%
Source: INSEE

== See also ==
- Communes of the Drôme department
