= Rémuzat =

- Commune
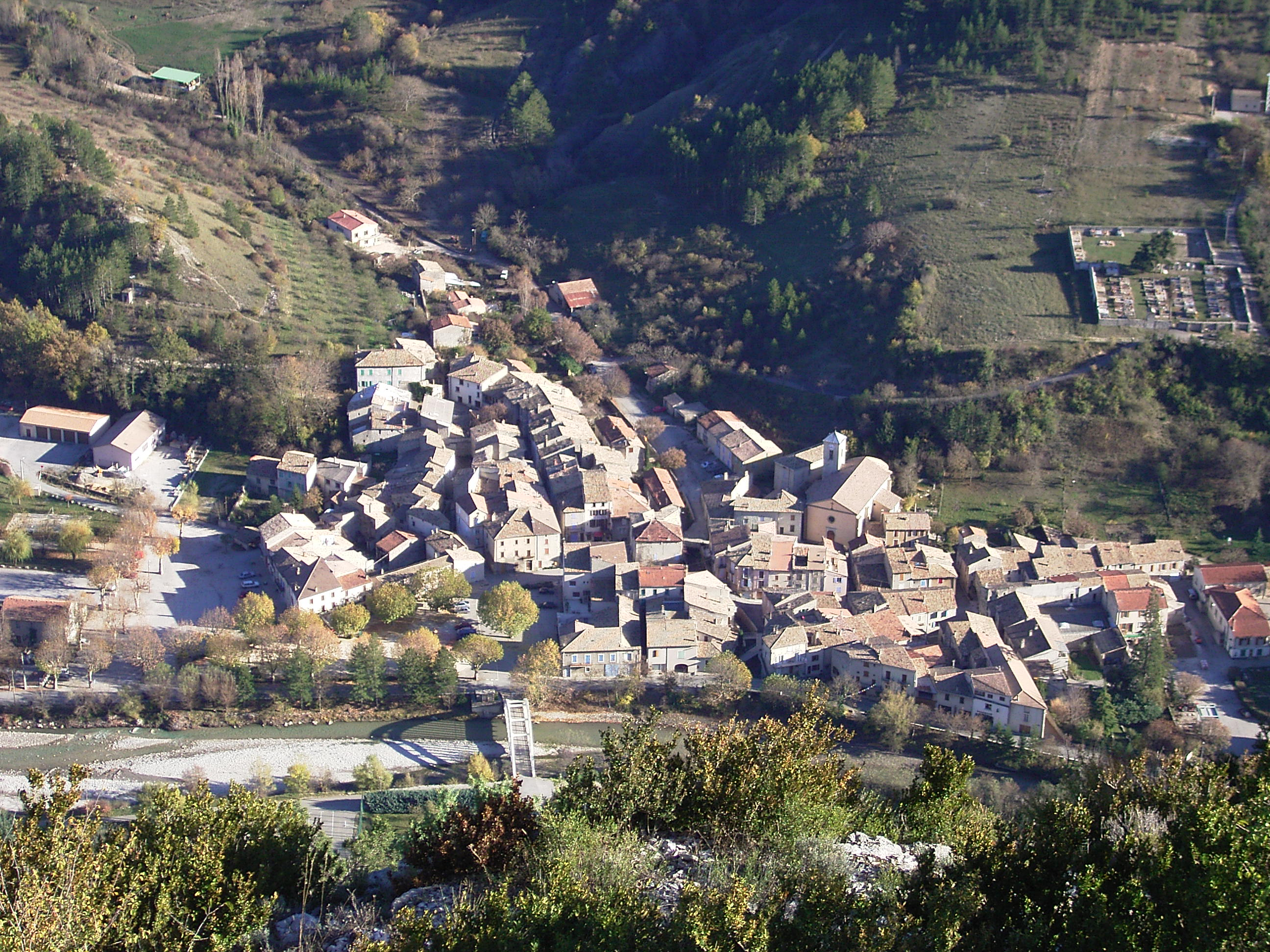
- A view of Rémuzat from the nearby hillside

- Coat of arms
- Location of Rémuzat
- Location within France Location within Auvergne-Rhône-Alpes
- Coordinates: 44°24′51″N 5°21′25″E
- Country: France
- Region: Auvergne-Rhône-Alpes
- Department: Drôme
- Arrondissement: Nyons
- Canton: Nyons et Baronnies

Government
  - Mayor (2020–2026): Olivier Salin
- Area^{1}: 16.78 km^{2} (6.48 sq mi)
- Highest elevation: 1,201 m (3,940 ft)
- Lowest elevation: 425 m (1,394 ft)
- Population (2023): 318
  - Density: 19.0/km^{2} (49.1/sq mi)
- Time zone: UTC+01:00 (CET)
  - Summer (DST): UTC+02:00 (CEST)
- INSEE/Postal code: 26264 /26510
- ^{1} French Land Register data, which excludes lakes, ponds, glaciers > 1 km^{2} (0.386 sq mi or 247 acres) and river estuaries.

Rémuzat (French pronunciation: [ʁemyza]; Vivaro-Alpine: Remusat) is a commune in the Drôme department in southeastern France.

== Population ==
Historical population
Year	Pop.	±% p.a.
1968	301	—
1975	332	+1.41%
1982	364	+1.32%
1990	364	+0.00%
1999	283	−2.76%
2007	313	+1.27%
2012	331	+1.12%
2017	343	+0.71%
2023	318	−1.25%
Source: INSEE

== Sights ==
- The Rocher du Caire, a large cliff inhabited by griffon vultures.

== See also ==
- Communes of the Drôme department
