= Arrondissements of the Drôme department =

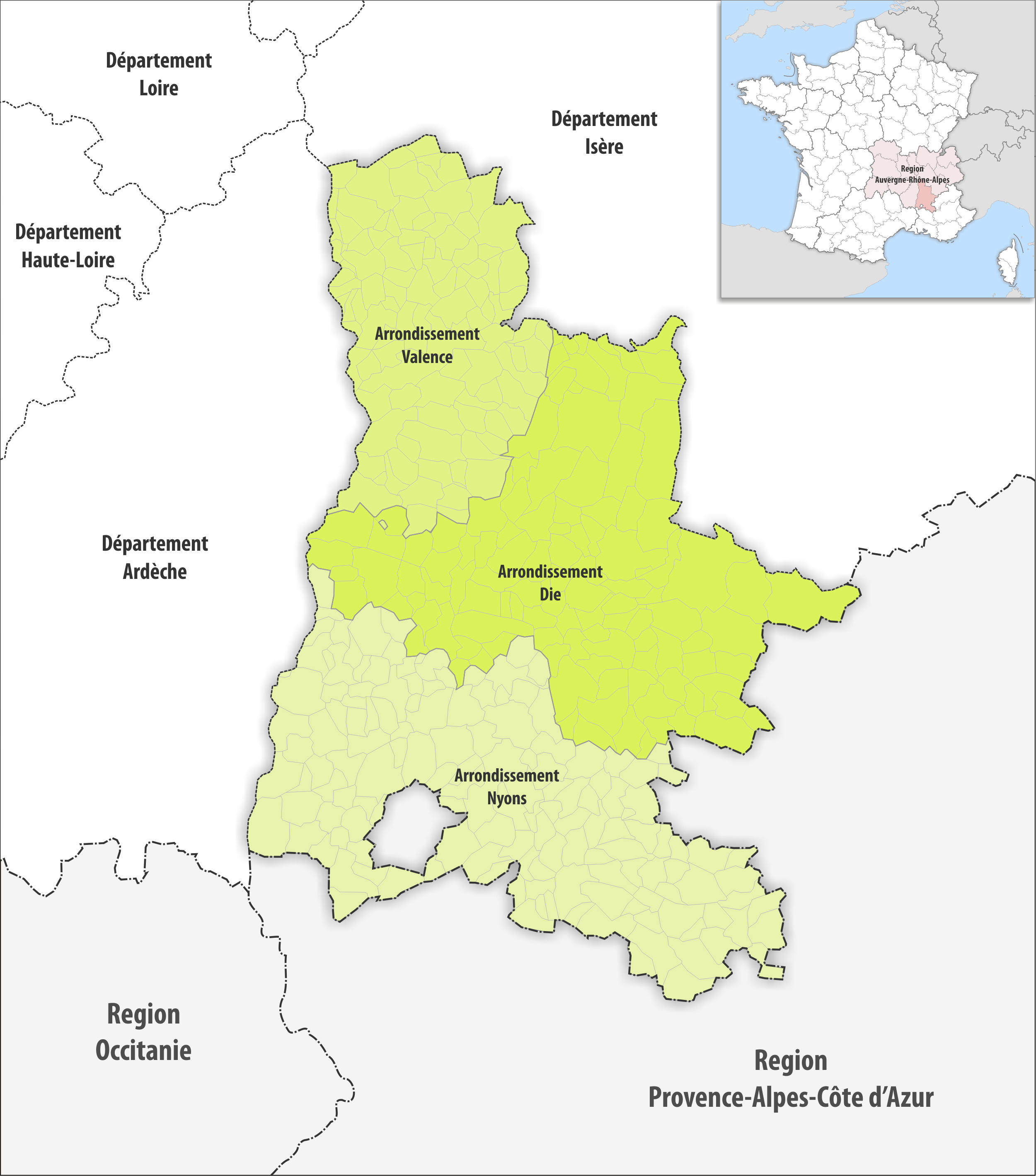
Map of arrondissements of the Drôme department.

The 3 arrondissements of the Drôme department are:

1. Arrondissement of Die, (subprefecture: Die) with 112 communes. The population of the arrondissement was 68,574 in 2021.
2. Arrondissement of Nyons, (subprefecture: Nyons) with 150 communes. The population of the arrondissement was 152,789 in 2021.
3. Arrondissement of Valence, (prefecture of the Drôme department: Valence) with 101 communes. The population of the arrondissement was 298,095 in 2021.

== History ==
In 1800 the arrondissements of Valence, Die, Montélimar and Nyons were established. The arrondissement of Montélimar was disbanded in 1926. In 2006 the four cantons of Dieulefit, Marsanne, Montélimar-1 and Montélimar-2 that previously belonged to the arrondissement of Valence were assigned to the arrondissement of Nyons.

The borders of the arrondissements of Drôme were modified in January 2017:

- six communes from the arrondissement of Die to the arrondissement of Nyons
- one commune from the arrondissement of Die to the arrondissement of Valence
- 17 communes from the arrondissement of Valence to the arrondissement of Die
- one commune from the arrondissement of Valence to the arrondissement of Nyons
