= Reilhanette =

- Commune
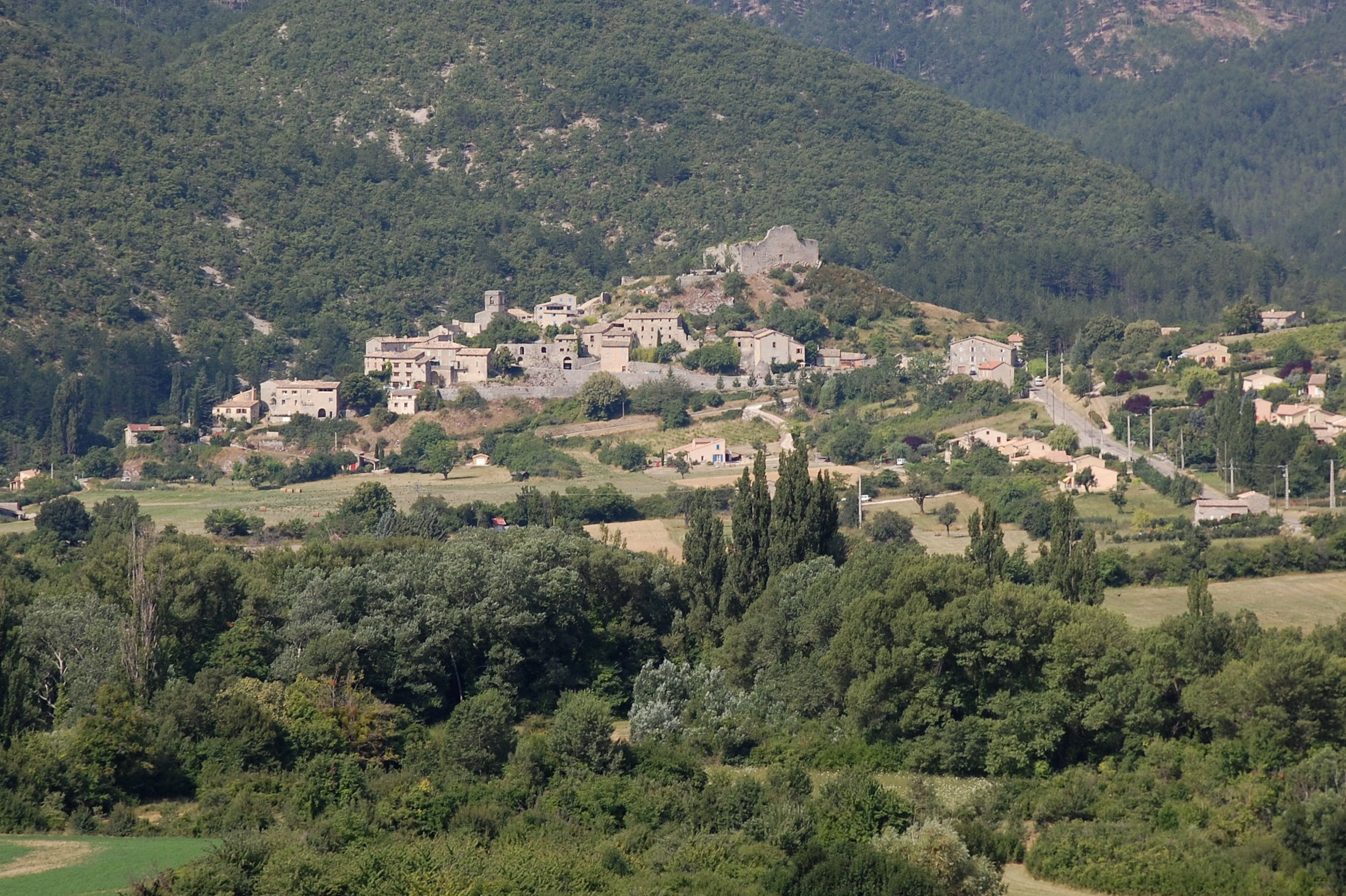
- A general view of Reilhanette
- Location of Reilhanette
- Location within France Location within Auvergne-Rhône-Alpes
- Coordinates: 44°10′11″N 5°25′15″E
- Country: France
- Region: Auvergne-Rhône-Alpes
- Department: Drôme
- Arrondissement: Nyons
- Canton: Nyons et Baronnies

Government
  - Mayor (2020–2026): Martial Bonnefoy
- Area^{1}: 14.78 km^{2} (5.71 sq mi)
- Elevation: 568 m (1,864 ft)
- Highest elevation: 1,313 m (4,308 ft)
- Lowest elevation: 512 m (1,680 ft)
- Population (2023): 107
  - Density: 7.24/km^{2} (18.8/sq mi)
- Time zone: UTC+01:00 (CET)
  - Summer (DST): UTC+02:00 (CEST)
- INSEE/Postal code: 26263 /26570
- ^{1} French Land Register data, which excludes lakes, ponds, glaciers > 1 km^{2} (0.386 sq mi or 247 acres) and river estuaries.

Reilhanette (French pronunciation: [ʁɛjanɛt]) is a commune in the Drôme department in southeastern France.

== Population ==
Historical population
Year	Pop.	±% p.a.
1968	101	—
1975	103	+0.28%
1982	114	+1.46%
1990	130	+1.66%
1999	119	−0.98%
2007	147	+2.68%
2012	134	−1.83%
2017	144	+1.45%
2023	107	−4.83%
Source: INSEE

== See also ==
- Communes of the Drôme department
