= Montferrand-la-Fare =

- Commune
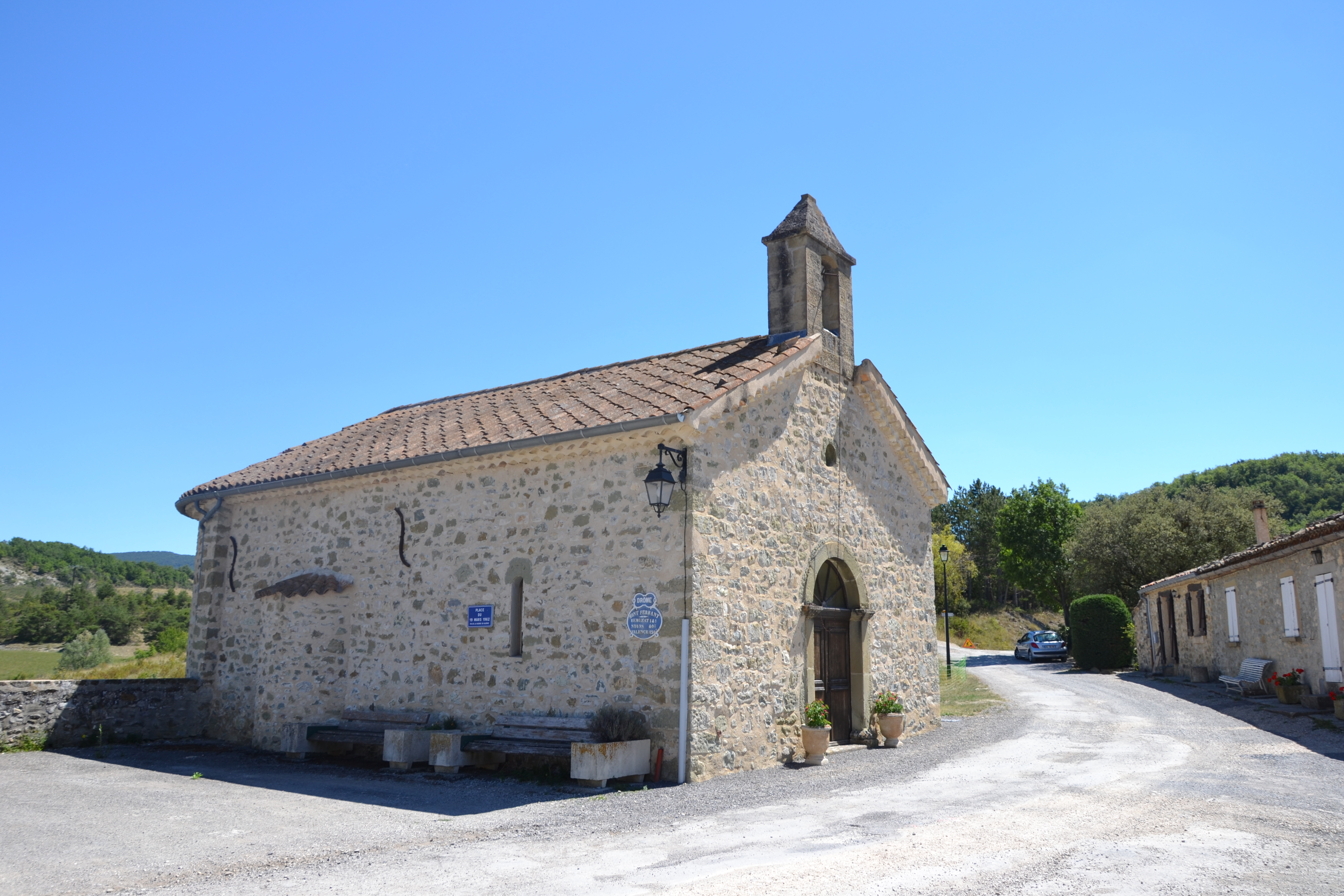
- The church in Montferrand-la-Fare
- Location of Montferrand-la-Fare
- Location within France Location within Auvergne-Rhône-Alpes
- Coordinates: 44°21′39″N 5°27′01″E
- Country: France
- Region: Auvergne-Rhône-Alpes
- Department: Drôme
- Arrondissement: Nyons
- Canton: Nyons et Baronnies

Government
  - Mayor (2020–2026): Sylvie Garnero
- Area^{1}: 11.24 km^{2} (4.34 sq mi)
- Highest elevation: 1,392 m (4,567 ft)
- Lowest elevation: 546 m (1,791 ft)
- Population (2023): 27
  - Density: 2.4/km^{2} (6.2/sq mi)
- Time zone: UTC+01:00 (CET)
  - Summer (DST): UTC+02:00 (CEST)
- INSEE/Postal code: 26199 /26510
- ^{1} French Land Register data, which excludes lakes, ponds, glaciers > 1 km^{2} (0.386 sq mi or 247 acres) and river estuaries.

Montferrand-la-Fare (French pronunciation: [mɔ̃fɛʁɑ̃ la faʁ]; Occitan: Montferrand e La Fara) is a commune in the Drôme department in southeastern France.

== Population ==
Historical population
| Year | Pop. | ±% p.a. |
|---|---|---|
| 1968 | 43 | — |
| 1975 | 46 | +0.97% |
| 1982 | 35 | −3.83% |
| 1990 | 32 | −1.11% |
| 1999 | 46 | +4.11% |
| 2007 | 52 | +1.54% |
| 2012 | 36 | −7.09% |
| 2017 | 29 | −4.23% |
| 2023 | 27 | −1.18% |
Source: INSEE

== See also ==
- Communes of the Drôme department
