= Aulan =

- Commune
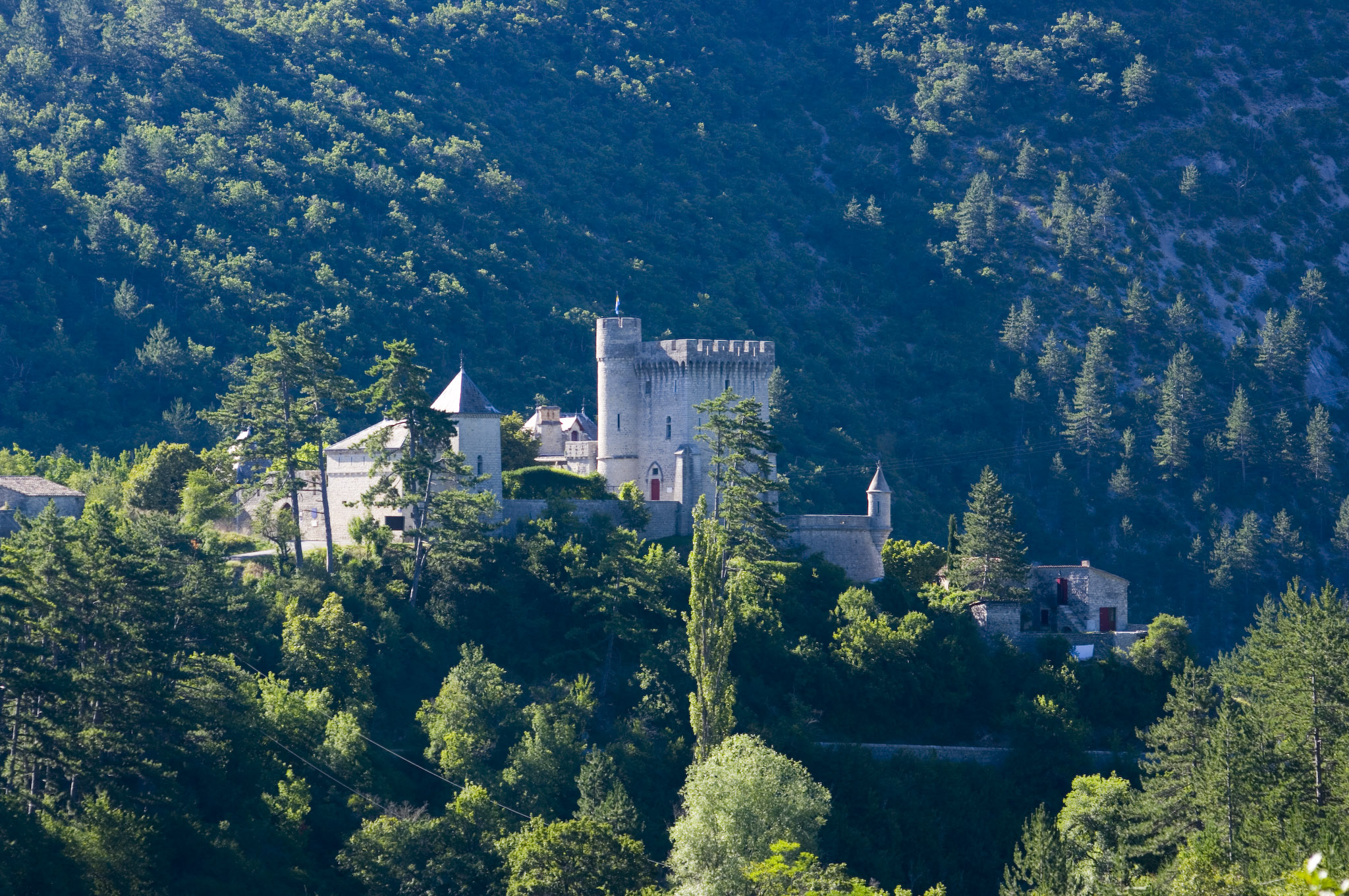
- Chateau
- Location of Aulan
- Location within France Location within Auvergne-Rhône-Alpes
- Coordinates: 44°13′23″N 5°25′44″E
- Country: France
- Region: Auvergne-Rhône-Alpes
- Department: Drôme
- Arrondissement: Nyons
- Canton: Nyons et Baronnies
- Intercommunality: Baronnies en Drôme Provençale

Government
  - Mayor (2020–2026): Annie Feuillas
- Area^{1}: 10.55 km^{2} (4.07 sq mi)
- Highest elevation: 1,122 m (3,681 ft)
- Lowest elevation: 720 m (2,360 ft)
- Population (2023): 8
  - Density: 0.76/km^{2} (2.0/sq mi)
- Time zone: UTC+01:00 (CET)
  - Summer (DST): UTC+02:00 (CEST)
- INSEE/Postal code: 26018 /26570
- ^{1} French Land Register data, which excludes lakes, ponds, glaciers > 1 km^{2} (0.386 sq mi or 247 acres) and river estuaries.

Aulan (French pronunciation: [olɑ̃]; Occitan: Aulanc) is a commune in the Drôme department in southeastern France.

== Population ==
Historical population
Year	Pop.	±% p.a.
1968	8	—
1975	10	+3.24%
1982	11	+1.37%
1990	5	−9.39%
1999	5	+0.00%
2007	4	−2.75%
2012	7	+11.84%
2017	11	+9.46%
2023	8	−5.17%
Source: INSEE

== See also ==
- Communes of the Drôme department
