= Lemps, Drôme =

Lemps
- Commune
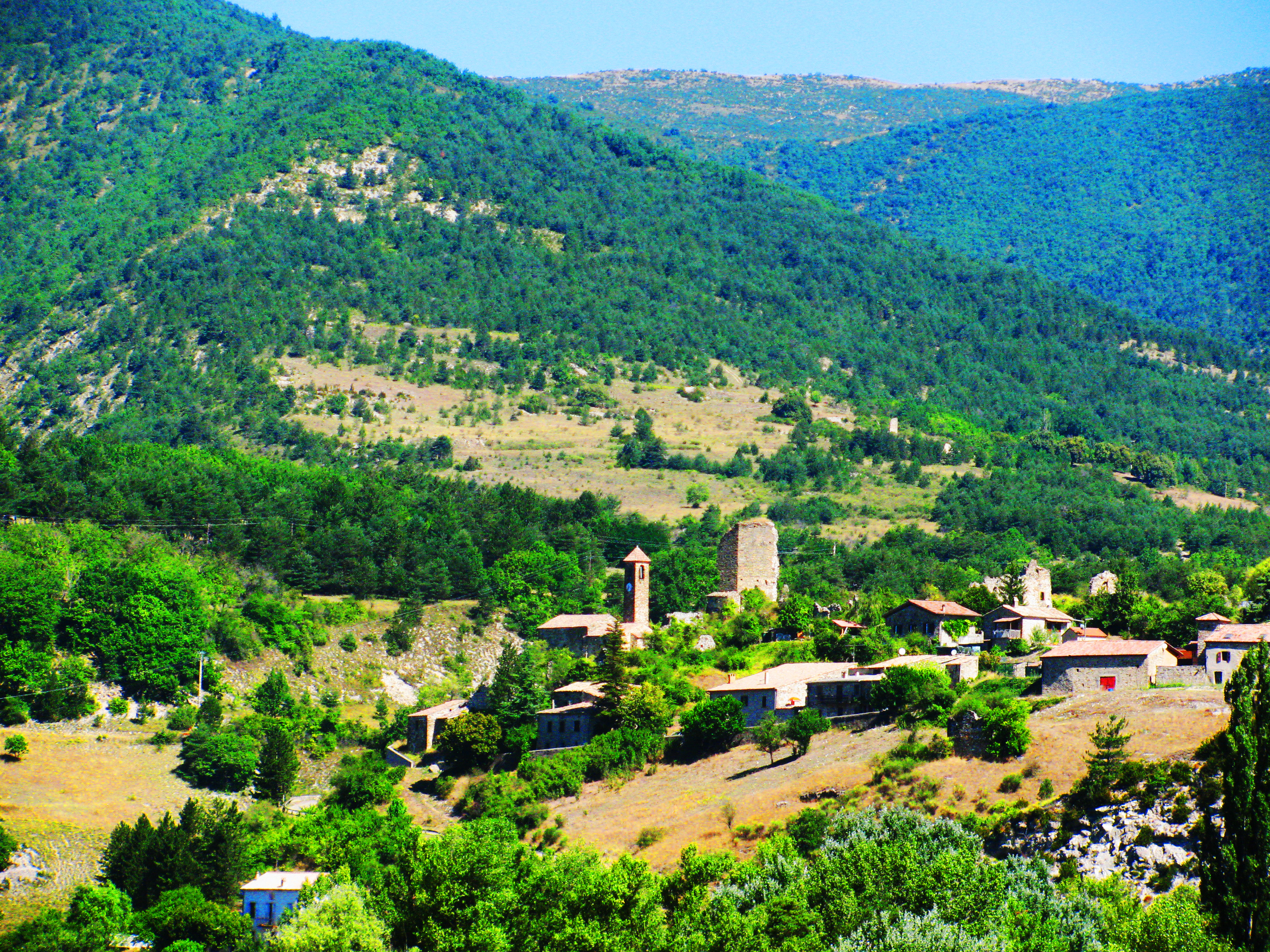
- A general view of Lemps

- Coat of arms
- Location of Lemps
- Location within France Location within Auvergne-Rhône-Alpes
- Coordinates: 44°21′07″N 5°25′11″E
- Country: France
- Region: Auvergne-Rhône-Alpes
- Department: Drôme
- Arrondissement: Nyons
- Canton: Nyons et Baronnies

Government
  - Mayor (2020–2026): Brigitte Duc
- Area^{1}: 16.04 km^{2} (6.19 sq mi)
- Elevation: 774 m (2,539 ft)
- Highest elevation: 1,392 m (4,567 ft)
- Lowest elevation: 536 m (1,759 ft)
- Population (2023): 40
  - Density: 2.5/km^{2} (6.5/sq mi)
- Time zone: UTC+01:00 (CET)
  - Summer (DST): UTC+02:00 (CEST)
- INSEE/Postal code: 26161 /26510
- ^{1} French Land Register data, which excludes lakes, ponds, glaciers > 1 km^{2} (0.386 sq mi or 247 acres) and river estuaries.

Lemps is a commune in the Drôme department in southeastern France.

== Population ==
Historical population
Year	Pop.	±% p.a.
1968	74	—
1975	41	−8.09%
1982	50	+2.88%
1990	43	−1.87%
1999	44	+0.26%
2007	42	−0.58%
2012	45	+1.39%
2017	50	+2.13%
2023	40	−3.65%
Source: INSEE

== See also ==
- Communes of the Drôme department
