= Sahune =

- Commune
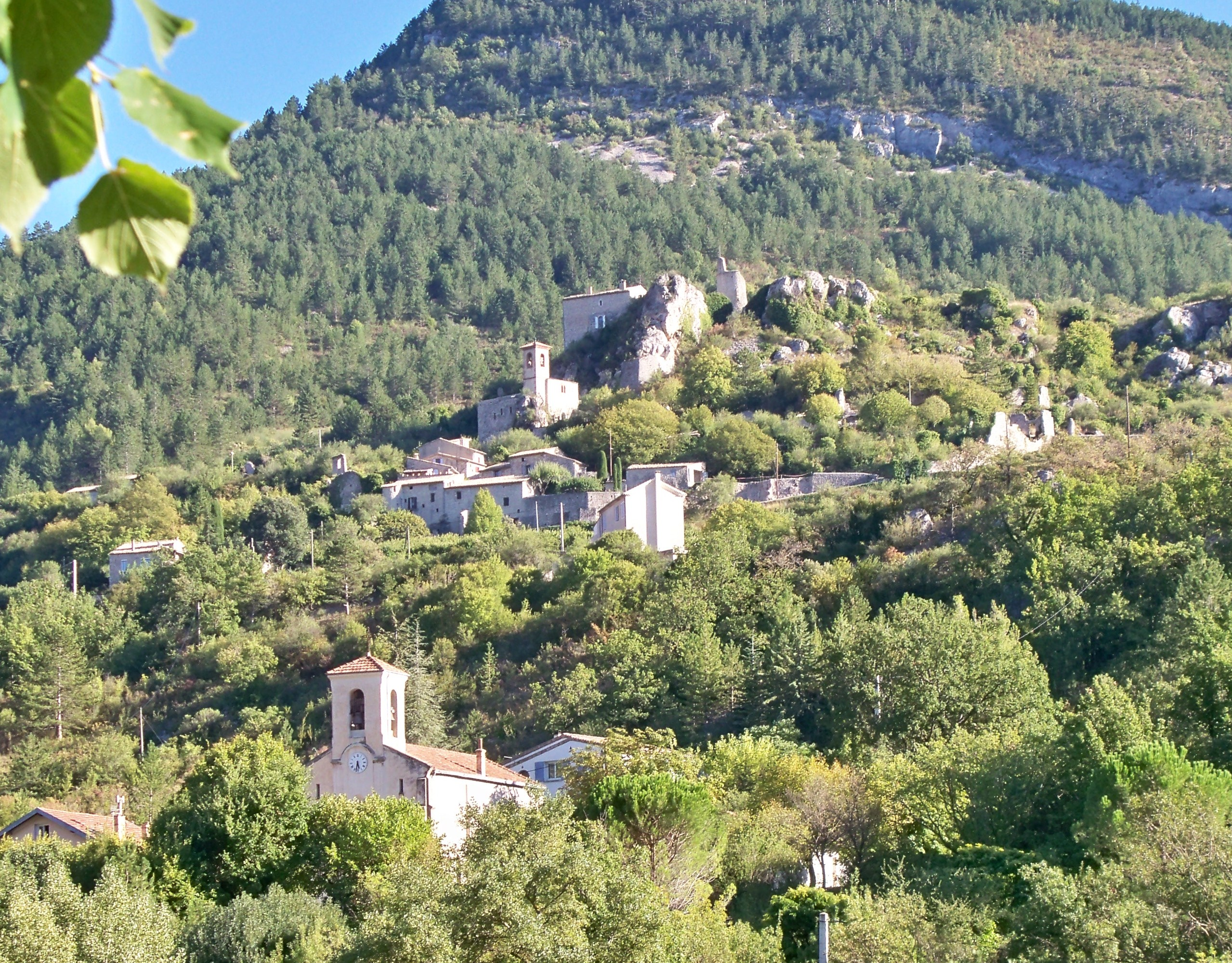
- A view of the church and the old village
- Location of Sahune
- Location within France Location within Auvergne-Rhône-Alpes
- Coordinates: 44°24′56″N 5°16′05″E
- Country: France
- Region: Auvergne-Rhône-Alpes
- Department: Drôme
- Arrondissement: Nyons
- Canton: Nyons et Baronnies

Government
  - Mayor (2020–2026): Marc Bompard
- Area^{1}: 16.55 km^{2} (6.39 sq mi)
- Elevation: 361 m (1,184 ft)
- Highest elevation: 1,000 m (3,300 ft)
- Lowest elevation: 331 m (1,086 ft)
- Population (2023): 301
  - Density: 18.2/km^{2} (47.1/sq mi)
- Time zone: UTC+01:00 (CET)
  - Summer (DST): UTC+02:00 (CEST)
- INSEE/Postal code: 26288 /26510
- ^{1} French Land Register data, which excludes lakes, ponds, glaciers > 1 km^{2} (0.386 sq mi or 247 acres) and river estuaries.

Sahune (French pronunciation: [sa.yn]; Vivaro-Alpine: Saüna) is a commune in the Drôme department in southeastern France.

== Population ==
Historical population
Year	Pop.	±% p.a.
1968	229	—
1975	242	+0.79%
1982	275	+1.84%
1990	290	+0.67%
1999	292	+0.08%
2007	301	+0.38%
2012	324	+1.48%
2017	313	−0.69%
2023	301	−0.65%
Source: INSEE

== See also ==
- Communes of the Drôme department
