= Montfroc =

- Commune
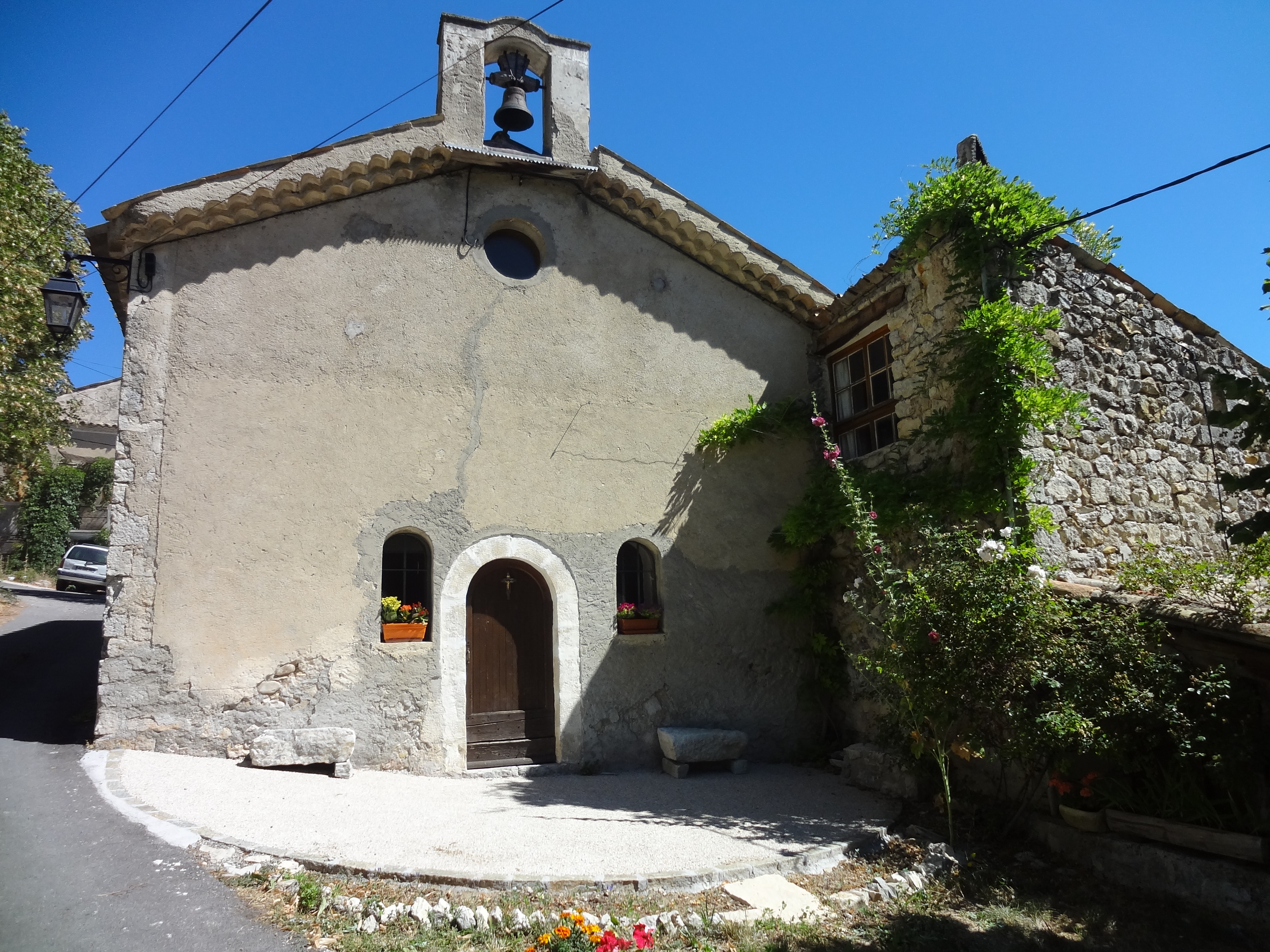
- The church in Montfroc

- Coat of arms
- Location of Montfroc
- Location within France Location within Auvergne-Rhône-Alpes
- Coordinates: 44°10′33″N 5°38′23″E
- Country: France
- Region: Auvergne-Rhône-Alpes
- Department: Drôme
- Arrondissement: Nyons
- Canton: Nyons et Baronnies

Government
  - Mayor (2020–2026): Jean-Noël Pasero
- Area^{1}: 14.76 km^{2} (5.70 sq mi)
- Highest elevation: 1,533 m (5,030 ft)
- Lowest elevation: 732 m (2,402 ft)
- Population (2023): 100
  - Density: 6.8/km^{2} (18/sq mi)
- Time zone: UTC+01:00 (CET)
  - Summer (DST): UTC+02:00 (CEST)
- INSEE/Postal code: 26200 /26560
- ^{1} French Land Register data, which excludes lakes, ponds, glaciers > 1 km^{2} (0.386 sq mi or 247 acres) and river estuaries.

Montfroc (French pronunciation: [mɔ̃fʁɔk]) is a commune in the Drôme department in southeastern France.

== Population ==
Historical population
Year	Pop.	±% p.a.
1968	44	—
1975	45	+0.32%
1982	87	+9.88%
1990	71	−2.51%
1999	57	−2.41%
2007	80	+4.33%
2012	81	+0.25%
2017	75	−1.53%
2023	100	+4.91%
Source: INSEE

== See also ==
- Communes of the Drôme department
