= Chauvac-Laux-Montaux =

- Commune
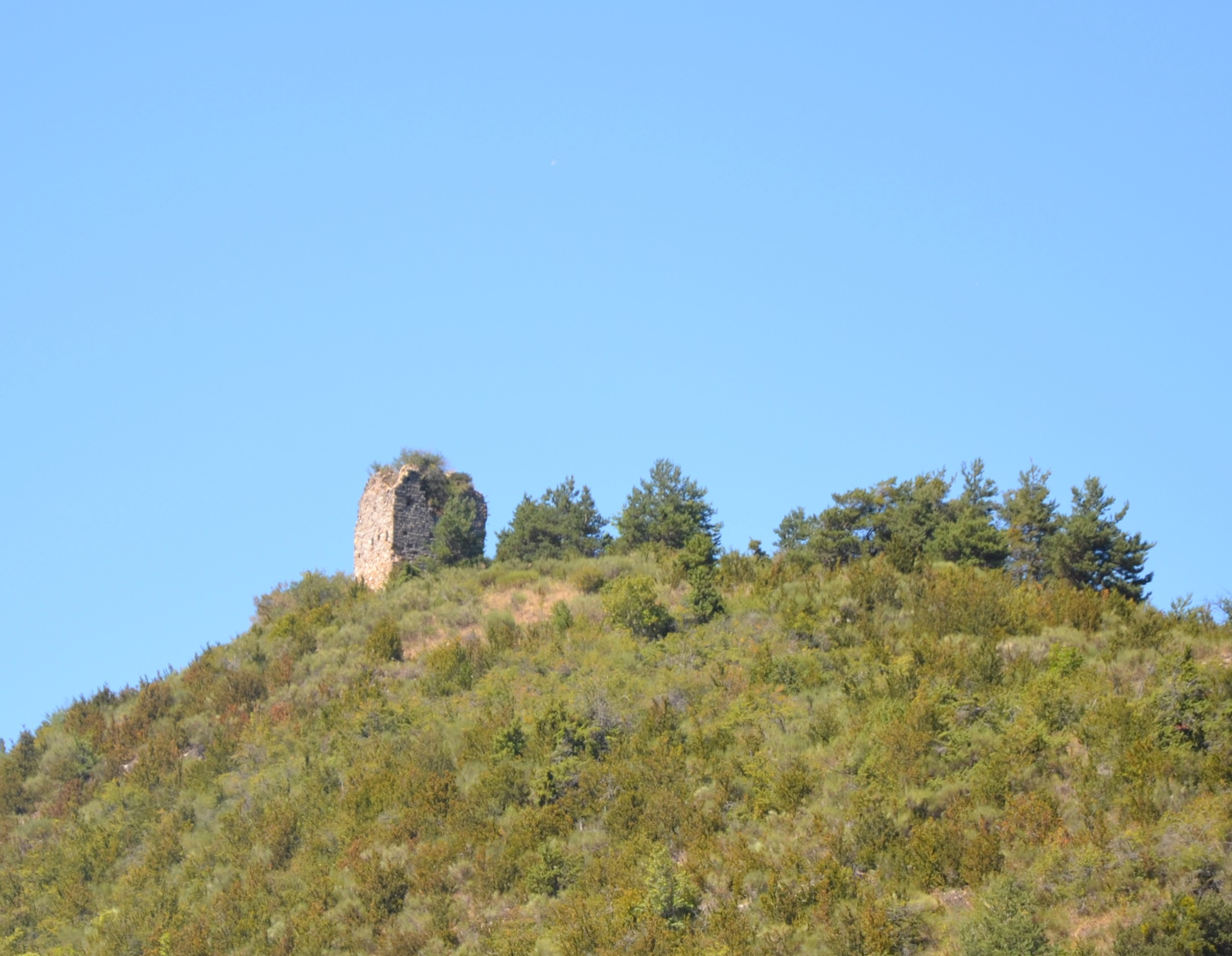
- The tower in Chauvac
- Location of Chauvac-Laux-Montaux
- Location within France Location within Auvergne-Rhône-Alpes
- Coordinates: 44°19′20″N 5°31′35″E
- Country: France
- Region: Auvergne-Rhône-Alpes
- Department: Drôme
- Arrondissement: Nyons
- Canton: Nyons et Baronnies

Government
  - Mayor (2020–2026): Sébastien Roustan
- Area^{1}: 24.24 km^{2} (9.36 sq mi)
- Highest elevation: 1,446 m (4,744 ft)
- Lowest elevation: 632 m (2,073 ft)
- Population (2023): 43
  - Density: 1.8/km^{2} (4.6/sq mi)
- Time zone: UTC+01:00 (CET)
  - Summer (DST): UTC+02:00 (CEST)
- INSEE/Postal code: 26091 /26510
- ^{1} French Land Register data, which excludes lakes, ponds, glaciers > 1 km^{2} (0.386 sq mi or 247 acres) and river estuaries.

Chauvac-Laux-Montaux (French pronunciation: [ʃovak lo mɔ̃to]) is a commune in the Drôme department in southeastern France.

The commune comprises two villages, Chauvac and Le Laux, situated at the foot of the Col de Reychasset. The villages are situated 33 kilometres to the southwest of Serres and 50 kilometres to the east of Nyons.

== Population ==
Historical population
Year	Pop.	±% p.a.
1968	67	—
1975	56	−2.53%
1982	57	+0.25%
1990	53	−0.91%
1999	47	−1.33%
2007	44	−0.82%
2012	44	+0.00%
2017	42	−0.93%
2023	43	+0.39%
Source: INSEE

== See also ==
- Communes of the Drôme department
