= Verclause =

- Commune
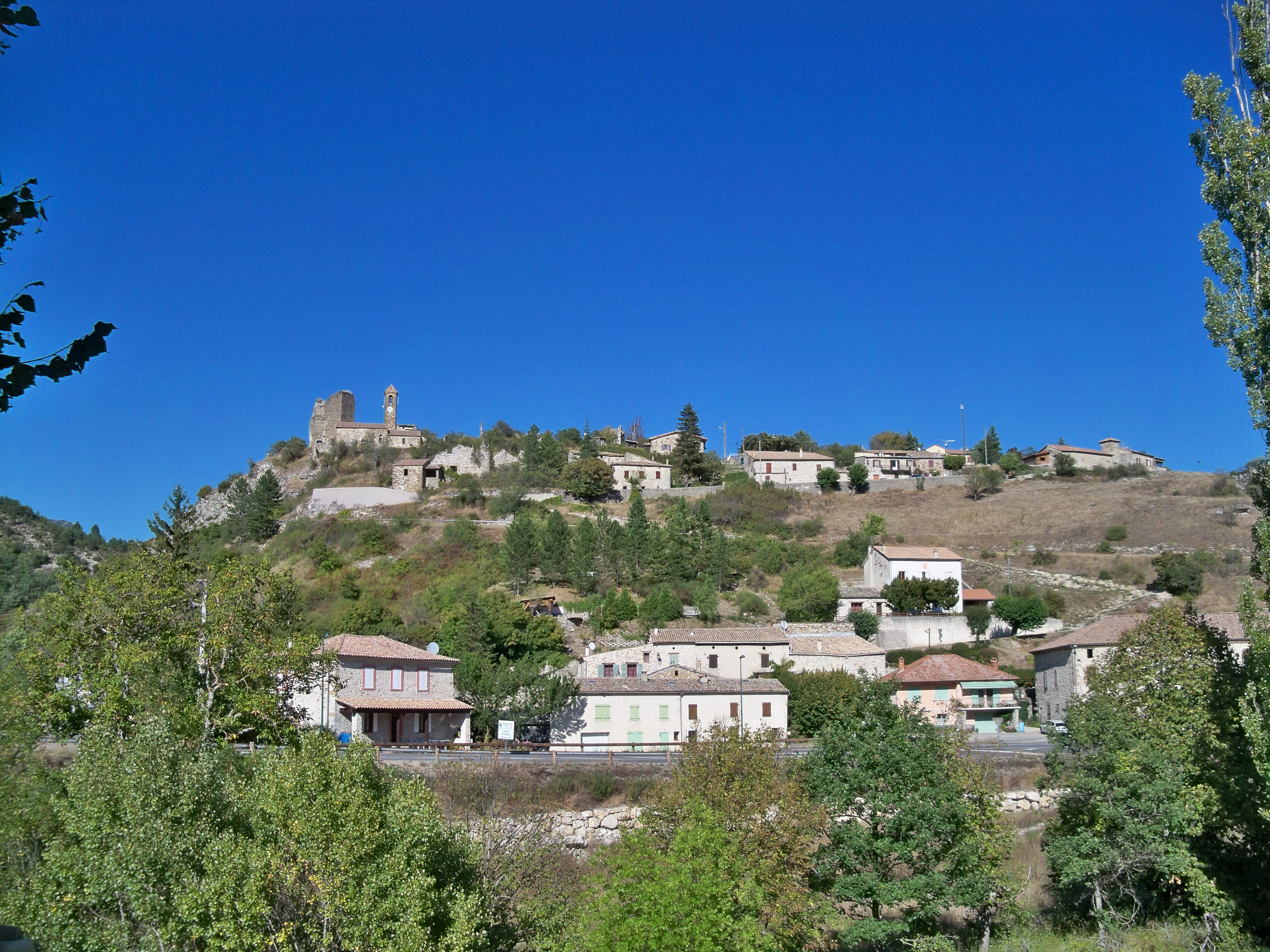
- A general view of Verclause
- Location of Verclause
- Location within France Location within Auvergne-Rhône-Alpes
- Coordinates: 44°22′52″N 5°25′41″E
- Country: France
- Region: Auvergne-Rhône-Alpes
- Department: Drôme
- Arrondissement: Nyons
- Canton: Nyons et Baronnies

Government
  - Mayor (2020–2026): Claude Bas
- Area^{1}: 26.14 km^{2} (10.09 sq mi)
- Elevation: 525 m (1,722 ft)
- Highest elevation: 1,360 m (4,460 ft)
- Lowest elevation: 474 m (1,555 ft)
- Population (2023): 68
  - Density: 2.6/km^{2} (6.7/sq mi)
- Time zone: UTC+01:00 (CET)
  - Summer (DST): UTC+02:00 (CEST)
- INSEE/Postal code: 26369 /26510
- ^{1} French Land Register data, which excludes lakes, ponds, glaciers > 1 km^{2} (0.386 sq mi or 247 acres) and river estuaries.

Verclause (French pronunciation: [vɛʁkloz]; Vivaro-Alpine: Verclausa) is a commune in the Drôme department in southeastern France.

== Population ==
Historical population
Year	Pop.	±% p.a.
1968	68	—
1975	91	+4.25%
1982	68	−4.08%
1990	61	−1.35%
1999	84	+3.62%
2007	81	−0.45%
2012	68	−3.44%
2017	59	−2.80%
2023	68	+2.39%
Source: INSEE

== See also ==
- Communes of the Drôme department
