= Cantons of the Drôme department =

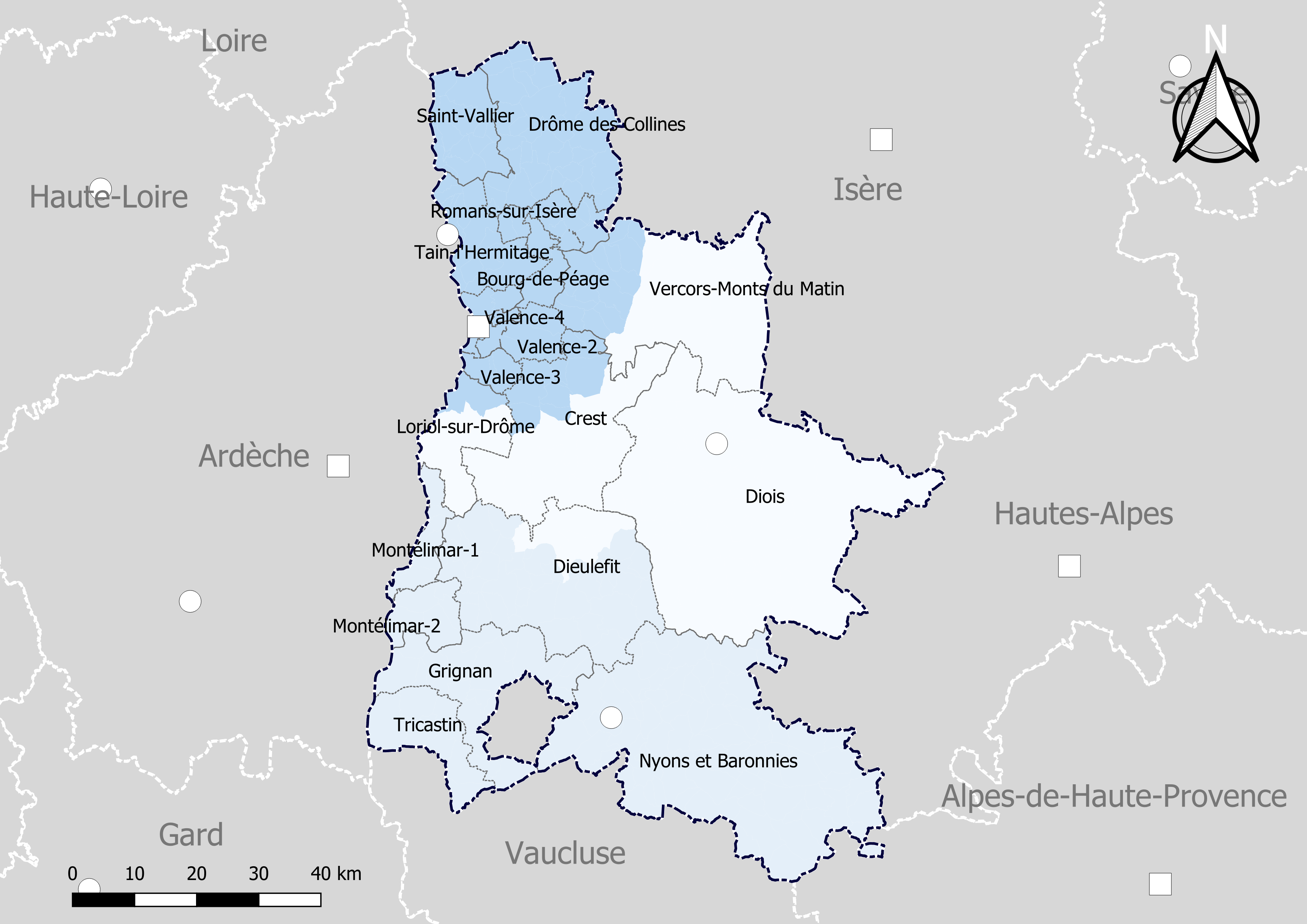
A map of the cantons of Drôme

The following is a list of the 19 cantons of the Drôme department (with their respective seats), in France, following the canton reorganisation that came into effect in March 2015:

- Bourg-de-Péage (Bourg-de-Péage): 2 communes and part of Romans-sur-Isère
- Crest (Crest): 28 communes
- Dieulefit (Dieulefit): 44 communes
- Le Diois (Die): 62 communes
- Drôme des collines (Saint-Donat-sur-l'Herbasse): 31 communes
- Grignan (Grignan): 21 communes
- Loriol-sur-Drôme (Loriol-sur-Drôme): 8 communes
- Montélimar-1 (Montélimar): 5 communes and part of Montélimar
- Montélimar-2 (Montélimar): 4 communes and part of Montélimar
- Nyons et Baronnies (Nyons): 73 communes
- Romans-sur-Isère (Romans-sur-Isère): 8 communes and part of Romans-sur-Isère
- Saint-Vallier (Saint-Vallier): 13 communes
- Tain-l'Hermitage (Tain-l'Hermitage): 14 communes
- Le Tricastin (Pierrelatte): 8 communes
- Valence-1 (Valence): 2 communes and part of Valence
- Valence-2 (Valence): 3 communes and part of Valence
- Valence-3 (Valence): 4 communes and part of Valence
- Valence-4 (Valence): part of Valence
- Vercors-Monts du Matin (Chatuzange-le-Goubet): 30 communes
