= Drôme =

Department in Auvergne-Rhône-Alpes, France

Drôme Droma (Occitan) Drôma (Arpitan)
- Department of France
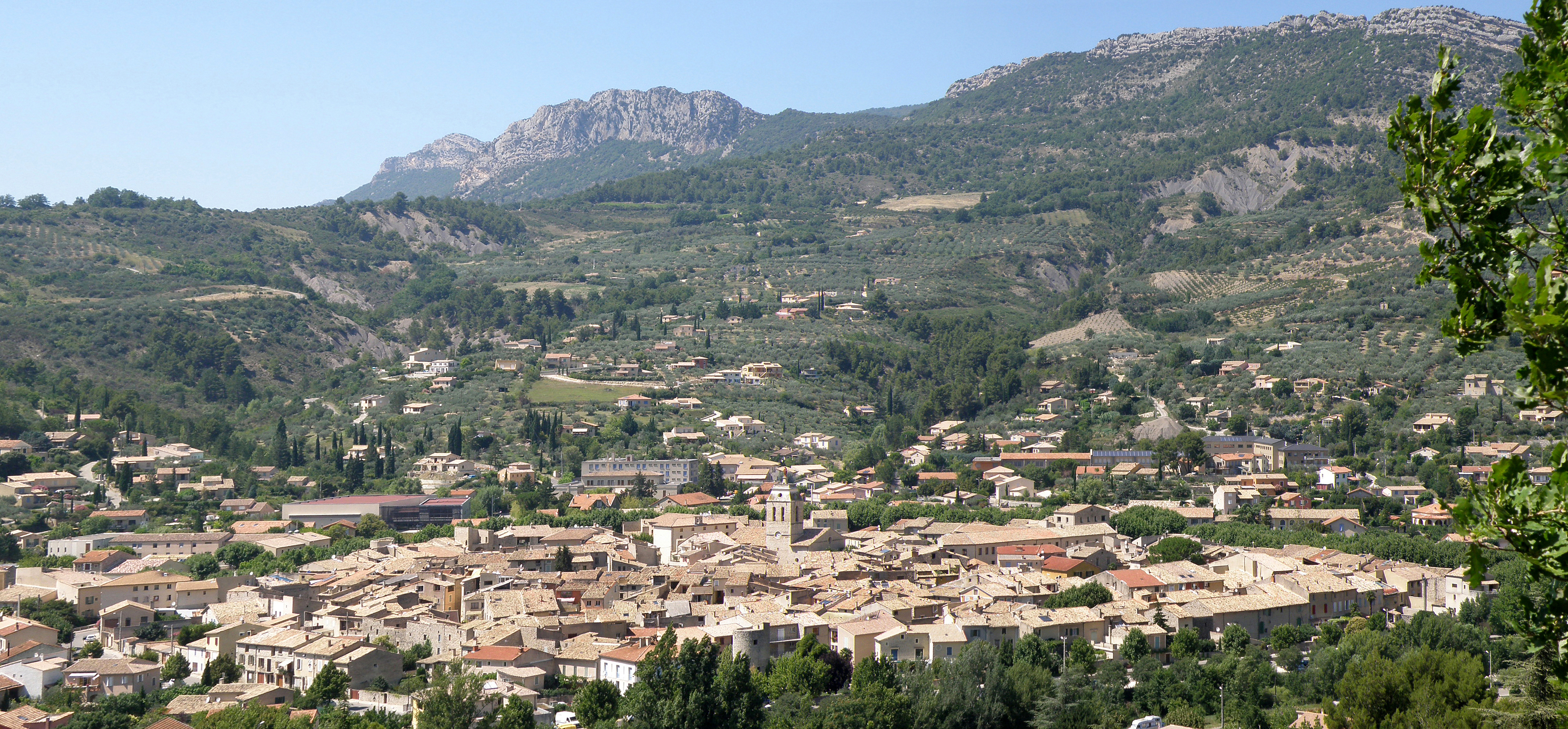
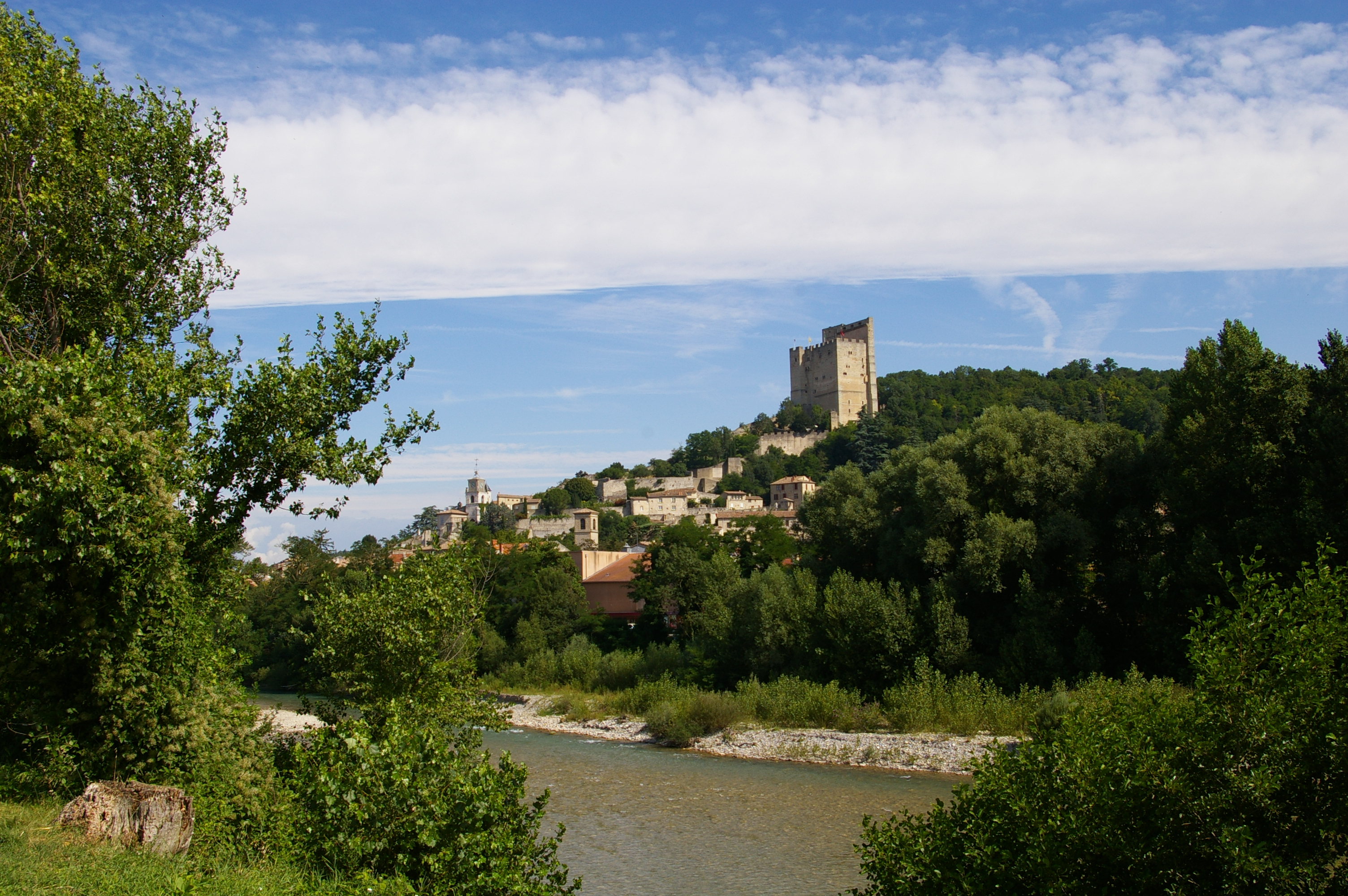
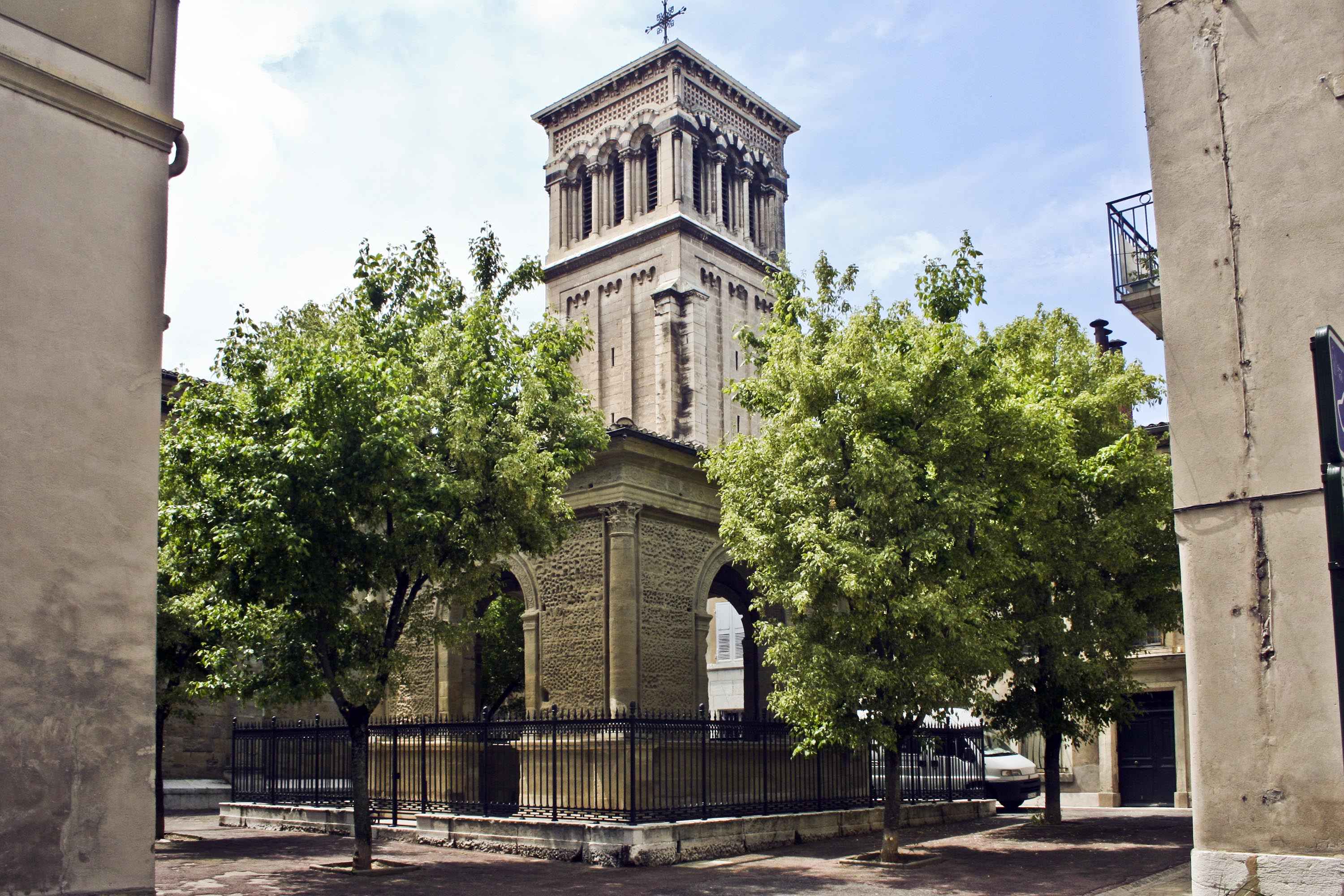
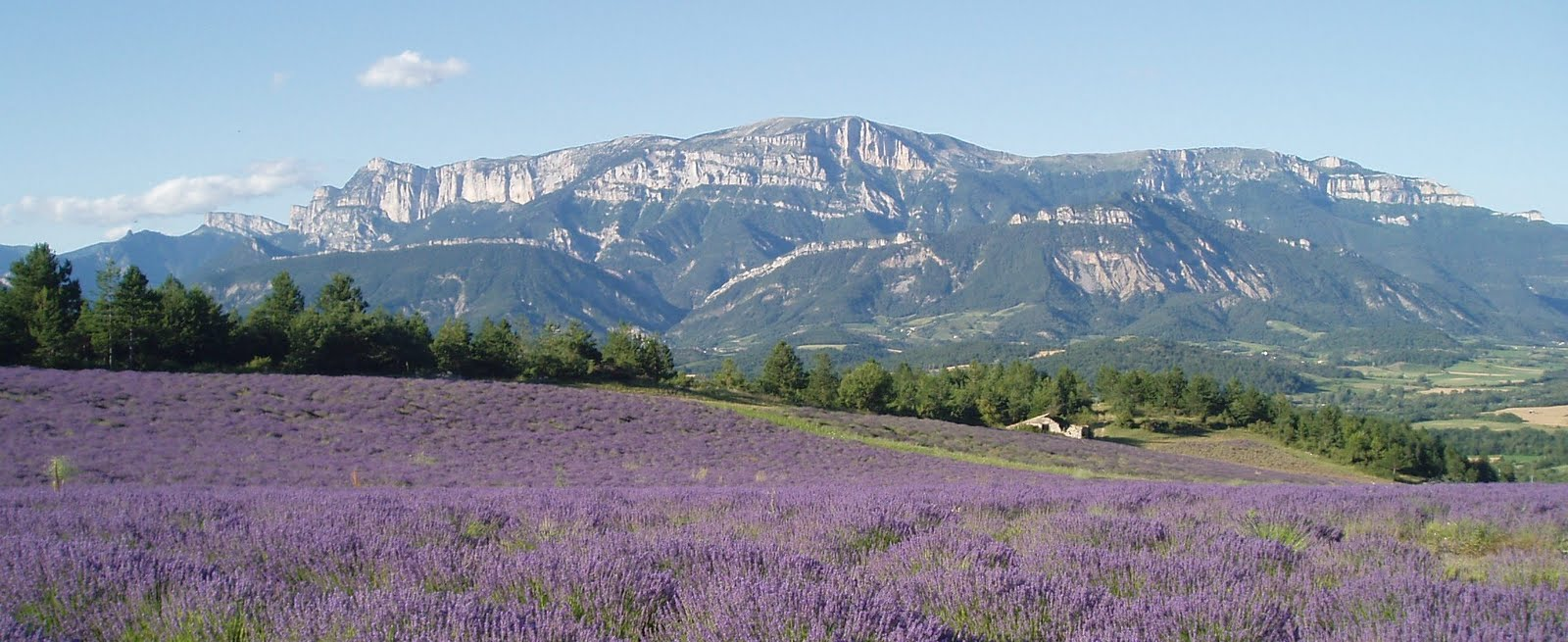
- Clockwise from top: a view of Buis-les-Baronnies, Valence Cathedral, lavender fields in the Vercors Massif, Crest

- Flag Coat of arms

- Location of Drôme in France
- Coordinates: 44°45′N 05°10′E
- Country: France
- Region: Auvergne-Rhône-Alpes
- Prefecture: Valence
- Subprefectures: Die; Nyons

Government
  - President of the Departmental Council: Marie-Pierre Mouton (LR)

Area^{1}
  - Total: 6,530 km^{2} (2,520 sq mi)

Population (2023)
  - Total: 524,207
  - Rank: 52nd
  - Density: 80.3/km^{2} (208/sq mi)
- Time zone: UTC+1 (CET)
  - Summer (DST): UTC+2 (CEST)
- Department number: 26
- Arrondissements: 3
- Cantons: 19
- Communes: 362
- ^1 French Land Register data, which exclude estuaries and lakes, ponds and glaciers larger than 1 km^{2}

Drôme (French pronunciation: [dʁom]; Occitan: Droma; Arpitan: Drôma) is the southernmost department in the Auvergne-Rhône-Alpes region of Southeastern France. Named after the river Drôme, it had a population of 524,207 as of 2023. Drôme's prefecture is Valence.

The southern portion of the Drôme, closest to Provence, is often known as the fr:Drôme Provençale.

== History ==
Saint-Vallier in Drôme was the birthplace of one of France's most famous courtesans, the noble-born Diane de Poitiers (1499–1566), long-term mistress of King Henri II (1519–1559).

The French National Constituent Assembly set up Drôme as one of the original 83 departments of France on March 4, 1790, during the French Revolution. The territory formed part of the former French province of Dauphiné. The original Drôme department contained the exclave of Orange, which was also part of the former province of Dauphiné. In 1792, following the annexation of Comtat Venaissin, Drôme acquired the newly created district of Carpentras while Orange was ceded to Bouches du Rhône. In 1793, the district of Carpentras was ceded to the newly formed department of Vaucluse, giving the Drôme its modern-day borders.

== Geography ==
Drôme lies within the region of Auvergne-Rhône-Alpes. Drôme is bordered by Ardèche to the west, Isère to the north and east, Hautes-Alpes to the east, Alpes-de-Haute-Provence to the southeast and Vaucluse to the south. The northwestern tip of the department is only 3 miles (5 km) from the Loire border.

The boundaries of the department have changed several times with the incorporation of the Comtat Venaissin in 1792 and the creation of the Vaucluse department in 1793. Drôme surrounds an exclave of the Vaucluse department, the Canton of Valréas (Enclave des Papes).

The commune of Montfroc forms a small salient which was surrounded by the department of Alpes-de-Haute-Provence, which is similar to the small salients of Newmarket in Suffolk, Dieveniškės in Lithuania, Bogatynia in Poland, West Bengal and Sikkim in India, and the Wakhan Corridor in Afghanistan. It also the pene-exclave of the department.

The department contains 362 communes. The smallest commune in France, Rochefourchat, with a population only of two persons, is in Drôme.

=== Climate ===
The Drôme department is in a zone of transition between the oceanic climate of Lyon, the continental climate to the north and the Mediterranean climate of Provence to the south. In the Rhône valley, the meeting of the mild humid southern Mediterranean air masses with the colder northern air mass sometimes causes particularly violent thunderstorms and snowstorms.

In the northern hills near Tain-l'Hermitage (15 km north of Valence), the climate is a mixture of oceanic and semi-continental climates. Rainfall occurs throughout the year with the most falling in spring and autumn. The summers are moderated by storms and the mistral does not blow hard. Saint-Donat-sur-l'Herbasse has a moderate temperature of 3 °C in January and 21 °C in July due to the Lyonnic climate, where more precipitation falls in summer than winter.

The influence of the mountains is evident in the east. In the Vercors Plateau, the mountain climate is wet due to the oceanic influences from the north. The average annual temperature at Lus la Croix Haute at altitude 1061m is 7.3 °C and the annual rainfall is 1,051 mm (41.4 in). The Diois (southern Vercors) and the Baronnies are dry regions due to the Mediterranean climate. The mistral is less influential here and this region has minimal rainfall. The lowest temperatures in January at Nyons is 0.3 °C but 1.4 °C at Pierrelatte.

The Valence plane is a transition zone between the Mediterranean influence and the northern cold climate. Summers are warmer than in the northern regions, and the increase in sunlight and heat is evident upon the appearance of Mediterranean vegetation in the region. The temperatures are moderate between Lyon and Montélimar. Valence's average temperature in January is 3.8 °C and 22 °C in July. The mistral here blows harder.

From Montélimar, the climate can be considered to be that of a Mediterranean climate. Near the highway, the change of vegetation is particularly visible near the stream at Donzère, particularly due to the change of the soil profile. The most southern part of the department clearly exhibits a Méso-Mediterranean climate with the reinforcement of the mistral and a hotter summer due to the rarity of storms. Most rainfall occurs in autumn and the winters are milder than the rest of the Drôme. Pierrelatte has an average temperature of 5 °C in January and 23 °C in July.

== Demographics ==
The inhabitants of the department are called Drômois in French.

Historical population

Year	Pop.	±% p.a.
1791	246,687	—
1801	235,357	−0.47%
1806	253,502	+1.50%
1821	273,511	+0.51%
1831	299,556	+0.91%
1841	311,551	+0.39%
1851	326,846	+0.48%
1861	326,684	−0.00%
1872	320,417	−0.18%
1881	313,763	−0.23%
1891	306,419	−0.24%
1901	297,321	−0.30%
1911	290,894	−0.22%
1921	263,509	−0.98%

Year	Pop.	±% p.a.
1931	267,080	+0.13%
1936	267,281	+0.02%
1946	268,233	+0.04%
1954	275,280	+0.32%
1962	304,227	+1.26%
1968	342,891	+2.01%
1975	361,847	+0.77%
1982	389,781	+1.07%
1990	414,072	+0.76%
1999	437,778	+0.62%
2007	473,428	+0.98%
2012	491,334	+0.75%
2017	511,553	+0.81%
2023	524,207	+0.41%

=== Principal towns ===
The most populous commune, home to about 1/8 of the department's population, is Valence, the prefecture. As of 2023, there are six communes with more than 10,000 inhabitants:

Commune	Population (2023)
Valence	64,458
Montélimar	40,595
Romans-sur-Isère	33,464
Bourg-lès-Valence	19,992
Pierrelatte	13,756
Portes-lès-Valence	10,477

== Economy ==
Most of the economic activity of the Drôme department is located in the west of the department, along the Rhône valley. This area which contains most of the population of the department, also has accessible transportation, such as the A7 autoroute and the rail routes LGV Rhône-Alpes and LGV Méditerranée. Economic activity in Valence was boosted by the creation of the Valence TGV line in 2001.

=== Statistics ===
- Total employment (2004): 158,930 (about 10.6% is self-employed)
- Unemployment rate (2006): 9.9%
- Jobs per sector of activity (2005)
  - Agriculture: 6.0%
  - Industry: 20.4%
  - BTP: 6.8%
  - Commerce: 15.0%
  - Services: 51.8%
- Qualification of Jobs (1999)
  - Farmers: 4.0%
  - CEO: 7.8%
  - Executives: 9.6%
  - Technicians and associate professionals: 23.0%
  - Employees: 27.2%
  - Labourers: 28.5%
- Average annual salary (2004)
  - CEO: €53,113
  - Executives: €39,265
  - Technicians and associate professionals: €22,927
  - Employees: €15,688
  - Labourers: €16,344
  - Apprentices and labourers : €7,498

=== Tourism ===
- The Drôme benefits from an excellent image in the view of tourists. Attendance has grown steadily (+4% between 2006 and 2007), faster than the neighbouring departments of Ardèche and the Vaucluse (+1%).
- Number of overnight stays in 2022: 12.8 million
- The Tourism Committee of the Drôme department's website La Drôme, du Vercors à la Provence received over 44000 visits in 2007, along with a new TV station Drome.tv

=== Main companies ===
Main companies in 2002
Rank	Company	Revenue	Headquarters	Activity
1	Imaje	231 Million Euros	Bourg-lès-Valence	Industrial plant
2	Alain Manoukian	157 Million Euros	Tain-l'Hermitage	Moving company
3	Lafuma	154 Million Euros	Anneyron	Hiking equipment
4	Crouzet Automations	122 Million Euros	Valence	Automation systems
5	Spit	121 Million Euros	Bourg-lès-Valence	Metallic fixation systems

== Politics ==
The president of the Departmental Council is Marie-Pierre Mouton, elected in May 2017.

Party		seats
•	Socialist Party	9
	Les Republicains	10
	Union of Democrats and Independents	8
•	Miscellaneous Left	6
	Miscellaneous Right	4
	MoDem	0
•	The Greens	0
•	Left Radical Party	1
•	French Communist Party	0

=== Current National Assembly Representatives ===
Constituency	Member	Party
Drôme's 1st constituency	Paul Christophle	Socialist Party
Drôme's 2nd constituency	Lisette Pollet	RN
Drôme's 3rd constituency	Marie Pochon	The Ecologists
Drôme's 4th constituency	Thibaut Monnier	National Rally

== Tourism ==
Sport activities in Drôme include:

- in winter: skiing, cross-country skiing, snow-shoeing
- in summer: excursions, mountain biking in the mountainous area

The Drôme River is also a great place to practice canoëing and kayaking. In the spring the water flow allows for rafting. The Saoü Forest is known for its climbing paths.

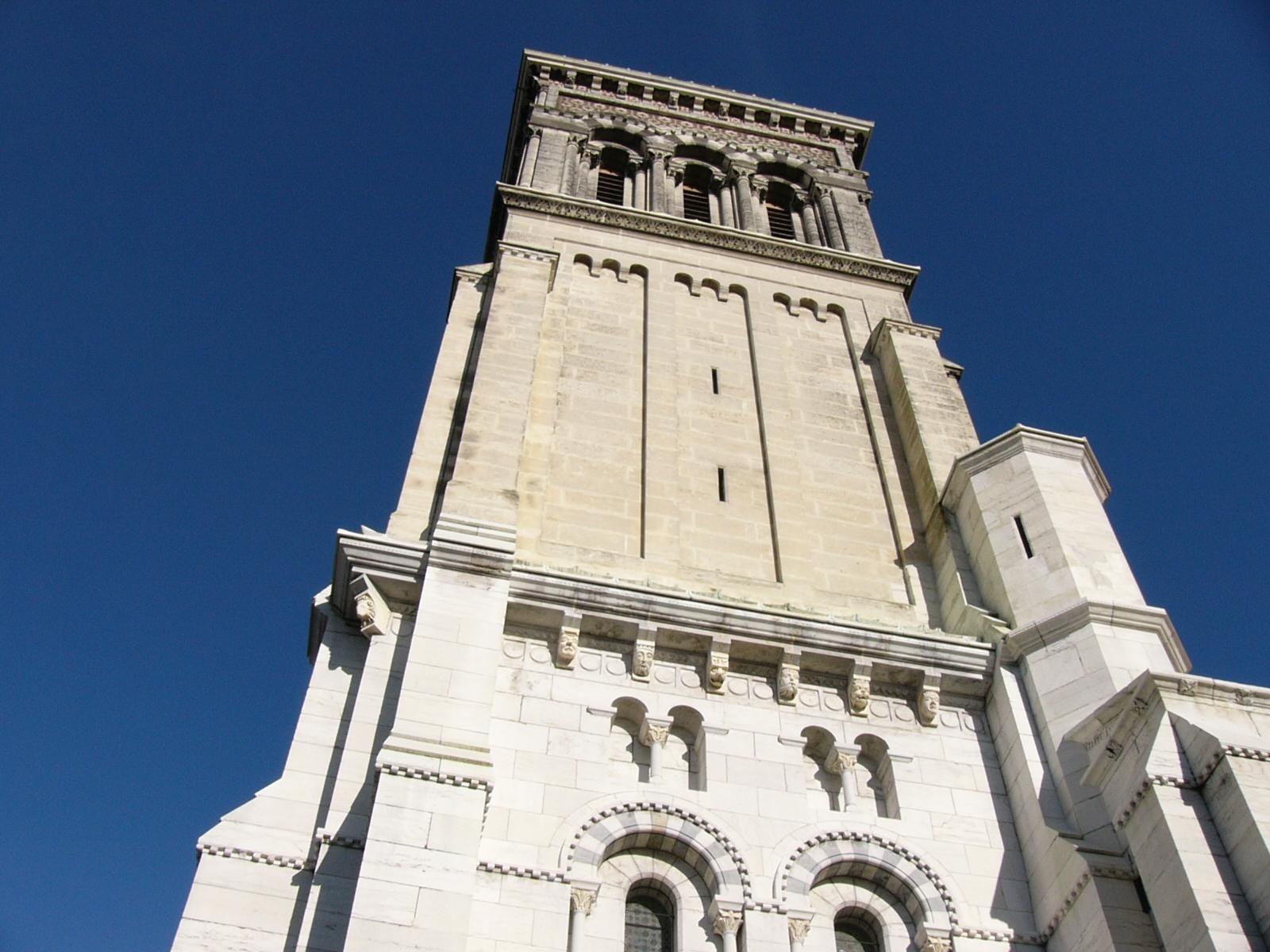
Valence Cathedral

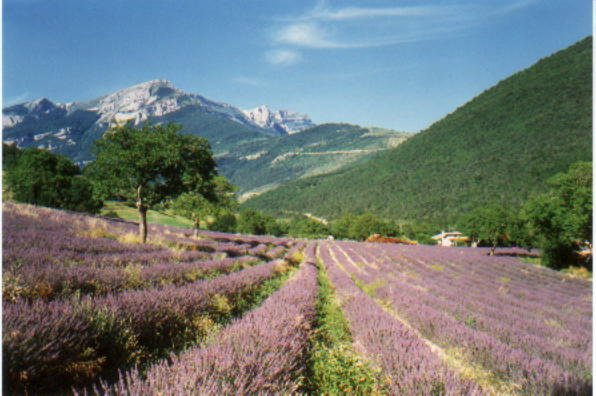
Lavender fields near Die

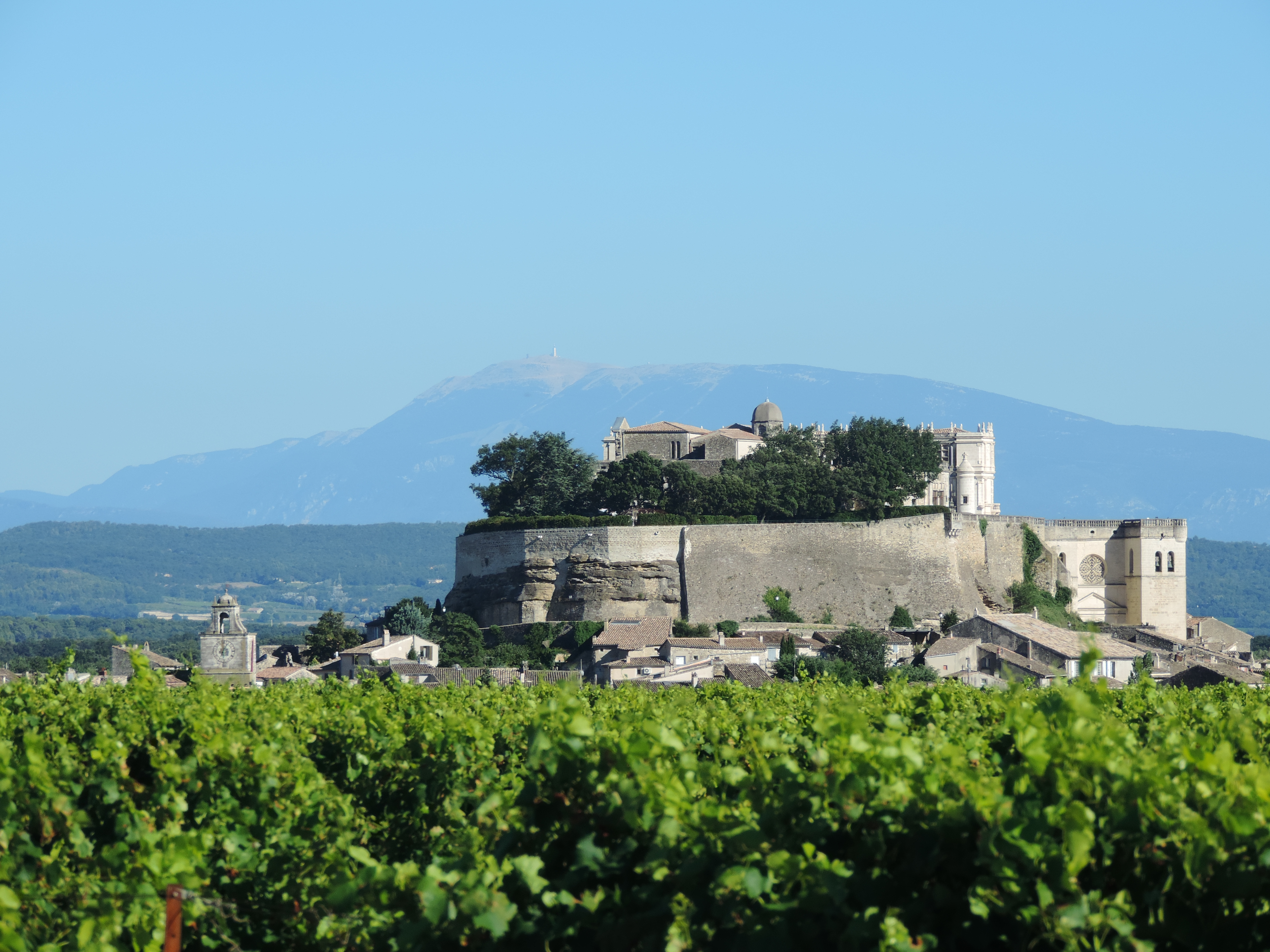
Grignan town and castle

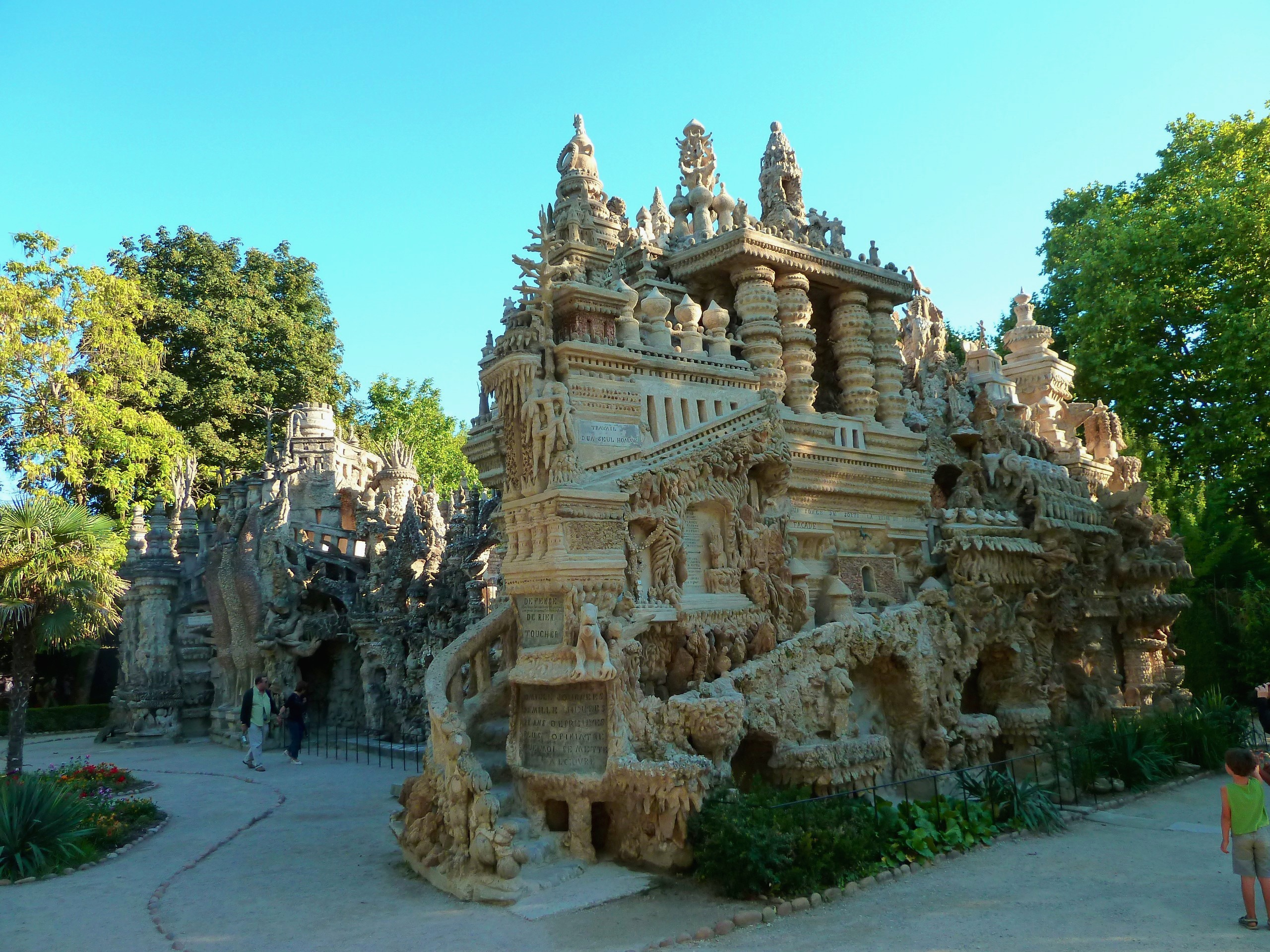
Ferdinand Cheval's palace

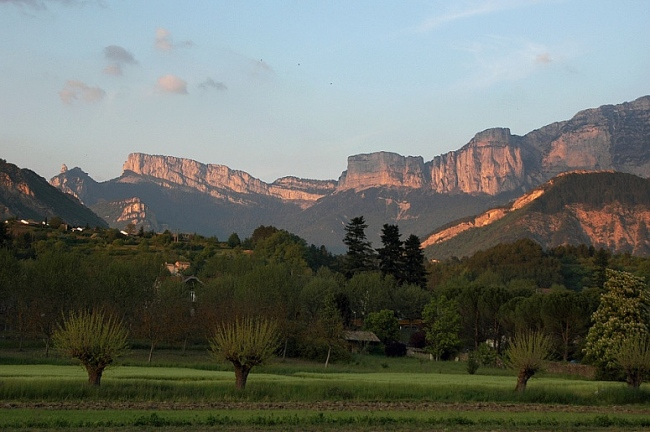
Vercors Plateau

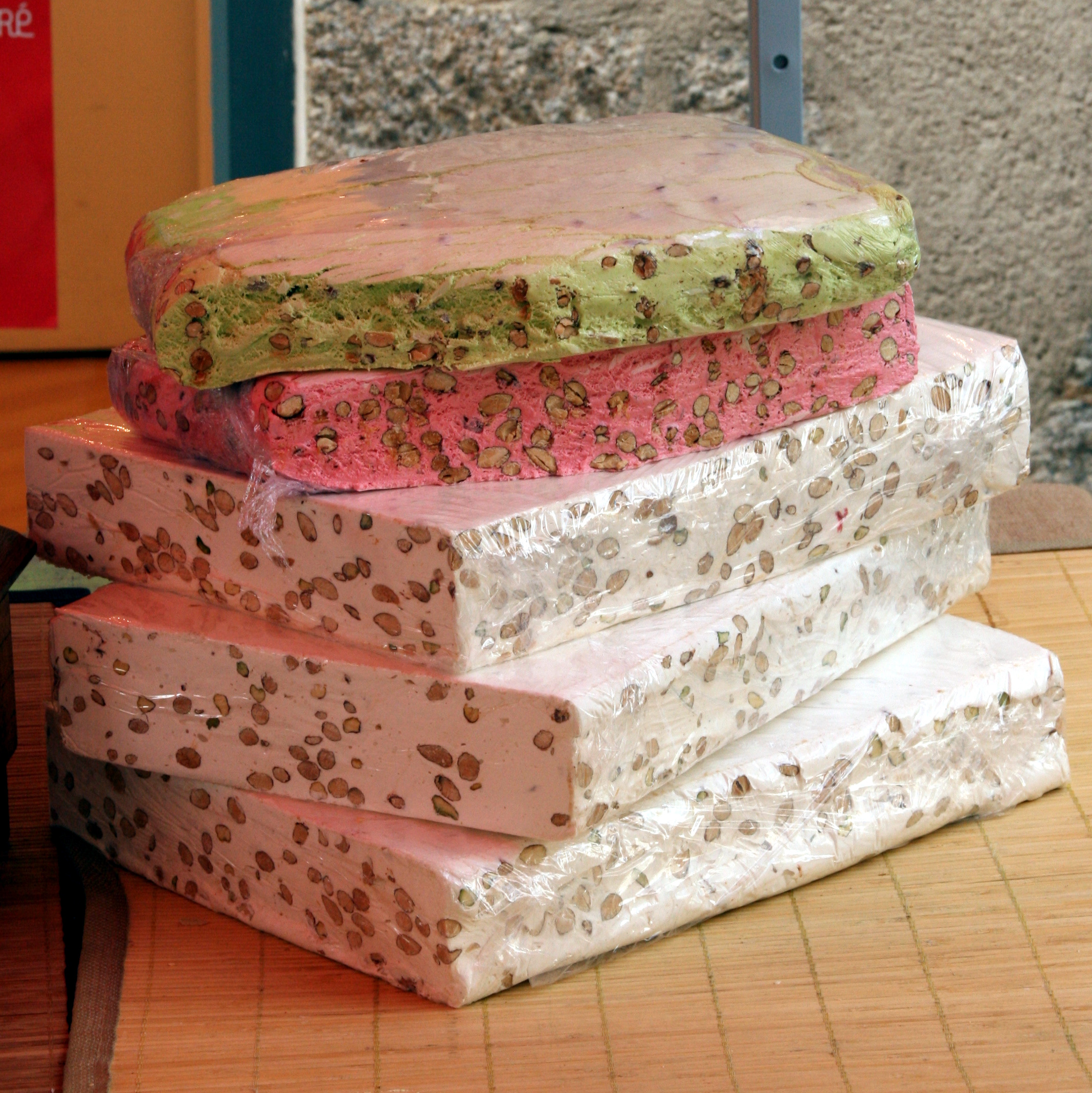
Nougat from Montélimar

== See also ==
- Cantons of the Drôme department
- Communes of the Drôme department
- Arrondissements of the Drôme department
- Marie Louis Descorches
- Albert Severin Roche, WW1 Legion of Honour recipient.
