= Jewish Museum of Turkey =

Museum in Istanbul, Turkey

- Location of the museum in Istanbul
- Former name: Zülfaris Synagogue
- Established: 25 November 2001
- Location: Karaköy, Istanbul, Turkey
- Coordinates: 41°01′36″N 28°58′22″E
- Type: Jewish museum
- Director: Nisya İşman Allovi
- Curator: Naim Güleryüz
- Website: muze500.com

The Jewish Museum of Turkey (officially Quincentennial Foundation Museum of Turkish Jews; Turkish: 500. Yıl Vakfı Türk Musevileri Müzesi) is a Jewish museum and cultural center established by the Quincentennial Foundation to inform the society of the traditions and history of Turkish Jewry. It was inaugurated on November 25, 2001. The Quincentennial Foundation was established in 1989 by 113 Turkish citizens, Jews and Muslims alike, to celebrate the five hundredth anniversary of the arrival of Sephardim to the Ottoman Empire. The idea of a museum was proposed by Naim Güleryüz who is now its curator and the foundation was financed by the prominent Jewish Kamhi family.

== The building ==
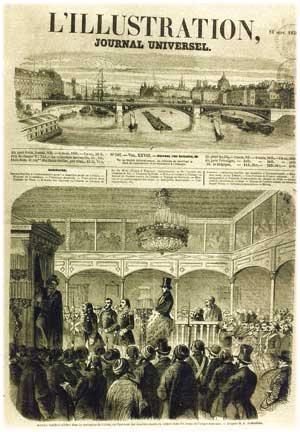
In September 1856 a ceremony was held at the Zülfaris Synagogue commemorating Jewish soldiers in the French army who fought and fell alongside the Ottomans against the Russians during the Crimean war. A military unit under the command of Staff Colonel Garbi Bey was present at this ceremony.

The museum building, formerly known as Zülfaris Synagogue, was restored and remodelled to suit a museum. There is evidence that a synagogue existed in 1671, and its foundations suggest that another structure was built during the colony of the Republic of Genoa. It was recorded as "Holy Sinavi (Synagogue) in Galata" or "Kal Kadoş Galata", it was called as "Zülfaris" which is thought to have derived from the Persian word "Zülf-ü Arus", meaning "the fringe of a bride". However the actual building was re-erected over its original foundations presumably in the early 19th century, probably in 1823.

=== Time line ===
- 1882 – The marble frame surrounding the Ehal (Ark) was donated by Samuel Malki.
- 1890 – Repair work was carried out with the financial assistance of the Camondo Family.
- 1904 – Restoration work was conducted by the Jewish Community of Galata presided over by Jak Bey de Leon.
- 1968 – Went through substantial repair.
- 1979 – Assigned for worship for the Jews of Thracian origin.
- 1983 – Last wedding in Zülfaris.
- 1985 – Ceased to serve as synagogue due to lack of a congregation, and allocated to the Quincentennial Foundation by the Neve Shalom Foundation.
- 2001 – With the financial backing of the Kamhi Family and the contributions of Jak Kamhi, it was inaugurated as a museum.

== Museum design ==
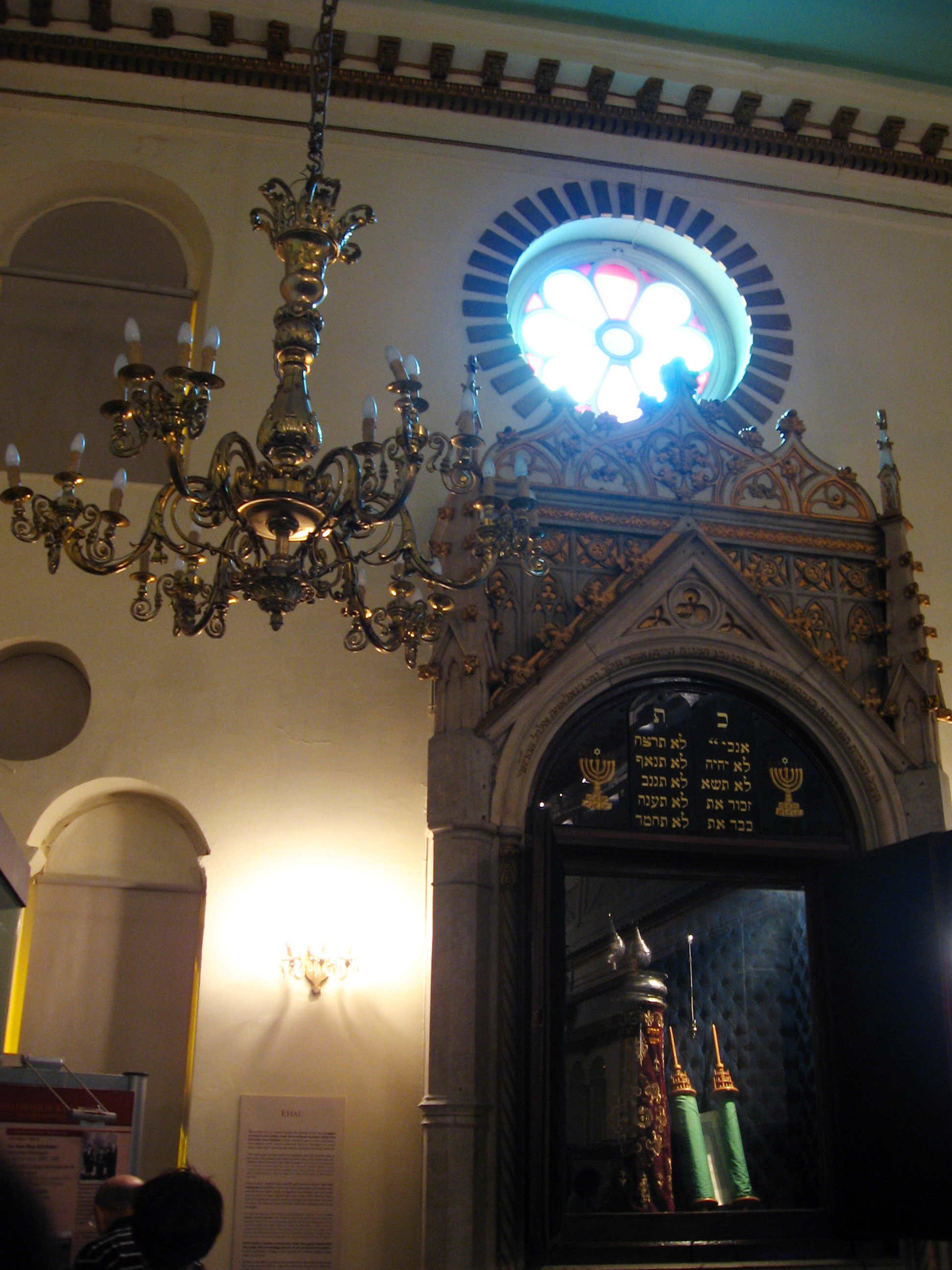
The ehal of the Zülfaris synagogue

Jewish Museum of Turkey includes sections on the intermingling cultures of Jewish and Muslim Turks and ethnographic articles that depict the traditions of Turkish Jews, as well as the historical accounts of the Jewish odyssey from Spain to Turkey.

Entrance to the building is through an iron gate into a courtyard, in which a metal sculpture by Nadia Arditti is located. Titled the "Statue of the Rising Fire", it is in memory of the Turkish Jews who died fighting in the Balkan, Dalmatia, Caucasus, Palestine, Tripolitania, Dardannelles, Korea and Liberation wars.

The octagonal main hall on the entrance floor information panels related to the history of the Zülfaris Synagogue, the Hahambaşı institution, daily life of Jews living in Istanbul and Anatolia, as well as artifacts such as letters, maps, tallits, fermans (imperial decrees) are on display. A copy of the Lausanne Treaty that recognized the sovereignty of the Republic of Turkey and with which Turkish Jews relinquished their minority privileges. The ehal (ark) on the same floor holds two torah scrolls which can be viewed. On another information panel, Jewish academicians who fled to Turkey from Europe during the Second World War and Turkish diplomats who helped Jews escape the Holocaust, some of which are Righteous Among the Nations are introduced.

The balcony, which used to be the prayer section for women holds some paintings depicting daily lives of the local Jewish community. The lower, ground floor is organized chronologically as an ethnographic section with photographs, paintings and objects pertaining to birth, circumcision, wedding, clothing, jewelry, etc.

== Gallery ==
Jewish Museum of Turkey interior

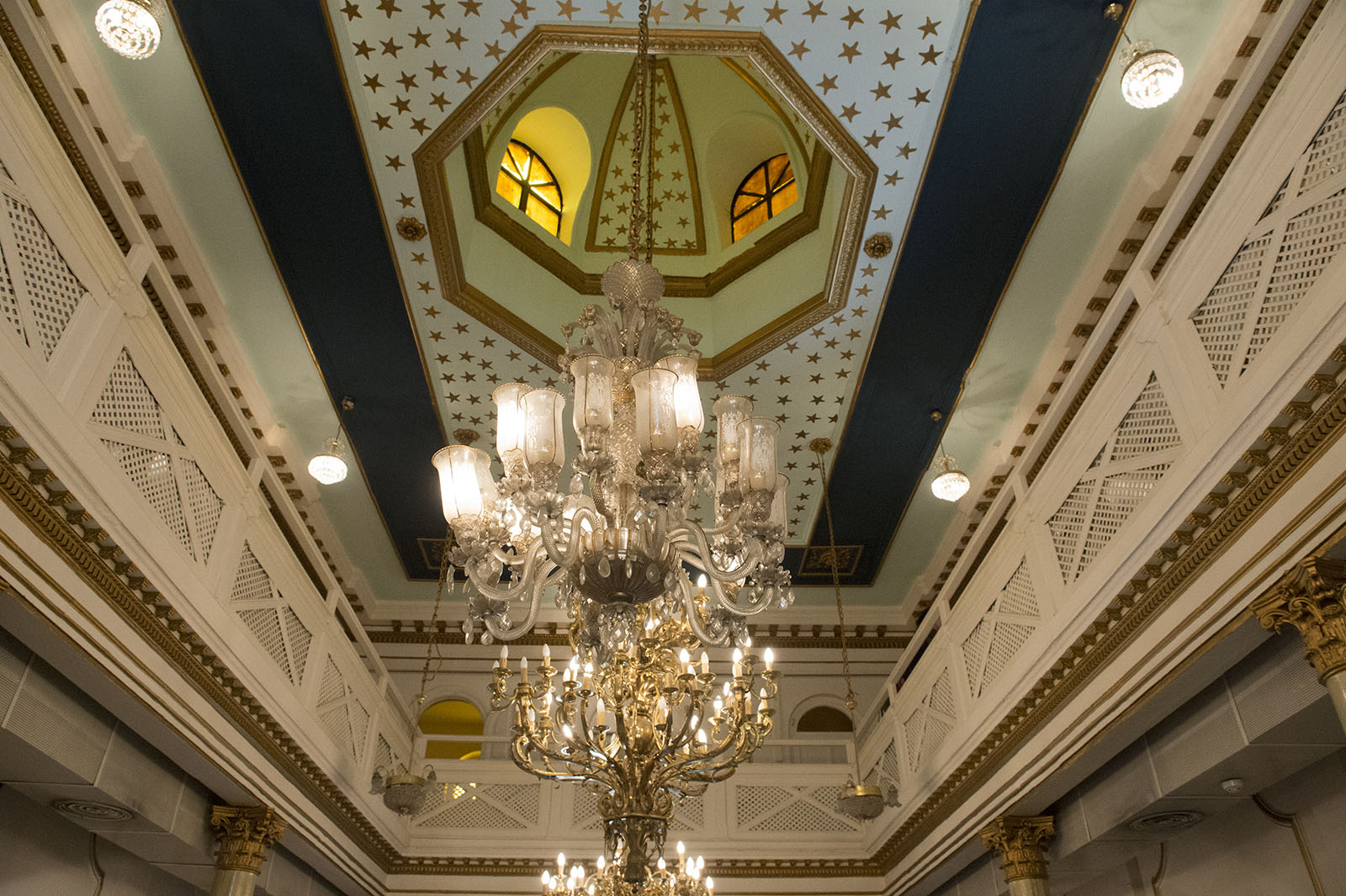
Jewish Museum of Turkey interior

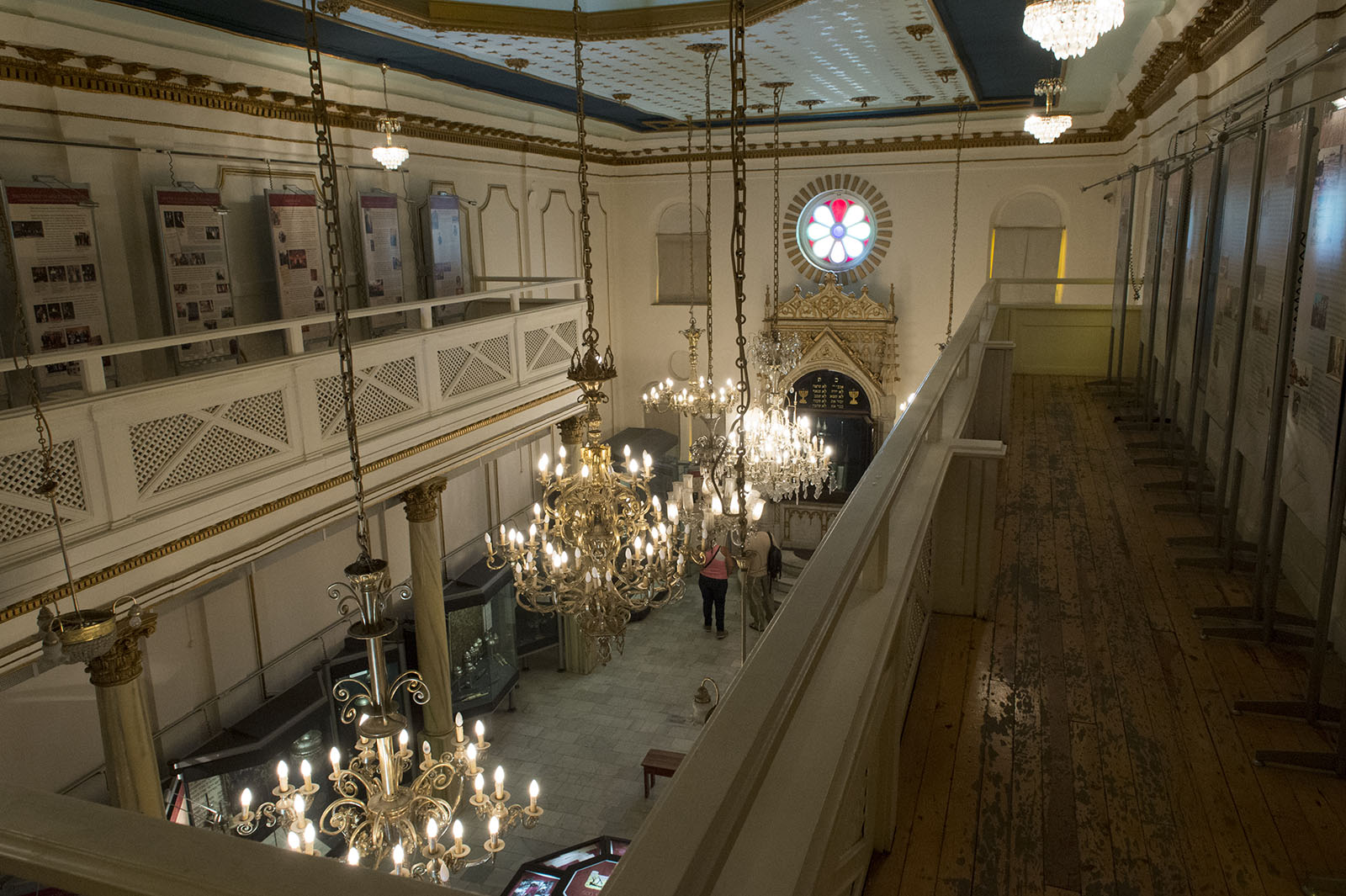
Jewish Museum of Turkey interior

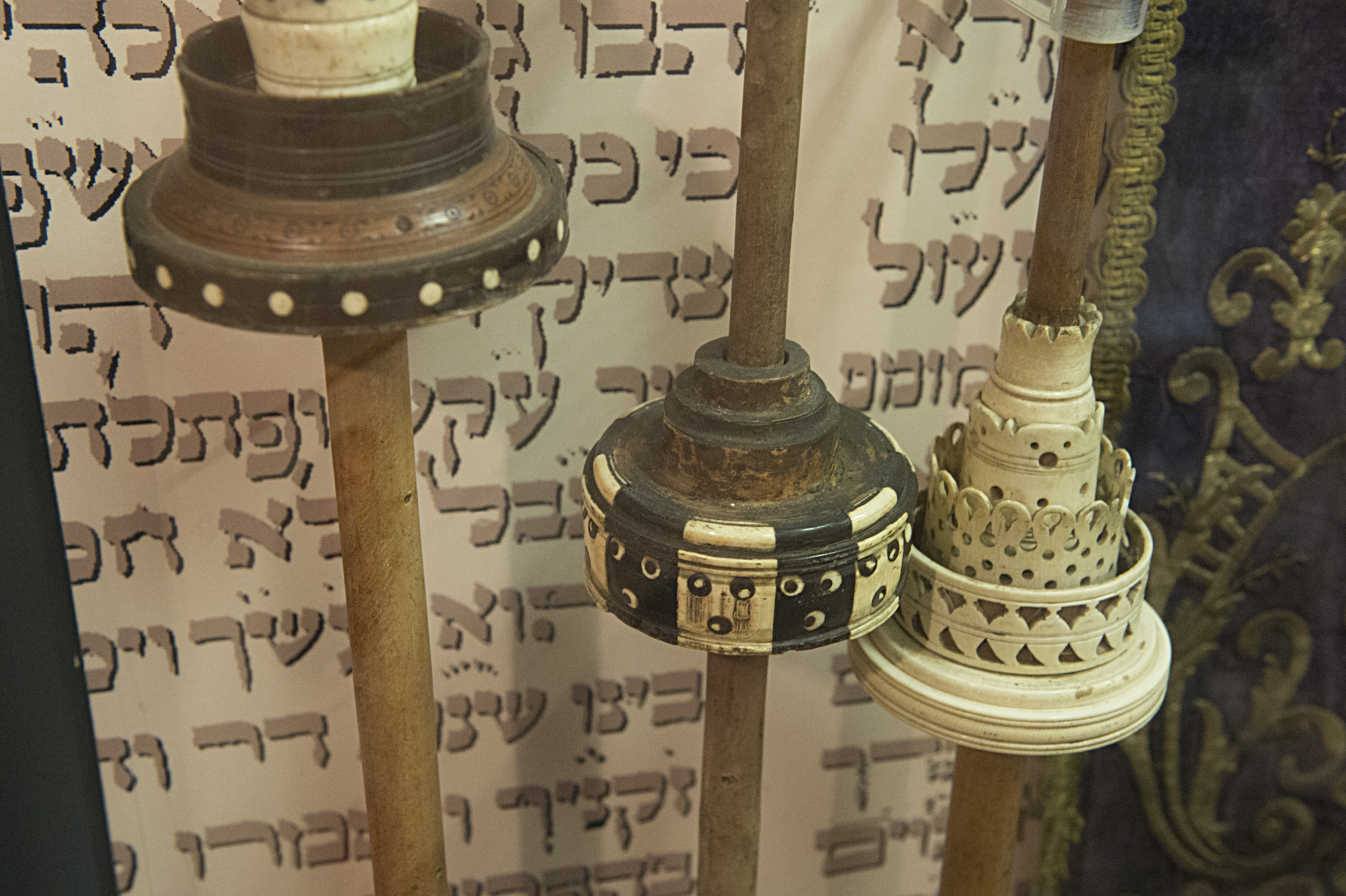
Jewish Museum of Turkey objects

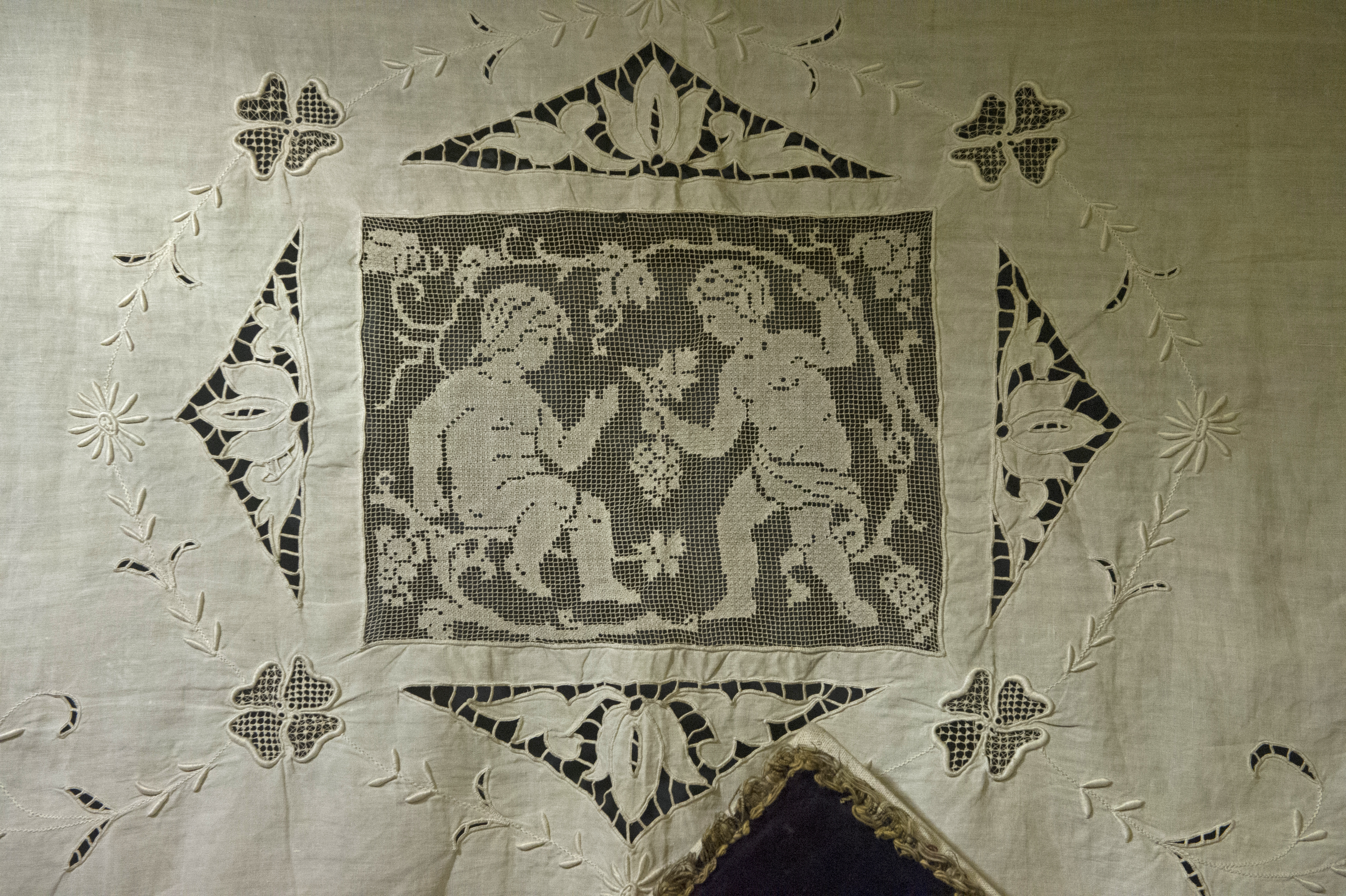
Jewish Museum of Turkey objects

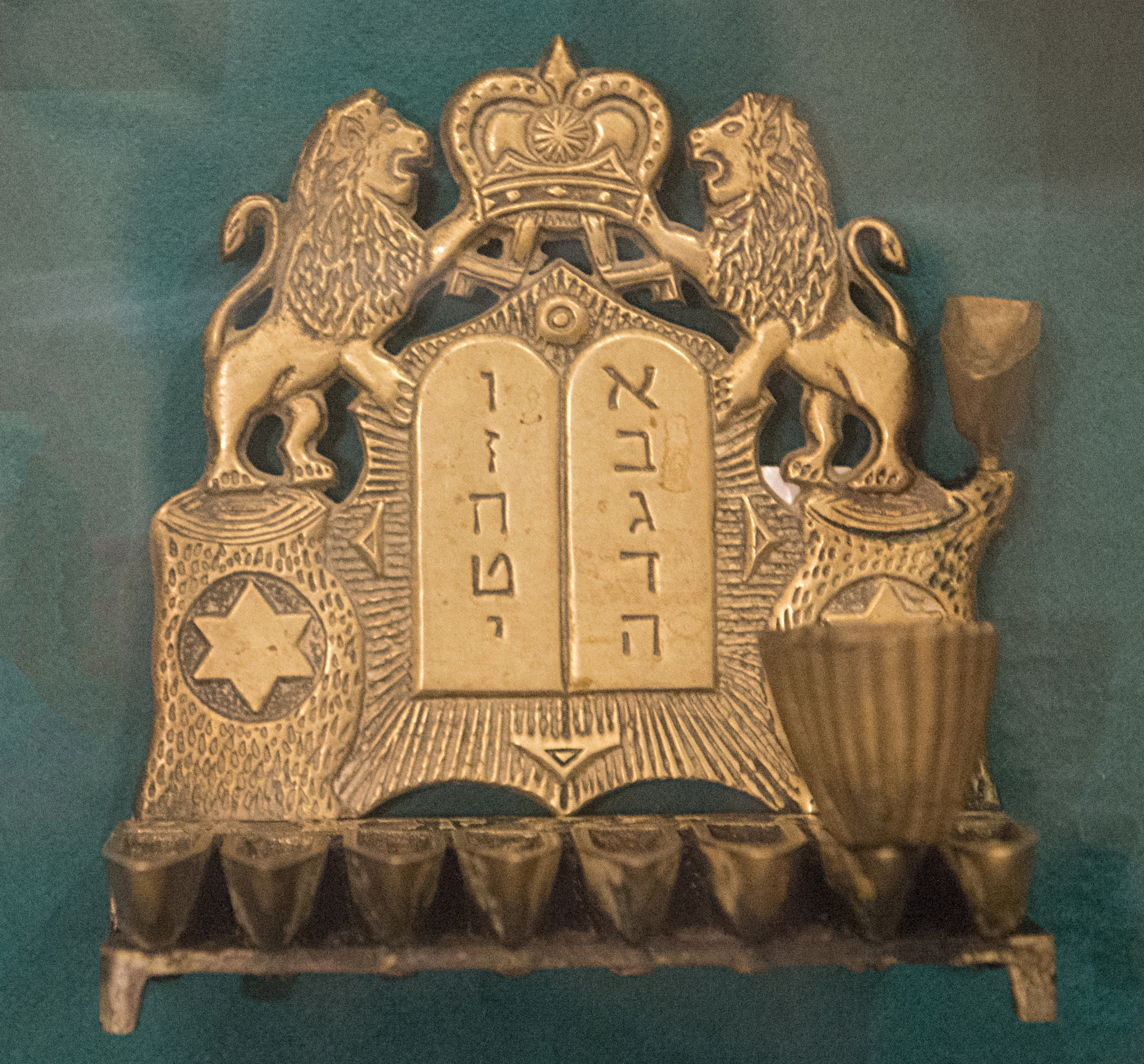
Jewish Museum of Turkey objects

Jewish Museum of Turkey objects

Jewish Museum of Turkey objects

Jewish Museum of Turkey objects

Jewish Museum of Turkey objects

Jewish Museum of Turkey objects

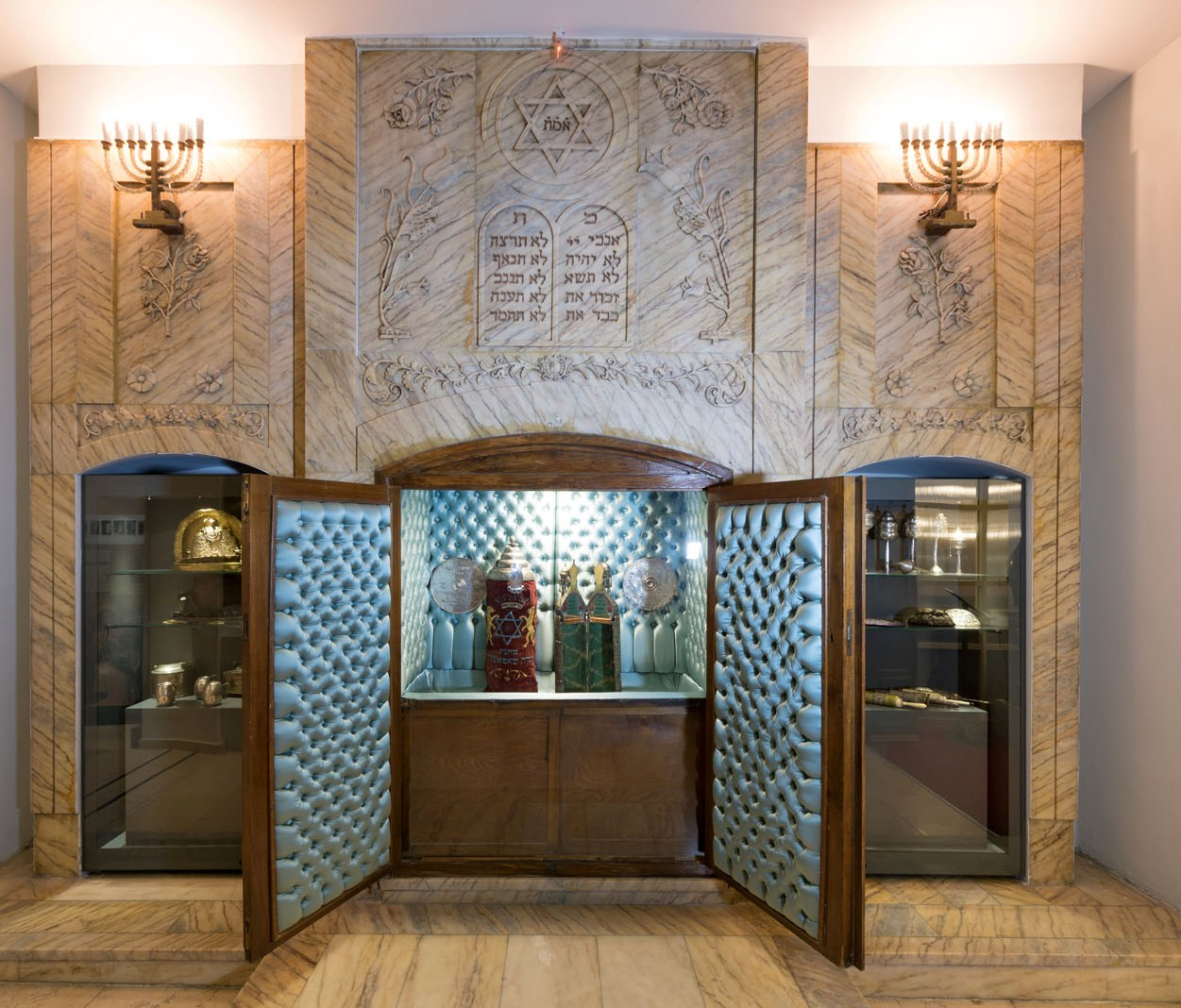
Jewish Museum of Turkey objects

== See also ==
- History of the Jews in Turkey
- List of museums and monuments in Istanbul
- Museums in Turkey
