= Simon Attias Synagogue =

Former synagogue in Essaouira, Morocco

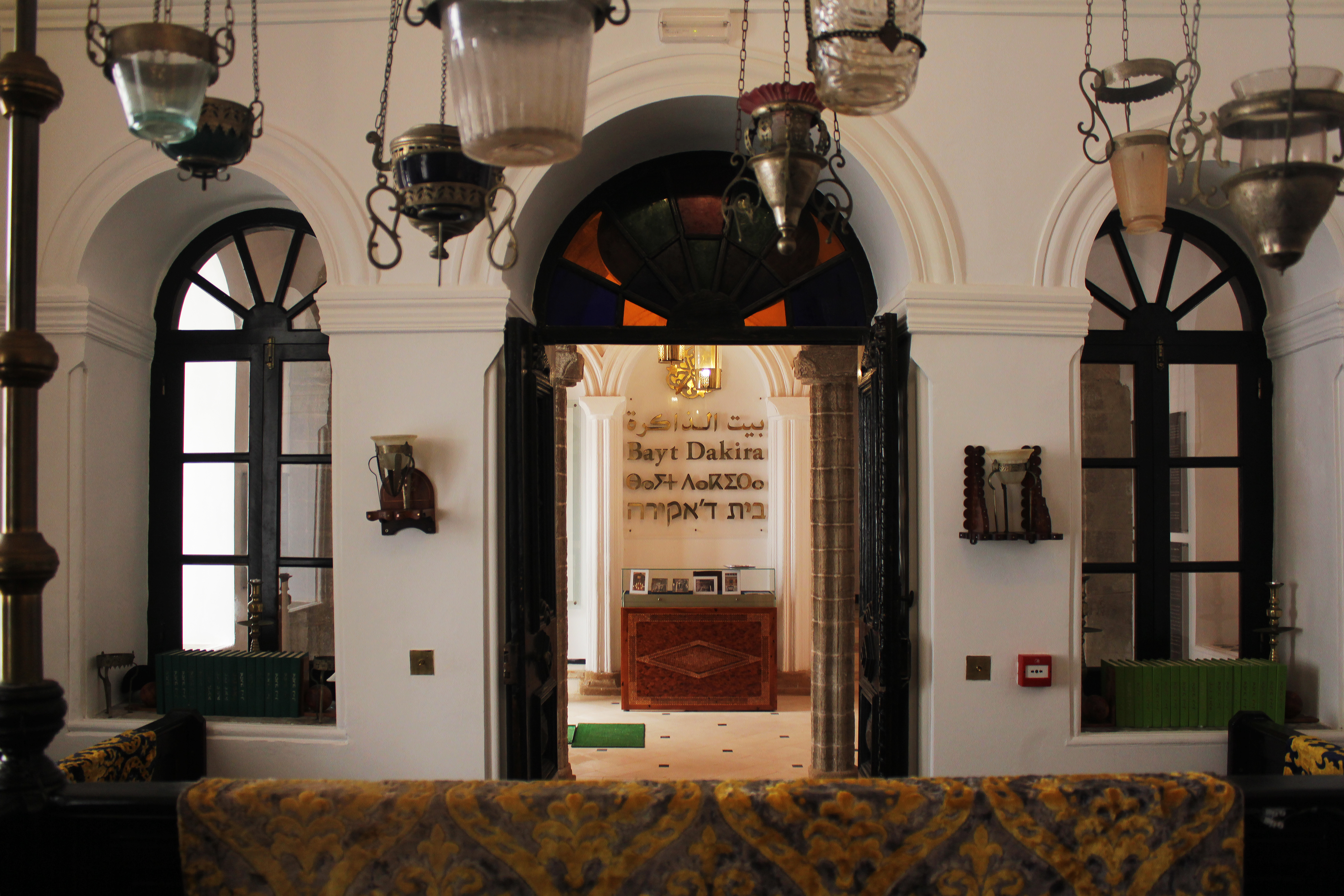
- The former synagogue in Bayt Dakira, in 2020

- Location of the former synagogue in Morocco

Religion
- Affiliation: Judaism (former)
- Ecclesiastical or organizational status: Synagogue; Jewish museum
- Status: Closed (as a synagogue); Repurposed

Location
- Location: Bayt Dakira, Essaouira, Marrakesh-Safi
- Country: Morocco
- Interactive map of Simon Attias Synagogue
- Coordinates: 31°30′48″N 9°46′15″W

Architecture
- Type: Synagogue architecture
- Completed: 1882

The Simon Attias Synagogue is a former Jewish synagogue, located in Essaouira, formerly known as Mogador, in Marrakesh-Safi, Morocco. It is also known as the Bet Ha-Knesset Simon Attias, M'sod Attias and Shaarei T'filah (bet kenesset, 'house of assembly' or Hebrew: בית תפילה, romanized: bet tefila, lit. 'House of Prayer'). The synagogue was built in 1882. The former synagogue has been incorporated as part of Bayt Dakira, a Jewish museum.

== History ==
The synagogue forms one wing of a masonry, courtyard building that also contained the home of Simon Attias. A single, large door set into a Horseshoe arch leads into the suite of buildings. The synagogue is on the second floor. The ground floor once held shops. The third floor contained the offices of Jewish courts, which heard both commercial and personal cases. The synagogue proper is a space two stories high, with large, rounded-arch windows and a women's gallery.

The interior woodword was carved in London. The large, wooden Torah Ark featured columns and a rounded pediment, and is decorated with floral carvings. A large number of memorial lamps survived in 1993, including one to the memory of Simon Attias, who died in 1892. In 1993 the synagogue was in sound condition. In 2009 it is closed and is now undergoing restoration and conversion to a museum.

After the restoration, the former synagogue formed part of the Bayt Dakira Jewish museum.

== See also ==
- History of the Jews in Morocco
- List of synagogues in Morocco
