= Beth El Synagogue (São Paulo) =

Synagogue in São Paulo

- Portuguese: Sinagoga Beth-El
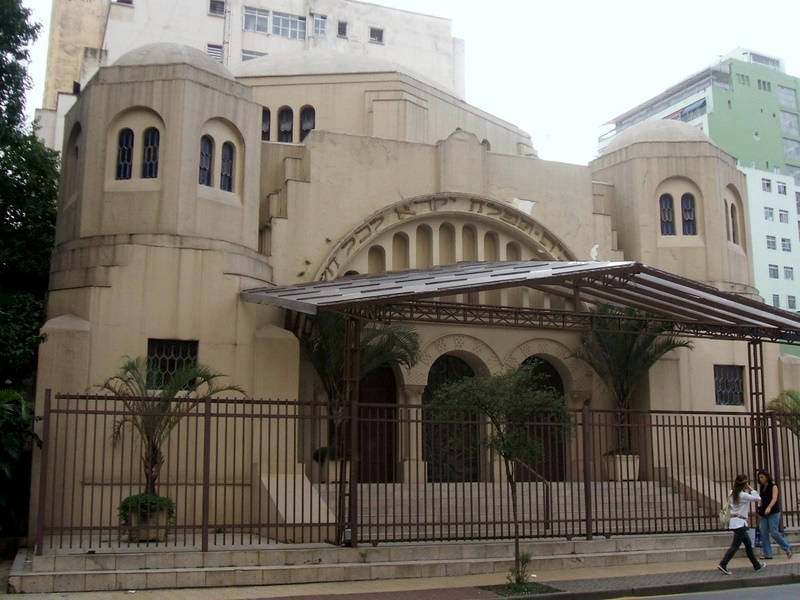
- The synagogue in 2009, prior to its restoration

- Location of the synagogue in São Paulo

Religion
- Affiliation: Reform Judaism
- Rite: Nusach Ashkenaz
- Ecclesiastical or organizational status: Synagogue (since 1926); Jewish museum (since 2021)
- Year consecrated: 1929
- Status: Active

Location
- Location: 105 - 1º Rua Avanhandava, Bela Vista, São Paulo
- Country: Brazil
- Interactive map of Beth El Synagogue
- Coordinates: 23°33′03″S 46°38′44″W

Architecture
- Architect: Samuel Roder
- Type: Synagogue architecture
- Style: Byzantine Revival
- Funded by: Salomão Klabin
- Established: 1926 (as a congregation)
- Completed: 1929
- Dome: Three (maybe more)

Website
- templobethel.org.br (in Portuguese)

The Beth-El Synagogue (Portuguese: Sinagoga Beth-El; officially Portuguese: Congregação Israelita de São Paulo Templo Beth El) is a Reform Jewish congregation, synagogue, and Jewish museum, located on Rua Avanhandava, Bela Vista, in the city of São Paulo, Brazil. Built in 1929, the synagogue has the distinction of being the first synagogue building in São Paulo. Consecrated in December 1929, construction of the temple was financed by a number of Jewish families in São Paulo and organized by Salomão Klabin. The synagogue's architecture is notable as the building has seven sides.

The synagogue hosts religious services, while the building houses the Jewish Museum of São Paulo, which is dedicated to promoting local Jewish culture and history. While the building was consecrated in 1929, religious services were first held in the building in 1932. The museum opened in 2021.

Beth-El Synagogue affiliates with an inclusive and pluralist form of Judaism and welcomes people from different backgrounds; and is a member of the World Union for Progressive Judaism. The foundation of the synagogue in 1926 represents the historical roots of the community.

== History ==
The synagogue building, completed in the Byzantine Revival style, was designed by Russian architect, Samuel Roder, at the request of local Jewish immigrant families. The synagogue was located in the neighborhood of Bom Retiro, where most of the community lived at the time. The building has seven sides, meant to symbolize both the seven days of creation and the branches of the menorah of the ancient Temple. The synagogue plays an important symbolic role in different life cycle events for the Jewish community of São Paulo, including britot milah, bar and bat mitzvah and weddings. In the 1960s, Beth El was also a local partner with the Israelite Federation of São Paulo State, in order to receive immigrants and provide job training.

Sculptor Gerson Knispel, briefly used the basement of Beth El as his studio.

=== Jewish Museum of São Paulo ===
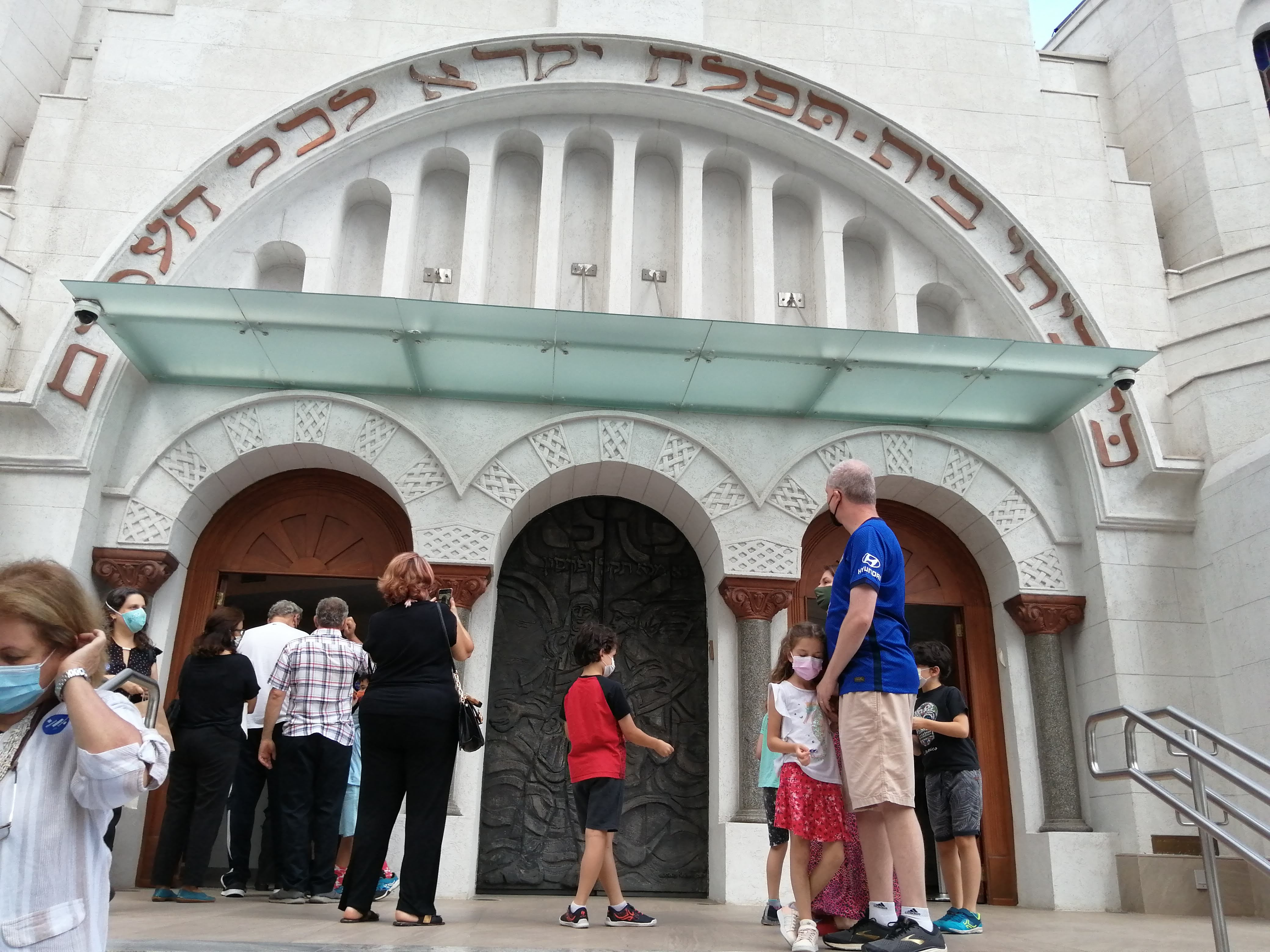
The synagogue and museum entrance in 2021, following its restoration

The Friends of the Jewish Museum of São Paulo Association was founded in April 2000 for the purpose of assisting with plans to move the Jewish Museum of São Paulo to the site of the synagogue. In 2009, architecture firm Botti Rubin was hired to make the necessary adaptations of the building for the best museological use of the space. In May 2011, work began to convert the synagogue space into the Jewish Museum of São Paulo. As of 2017, a large amount of work had been moved to the synagogue building for the museum. While the new location was planned to open in 2013, work was ongoing as of 2019, due to the difficulty around adding new pillars in an area where an underground river had been rerouted. Beth‑El was restored with funds from the Cultural Preservation Programme of the Federal Foreign Office of the Government of Germany. Extensive renovations were completed over the course of 17 years, and the museum opened in 2021.

This museum became the first museum of religion in the State of São Paulo, and had the main goal of preserving local Jewish history. The vision is to disseminate the relationship between the Jewish community and Brazil, including the difficulties faced by the community during the government of Getúlio Vargas.

An urn will be installed in the garden which will contain approximately one thousand different items, including items from World War II and victims of The Holocaust. While property values in downtown São Paulo have decreased, the museum project is estimated to invest 26 million Brazilian real into the community. The museum collection is composed mostly of items with a symbolic, rather than financial value. This includes cutlery engraved with swastikas, war diaries and banknotes from the Concentration camps.

== Location ==
Beth-El Synagogue is located on Rua Avanhandava, número 105 - 1º in the Bela Vista district of São Paulo. Since September 2013, the building has been listed by the Municipal Heritage Preservation Council due to its historical, religious and architectural value to the community.

== Present day ==
The synagogue is only open during the High Holidays (Rosh Hashana and Yom Kippur) or for scheduled visits. The synagogue offers a number of educational programs, including Hebrew classes, Bar and Bat Mitzvah preparation, meditation, marriage classes, and introduction to Judaism classes.

Rabbi Uri Lam became Rabbi for Beth-El in 2019, after years of experience with other liberal Jewish congregations. Born in São Paulo, Lam began as a liturgical and choir singer before moving into the rabbinate, serving as the leader of the Jewish community in Campinas, in the late 1990s.

In May 2016, the synagogue held an event with local NGO Migraflix, Talal al-Tinawi and other Syrian refugees with the aim of increasing social inclusion among refugees in the community. A performance by the band Mazeej, formed by Muslims, Jews and Christians, was one of the highlights of the evening, and a lawyer was on-site to help refugees with their processing documents.

== See also ==
- History of the Jews in Brazil
- List of synagogues in Brazil
