= Jewish Museum Worms =

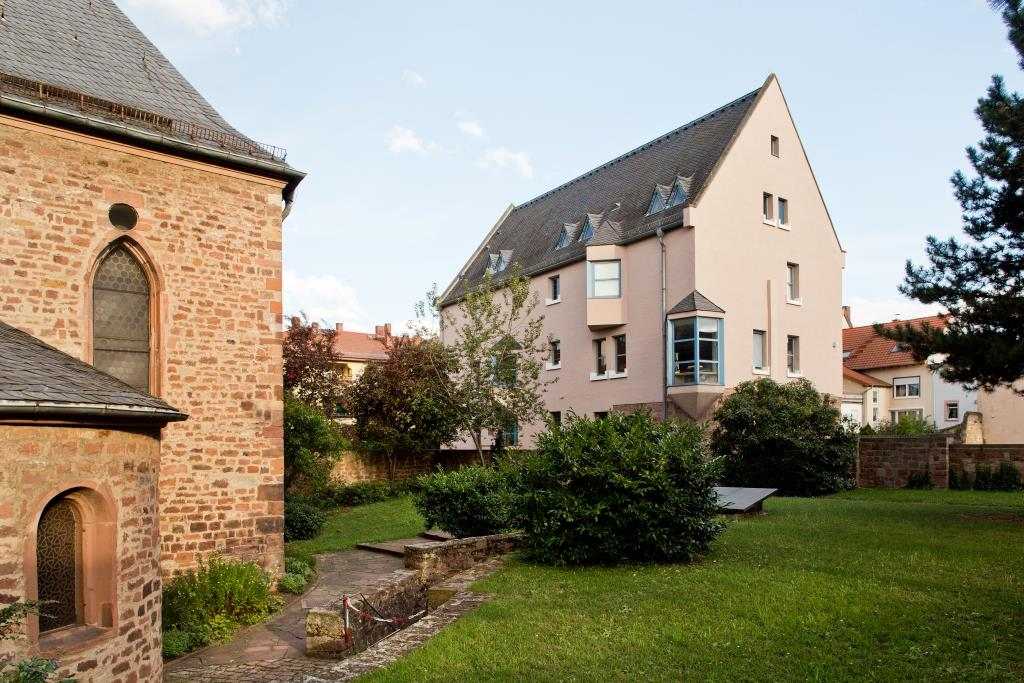
- Rashi House (right), home of the Jewish Museum Worms; on the left, the Worms Synagogue
- Established: 1982
- Location: Worms, Rhineland-Palatinate, Germany
- Coordinates: 49.63337°N 8.36637°E
- Type: Jewish museum
- Visitors: 5,275 (2023)
- Founder: City of Worms
- Director: Gerold Bönnen
- Architect: Rittmannsperger + Kleebank
- Website: https://www.juedischesmuseum-worms.de/juedisches-museum-EN/

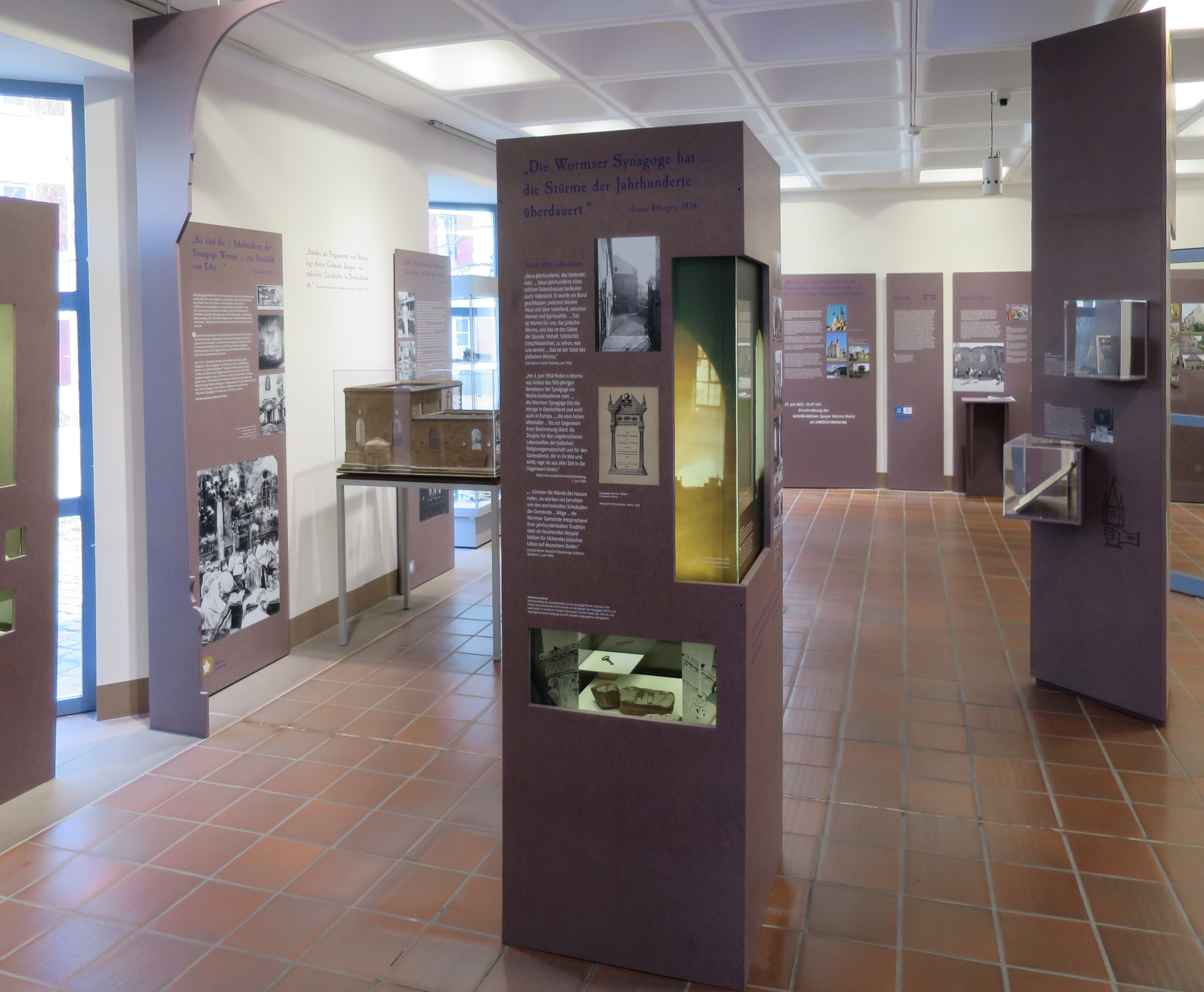
Exhibition on the ground floor

The Jewish Museum Worms is dedicated to the history of the Jews in Worms, Germany and the other SchUM cities. It is operated by the city of Worms.

== History ==
Interest in the history and material heritage of the Jewish community of Worms began to grow in the mid-19th century. Judaica objects were displayed in the so-called Rashi Chapel next to the synagogue shortly after 1900, and scholarly research on community history was published. In 1912, the board of the Jewish community of Worms established a commission to plan a small Jewish museum in the upper floor of the synagogue's entrance building. However, the First World War prevented its realization. Only in 1924 was Isidor Kiefer able to implement the plan. The exhibition initially focused on Judaica and later expanded to include the Rashi Yeshiva, an annex to the synagogue. The Worms Mahzor was also displayed. Kiefer documented the museum's collection before it was mostly destroyed during the November Pogrom in 1938. Kiefer took the documentation with him when he emigrated in 1933, thereby preserving it.

During the 1982 reconstruction of the Rashi House – which primarily housed the Worms City Archive – exhibition spaces were created in the basement and ground floor to present the history of the Jews in Worms. The permanent exhibition displayed models, documents, maps, photographs, and religious artifacts chronicling Jewish life in the city from the High Middle Ages to the community's destruction under National Socialism. Occasional special exhibitions were also hosted.

== Exhibition ==
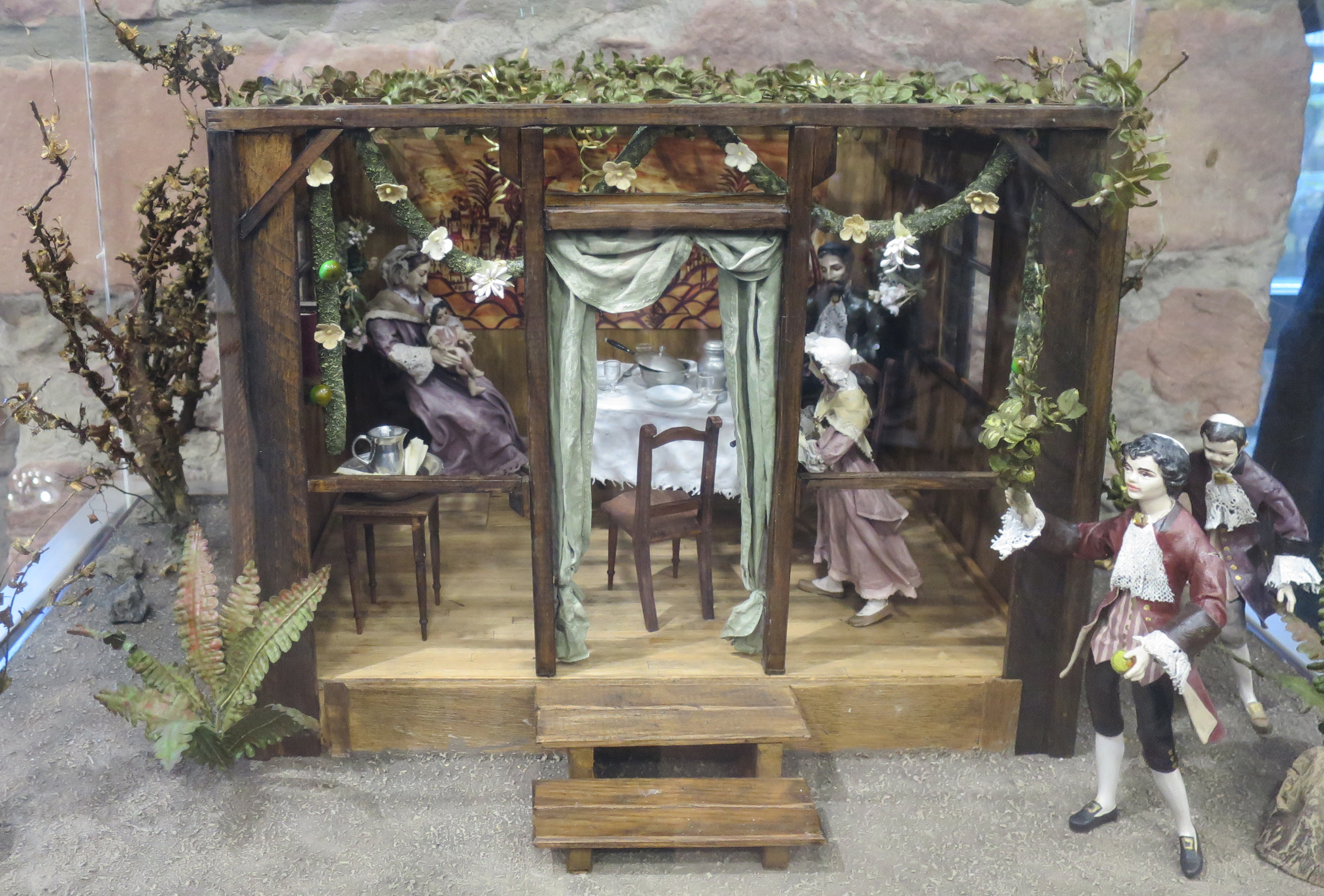
Model of a sukkah for the festival of Sukkot

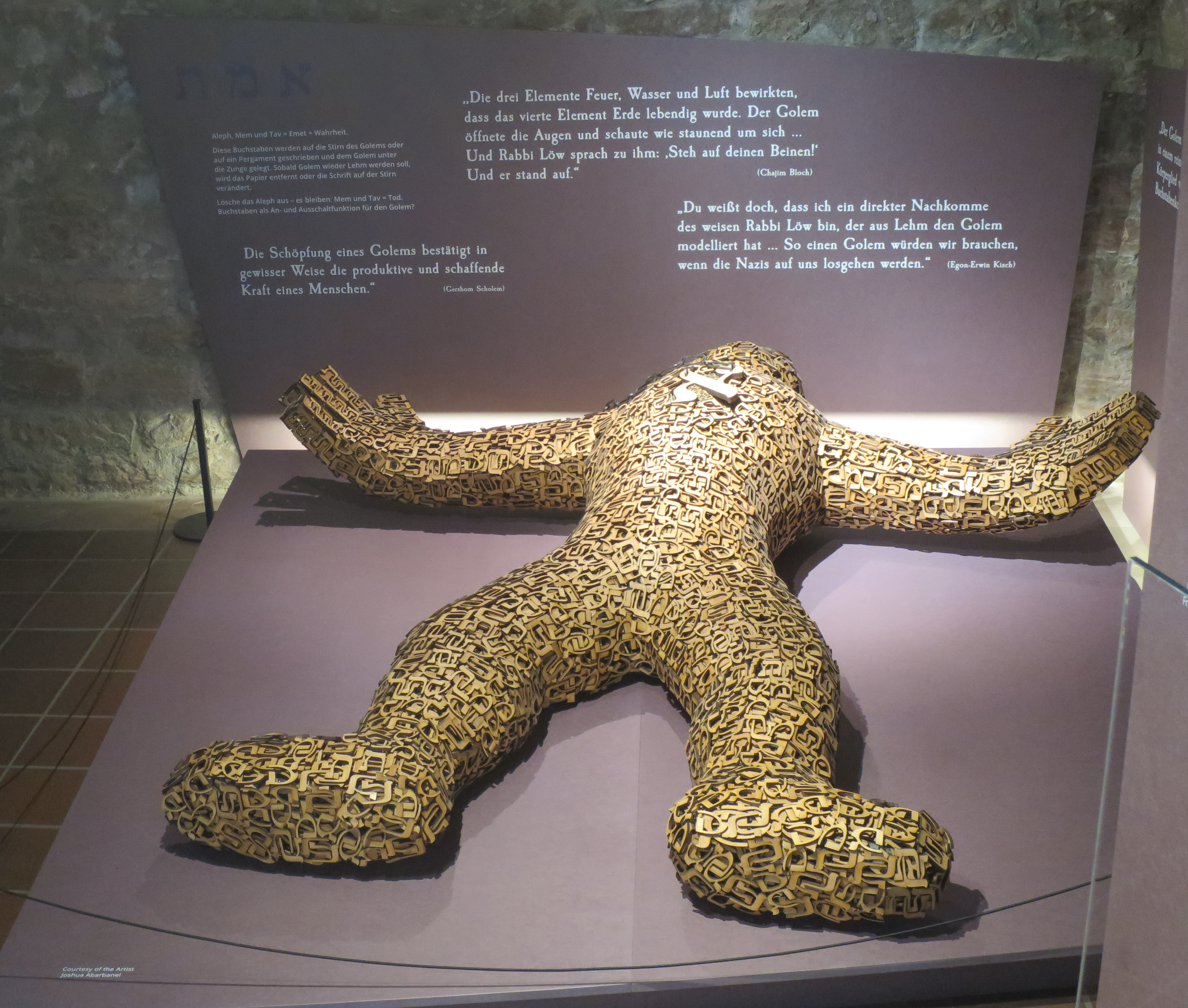
Figure of the Golem

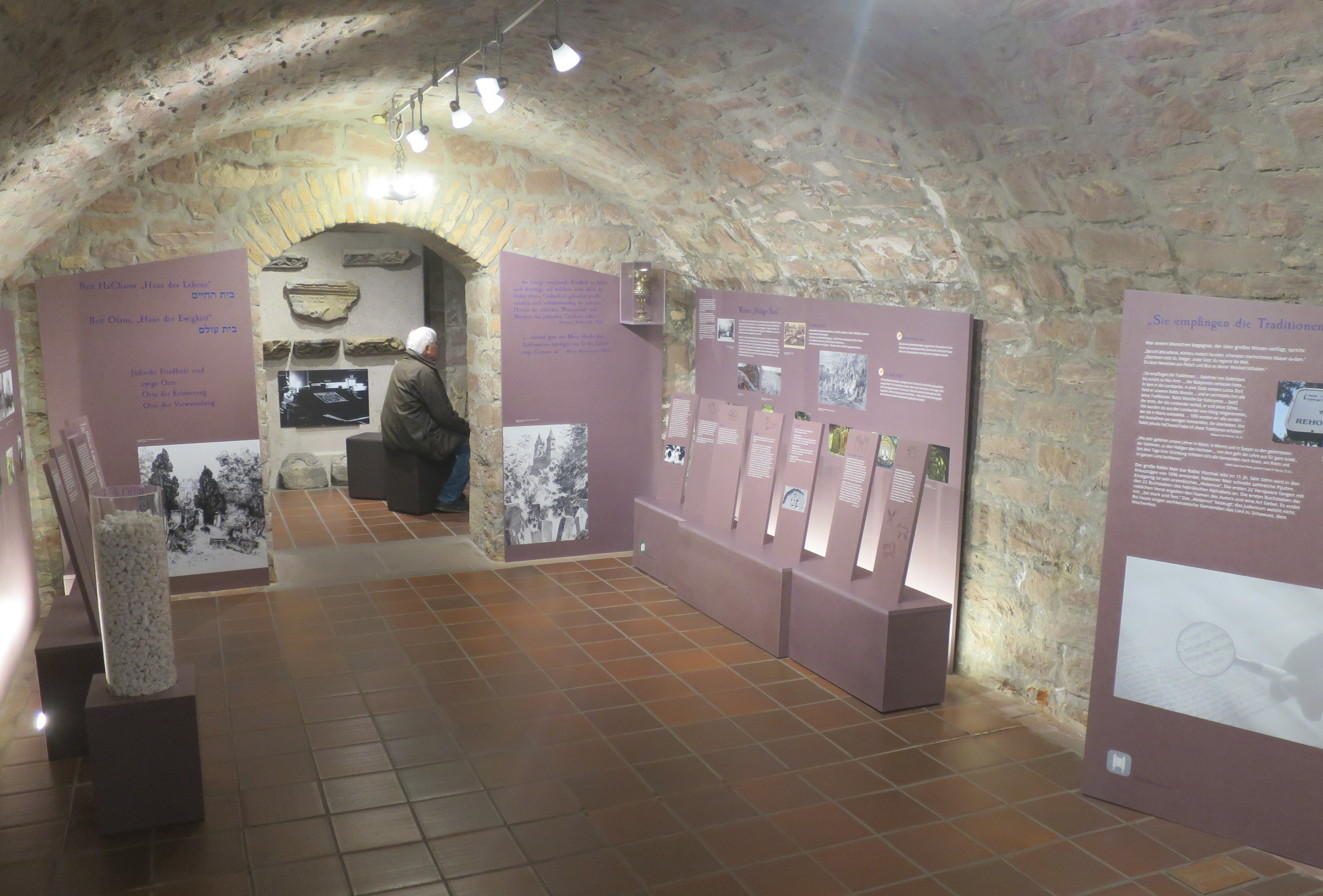
Exhibition room in the medieval vaulted cellar

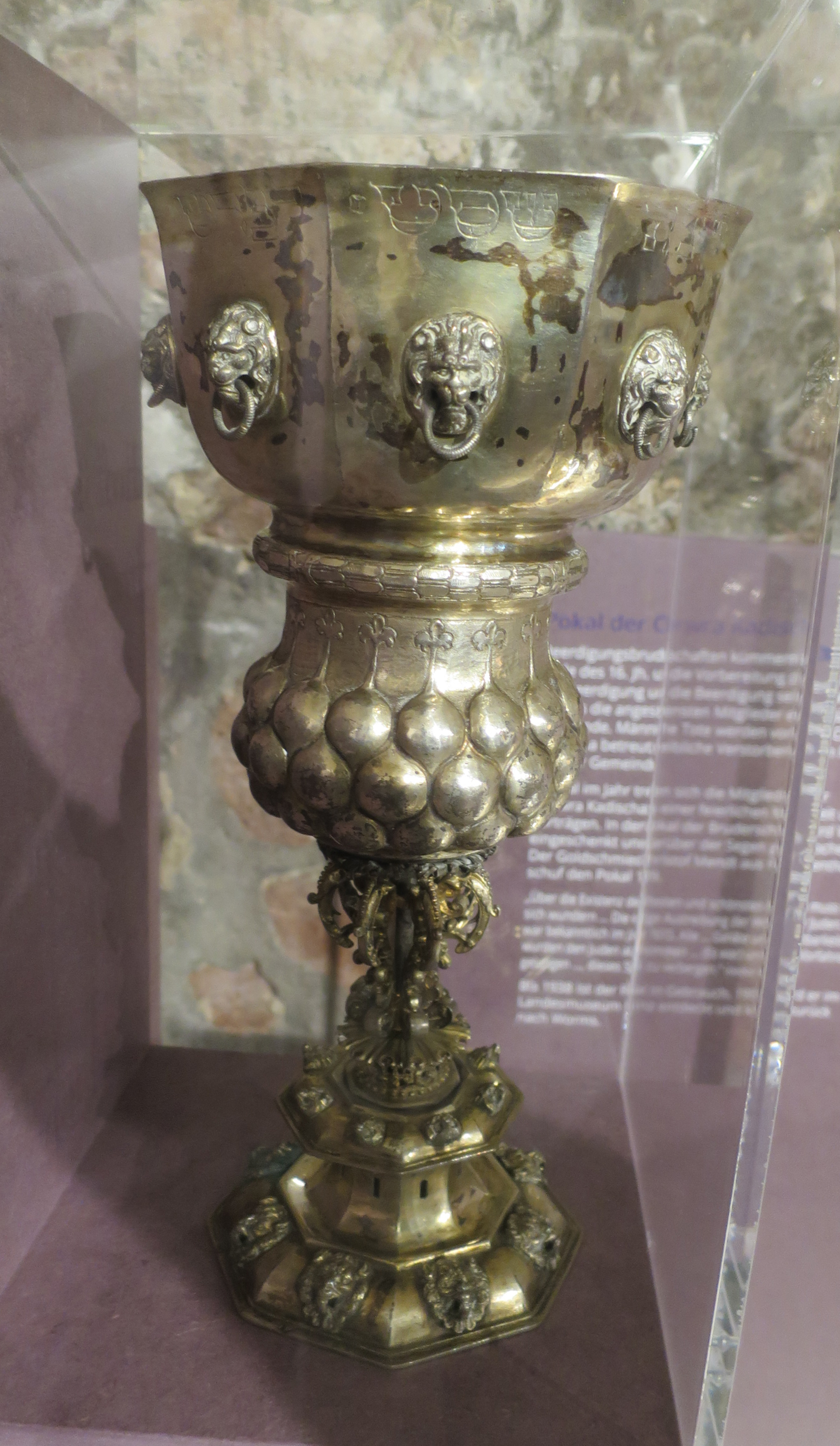
Cup of the Chevra Kadisha

In 2020, the permanent exhibition was closed and redesigned in preparation for the application of the SchUM Sites of Speyer, Worms, and Mainz for UNESCO World Heritage status, which they received a year later. Accordingly, the thematic focus of the museum also shifted to reflect this context. The exhibition presents nearly 1000 years of history across 158 m² and four rooms.

The permanent collection features recovered items from the pre-war collection, photographs and documents from the city archive, and donated objects from Jews originally from Worms. The exhibition is organized thematically:

=== Ground floor ===
The entrance gate framed by an enlarged decorative page from the Worms Mahzor. Displays include audio and video stations:

- UNESCO World Heritage SchUM
- The former Jewish Museum (1924–1938)
- The Worms Synagogue
- Women
- Mikveh
- Shoah
- Models: Worms Synagogue c. 1620, Jewish family at Passover Seder, Jewish wedding in 18th-century Worms, Sukkot

=== Basement ===
The partially medieval vaults contain structural remains of the original community building of the Jewish congregation:

- Golem figure, with earliest surviving references originating in Worms (entrance area)
- Jewish scholarship
- The silver cup of the Chevra Kadisha from 1609, made in Frankenthal. It is 29 cm tall and the oldest known surviving ritual object from the Worms community.
- Influence of the SchUM cities and the Taqqanot Qehillot SchUM ("Ordinances of the SchUM Communities")
- Jewish cemeteries of Worms and Mainz
- History of the Rashi House
- Jewish spaces – the topography of the Judengasse in Worms
- News from the SchUM cities since 1104–presented by Petra Gerster

== Visitor center ==
Since the inscription of the SchUM cities as UNESCO World Heritage sites, the Jewish Museum Worms has also served as a visitor center, at least until a dedicated World Heritage Information Center is established in Worms.

== Literature ==
- Katharina Rauschenberger: „Hier atmet noch die gute alte Zeit“. Das Heimatmuseum der israelitischen Gemeinde in Worms. In: Aschkenas. Zeitschrift für Geschichte und Kultur der Juden 12 (2002) = Anette Weber (Hg.): Themenheft Medinat Worms. Böhlau, Wien, S. 45–51.
- Fritz Reuter: Das Jüdische Museum Raschi-Haus in Worms. In: Der Wormsgau 15 (1987–1991), S. 10–29.
- Fritz Reuter: Jüdisches Worms: Raschi-Haus und Judengasse = Erweiterter Sonderdruck von „Das Jüdische Museum Raschi-Haus in Worms“. In: Der Wormsgau 15 (1987/1991). ISSN 0342-426X, S. 15–21.
- Fritz Reuter: Vom Erwachen des historischen Interesses am jüdischen Worms. In: Aschkenas. Zeitschrift für Geschichte und Kultur der Juden 12 (2002) = Anette Weber (Hg.): Themenheft Medinat Worms. Böhlau, Wien, S. 13–44.
- Susanne Urban, Gerold Bönnen, Günter Illner (Hg.): Die Ausstellung SchUM am Rhein. Vom Mittelalter in die Moderne. Wernersche Verlagsgesellschaft, Worms 2021. ISBN 978-3-88462-402-9
- Annette Weber: Der Hort der Mythen – das Museum der israelitischen Gemeinde in der Alten Synagoge zu Worms 1924–1938. In: Aschkenas. Zeitschrift für Geschichte und Kultur der Juden 12 (2002) = Anette Weber (Hg.): Themenheft Medinat Worms. Böhlau, Wien, S. 53–66.
- Annette Weber (Bearbeiterin): Katalog der Kultgegenstände aus dem Museum der israelitischen Gemeinde Worms anhand der Angaben und Fotos von Isidor Kiefer. In: Aschkenas. Zeitschrift für Geschichte und Kultur der Juden 12 (2002) = Anette Weber (Hg.): Themenheft Medinat Worms. Böhlau, Wien, S. 67–89.
