= Bayt Dakira =

- بيت الذاكرة
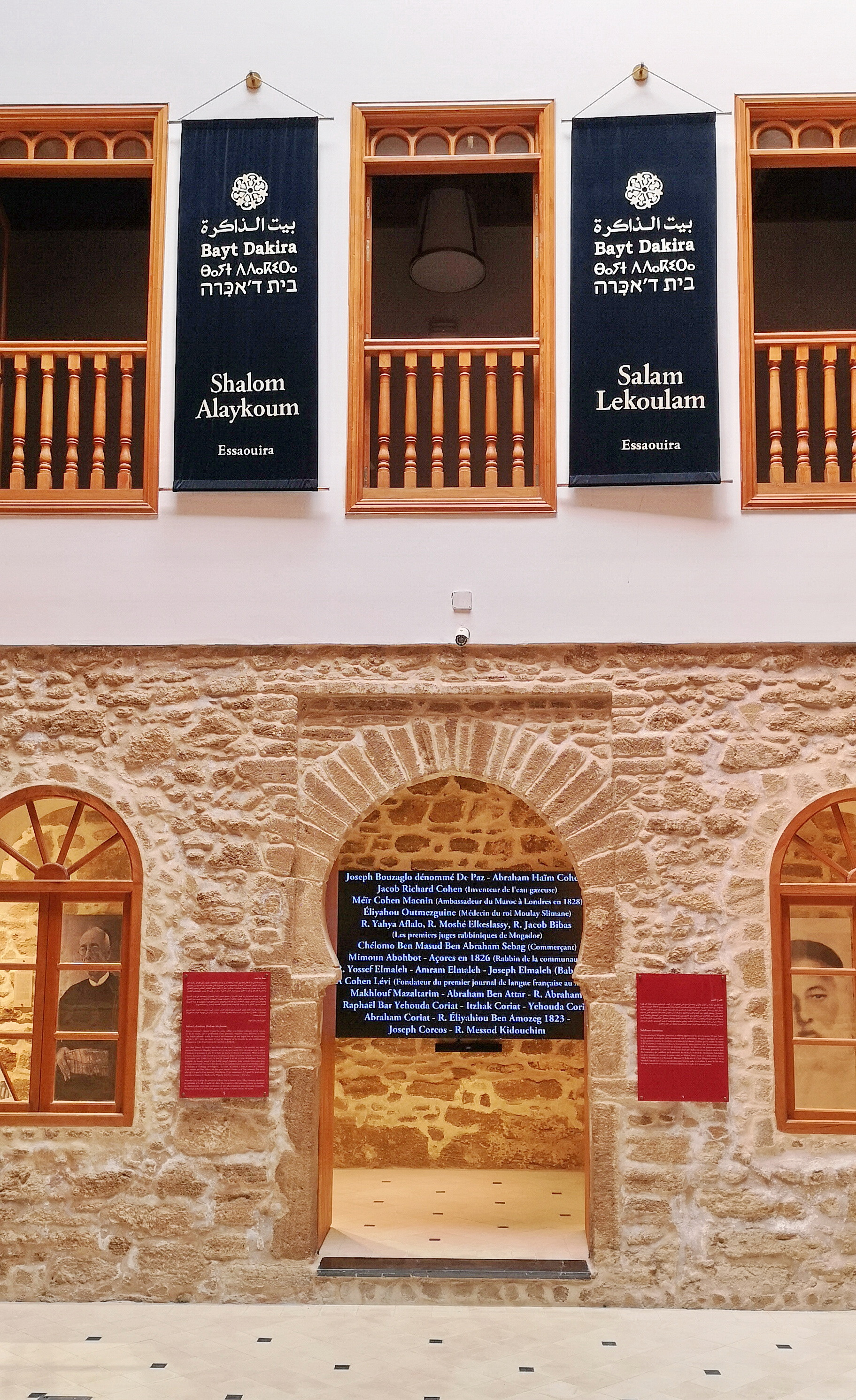
- Interior of the museum in 2019
- Established: 2020
- Location: Essaouira, Morocco
- Coordinates: 31.5134°N 9.7711°W
- Type: Jewish museum

Bayt Dakira or the House of Memory is a Jewish museum located in the Jewish quarter "Mellah" of Essaouira's old medina in Morocco.

The museum aims to be a spiritual space dedicated to the Jewish community of the city. It plays an important role in the preservation and valorisation of the Moroccan Jewish memory.

Through its exhibition of rare objects, texts and photographs, the museum seeks also to show the coexistence between Muslims and Jews in the city. Visitors are greeted by the expression "Shalom Aleykoum, Salam Lekoulam" which is a mix of Arabic and Hebrew to illustrate the friendship between Jews and Muslims.

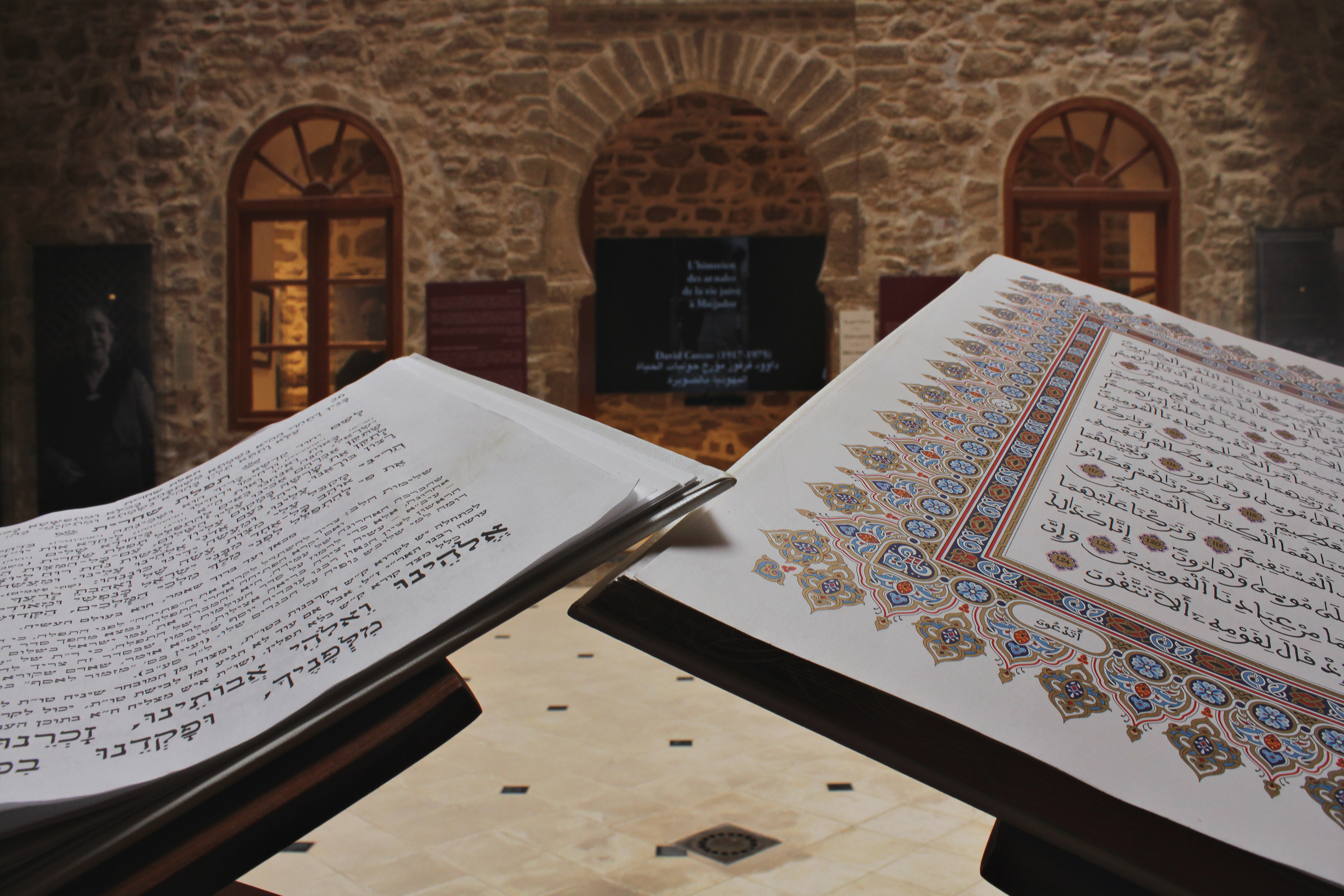
A Torah and a Quran side by side

The museum includes the Simon Attias Synagogue and the Haim and Célia Zafrani Research Center on the History of Relations between Judaism and Islam.

== See also ==
- Jews in Morocco
