= List of Jewish museums =

A Jewish museum is a museum which focuses upon Jews and may seek to explore and share the Jewish experience in a given area.

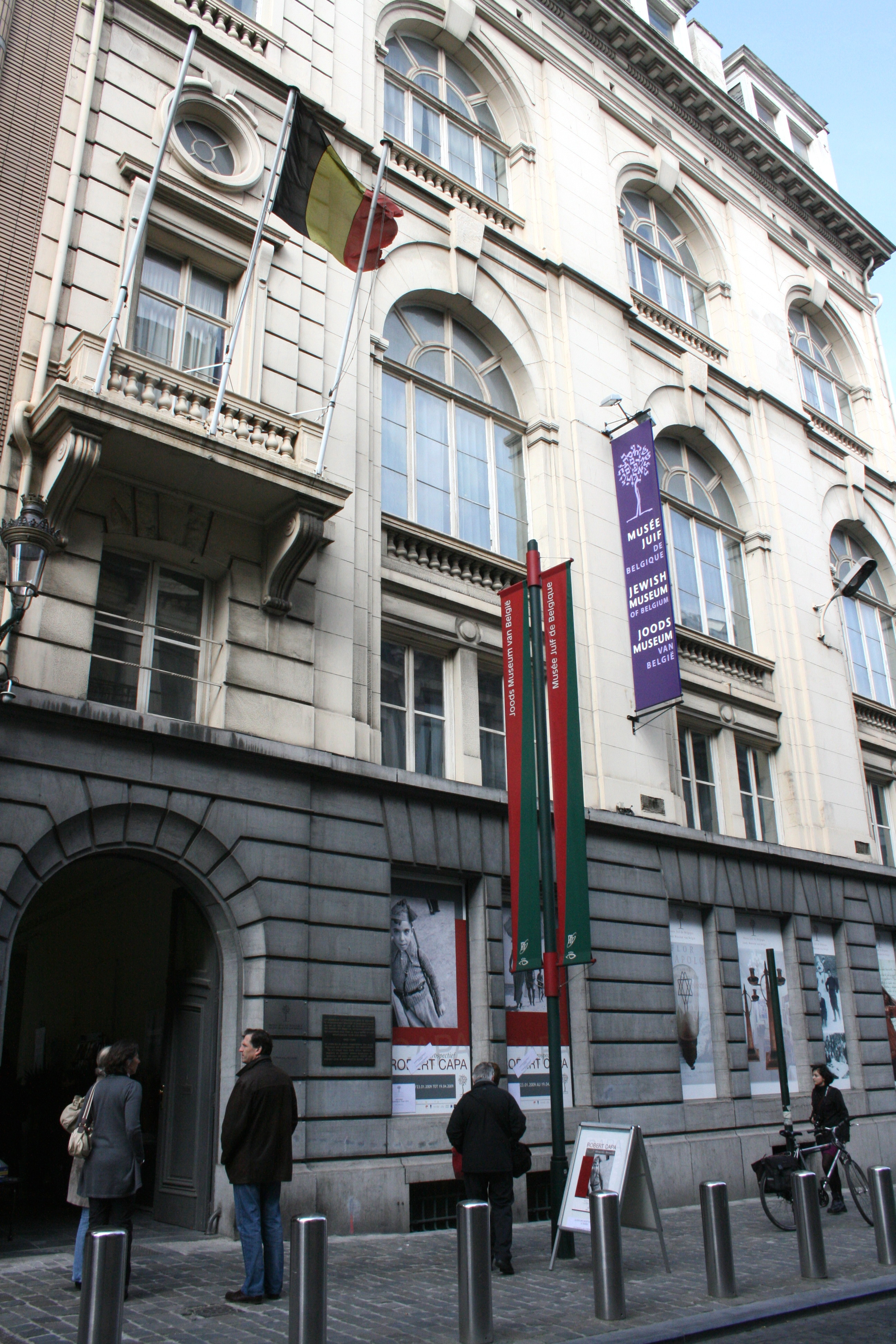
Jewish Museum of Belgium, in Brussels.

Notable Jewish museums include:

== Albania ==
- Solomon Museum, Berat

== Australia ==
- Jewish Museum of Australia, Melbourne, Victoria
- Sydney Jewish Museum

== Austria ==
- Jewish Museum Vienna
- Austrian Jewish Museum, Eisenstadt
- Jewish Museum of Hohenems

== Belarus ==
- Museum of Jewish History and Culture in Belarus

== Belgium ==
- Jewish Museum of Belgium

== Bosnia and Herzegovina ==
- Jewish Museum of Bosnia and Herzegovina, Sarajevo

== Brazil ==
- Jewish Museum of São Paulo
- Kahal Zur Israel Synagogue, Recife

== Canada ==
- Montreal Holocaust Museum
- Museum of Jewish Montreal
- Jewish Heritage Centre (Winnipeg)
- Saint John Jewish Historical Museum in New Brunswick

== China ==
- Shanghai Jewish Refugees museum

== Curacao ==
• Willemstad Jewish Museum

== Croatia ==
- Jewish Museum in Zagreb, Zagreb
- Dubrovnik Synagogue, Dubrovnik

== Czech Republic ==
- Jewish Museum in Prague

== Denmark ==
- Danish Jewish Museum, Copenhagen

== France ==
- Musée d'Art et d'Histoire du Judaïsme, (Museum of Jewish Art and History), Paris, and its predecessor Musée d'Art Juif
- Musée judéo-alsacien de Bouxwiller, Bouxwiller, Bas-Rhin

== Georgia ==
- David Baazov Museum of History of Jews of Georgia, Tbilisi

== Germany ==
- Jewish Museum Berlin
- Jewish Museum Emmendingen
- Jewish Museum Frankfurt
- Jewish Museum Munich
- Museum for Jewish History and Culture Aschaffenburg
- Jewish Museum Augsburg Swabia
- Jewish Museum Franconia
- Jewish Museum Gailingen
- Jewish Museum Rendsburg
- Jewish Museum Worms

== Greece ==
- Jewish Museum of Greece, Athens
- Jewish Museum of Rhodes
- Jewish Museum of Thessaloniki

== Guatemala ==
- Museum of the Holocaust (Guatemala) in Guatemala City

== Hungary ==
- Hungarian Jewish Museum and Archives, Budapest
- Miskolc Synagogue, Miskolc

== Iraq ==
- Shamash Jewish Museum, Baghdad

== Ireland ==
- Irish Jewish Museum, Dublin

== Italy ==
- Palazzo Pannolini, Bologna
- Synagogue of Casale Monferrato
- Museum of Italian Judaism and the Shoah, Ferrara
- Jewish Museum of Florence
- Jewish Museum of Rome
- Jewish Museum of Venice
- Jewish Museum Carlo e Vera Wagner, Trieste
- Jewish Museum Fausto Levi, Soragna
- St. Anna Synagogue Museum, Trani

== Latvia ==
- Jews in Latvia (museum), Riga

== Lithuania ==
- Vilna Gaon Jewish State Museum (Vilnius)

== Morocco ==
- Moroccan Jewish Museum, Casablanca
- Bayt Dakira, Essaouira
- Beit Yehuda Museum, Tangier

== Netherlands ==
- Joods Historisch Museum, Amsterdam

== Norway ==
- Jewish Museum in Oslo

== Poland ==
- Galicia Jewish Museum (Kraków)
- POLIN Museum of the History of Polish Jews (Warsaw)
- Warsaw Ghetto Museum
- The Judaica collection of Maksymilian Goldstein, once an independent museum, now part of the collection of the Lviv Crafts Museum

== Portugal ==
- Belmonte Jewish Museum
- Jewish Museum of Oporto
- Portuguese Jewish Museum

== Romania ==
- Jewish Museum (Bucharest)
- Northern Transylvania Holocaust Memorial Museum
- Muzeon - Jewish History Museum (Cluj)

== Russia ==
- Jewish Museum and Tolerance Center, Moscow

== Serbia ==
- Jewish Historical Museum, Belgrade

== Slovakia ==
- Museum of Jewish Culture, Bratislava

== Spain ==
- Casa de Sefarad, Córdoba
- Museum of the History of the Jews, Museo dels Jueus, in Girona
- Palace of the Forgotten, Granada
- Sephardic Museum (Granada)
- Sephardic Museum, Toledo

== Sweden ==
- Jewish Museum of Sweden

== Switzerland ==
- Jewish Museum of Switzerland, Basel

== Turkey ==
- Jewish Museum of Turkey, Istanbul

== Ukraine ==
- Museum of the History of Odesa Jews, Odesa
- Museum of Jewish History and the Holocaust in Ukraine in Menorah center, Dnipro.

== United Kingdom ==
- Jewish Museum London, England
- Manchester Jewish Museum, England

== United States ==
- Jewish History Museum (Tucson), Tucson, Arizona
- Magnes Collection of Jewish Art and Life, Berkeley, California
- Skirball Cultural Center, Los Angeles, California
- Contemporary Jewish Museum, San Francisco, California
- The Museum of the Southern Jewish Experience, New Orleans, Louisiana
- Jewish Museum of Maryland, Baltimore, Maryland
- Jewish Children's Museum, Brooklyn, New York
- Museum at Eldridge Street, Manhattan, New York
- Herbert & Eileen Bernard Museum of Judaica at Congregation Emanu-El of New York, Manhattan, New York
- Jewish Museum (Manhattan), Manhattan, New York
- Museum of Jewish Heritage, Manhattan, New York
- Maltz Museum of Jewish Heritage, Beachwood, Ohio
- National Museum of American Jewish History, Philadelphia, Pennsylvania
- Lillian & Albert Small Capital Jewish Museum, Washington DC
- Jewish Museum Milwaukee, Milwaukee, Wisconsin
- William Breman Jewish Heritage & Holocaust Museum, Atlanta, Georgia

== See also ==
- List of Holocaust memorials and museums
