= Zülfaris Synagogue =

Former synagogue in Instabul, Turkey

- Turkish: Zülfaris Sinagogu
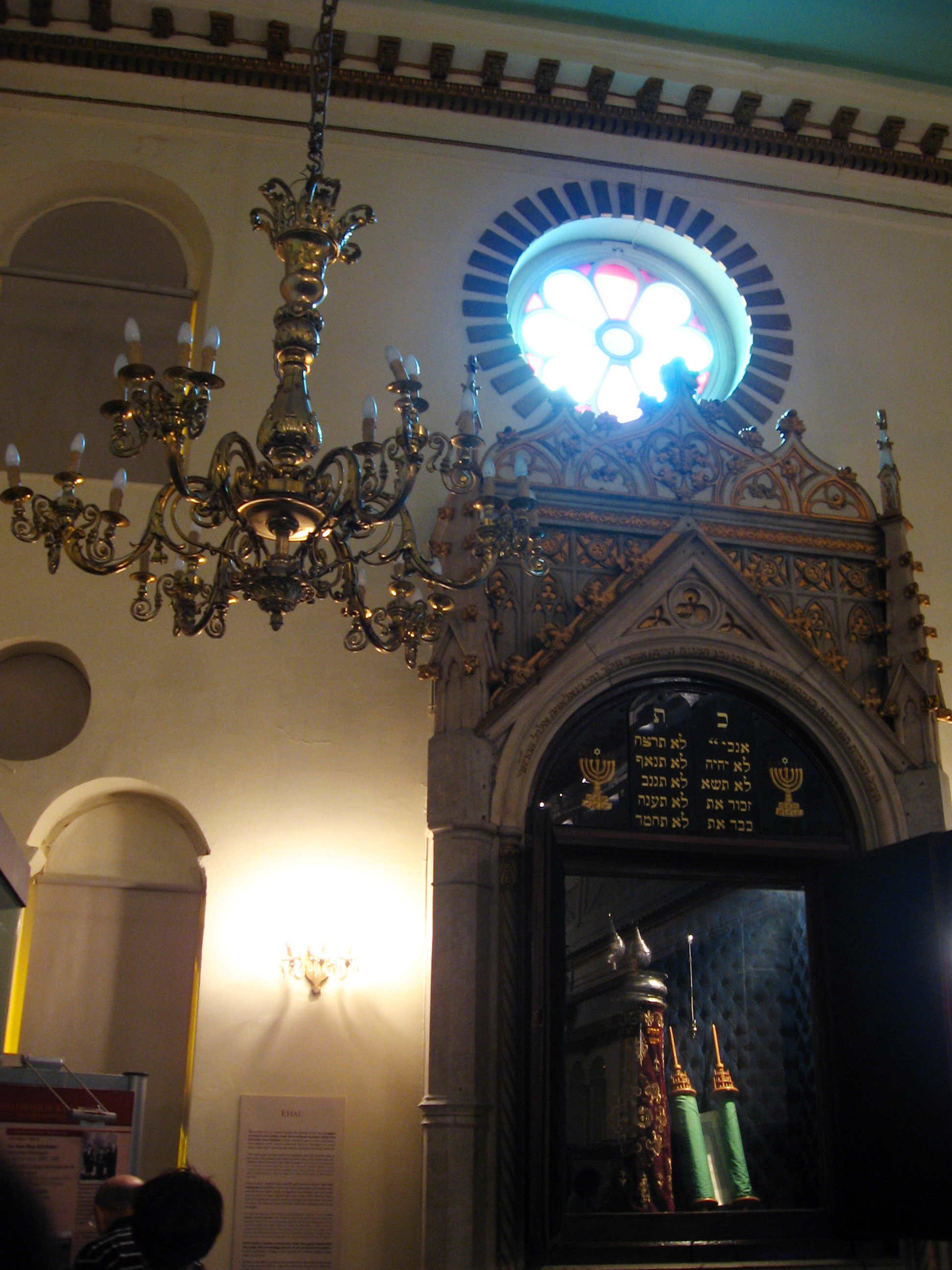
- The ehal of the former synagogue, in 2007

- Location of the former synagogue, now museum in Istanbul

Religion
- Affiliation: Judaism (former)
- Rite: Nusach Sefard (Eastern)
- Ecclesiastical or organizational status: Synagogue (1823–1985); Jewish museum (since 2001)
- Status: Closed (as a synagogue); Repurposed

Location
- Location: 39 Büyük Hendek Street, Beyoğlu, Istanbul
- Country: Turkey
- Interactive map of Zülfaris Synagogue
- Coordinates: 41°01′36″N 28°58′22″E

Architecture
- Type: Synagogue architecture
- Completed: 1823; 1904 (reconstruction)
- Materials: Stone

The Zülfaris Synagogue (Turkish: Zülfaris Sinagogu), also known as the Kal Kadoş Galata Synagogue, is a former Jewish congregation and synagogue located at 39 Büyük Hendek Street, in the Beyoğlu neighbourhood of Istanbul, Turkey. Completed in 1823 and used as a synagogue until 1985, the building was repurposed in 2001 as a Jewish museum.

== History ==
There is evidence that a synagogue building existed in 1671, and its foundations suggest that another structure was built during the colony of the Republic of Genoa. It was recorded as "Holy Sinavi (Synagogue) in Galata" or "Kal Kadoş Galata", it was named as "Zülfaris" which is thought to have derived from the Persian word "Zülf-ü Arus", meaning "the fringe of a bride". However the actual building was re-erected over its original foundations presumably in the early 19th century, probably in 1823.

== See also ==
- History of the Jews in Turkey
- List of synagogues in Turkey
