= Jewish Museum of São Paulo =

Jewish museum in São Paulo, Brazil

- Portuguese: Museu Judaico de São Paulo
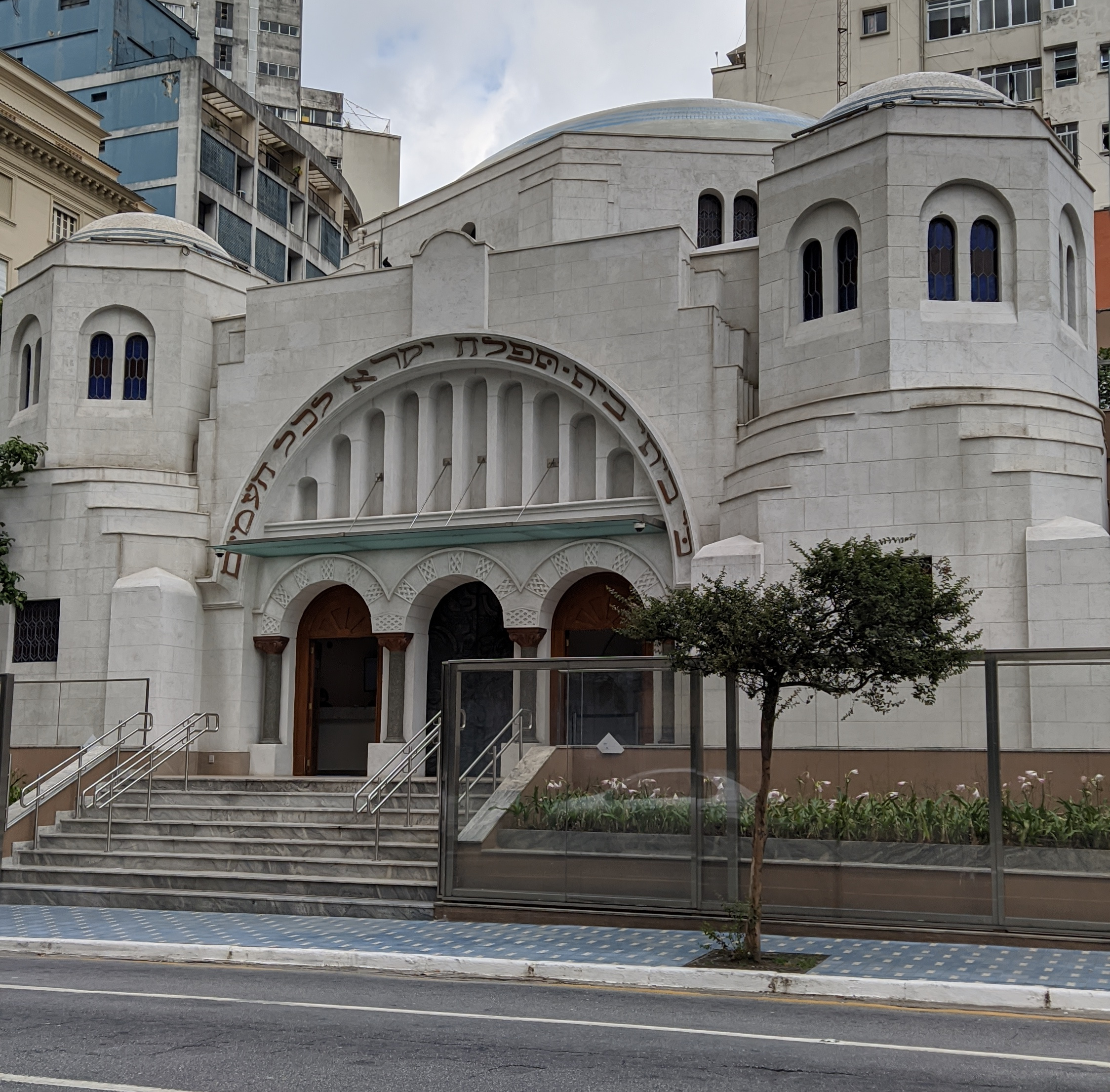
- The entrance to the synagogue and museum, in 2021

- Location of the museum in São Paulo
- Established: 5 December 2021
- Location: 105 - 1º Rua Avanhandava, Bela Vista, São Paulo
- Coordinates: 23°33′03″S 46°38′44″W
- Type: Jewish museum
- Owner: Portuguese: Congregação Israelita de São Paulo Templo Beth El
- Public transit access: Higienópolis–Mackenzie
- Website: museujudaicosp.org.br

The Jewish Museum of São Paulo (Portuguese: Museu Judaico de São Paulo) is a Jewish museum in São Paulo, Brazil. It holds exhibits on Jewish life in Brazil and a collection of over 2,000 items brought over by immigrants to Brazil.

The museum's building originated in 1928 as the Beth El Synagogue, a Byzantine Revival-style synagogue and was repurposed with additional functionality as a museum from 2004. Extensive renovations were completed over the course of 17 years, and the museum opened in 2021. The Beth‑El building was restored with funds from the Cultural Preservation Programme of the Federal Foreign Office of the Government of Germany.

== See also ==
- History of the Jews in Brazil
- List of museums in Brazil
- List of Jewish museums
