= Palazzo Pannolini, Bologna =

Palace in Bologna, Italy

Coordinates: 44.4955°N 11.3485°E

Palazzo Pannolini
- Interactive map of Palazzo Pannolini

General information
- Type: Palace
- Architectural style: Renaissance
- Location: Via Valdonica 1/5, Bologna, Emilia-Romagna, Italy
- Current tenants: Jewish Museum of Bologna

The Palazzo Pannolini is a Renaissance-style palace located on Via Valdonica 1/5 in Bologna, region of Emilia Romagna, Italy. The palace, owned by the comune, since 1999 houses the Museo Ebraico di Bologna or Jewish Museum of Bologna.

== History ==
A palace at the site had been constructed by the bread merchant, Francesco Pannolini. In his will of 1595, he left the property for the creation of a school for poor children, intending to study the trade as merchants. By 1619, the Collegio Pannolini had been created. The college was closed in 1765 by Pope Benedict XIV, and the site was transferred to the Academy of Sciences. The Malvasia family acquired the structure, and merged it with their adjacent Palazzo Mavasia. The museum incorporates part of the Malvasia palace.

== Ghetto of Bologna ==
A Jewish community had lived in Bologna since the 14th century. Jews were circumscribed to a ghetto starting in 1556 by Pope Paul IV. The Jewish district in Bologna was present just southwest of the Museum, in an area delineated by the intersection of via del Carro and via Zamboni, via Oberdan where an arch looks onto vicolo Mandria, and the start of via de' Giudei. The entrances to the Ghetto were sealed from sunset to sunrise.

By 1569, the Jewish community of Bologna was expelled by Pius V. Allowed to return in 1586 under Sixtus V, they were again expelled in 1593 under Pope Clement VIII, and did not return until the Napoleonic occupation. In 1593, nearly 900 people left the city, mostly taking refuge with the Jewish community in Ferrara.

Jews returned to Bologna in the 19th century. It was in Bologna in 1858, that Edgardo Mortara was stolen from his parents. By the Second World War, over a thousand Jews lived in Bologna. The anti-Jewish laws of 1938 forced 51 Jewish professors to retire from the University of Bologna and 492 foreign Jewish students were dismissed. Only Italian Jewish students already enrolled at the university were allowed to finish. Jewish professional were no longer permitted to practice. With the German occupation of Italy in September 1943, persecution increased. About 114 Jews from Bologna were deported to Auschwitz, where nearly all of them died.
