= Mahzor of Worms =

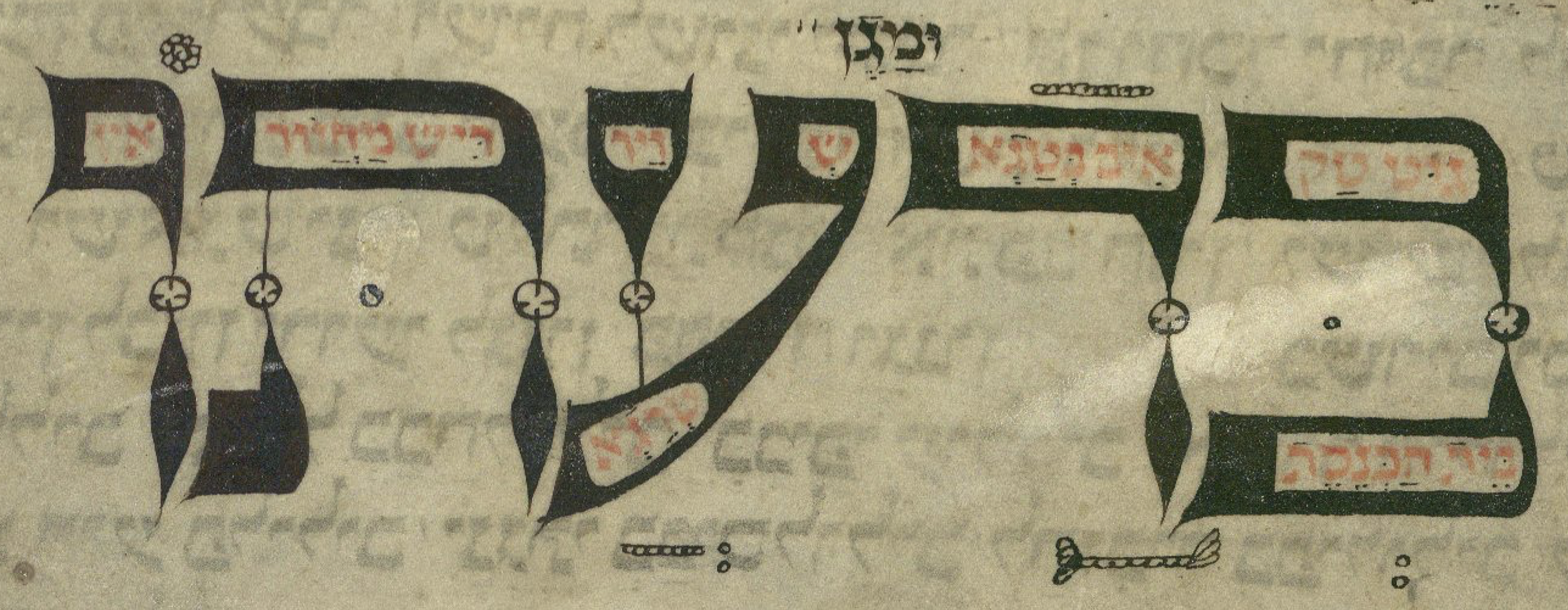
One of the oldest known passages in a language identifiable as Yiddish, in the Maḥazor of Worms. The sentence is written in red within the letters of the Hebrew title. The text is a rhyming couplet, fully vocalized.

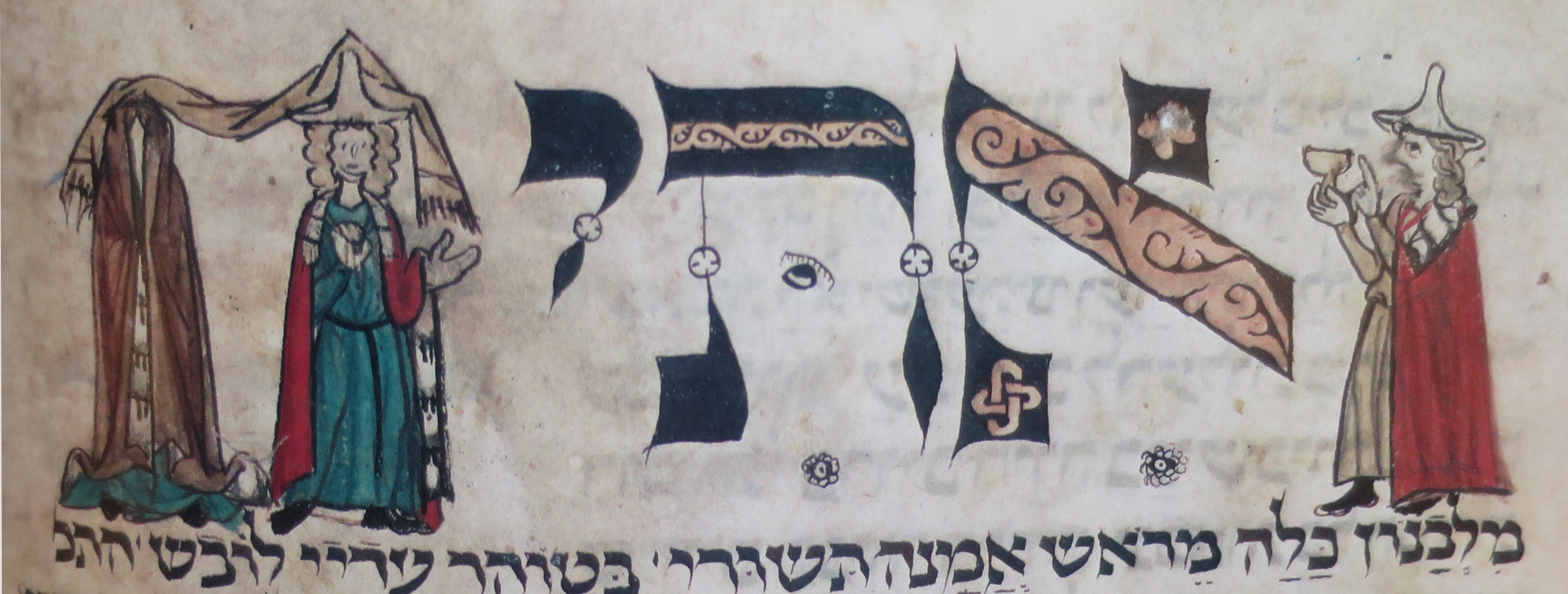

The Mahzor of Worms is a thirteenth century illuminated manuscript. Dated to 1272, it is a Mahzor, a Jewish festival liturgical prayerbook, and the locus of the first written Yiddish. The scribe who copied the manuscript was Simhah ben Yehuda Ha-Sofer and it was illustrated by Shemiah Ha-Zarfati.

The first volume was completed likely in Würzburg. The second volume was produced at a later time, probably in Worms, where the two volumes were used by the local Jewish community.
