= Jewish Museum Carlo e Vera Wagner =

Coordinates: 45.6491369°N 13.7750379°E

The Jewish Museum “Carlo and Vera Wagner", is located in via del Monte 5/7, Trieste, Italy. It was inaugurated in 1993, by the initiative of Mario Stock together with the generous support of the Wagner-de Polo family.

== The Museum ==
The Museum is located in two floors of a building which holds particular historical significance for the Trieste Jewish Community, and which has been declared a site of national interest. Previously a Jewish hospital, in the first decade of the twentieth century via del Monte 5-7 hosted the local Jewish Agency which helped refugees fleeing Nazism as they left from Trieste for Palestine and the Americas. On this site, an Ashkenazi oratory remained in use until 1987: this remains part of the Museum's structure.

The artifacts held by the Museum include the Triestine Jewish Community's collection of Judaica, including ritual objects of art which were collected after the inauguration of the Tempio Maggiore in Piazza Giotti, following the closure of the four Synagogues (scole). The collections are composed of silver items (particularly precious are the 18th century pieces made in Venice); fabrics; documents and books which record both the public and familial dimensions of Jewish life. Amongst the former owners and donors of these objects - the oldest being a Sefer breastplate engraved with gothic figures, which dates back to 1593 – we find echoes of the great families of Triestine Jews who played leading roles in the city's history. This Museum also holds several historical documents of great significance, including a ledger of the mid-17th century and the Diplomas granted in 1771 by the Empress Maria Teresa of Habsburg.

There is also material relating to the history and memory of the Triestine Jews deported to extermination camps during the Holocaust. There is a moving collection of personal objects taken by the Nazis. Hidden inside jute sacks, these belongings were discovered by the Allies and sent to Rome, where they were forgotten for decades in the basement of the Ministry of Treasury. In 2000 these items were returned to the Jewish Community of Trieste, which decided to display a number of the objects in this Museum, and to donate a small but significant selection to the Civic Museum of the Risiera di San Sabba and the Yad Vashem Museum in Jerusalem.

In 2014–15, the Jewish Community of Trieste undertook a complete refurbishment of the museum, led by Annalisa di Fant. There were two main goals: to promote its rich array of artifacts, which in quality and quantity are amongst the most important in Italy, and which provide a unique insight into the Jewish life in Friuli Venezia Giulia; and to ensure that the exhibition is as informative and engaging as possible for visitors, from within Italy and from further afield - thanks to the English translation of all the texts - with particular attention to schools.

On 14 September 2014, to mark the European Day of Jewish Culture, the first part of the renovated Museum was opened to the public: the section dedicated to culture, which is located on the first floor of via del Monte 7.

On 29 March 2015 even the ground floor was reopened, at via del Monte 5, with sections dedicated to religion, the Jewish Community's history, the Holocaust and the connection with Eretz Israel.

The entire set-up is enriched with audiovisual contents.
