= Museum of Jewish History and Culture in Belarus =

Museum in Minsk, Belarus

Coordinates: 53.92°N 27.56°E

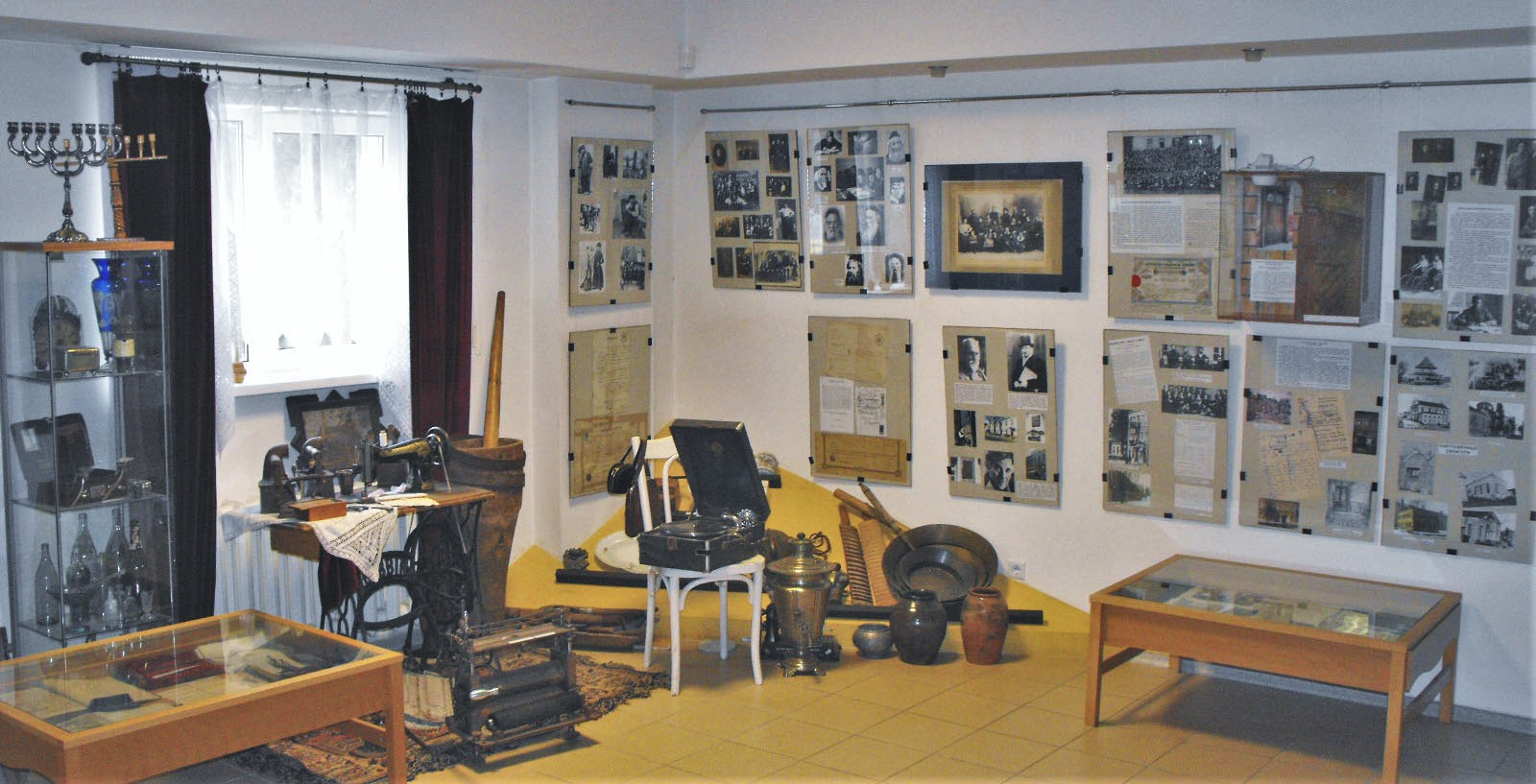
Museum of Jewish History and Culture

Museum of Jewish History and Culture in Belarus (Belarusian: Музей гісторыі і культуры яўрэяў Беларусі, romanized: Muzey historyi i kultury yawreyaw Belarusi) is a small museum in Minsk, Belarus. It was founded in 2002 by historian Inna Gerasimova in conjunction with the American Jewish Joint Distribution Committee. The Joint Committee still financially supports it, along with the local Belarusian Jewish community. Offices for local Jewish community services are located in the same building, on the Minsk Jewish campus.

The museum, despite lacking accreditation and an advisory board, is nonetheless working to preserve the memory of the early Jewish communities in Minsk and narrate their story during World War II. Besides exhibits, the museum staff also conducts outreach and educational programs, such as public forums and the "Righteous Among the Nations" program (which honors non-Jews who worked to help the Jewish community). Nearby the museum is Zaslaŭski Memorial, the site of at least one mass murder of Jewish citizens.

== Museum history ==
In 1998, Inna Gerasimova created the first exhibit and began to gather material for future permanent exhibits. When she retired in 2012, she had collected a large volume of Jewish objects and artifacts, including photos, everyday utensils or items, documents, and religious books. In 2012, Vadim Akopyan became the director of the museum. Thanks to the contributions of museum volunteers, over 10,000 artifacts have been collected. Most artifacts are ordinary objects; for instance, since many of the Jews who formerly lived in Belarus were craftsmen by trade, sewing machines and other means of livelihood are on display. Many of them have stories associated with how they came to be at the museum, as is the case for a broken bottle that once held a message from Jewish partisans during the war.

== Exhibits ==
The museum has several permanent exhibits that strive to present the history of Jews in Belarus, especially during the Holocaust. The main exhibits are accompanied by seasonal or rotating exhibits that cover topics from Belarusian synagogue architecture to daily life for Jews and Jewish partisans during World War II. A virtual tour of the museum is available in Russian and in English.

== See also ==
- The Holocaust in Belarus
- List of Holocaust memorials and museums
