= Los Olvidados (disambiguation) =

Los Olvidados ("The Forgotten Ones") is a 1950 Mexican film directed by Luis Buñuel.

Los Olvidados may also refer to:

- Los Olvidados, an American skate punk band that became Drunk Injuns
- Los Olvidados, art work by Esteban Villa
- Los Olvidados, 1997 album by Los Muertos de Cristo
- "Los Olvidados", track on Fire Music (Archie Shepp album) (1965)
- "Los Olvidados", track on album Volumen 5 by Los Fabulosos Cadillacs (1990)
- "Los Olvidados", episode of Spanish news show Salvados about the 2006 Valencia Metro derailment
- Palacio de los Olvidados ("Palace of the Forgotten"), a museum in Granada, Spain
- Los olvidados de Filipinas, 2005 novel by Lorenzo Mediano
