= Szwarc =

Szwarc is a Polonized-Yiddish version of the German surname Schwartz.

The surname may refer to:

- Andrzej Stanisław Szwarc (born 1951), Polish historian, University of Warsaw professor
- Arthur Szwarc (born 1995), Canadian volleyball player
- Dawid Szwarc, better known as Juliusz Hibner (1912–1994), brigadier general in the Polish People's Army and recipient of the title of Hero of Soviet Union
- Halina Szwarc (1923–2002), member of the Polish resistance during the Second World War
- Jan Szwarc (born 1946), Polish politician
- Jeannot Szwarc (1939–2025), French-American director of film and television
- Jerzy Szwarc, LOT Polish Airlines Flight 16 first officer
- Michael Szwarc (1909–2000), Polish-Jewish born British and American polymer chemist who discovered and studied ionic living polymerization
- Marek Szwarc (1892–1958), Polish-Jewish painter and sculptor
- Sabina Szwarc (1923–2021), Polish-American ophthalmologist and memoirist
- Samuel Schwarz, born Samuel Szwarc (1880–1953), Polish-Portuguese Jewish mining engineer, archaeologist, and historian
- Tereska Torrès born Tereska Szwarc (1920–2012), Polish-Jewish born French writer,
