= Sephardic Museum (Toledo) =

Jewish museum in Toledo, Spain

- Museo Sefardí
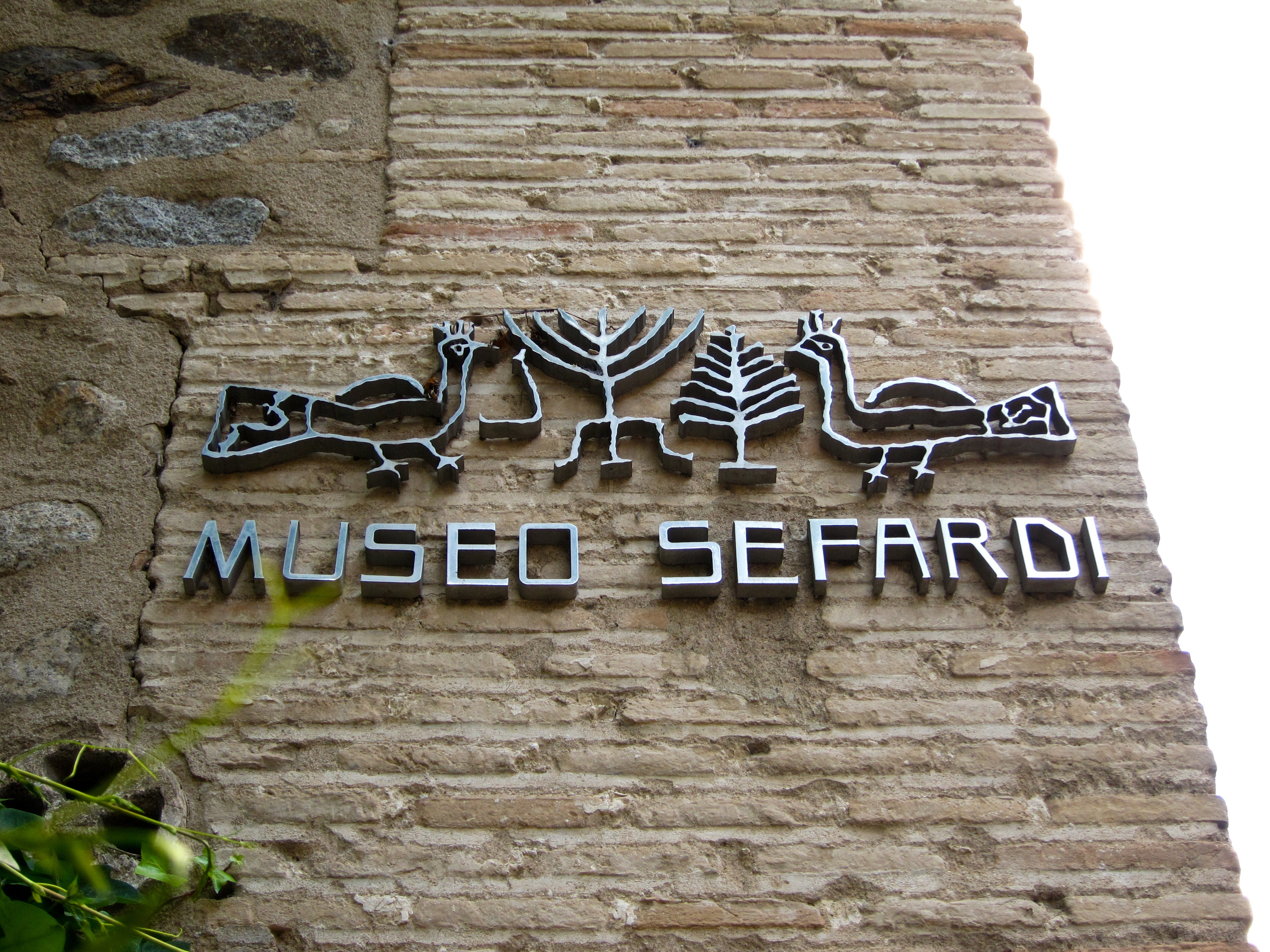
- Established: 13 June 1971
- Location: Calle Samuel Levi 2, Toledo, Spain
- Coordinates: 39.8558°N 4.0293°W
- Owner: General State Administration

The Sephardic Museum (Spanish: Museo Sefardí) is a museum in Toledo, Spain, devoted to the Jewish cultural heritage in Spain, as well as of the Sephardim, the descendants of the Jews who lived on the Iberian peninsula until 1492. It occupies the former convent of the Knights of Calatrava, annexed to the Synagogue of El Tránsito. It is one of the National Museums of Spain and it is attached to the Ministry of Culture.

== History ==
A 1964 decree created the institution and installation work began the following year. The museum was opened to visitors on 13 June 1971. In this way, aspirations dating back at least to 1915 became a reality, as many "testimonies of Jewish culture as may be found scattered throughout the Museums of Spain" were collected in one building . The collection was originally hosted in the halls formerly occupied by the archives of the orders of Calatrava and Alcántara.

In accordance with Royal Decree 1305/2009, of July 31, creating the Spanish Museum Network, the Museo Sefardí is one of the National Museums owned and managed by the State and attached to the Ministry of Culture.

== History of the Jewish people ==
The first room shows the history, geography and culture of the Jewish people in the Middle East, where according to the biblical writings the traditions that endured in their daily life originated. Archaeological objects dated between the 2000 B.C. and the 1st century A.C. are shown, as well as a variety of cultural objects related to Jewish life, what this is and what it means, as well as the beliefs and customs of the Jews. This collection highlights a Torah (sacred book of the Judaism, the compilation of the first five books of the Hebrew Bible, the Pentateuch) and other liturgical objects.

== The Jews in the Iberian peninsula ==
The following elements of the Jewish presence in Spain are described: their arrival in the Iberian Peninsula, their life in Roman and Visigoth times, their development in the Al-Andalus as well as in the Christian kingdoms during the 13th and 15th centuries, the conversions, the Inquisition and the expulsion in 1492.

In the north courtyard, is a necropolis, where some of the sepulchral tombstones of Jewish characters from different parts of Spain are displayed. In the courtyard the archaeological remains of some possible public baths of the old Jewish quarter of Toledo and the ground of the old Torah ark (main wall) of the synagogue are conserved.

== The Sephardim and their way of life ==
The toponym Sepharad appears in the Bible in verse 20 of the book of Obadiah; since the Middle Ages the word Sepharad has been used in the Hebrew language to designate Spain or the Iberian Peninsula in general and, later, in academia and other languages of culture, to Jewish Spain in particular. The use by extension of the adjective Sephardic is also relatively frequent to designate the Jew of the medieval Sepharad, according to the meaning of the word Sephardic in the Hebrew language.

This section is shown in the women's gallery, a special room, where the women who attended the synagogue could follow the liturgy. As in other cultures, Judaism does not allow women to do this in the prayer room. In the women's gallery space, which preserves part of its original plasterwork decoration, there are showcases related to the daily life of the Sephardim, including their birth, education, main festivals and death.

== Gallery ==
Museum collection

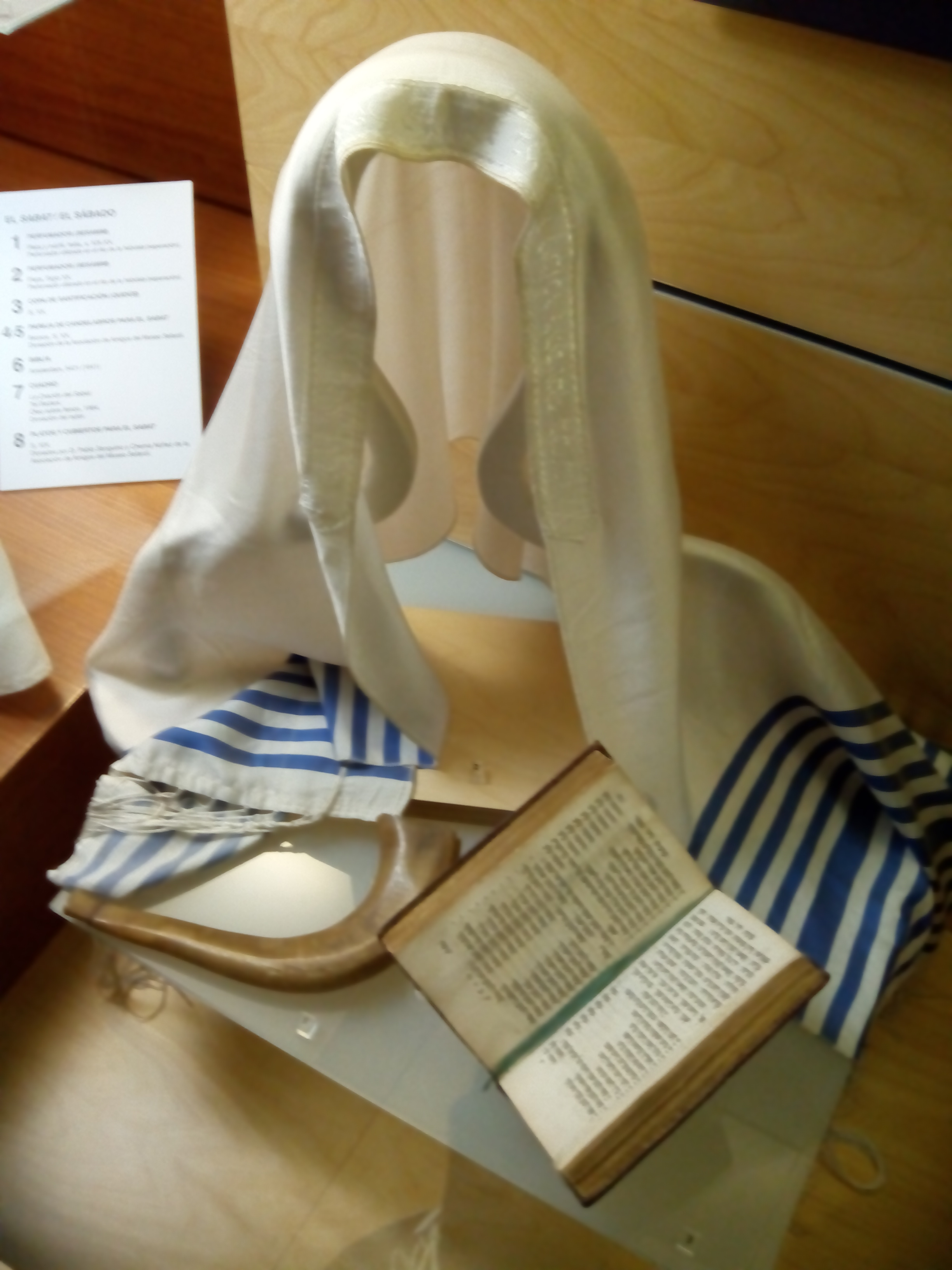

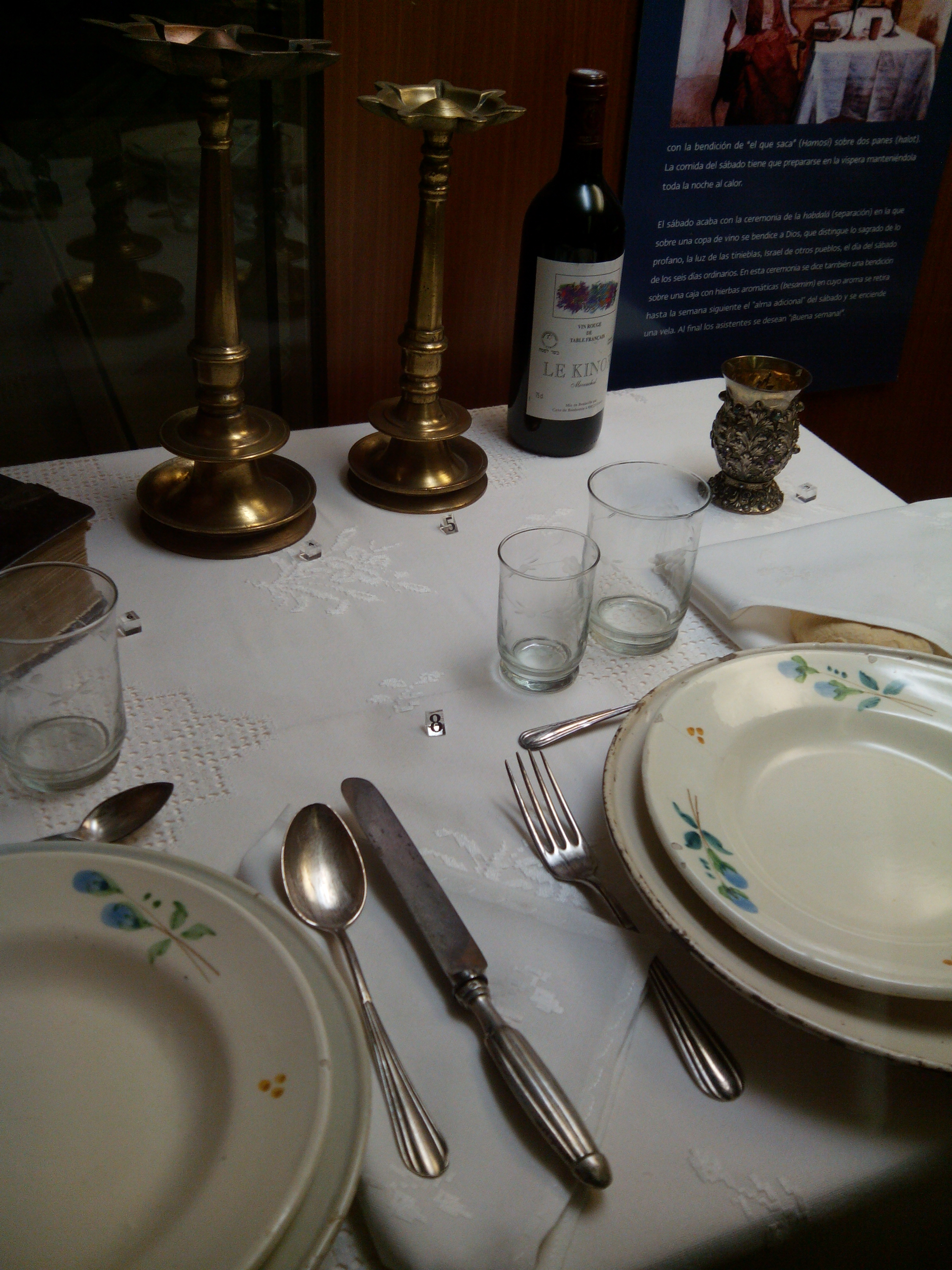

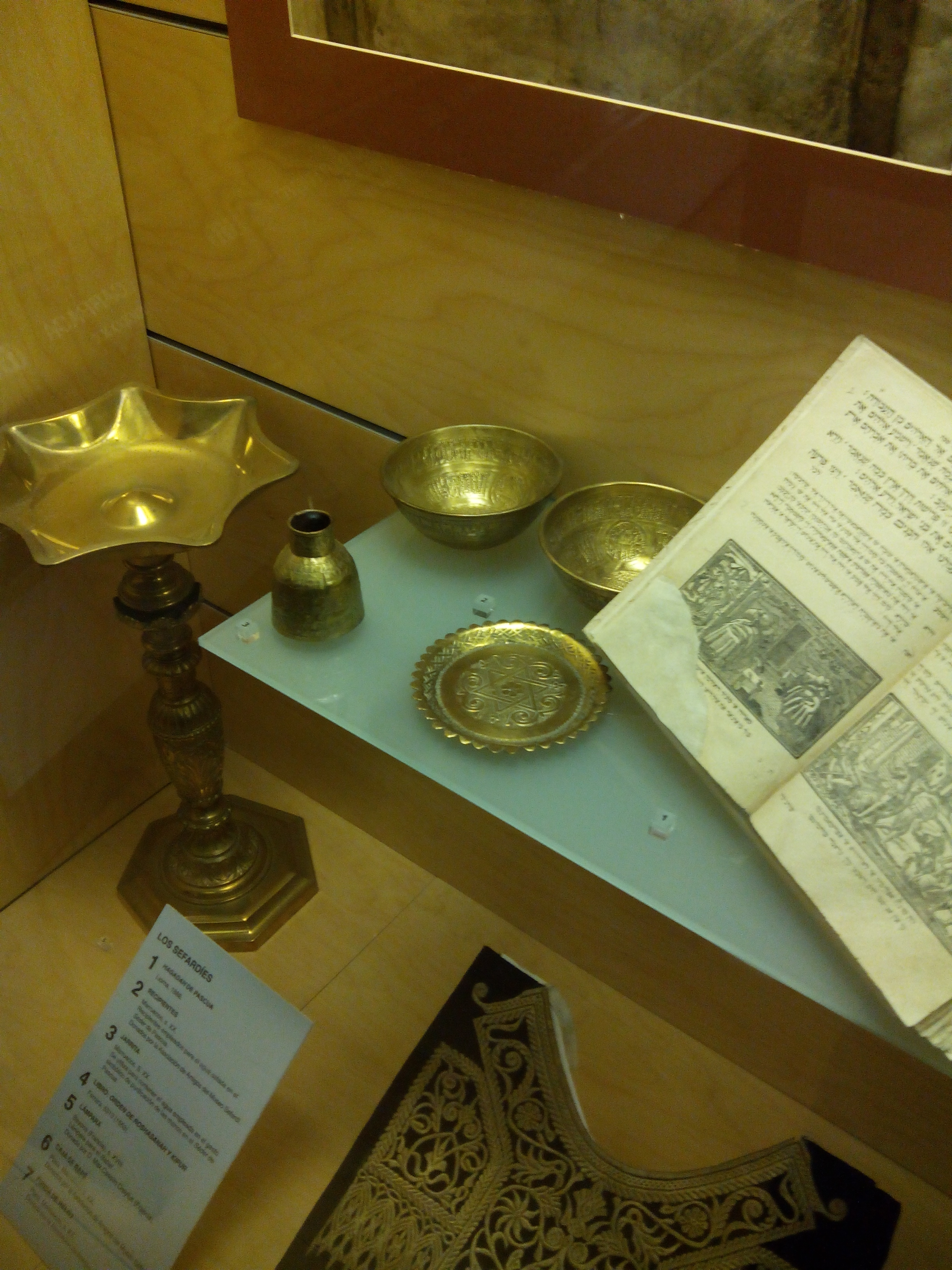

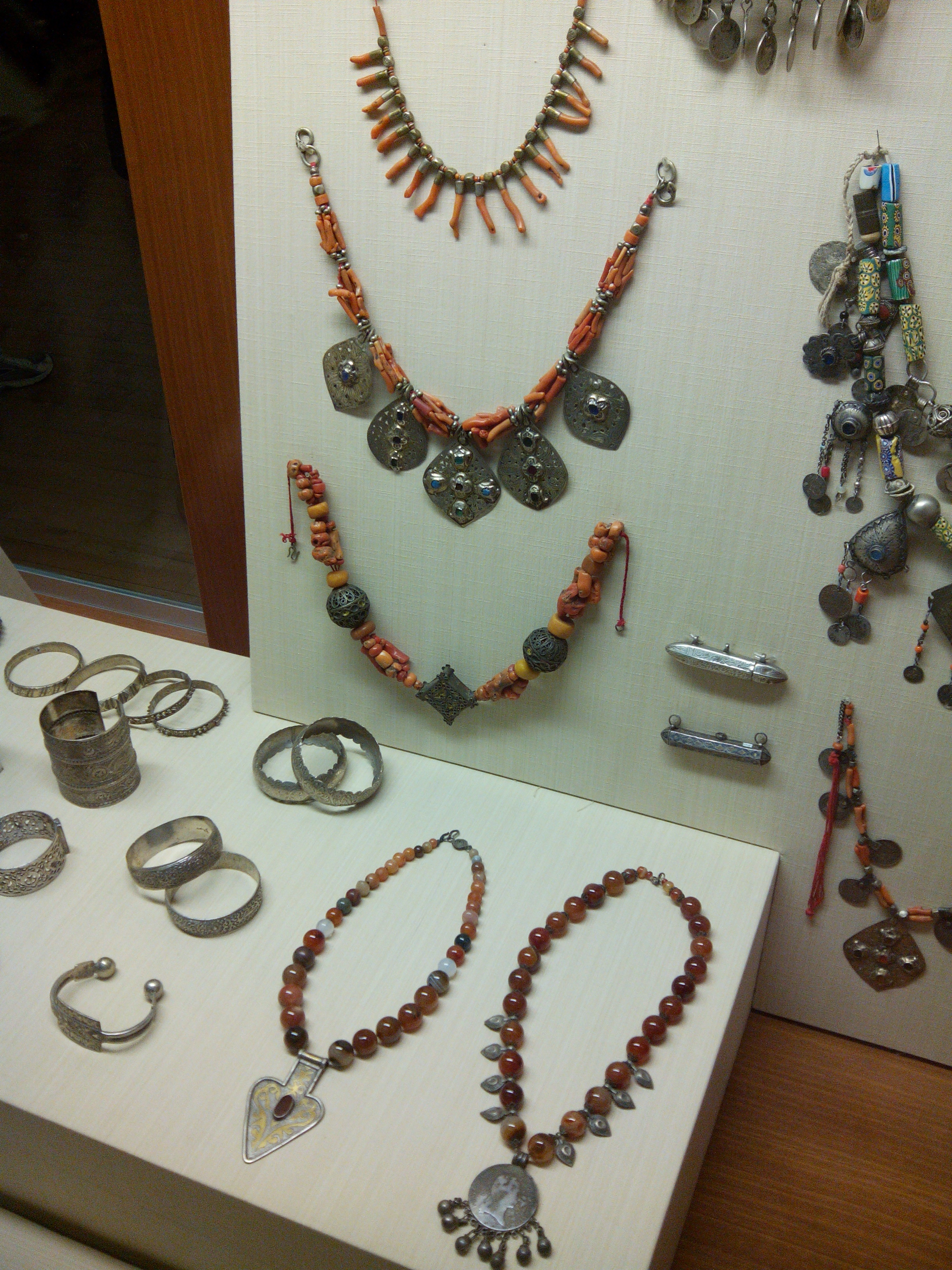

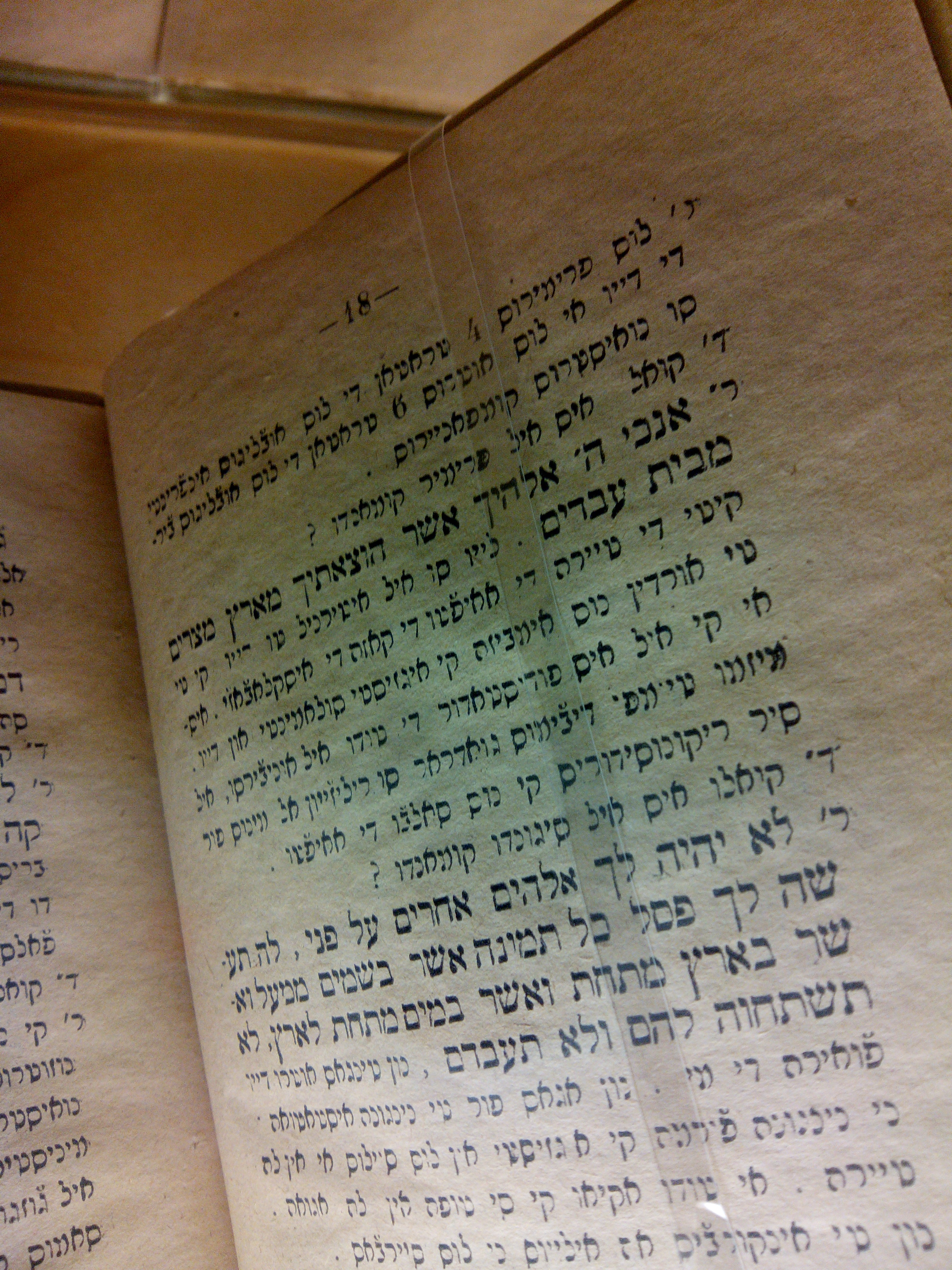

== See also ==
- History of the Jews in Spain
- Belmonte Jewish Museum
- Jewish Quarter Museum, Granada
- Red de Juderías de España
