= Palace of the Forgotten =

Coordinates: 37.1785°N 3.5938°W

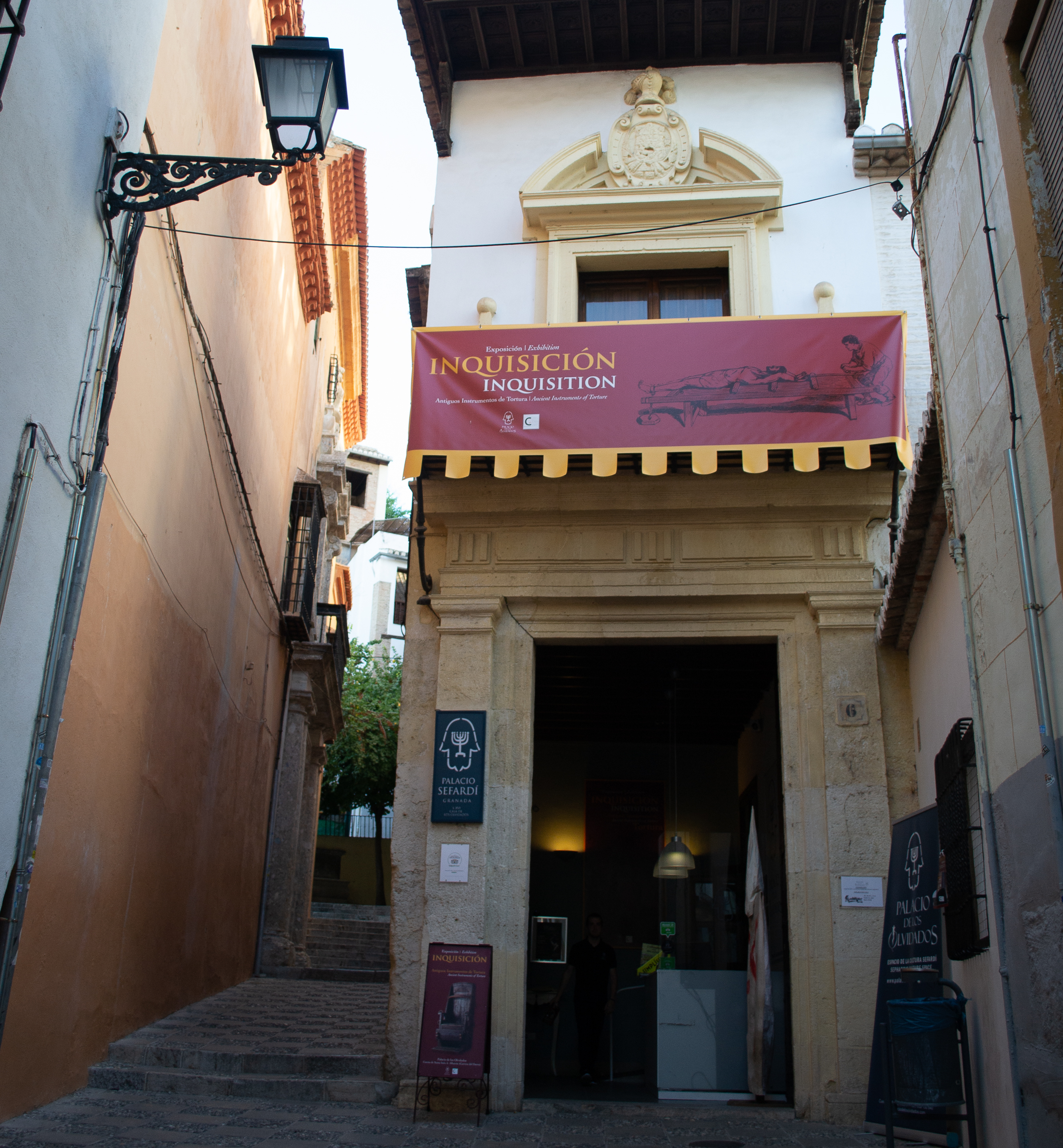
Palace of the Forgotten, main entrance.

The Palace of the Forgotten (Spanish: Palacio de los Olvidados) is a museum in Granada, Spain, dedicated to the Spanish Inquisition, and Granada's and Andalusia's heritage. The building is located in the Albaicín, a neighbourhood declared a World Heritage Site by UNESCO in 1994 as an extension of the monumental complex of the Alhambra and the Generalife.

The museum occupies the Casa-Palacio de Santa Inés (Palace-House of St. Agnes), a restored 16th-century building declared Bien de Interés Cultural (heritage site of cultural interest). On its façade there is an unidentified coat of arms, with features suggesting it belonged to a converted Jew who intended to show based on heraldry his status of pureza de sangre (blood purity). The museum, opened in 2014, also offers guided tours.

== Description ==
With its over 7534 sq. ft (700 m^{2}) of exhibition space and unique great halls, the museum's terraces serve as vantage points for views of the Alhambra and the Albaicín. In recent years the museum has been offering two permanent exhibitions: "Inquisition: Ancient Instruments of Torture" and "Interactive Flamenco".

=== Historical context ===
There are few remains left today of Jewish Granada, but Jews formed an important community in this classic Andalusian city, with great poets, statesmen, scientists and philosophers, who contributed and enriched the "City of the Alhambra". The Palace of the Forgotten was conceived as an exhibition space dedicated to the Sephardic culture of Granada, owing its name to "a people that was forgotten after the Inquisition and its expulsion from Granada by the Catholic Monarchs." The museum intends to cover that historical void and the lack of knowledge about the Sephardic presence in the city.

=== Exposition ===
The museum combines elements which are part of its architectural structure with objects from private collections, mainly the Crespo López Family collection, donated to the museum and distributed between the two floors of the exhibition space, with pieces related to the Inquisition, converted Jews, religious symbols, and liturgical and ritual objects and festivities. Emphasis is placed on the importance of women within the Sephardic culture and on the most symbolic figures of the Jewish community, such as Samuel ibn Naghrillah, Moses ibn Ezra or Judah ibn Tibbon. The tour ends in a room dedicated entirely to the Water Synagogue in Úbeda (Jaén), with a recreation of its ritual bath (Mikveh).

In order to stress the relevance of the Inquisition in the day-to-day life of Granada's Jews, both themes share the same space. Gallows with views of the Alhambra, guillotines and "torture masks" are mixed in the Palace of the Forgotten with symbols of Sephardic culture, with sundials and astrophysical advances that recall the presence and persecution of the Jews and evidence the light and shadow of that period in Jewish and Spanish history.

==== Inquisition Museum ====
The Spanish Inquisition, established by the Catholic Monarchs in 1478 in order to "purify" Spain and impose Catholicism, lasted 350 years until it was abolished (de facto) in 1834.

The Palace of the Forgotten has on display more than 70 instruments of torture used by the European and Spanish court of the Inquisition. String music, "soft like the light flowing through its rooms", leads the visitors through the "path of terror", giving way, with a skeleton tied to a wheel and a sanbenito, to a repertoire of torture elements distributed across the two floors.

==== Interactive Flamenco Exhibition ====
The first floor hosts the Interactive Flamenco exhibition, designed to "create an experience which replicates the variety of sensations flamenco evokes". In this space, the visitor gets acquainted with Flamenco's past and present, rhythms, beats and types of voices. Designed for a "sensorial experimentation", its dances and influences are recreated in the form of a living museum – with the participation of the public and the support of interactive multimedia applications.

== See also ==
- History of the Jews in Spain
- Sephardic Museum (Granada)
- Sephardic Museum (Toledo)
- Spanish Inquisition
