= Garden of Sefarad =

The Garden of Sefarad (Spanish: Jardín de Sefarad) or the Jewish Cemetery of Ávila is a commemorative work of the discovery of a medieval Jewish cemetery in the city of Ávila, Spain. It was built on an old necropolis of the Jewish quarter, whose community buried their dead in this space between the 12th and 15th centuries. In October 2012, during the construction work of Collector Norte II in Ávila, 100 tombs were discovered. When starting the exhumation, the archaeologists discovered that the remains belonged to an old cemetery of a Jewish community (Kehilla), founded 1,000 years ago. The works were stopped, and the Ávila City Council collaborated with the Jewish Community of Madrid and the Federation of Jewish Communities of Spain. The architects of the project were Darío Álvarez Álvarez and Miguel Ángel de la Iglesia. Its construction was sponsored by the Ministry of Development and Environment and the City Council of Ávila. The budget was 61,000 euros, of which 50,000 were provided by the Ministry of Development and Environment, and 11,000 by the Ministry of Culture and Tourism. The Garden has been included into the Heritage and Development program (PADE). The Garden of Sefarad is part of the patrimonies of Ávila's and belongs to the Network of Jewish Quarters of Spain (Red de Juderías de España).

== Construction timeline ==
The construction works took place between 2012 and 2013.

September 2012: beginning of the construction work for a collector and discovery of 100 tombs. The Castellum Company is entrusted with the exhumation and investigation of the remains found in the necropolis.

October 2012: The Culture service of the Junta de Castilla y León and the Ávila City Council notified the Federation of Jewish Communities of Spain that they have found remains of Jewish cemetery dating back to the 12th and 15th centuries.

July 2013: the remains are re-buried. The municipal authorities collaborate with the Federation of Jewish Communities to re-bury the remains in the original cemetery in accordance with Jewish law and tradition (Hebrá Kadisha), and to seal the area. They officially recognize it as the old Jewish cemetery of Ávila. The burial is carried out by members of the Jewish Community of Madrid, in collaboration with a team of experts from the London headquarters of the Committee for the Preservation of Jewish Cemeteries in Europe.

== Features ==
The Garden covers 2000 m². It was built with earth and granite. It was designed in relation to the old city, in view of the walls. On the floor, granite lines visually link different points of the area with the most significant elements of Ávila. In the center there is a rectangular burial mound in which the remains from the excavated tombs were deposited. The rest of the garden evokes the old cemetery layout through granite slabs and stelae, emulating a quarry cut. The space is accompanied by two commemorative gazebos, large granite slabs, placed at the ends of the garden, to the north and west. Another series of granite slabs and stelae are arranged across the meadow, evoking the arrangement of the graves in the cemetery. At different points in the garden, including the two gazebos, the text “Ávila-Sefarad” appears in Hebrew.

On the north side, the Garden borders the Convent of the Incarnation.

The Garden of Sefarad is open 24 hours a day.
