= Sephardic Museum (Granada) =

Jewish museum in Granada, Spain

Coordinates: 37.1752°N 3.5949°W

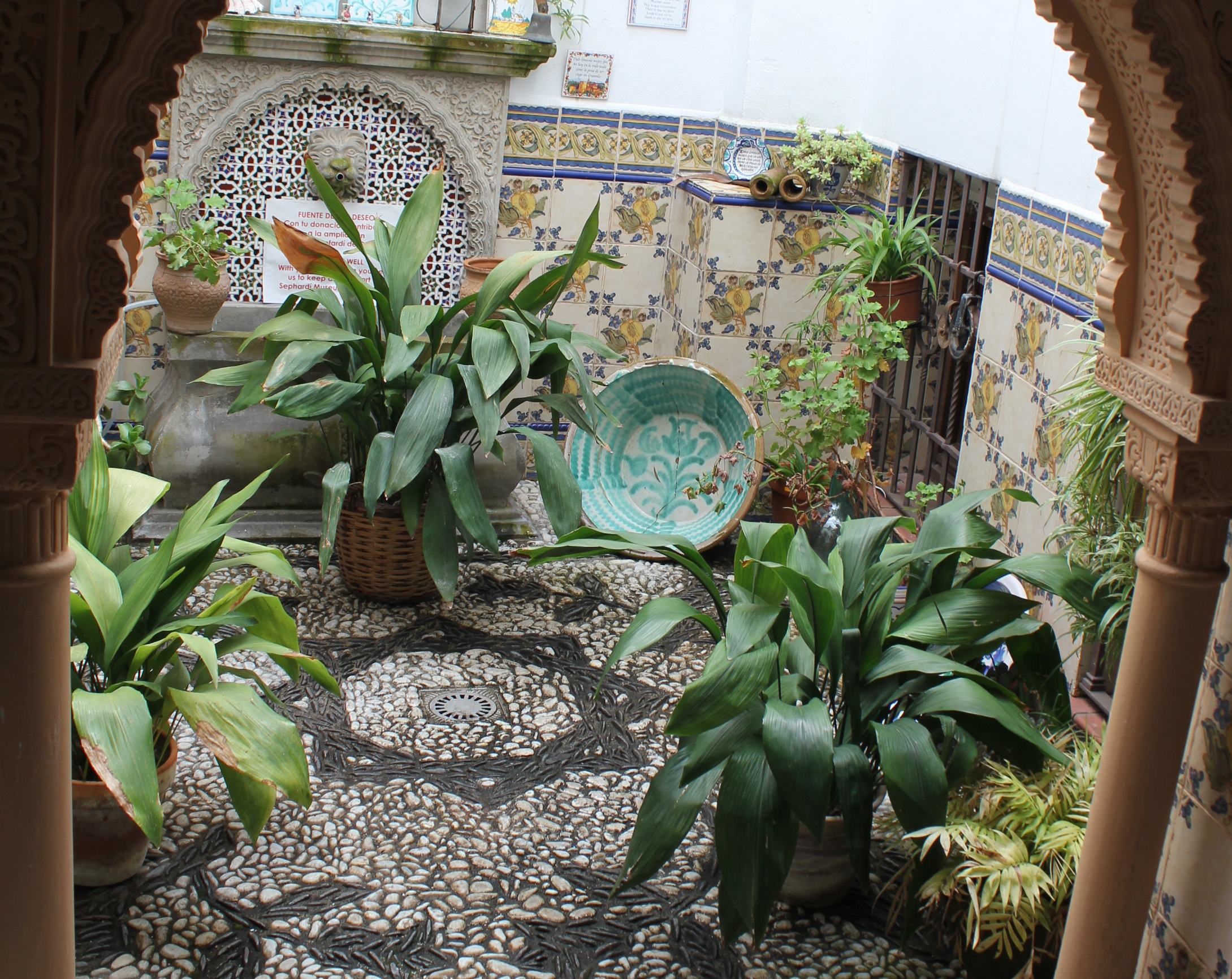
Courtyard of the Sephardic Museum

The Sephardic Museum in Granada, officially the Jewish Quarter Museum (Spanish: Museo de la Judería), is a small museum in the city of Granada, Spain, dedicated to the recreation of the culture, history, people and traditions of the Sephardic Jews of Jewish Granada. The museum, a private initiative, occupies a typical house in the Realejo – the Jewish quarter of Granada before the expulsion of the Jews in 1492.

== Historical context ==
Jews have been present in Granada for more than fifteen centuries, during which –and especially during the golden age of Andalusian Jews– they provided the city with many relevant figures, including scientists, writers, politicians and artisans, such as Samuel Ibn Naghrillah, who endowed the city with a system of public baths, or Judah ibn Tibbon, physician, translator, politician and poet.

The Realejo quarter is located in the Old city, southeast of the Alhambra, at the foot of the monumental complex. Its origins go back to the Jewish suburb of Muslim Granada, known by the name of Jewish Granada (Garnata (t) al-Yahud in Arabic).

== The museum ==
The Sephardic Museum of Granada first opened its doors in 2013, the year in which the Spanish government ruled to grant Spanish nationality to descendants of the Sephardi Jews expelled as a result of the Alhambra Decree, signed by the Catholic Monarchs in the very same hometown of this Jewish community.

The museum, an initiative of the Chevalier family (themselves descendants of the city's anusim), presents objects of day-to.day life, city maps and a Sephardic-themed library. The contributions to literature, science, gastronomy and history of this community to the city of Granada are explained through a "tour in miniature" of its places of worship, commerce and trades in the old Jewish quarter of the city. Highlights in the exhibition include a collection of objects of Jewish worship, a "ceramic kitchen" (complete kitchen equipped with ceramic objects) and a small Sephardic-style courtyard.

The museum also offers guided tours throughout the Realejo (Jewish quarter).

== See also ==
- History of the Jews in Spain
- Belmonte Jewish Museum
- Sephardic Museum, Toledo
- Red de Juderías de España
