= History of the Jews in Belmonte =

Crypto-Judaism
- Begins: 13th century
- Location: Belmonte
- Coordinates: Iberian Peninsula
- Country: Portugal

The history of the Jewish community in Belmonte, Portugal, dates back to the 13th century; the community was composed of Spanish and Portuguese Jews who kept their faith through crypto-Judaism.

The history of Belmonte's Jewish community is told at the Belmonte Jewish Museum, which opened in 2005.

In 2008, the Jewish population of Belmonte numbered around 300.

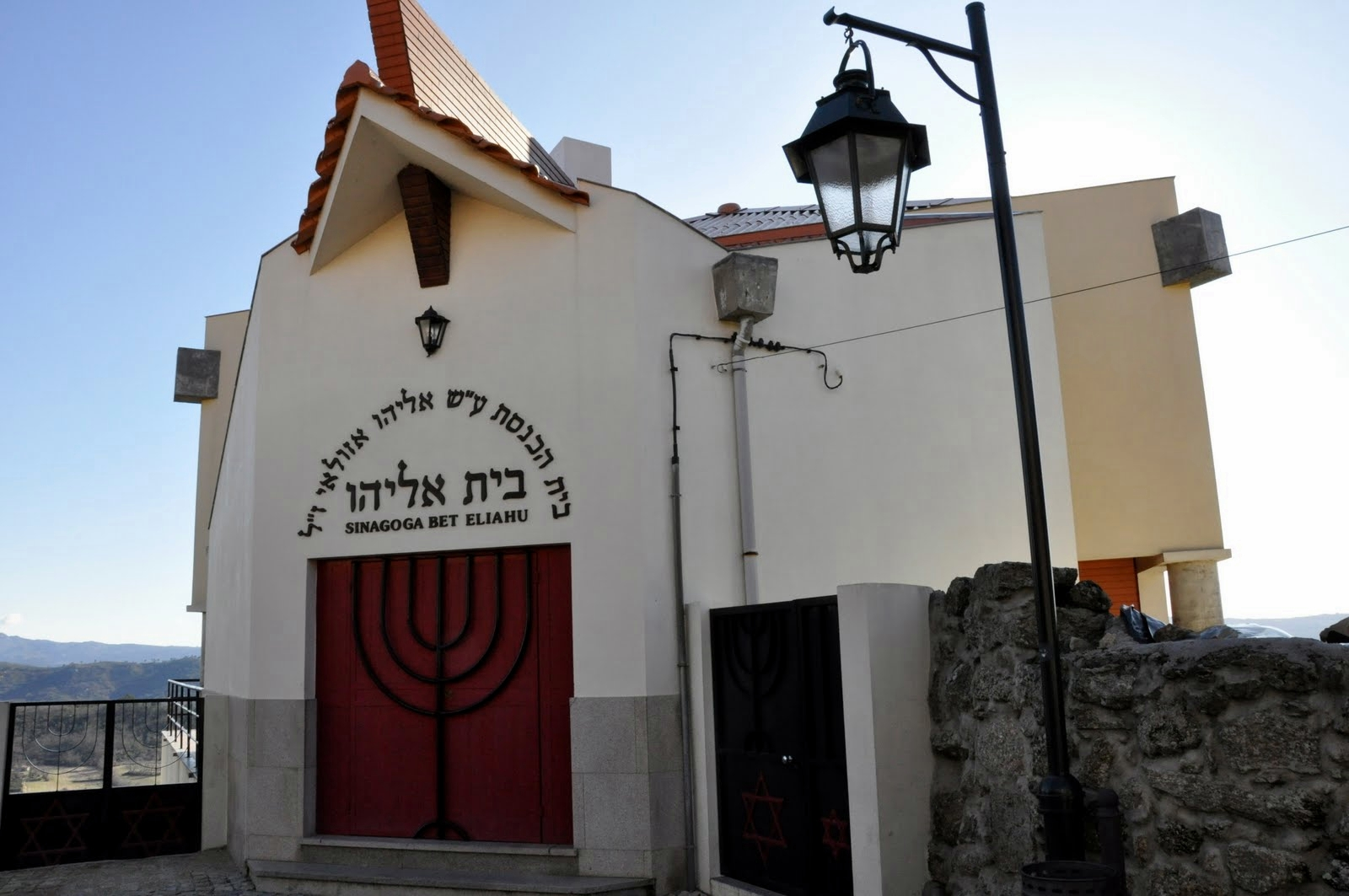
Bet Eliahu synagogue, inaugurated in 1996.

In 2024, a total of 40 Jews remained, only some of them permanent residents.

== The Inquisition and before ==
The earliest sign relic of the Belmonte Jewish community is an inscribed granite reliquary dating to 1297, from the town's first synagogue. Through the 15th and 16th century, there were a series of Inquisitions in Rome, Spain, and Portugal; the Spanish Inquisition of 1478 targeted conversos, Jews who had publicly renounced the Jewish faith and adopted Christianity, eventually expelling them in 1492, and thousands of Jews and conversos fled from Spain to Portugal. However, the Inquisition soon spread to Portugal, and they too began targeting conversos, and many worried about marranos, conversos only pretending to convert to Catholicism, but secretly continuing to practice Judaism and urging others to return to Judaism.

In 1497, King Manuel I ordered Portuguese Jews to either convert to Catholicism or to leave Portugal; many Jews, however, continued to practice Judaism, such as those in Belmonte. Due to the lack of written evidence of Belmonte's Jewish community before or after 1297 the continuous presence of crypto-Jews has been questioned. According to Antonieta Garcia, the wife of the former Mayor of Belmonte and who grew up as a Marrano, the existence of Inquisition dossiers against residents of Belmonte in the Court of Coimbra shows that the Jewish population did not disappear. Jews continued to hide their religious rites and practices even after the Inquisition officially ended in 1821.

== Schwarz's arrival ==
In 1914, a Jewish Polish mining engineer named Samuel Schwarz arrived in Portugal at the beginning of World War I. He and his wife moved to Lisbon, Portugal in search of work. He found a job at the tungsten and tin mines of Vilar Formoso and Belmonte. While in Belmonte, he discovered many Jewish symbols, such as a stele with Hebrew inscriptions, which he identified as belonging to an early synagogue. At the same time, he was warned by a Christian merchant not do business with a certain rival, claiming: "It is enough for me to tell you he is a Jew." He later met with this rival, Baltasar Pereira de Sousa, who confessed to him that he and his family were not only of Jewish descent, but were still secretly practicing Judaism. De Sousa went on to introduce Schwarz to the other marrano families of Belmonte, but to gain their trust, Schwarz had to prove he was a fellow Jew.

Schwarz studied the Jewish community of Belmonte for eight years and published his findings in 1925 in "The New Christians in Portugal in the Twentieth Century." He observed that they did not practice circumcision and kept Sabbath candles submerged in clay jars. They made sausages from chicken called Alheira and hung them in the windows to dry to avoid suspicion. In Portugal, it was a common practice to hang pork chouriços to dry. They had no rabbis, and religious ceremonies were conducted at home by the women of the family.

According to Garcia, Schwarz's arrival and the generally more lax atmosphere of Portugal at the time triggered a period of openness among the community, no longer as afraid to hide their faith. The revelation of the Belmonte Jewish community created significant shock waves in the worldwide Jewish community, some going so far as to launch efforts to "re-judaize" the marranos of Portugal, or reintegrate them into formal Orthodox Judaism. Three young men from Belmonte went to study in the yeshiva of Porto to become future teachers and rabbis; 1928, they were present at Passover services, and gave a number of Hebrew-language and religious basics lessons to some of the older members of the community.

== Under Salazar ==
António de Oliveira Salazar's rise to power caused the Portuguese Jewish community to retreat from public displays of their faith. However, many of Belmonte's crypto-Jews who had come out as Jewish continued to differentiate themselves from their Catholic neighbors, avoiding the performance of public Catholic ceremonies, and meticulously cleaning their houses on Friday. Garcia interviewed one woman from the community on this:

On the Jewish holidays, the men would go out into the street to avoid arousing suspicion. But it was up to us – the women who stayed inside the house – to take care of everything. We sang and we recited the prayers only after putting the young children to sleep. If they had heard us saying the prayers, they might have unintentionally repeated what they heard at home when out into the street. Only after they were mature... [for example when they began] to keep all the fasts, did we include them in our ceremony. Not only that: when we didn't come to church for mass, and other people bothered us because of that in school, we were trained to say that we had heard mass on the radio, or on television.

— Antonieta Garcia, The Presence of the Jews in Belmonte, 44-46

== Modern day ==
On 1974, April 25, the Carnation Revolution marked the end of the Salazar regime, leading to more openness in Portuguese society. Correspondingly, the Belmonte Jewish community began to open up more to the outside world. In 1987, a ceremony to welcome the Sabbath was held in the Municipal Auditorium with 63 people presenting, including a rabbi from the United States.

Belmonte's history of crypto-Judaism continues to generate interest. In November of 1987, the International Conference in Trancoso on the History of the Beiras and the Jews of the Iberian Peninsula was held, sponsored by the Association for Portuguese-Israeli Friendship, the Municipal Council of Transcoso, the Israeli Embassy in Portugal, the Civil Administration of Guarda, and also the Bureau of Archeology and History of Trancoso. The conference included lectures, exhibitions, films, guided tours of Belmonte's Jewish quarters, and other historical sites.

On January 19, 1998, a network of marrano families announced the holding of a meeting where the Jewish Association of Belmonte would be founded. Belmonte's members had spent years studying prior for the official establishment of Belmonte's kehilah, or a Halakhic Jewish community. On February 8, a list of the rights and responsibilities of community members were published:

1. To spread the Jewish religion among the members.
2. To spread the Jewish cultural tradition.
3. To encourage and motivate unity and mutual assistance among the Jews of Belmonte and in general among the Jews of Portugal.
4. To be involved, as an autonomous community, in the Jewish community of Lisbon, since it is the only body that represents the Jews of Portugal.
5. To inform the Jews of the entire world about the return of the crypto-Jews of Portugal to the bosom of Judaism.
6. To act toward cooperation with Jewish individuals and organization to achieve the aforementioned goals.

In 1990, Frédéric Brenner released his documentary about the Belmonte Jewish community called "The Last Marranos", drawing the first wave of tourists. In 1994, a representative from the converso community invited an Israeli rabbi to convert a group in Belmonte. A synagogue named Bet Eliahu was built and opened its doors in 1996.

In 2003, the Belmonte project was founded under the American Sephardi Federation in order to raise funds for acquiring Jewish education material and services for the community. A Jewish Museum of Belmonte opened on April 17, 2005; the museum underwent a renovation in 2016 and reopened in 2017. In 2006, the American Sephardi Federation no longer houses the Belmonte Project, as it considers Belmonte's tradition of crypto-Judaism unique. The Daily Telegraph included the Jewish museum of Belmonte as part of its list of top 50 small museums in Europe.

In 2019, the Jewish community of Belmonte completed an Eruv.

== See also ==
- Auto-da-fé
- History of the Jews in Portugal
- Belmonte Jewish Museum
- Portuguese Inquisition
- Sephardi Jews
- Spanish and Portuguese Jews
