= Samuel Schwarz (historian) =

Engineer and historian

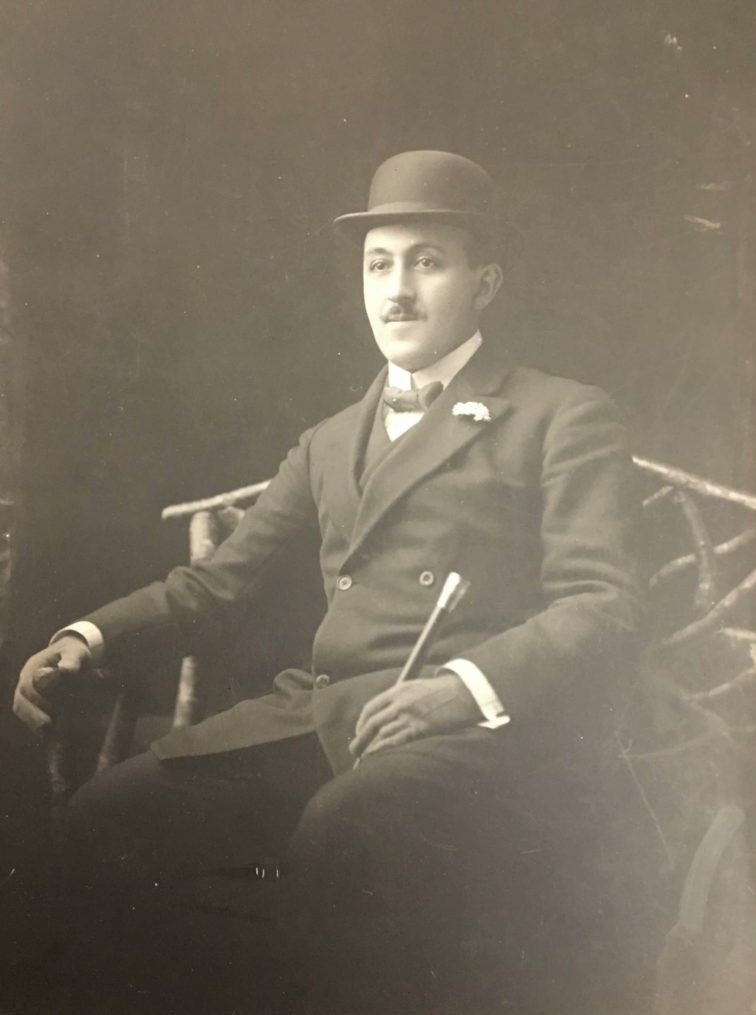
- Born: Samuel Szwarc (Note: Szwarc is the Polish spelling of the German-derived surname Schwarz. Samuel's parents and most of his siblings went by Szwarc, while all of his published works and every source used in this article render his surname as Schwarz.); 12 February 1880; Zgierz, Congress Poland
- Died: 10 June 1953 (aged 73); Lisbon, Portugal
- Occupations: Mining engineer; historian; archaeologist; writer
- Known for: Rediscovery of the Jews of Belmonte; restoration of the Synagogue of Tomar
- Spouse: Agatha Barbasch (married 1914)
- Relatives: Marek Szwarc (brother); Tereska Torrès (niece)

Samuel Schwarz (12 February 1880 – 10 June 1953), or Samuel Szwarc, was a Polish-Portuguese Jewish mining engineer, archaeologist, and historian of the Jewish diaspora, specifically of the Sephardic and crypto-Jewish communities of Portugal and Spain. He is known for his rediscovery of the Jews of Belmonte, Portugal, and restoration of the Synagogue of Tomar.

== Life and work ==
=== Early life ===
Samuel Szwarc was born in Zgierz, Poland, on 12 February 1880, the first of ten eventual sons. His youngest brother was Polish-French painter and sculptor Marek Szwarc. Their father Isucher Moshe Szwarc (1859–1939) was an Orthodox Jew heavily involved in Zgierz's Jewish community and the late Haskalah movement. In Zgierz Isucher was known for his bibliophilia and owned an extensive library. He was also a fervent Zionist, participating in the First Zionist Congress and subsequent congresses.

Samuel studied at a cheder and a Jewish high school in his youth. His father considered sending Samuel to the Hildesheimer Rabbinical Seminary in Berlin, but ultimately sent him to study in Paris in 1896 when he was 16 years old. From 1896 to 1897 Samuel studied at the École nationale des arts décoratifs, eventually transferring to the École nationale supérieure des mines de Paris in 1898.

Szwarc graduated from the École nationale supérieure des mines in 1904. Between 1904 and 1914 he worked as a mining engineer throughout Europe and Africa, including in the Baku oilfields in Azerbaijan; coal mines in Sosnowiec, Poland, and England; tin mines of the Arnoya Mining Company in the Ourense and Pontevedra provinces of Spain from 1907 to 1910 and again in 1912; and at a gold mine of the Monte Rosa Gold Mining Company in Alagna Valsesia, Italy, in 1911. Szwarc was a notable polyglot, speaking Russian, Polish, German, English, French, Italian, Spanish, Portuguese, Hebrew, and Yiddish, likely assisting him in his frequent work travels.

In 1913 Samuel attended the Eleventh World Zionist Congress in Vienna with his father. While there he met Agatha Barbasch, daughter of Russian banker and militant Zionist Samuel Barbasch. They married in April 1914 in Odessa and honeymooned throughout Europe. When World War I broke out, making work in Western Europe impossible, Samuel and his wife decided to move to Lisbon, Portugal, as he had heard positive things about the country during his stint in Spain. They arrived in Portugal in 1915, and Samuel began working at the tungsten and tin mines of Vilar Formoso and Belmonte, respectively. He quickly became involved in Lisbon's expatriate Jewish community. Samuel was also an early documentarian in his new country, photographing and filming important events and locations throughout Portugal.

On 14 February 1915 Agatha gave birth to the couple's only child, their daughter Clara Schwarz, in Lisbon.

=== Foray into Jewish diaspora studies ===
Schwarz became interested in Iberian crypto-Judaism and the Marranos during his time in Spain, where he learned about the crypto-Jewish Xuetes of Mallorca. Between 1907 and 1910 he published some articles about Marranos in the journal of the Royal Galician Academy—of which he became a member—and in the magazine España-Nueva. In 1908 and 1909 he published similar articles in French.

In 1917 Schwarz's professional work as a mining engineer and his interest in crypto-Judaism led him to Belmonte in Portugal's northern Trás-os-Montes region. At the time the First Portuguese Republic enjoyed relative intellectual freedom, especially when compared to its successor the corporatist, semi-fascist Estado Novo regime. In Belmonte he discovered steles bearing legible Hebrew inscriptions, which he deduced belonged to an old synagogue. While in Belmonte Schwarz also met Baltasar Pereira de Sousa, supposedly when someone warned Schwarz not to do business with Sousa because, "It is enough for me to tell you, he is a Jew." His curiosity piqued, Schwarz visited Sousa, who admitted his family and neighbors had practiced Judaism in secret for generations.

Sousa introduced Schwarz to the larger Marrano community in Belmonte. Though the Jews of Belmonte were initially skeptical of Schwarz given their secrecy, he eventually gained their trust when he recited the Shema Yisrael prayer and uttered the name of God (Adonai), which they recognized. In the succeeding years Schwarz further befriended and studied Belmonte's Jewish community, documenting their unique social and religious customs and transcribing their prayers and family manuscripts.

In 1923 he began his second career as an archaeologist, ethnographer, and historian in earnest with the publication of his work "Inscrições hebraicas em Portugal" ("Hebrew inscriptions in Portugal") in the magazine Arqueologia e História ("Archaeology and History"), which he published under the name Samuel Schwarz.

Schwarz's research in Belmonte and surrounding areas led to his 1925 book Os cristãos novos em Portugal no século XX (The New Christians in Portugal in the 20th Century), likely the first written work about the Marrano community of northern Portugal and bringing that community to worldwide attention, and since 1925 posthumously republished in Portuguese, Hebrew, and French. Seeing his studies of the Marranos as important to the wider Jewish community, Schwarz also published various articles in British, Spanish, French, Polish, and Italian magazines and newspapers regarding the matter. The book was well received by Jews worldwide and by crypto-Jews in northern Portugal, leading to a renaissance of Portuguese Jewishness.

=== The Synagogue of Tomar and World War II ===
On 5 May 1923, Schwarz purchased a small building in Tomar that Portuguese archaeologists had rediscovered in 1920 as the Synagogue of Tomar, a pre-expulsion synagogue. He undertook archaeological excavations and restoration work of the synagogue, proposing the building become the Portuguese Jewish Museum of Tomar (Museu Luso-Hebraico de Tomar). Schwarz donated the building on 27 July 1939 to the Portuguese government on the condition it be turned into a museum. In return Schwarz and his wife Agatha were granted Portuguese citizenship, protecting them and their daughter Clara during the Holocaust. Since 1939 the building has functioned as the Abraham Zacuto Portuguese Jewish Museum (Museu Luso-Hebraico Abraão Zacuto).

Though Samuel, Agatha, and Clara remained safe in Portugal during the Holocaust and World War II, they lost relatives on both the Szwarc and Barbasch sides of the family. Samuel's then-octogenarian father Isucher was killed in 1939 when anti-Semites invaded and burned the family home and library in Zgierz. One of Samuel's siblings and a nephew died at an extermination camp. Samuel tried without success to get some relatives to live in Portugal: the Portuguese government denied his requests to allow them to settle, though they transited through Lisbon en route to London in June 1940. The surviving Szwarcs settled in various places, including Israel, after the war.

=== Later life ===
Samuel founded the Polish Chamber of Commerce in Portugal (Câmara de Comércio Polaca em Portugal) in 1930, serving as its president for some time. In that capacity he traveled to Funchal, Madeira, to welcome the Polish training ship ORP Iskra on 18 March 1932. He was also a member of the Portuguese Order of Engineers and the Association of Portuguese Archaeologists (Associação dos Arqueólogos Portugueses), the latter since 1921.

Schwarz published various books and articles on Jewish themes in Portuguese throughout the 1930s, 1940s, and 1950s. Notable works include the books Cântico dos Cânticos (1942), Anti-semitismo with Leon Litwinski (1944), A Tomada de Lisboa segundo um documento coevo da Biblioteca Nacional (1953), A Sinagoga de Alfama (1953), and the posthumous História da Moderna Comunidade Israelita de Lisboa (1959), as well as a 1946 series of articles published in the magazine Ver e Crer (Seeing and Believing), which included the articles "O Sionismo no reinado de D. João III" ("Zionism during the reign of King João III"), "Origem do nome e da lenda do Preste João da Índia" ("Origin of the name and legend of Prester John of India"), and "Quem eram os emissários que D. João II mandou em busca do Preste João?" ("Who were the emissaries King João II sent in search of Prester John?"). He also remained involved in mining engineering, in 1936 writing a brochure for the Portuguese Directorate of Mines titled Arqueologia mineira: extrato dum relatório acerca de pesquisas de ouro (Mining archaeology: an extract regarding searches for gold).

Later in life Schwarz suffered from ill health, ultimately preventing him from visiting his surviving brothers, nieces, nephews, and other relatives who had settled in Israel and elsewhere.

== Death and legacy ==
Schwarz died in Lisbon on 10 June 1953, shortly after his wife Agatha's death.

After his death Schwarz's library of mainly Judaism-related books—including 32 incunabula and 10,000 other rare books—was sold to the Portuguese government. Though intended to stay in Tomar, the collection found its way to the Portuguese Ministry of Finance's Historic Archive, where it sat in storage for decades. Currently the collection is held at the Mário Sottomayor Cardia Library of Social Sciences at the Universidade Nova de Lisboa, where it is being inventoried and cataloged as the Biblioteca Samuel Schwarz (Samuel Schwarz Library).

Schwarz's 1925 book Os cristãos novos em Portugal no século XX (The New Christians in Portugal in the 20th Century) has been republished posthumously four times: twice in Portuguese; once in Hebrew in 2005; and once in French in 2015. There are plans to translate it into English by 2021.

In January 2008 the Belmonte Jewish Museum dedicated a gallery in Schwarz's honor. In 2019 the municipality of Belmonte named one of the town's squares after and erected a bust of Schwarz in honor of his contributions to the town and its Jewish community.

== Published works ==
- Inscrições hebraicas em Portugal (Hebrew inscriptions in Portugal). 1923.
- Os cristãos novos em Portugal no século XX (The New Christians in Portugal in the 20th Century). 1925.
- Arqueologia mineira: extrato dum relatório acerca de pesquisas de ouro (Mining archaeology: an extract regarding searches for gold). 1936.
- Projecto de organização de um Museu Luso-Hebraico na antiga sinagoga de Tomar (Project of the organization of a Portuguese-Jewish Museum at the old synagogue of Tomar). 1939.
- Cântico dos cânticos / Salomão (Canticle of canticles / Solomon). 1942.
- Anti-semitismo (Anti-semitism), with Leon Litwinski. 1944.
- A tomada de Lisboa: conforme documento coevo de um códice hebraico da Biblioteca Nacional (The Siege of Lisbon). 1953.
- A sinagoga de Alfama: in memoriam do eminente olisipógrafo engenheiro Augusto Vieira da Silva (The synagogue of Alfama: in memoriam of the eminent Lisbon-ographer engineer Augusto Vieira da Silva). 1953.
- Histórias da moderna Comunidade Israelita de Lisboa (Stories of the modern Jewish Community of Lisbon). 1959, posthumous.
- La Découverte des marranes (The Discovery of the Marranos). Paris: Editions Chandeigne. ISBN 978-2-367321-19-6. 2015, posthumous.
