= Híjar =

Town in Aragon, Spain

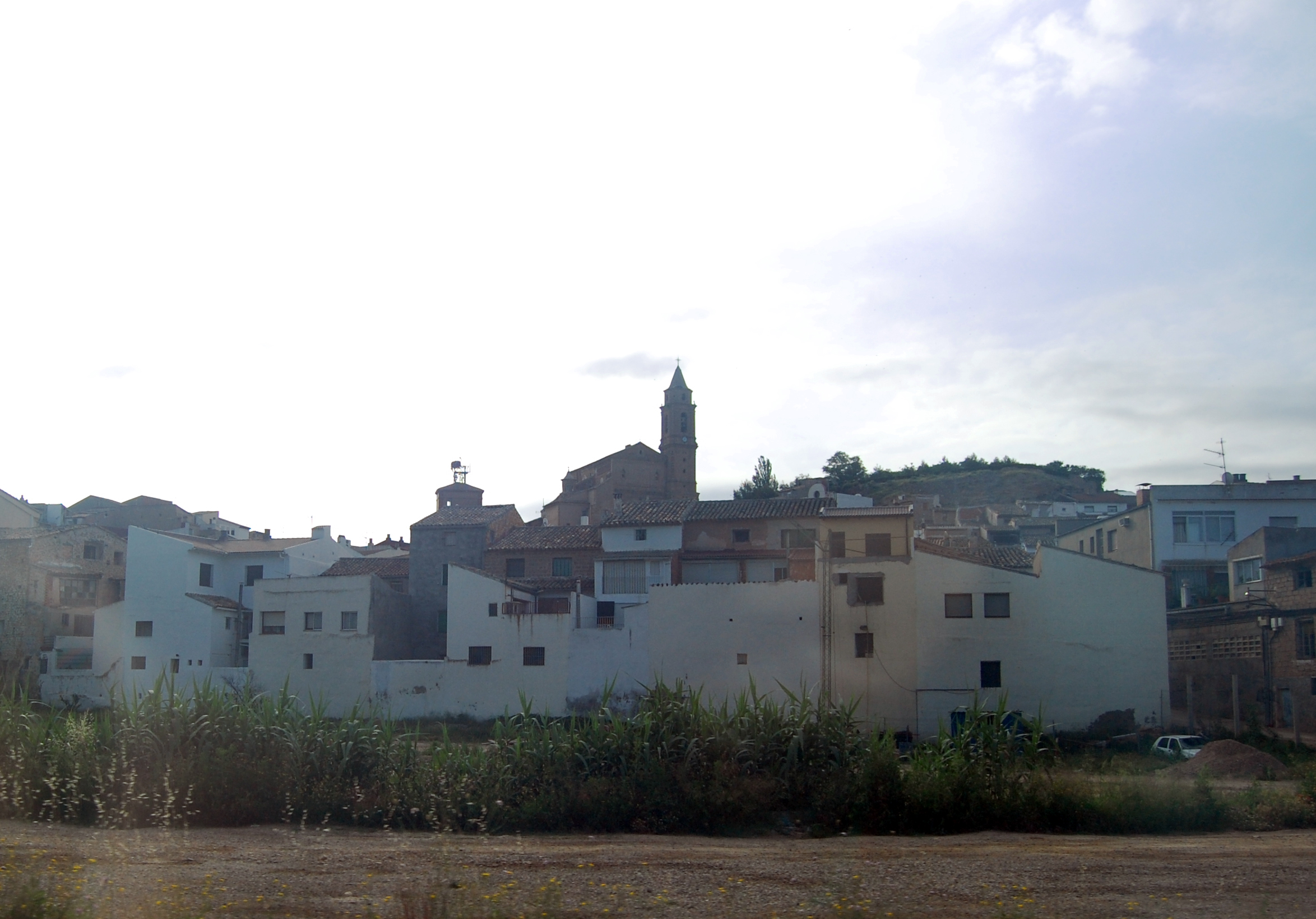

- Coat of arms

- Location in Aragon Location in Spain
- Coordinates: 41°10′28.50″N 0°26′59.11″W
- Country: Spain
- Autonomous community: Aragon
- Province: Teruel
- Comarca: Bajo Martín

Government
  - Mayor: Jesús Puyol Adell (Popular Party)

Area
  - Total: 165.36 km^{2} (63.85 sq mi)
- Elevation: 291 m (955 ft)

Population (2023)
  - Total: 1,797
  - Density: 10.87/km^{2} (28.15/sq mi)
- Time zone: UTC+1 (CET)
  - Summer (DST): UTC+2 (CEST)
- Website: Official website

Híjar is a municipality located in the province of Teruel, Aragon, Spain. In 2023 the municipality had a population of 1,797 inhabitants.

The town is noted for the well-preserved, 15th century Synagogue, and for the Gothic-Mudejar church of Santa María la Mayor.

== Twin towns ==
- Tobarra, Spain

== See also ==
- List of municipalities in Teruel
