= Híjar Synagogue =

Historic former synagogue and former church, in Híjar, Spain

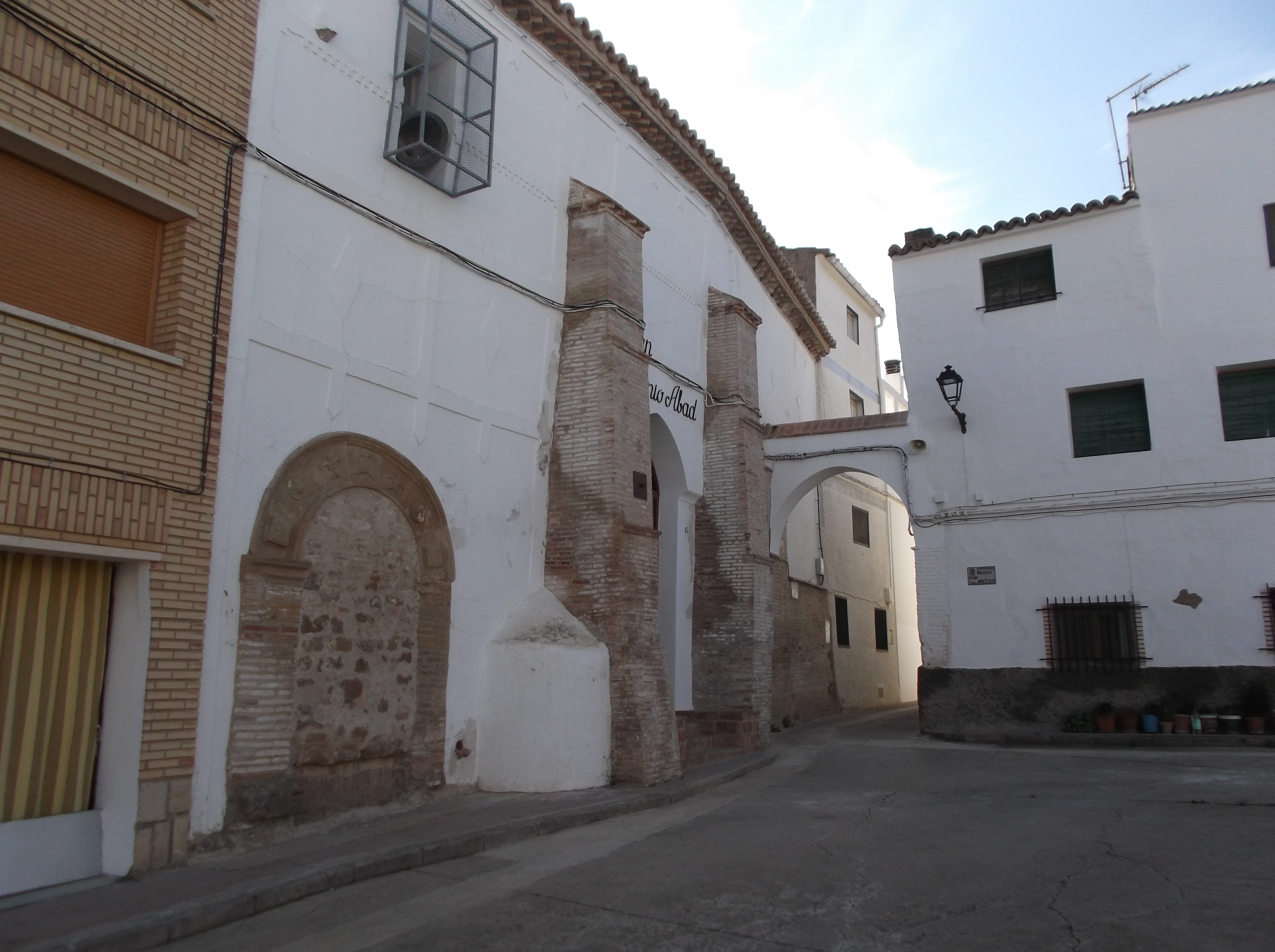
- The former synagogue and former church, in 2021

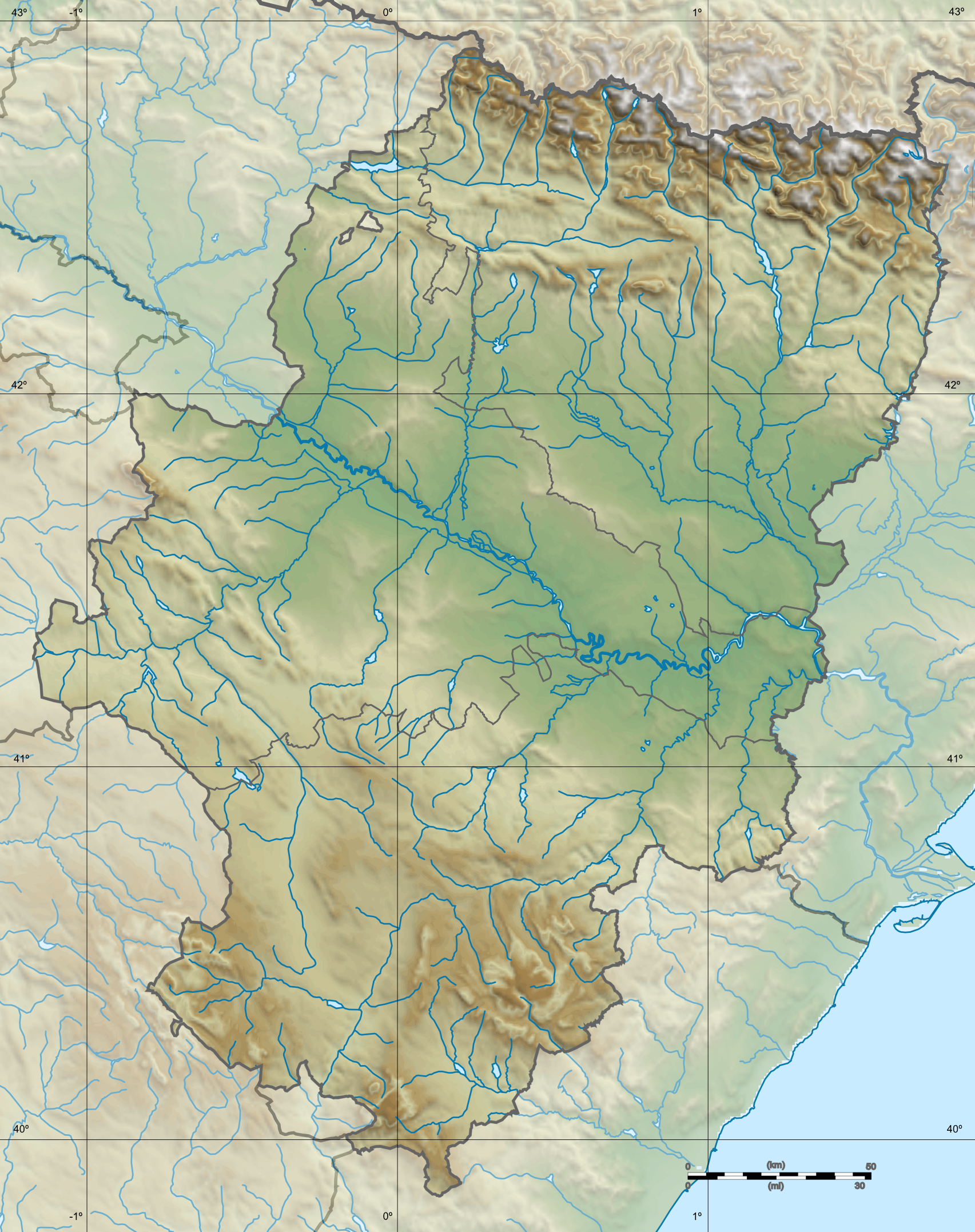
- Location of the former synagogue and former church, in Aragon

Religion
- Affiliation: Judaism (former); Roman Catholicism (former)
- Rite: Nusach Sefard
- Ecclesiastical or organisational status: Synagogue (15th century); Church (1492–2024)
- Ownership: Municipality of Hijar
- Status: Abandoned (as a synagogue); Repurposed

Location
- Location: San Antón Square, Híjar, Teruel, Aragon
- Country: Spain
- Coordinates: 41°10′36″N 0°27′05″W

Architecture
- Type: Synagogue architecture
- Completed: 15th century
- Materials: Stone

The Híjar Synagogue, also known as St. Anthony’s Synagogue, is a former Jewish congregation and synagogue, located in San Antón Square, Híjar, in the province of Teruel, Aragon, Spain. The building was used as a synagogue during the 15th century; as a Catholic church from 1492 until 2024; and, in 2024, plans were announced to restore the building as a synagogue.

== History ==
Since the expulsion of the Jews from Spain it has been in use as the Church of San Antón in Híjar. The Jewish community in Híjar is known to have numbered 32 families as late 1481, after a series of pogroms and partial expulsions. Before the expulsion in 1492, the Jewish community of Híjar was noted for craftsmen expert in parchment-making and bookbinding. Híjar was also an early center for Hebrew printing.

The building is one of the best-preserved synagogue buildings on the Iberian Peninsula, after the synagogues of Toledo, Córdoba and Tomar.

== See also ==
- History of the Jews in Spain
- List of synagogues in Spain
