= Synagogue of Tomar =

Former synagogue, now museum, in Tomar, Portugal

- Portuguese: Sinagoga de Tomar
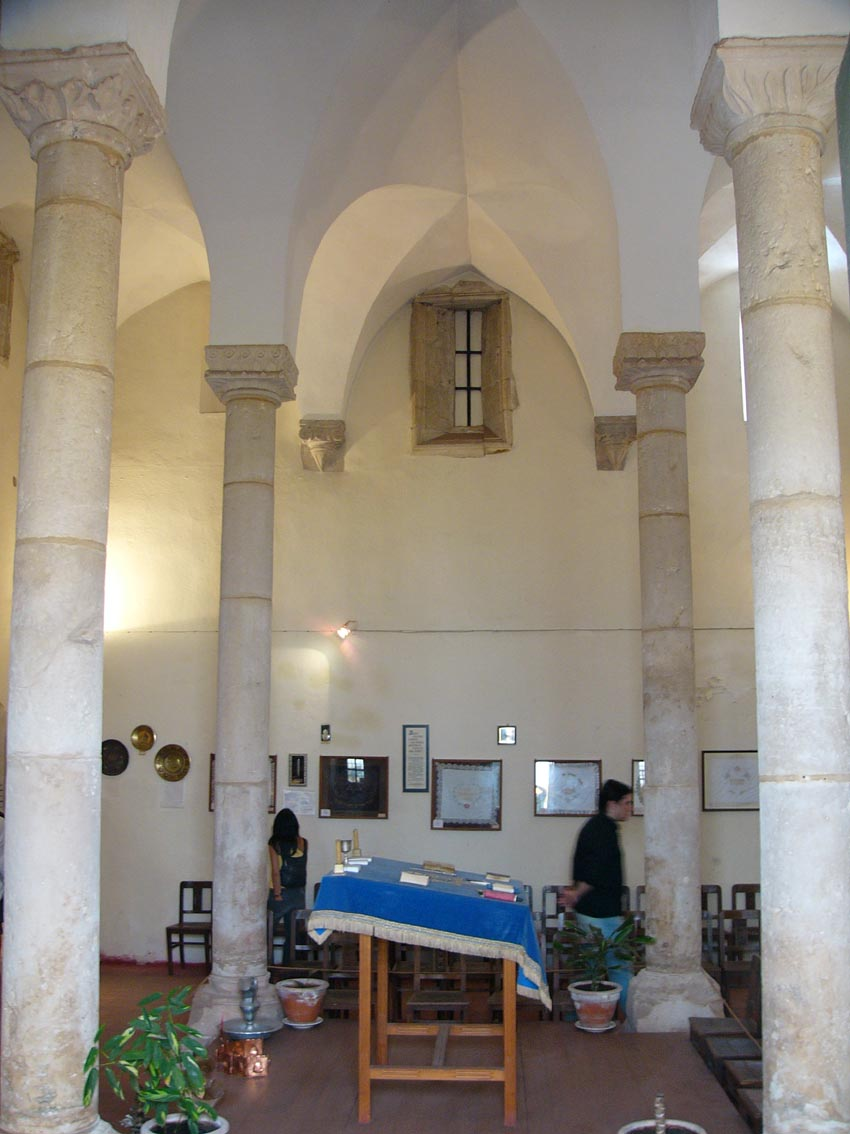
- Interior of the former synagogue in 2004

- Location of the former synagogue, now museum, in Portugal

Religion
- Affiliation: Judaism (former)
- Rite: Nusach Sefard
- Ecclesiastical or organizational status: Synagogue (c. 1460–1498); Profane use (1515–1920s); Jewish museum (since 1939)
- Status: Abandoned; Repurposed

Location
- Location: 73 Rua Dr. Joaquim Jaquinto, Tomar, Santarém District
- Country: Portugal
- Interactive map of Synagogue of Tomar
- Coordinates: 39°36′11.6″N 8°24′49.9″W

Architecture
- Architect: Samuel Schwarz (1939)
- Type: Synagogue architecture
- Style: Gothic
- Established: 14th century (as a congregation)
- Completed: c. 1460; 1939 (restoration)

Specifications
- Direction of façade: East
- Interior area: 9.5 by 8.25 metres (31.2 by 27.1 ft)
- Materials: Stone

Website
- cm-tomar.pt (in Portuguese and English)

Portuguese National Monument
- Designated: 29 July 1921

The Synagogue of Tomar (Portuguese: Sinagoga de Tomar) is a former Jewish congregation and synagogue, located at 73 Rua Dr. Joaquim Jaquinto, in the historic center of the city of Tomar, in the Santarém District of Portugal. The medieval synagogue was completed in the Gothic style by c. 1460, and was active as a synagogue until 1496, when Jews were expelled from Portugal.

After four centuries of profane use, the building was declared a Portuguese National Monument, restored, and repurposed in 1939 as the Abraham Zacuto Portuguese Jewish Museum (Portuguese: Museu Luso-Hebraico Abraão Zacuto), a Jewish museum named in honour of Abraham Zacuto.

== History ==
The Synagogue of Tomar was built between 1430 and 1460 by the city's then thriving Jewish community. Tomar's Jewish community traced its origins to the 14th century, when some individuals came to work for the Knights Templar and their successors in the Military Order of Christ. By mid-century when the synagogue was built, Tomar's Jewish community numbered between 150 and 200 individuals—30% to 40% of Tomar's total population at the time—and the city center had a Jewish quarter. The community grew even larger when Spanish Jews settled in Tomar after Spain expelled them in 1492.

The synagogue's congregation was openly active only until 1496, when King Manuel I of Portugal ordered the forced conversion or expulsion of Portuguese Jews. The building may have been abandoned until 1516, when a private individual purchased it intending to convert it to Tomar's prison. The building probably served as a prison from 1516 until the 1550s.

At the end of the 16th century or beginning of the 17th century, the former synagogue became a Catholic chapel called the Ermida de São Bartolomeu (Hermitage of Saint Bartholomew), serving in this capacity until the 19th century. From the 19th century until 1920—when Portuguese archaeologists first visited the building—it functioned as a hay barn and then as a wine and grocery warehouse.

On 29 July 1921 the Portuguese government classified the building a national monument. On 5 May 1923 then owner of the building Joaquim Cardoso Tavares sold it to the Polish Jewish engineer and scholar Samuel Schwarz, who restored the building and conducted the first excavations. Schwarz donated the building on 27 July 1939 to the Portuguese government on the condition it be turned into a museum. In return Schwarz and his wife were granted Portuguese citizenship, protecting them during the Holocaust. Since 1939 the building has functioned as the Abraham Zacuto Portuguese Jewish Museum. The museum's collection includes several medieval tombstones from Jewish cemeteries throughout Portugal. Two notable exhibits include a stone plate from the Lisbon Synagogue, dated 1307 and bearing a greeting inscription, and a 13th-century inscription from Belmonte on which the Divine Name is represented by three dots in a manner reminiscent of the Dead Sea Scrolls.

The Synagogue of Tomar is one of two existing preserved medieval synagogues in Portugal. The other is the Synagogue of Castelo de Vide. Four pre-expulsion synagogue buildings exist in neighboring Spain: Híjar Synagogue, the Synagogue of Santa María la Blanca and Synagogue of El Tránsito in Toledo, and Córdoba Synagogue. All other existing Portuguese synagogues were built after the Portuguese Inquisition ended in 1821.

== Architecture ==
The building's whitewashed exterior mimics the architecture of neighboring houses, such that apart from the current Star of David and informational signage, it is not immediately recognizable as a synagogue or other religious building. The current north-facing, rectangular main entrance did not exist in the Middle Ages. The Gothic pointed arch facing east — toward Jerusalem — used to be the main entrance. Inside, the synagogue is a 9.5-metre (31 ft) by 8.25-metre (27.1 ft) rectangular hall with three short naves divided by four columns supporting Gothic vaulting. The vaults engage into the exterior walls, ending in carved brackets. The column capitals bear geometric and vegetal motifs. The four columns are thought to symbolize the four matriarchs—Sarah, Rebecca, Leah, and Rachel—while the twelve brackets represent the Twelve Tribes of Israel.

Excavations in a building beside the synagogue in 1985 revealed remnants of a mikveh.

== Gallery ==
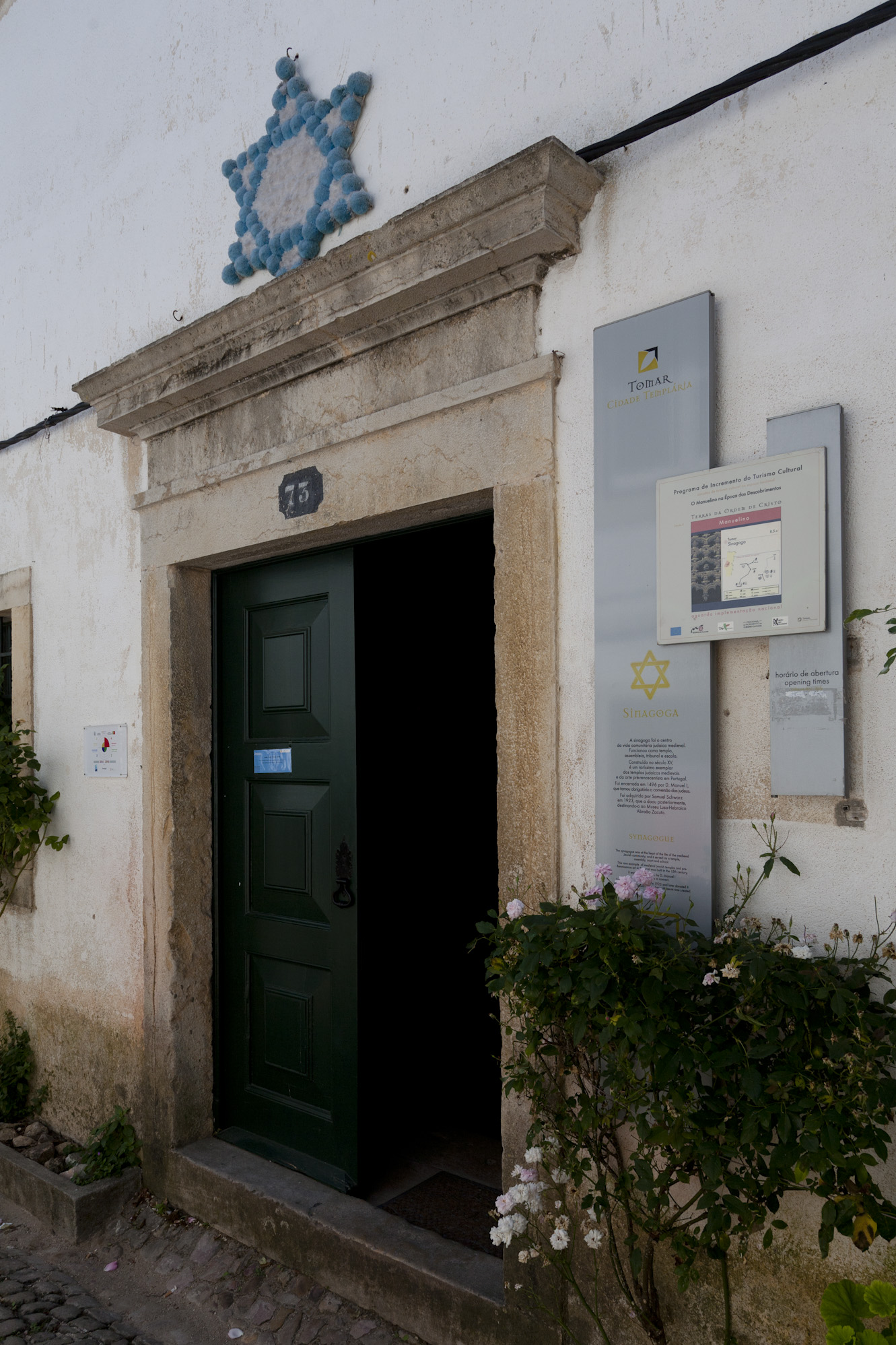
Current main entrance

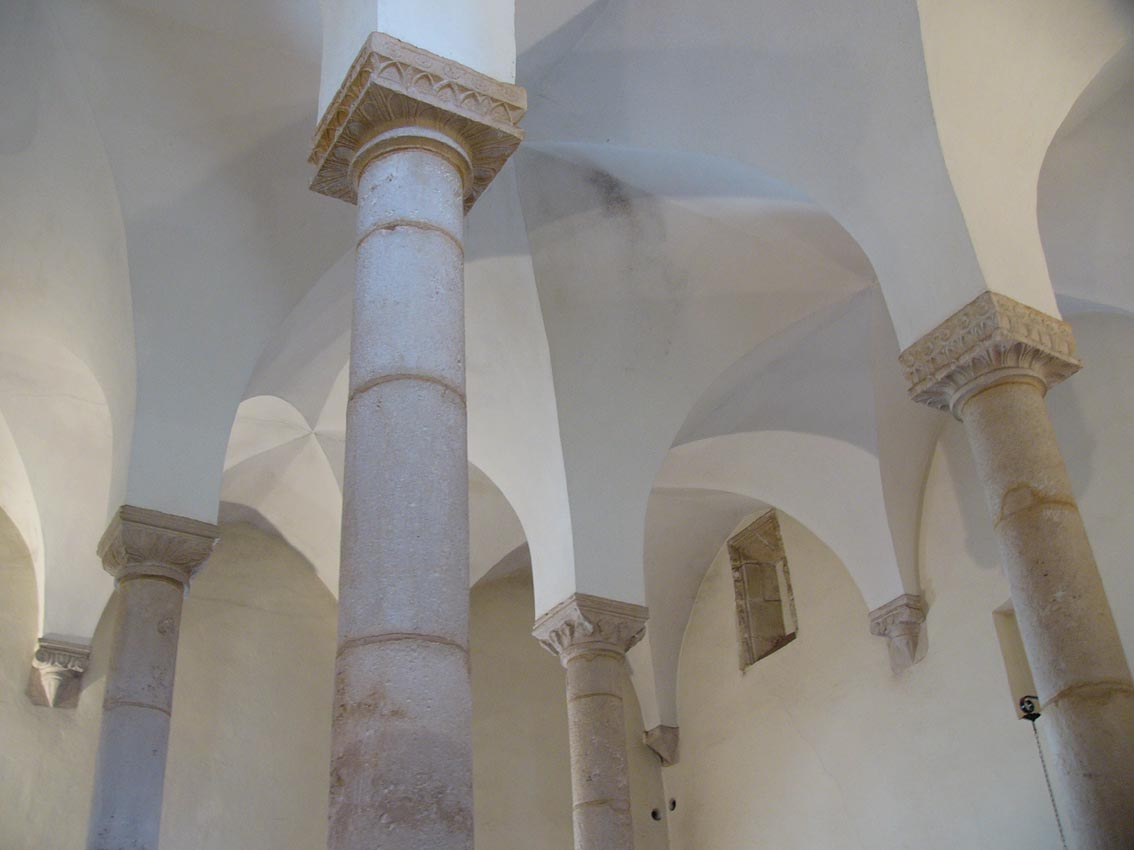
Interior of the Tomar Synagogue showing the pillars and vaulting

== See also ==
- History of the Jews in Portugal
- List of synagogues in Portugal
