= Lorenzo Mediano =

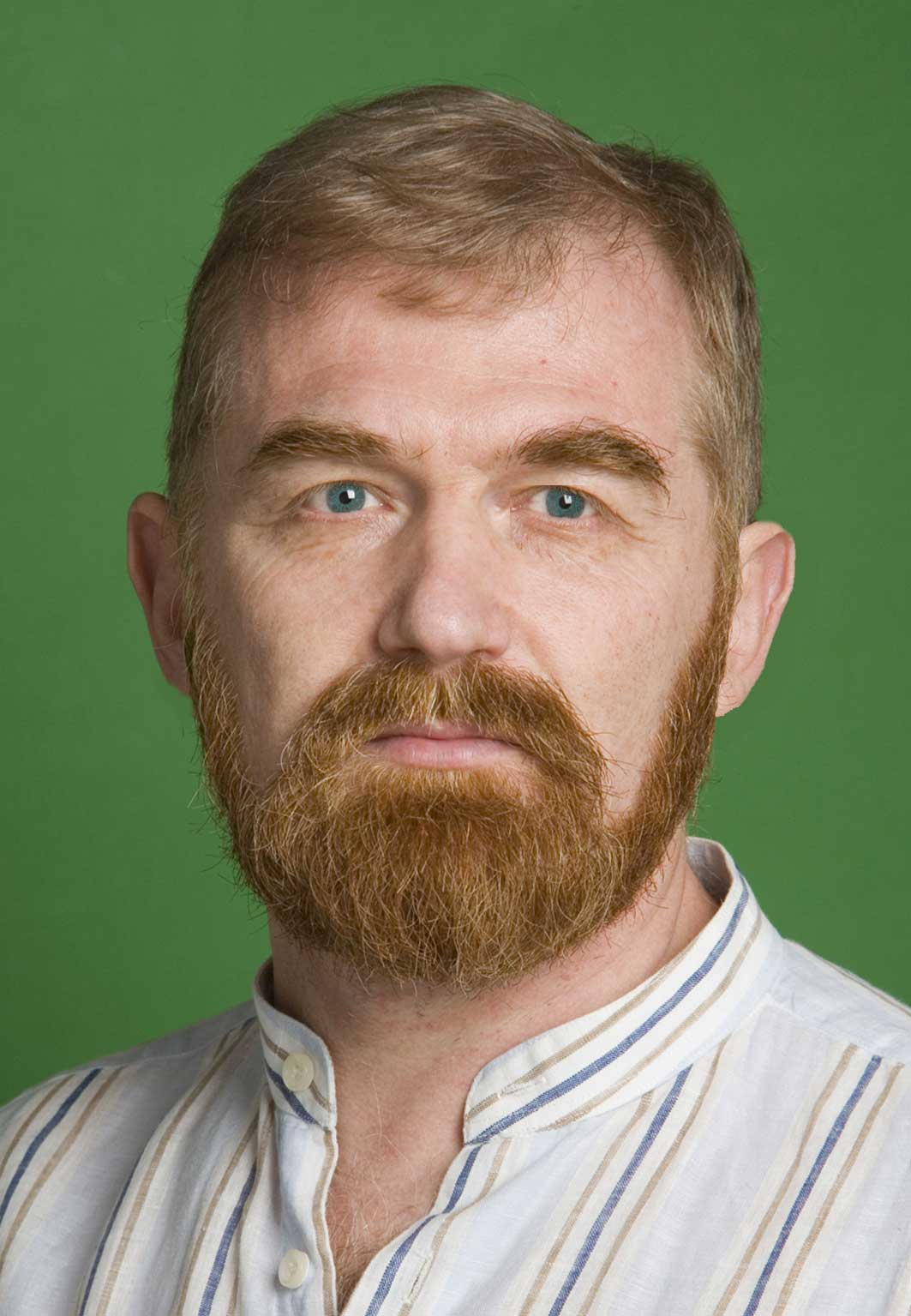
Lorenzo Mediano. Lorenzo Mediano, Zaragoza

Lorenzo Mediano (born 1959, Zaragoza) is a Spanish physician, writer and wilderness survival instructor. He is the author of several novels such as Los olvidados de Filipinas, La escarcha sobre los hombros, El Secreto de la Diosa and Tras la huella del hombre rojo.

== Works ==
- Vivir en el campo (1988), RBA LIBROS, S.A. (ISBN 84-85351-74-6) (ISBN 84-7901-165-3)
- La escarcha sobre los hombros (1998), Onagro Ediciones. (ISBN 84-88962-12-6)
- Cuentos de amor imposible (2002), Onagro Ediciones. (ISBN 84-88962-24-X)
- Los olvidados de Filipinas (2005), Onagro Ediciones. (ISBN 84-88962-29-0)
- El secreto de la diosa (2003), Grijalbo. (ISBN 84-253-3769-0)
- El secreto de la diosa (2003), Círculo de Lectores, S.A. (ISBN 84-672-0294-7)
- El secreto de la diosa (2004), Nuevas Ediciones de Bolsillo. (ISBN 84-9793-267-6)
- El secreto de la diosa (2005), RBA Coleccionables, S.A. (ISBN 84-473-3526-7)
- Tras la huella del hombre rojo (2005), Grijalbo. (ISBN 84-253-3969-3)
- Donde duermen las aguas (2006), Onagro Ediciones. (ISBN 84-88962-50-9)
- El espíritu del trigo (2007), Grijalbo.
- El siglo de las mujeres (2009), Onagro Ediciones.
- El escriba del barro (2010), Grijalbo.
- El desembarco de Alah (2013), Tropo Editores
