= Belmonte Jewish Museum =

Jewish museum in Belmonte, Portugal

Coordinates: 40.358°N 7.350°W

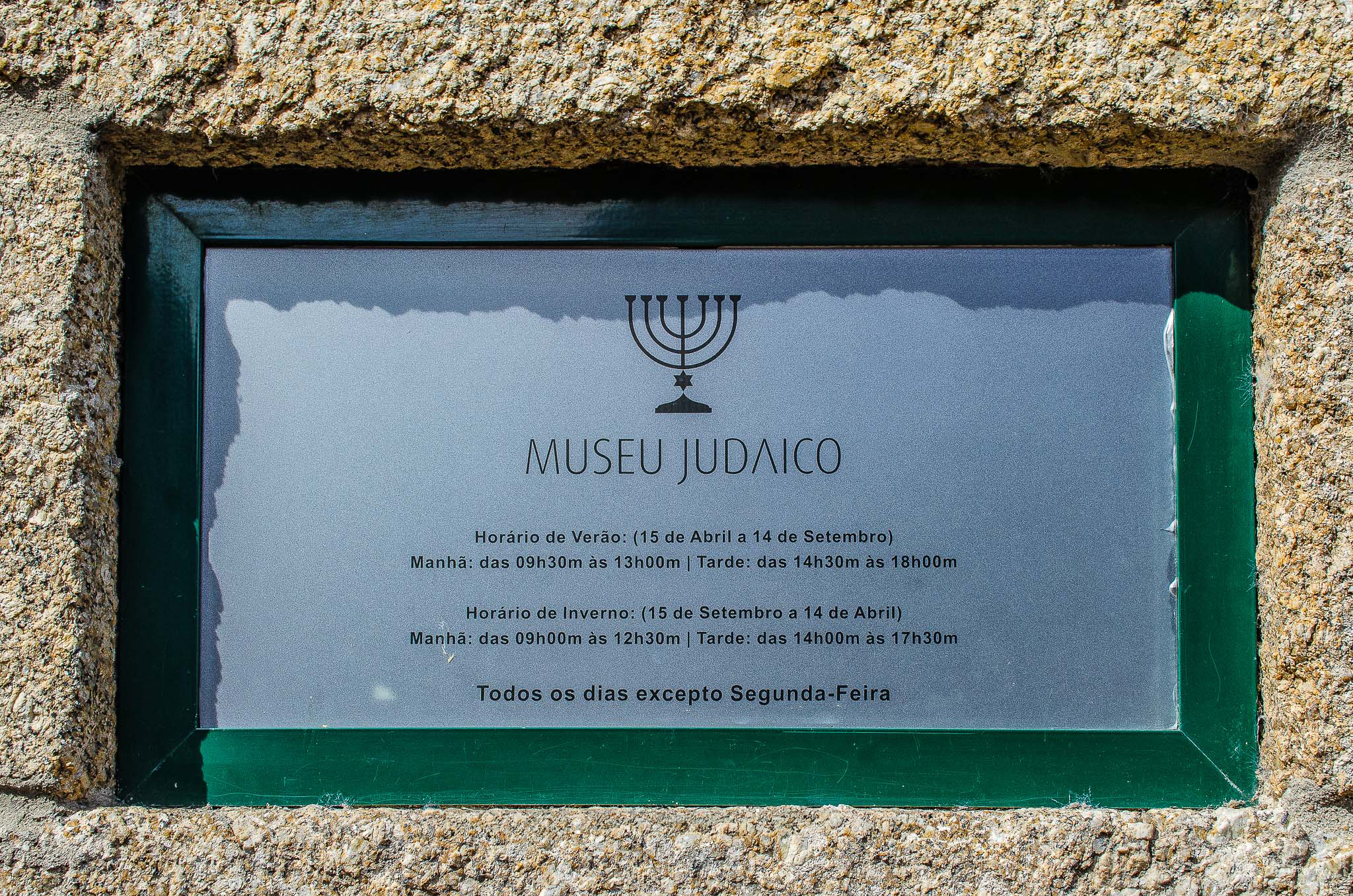
- Plaque at the entrance of the museum
- Interactive fullscreen map
- Established: 2005
- Location: Belmonte, Portugal
- Type: Art and history
- Website: www.cm-belmonte.pt/diretorio/museu-judaico/

The Belmonte Jewish Museum (Portuguese: Museu Judaico de Belmonte), is a museum in Belmonte, Portugal, which depicts the long history of the Jewish community in the village, which survived many centuries of religious persecution. It is the first museum of its kind in Portugal, located in the last stronghold of the crypto-Jewish community established there around the 15th century.

The museum displays over a hundred religious, everyday, and professional use items used by Jewish families, especially Beira Interior and Trás-os-Montes. The museum attracts over 30,000 visitors a year and is considered one of the best of its kind throughout the Iberian Peninsula. British newspaper The Telegraph included the museum in its list of the 50 best small museums in Europe.

== History ==
The museum was inaugurated on April 17, 2005, by the then Minister of Parliamentary Affairs, Augusto Santos Silva.

In August 2017 the museum reopened after undergoing a renovation project costing 350,000 USD, also introducing interactive exhibitions. António Dias Rocha, the mayor of Belmonte, stated to the Lusa news agency that the renovated museum is expected to become a significant center for Sephardic culture, aiming to explain the Jewish community's long history in Belmonte and attract 100,000 visitors annually.

In 2023 the Jewish Museum was the most frequented museum in Belmonte, attracting both local and international visitors, notably from Israel, Brazil, the US, and Spain.

== See also ==
- Crypto-Judaism
- New Christian
- Marrano
- Samuel Schwarz
