= Red de Juderías de España =

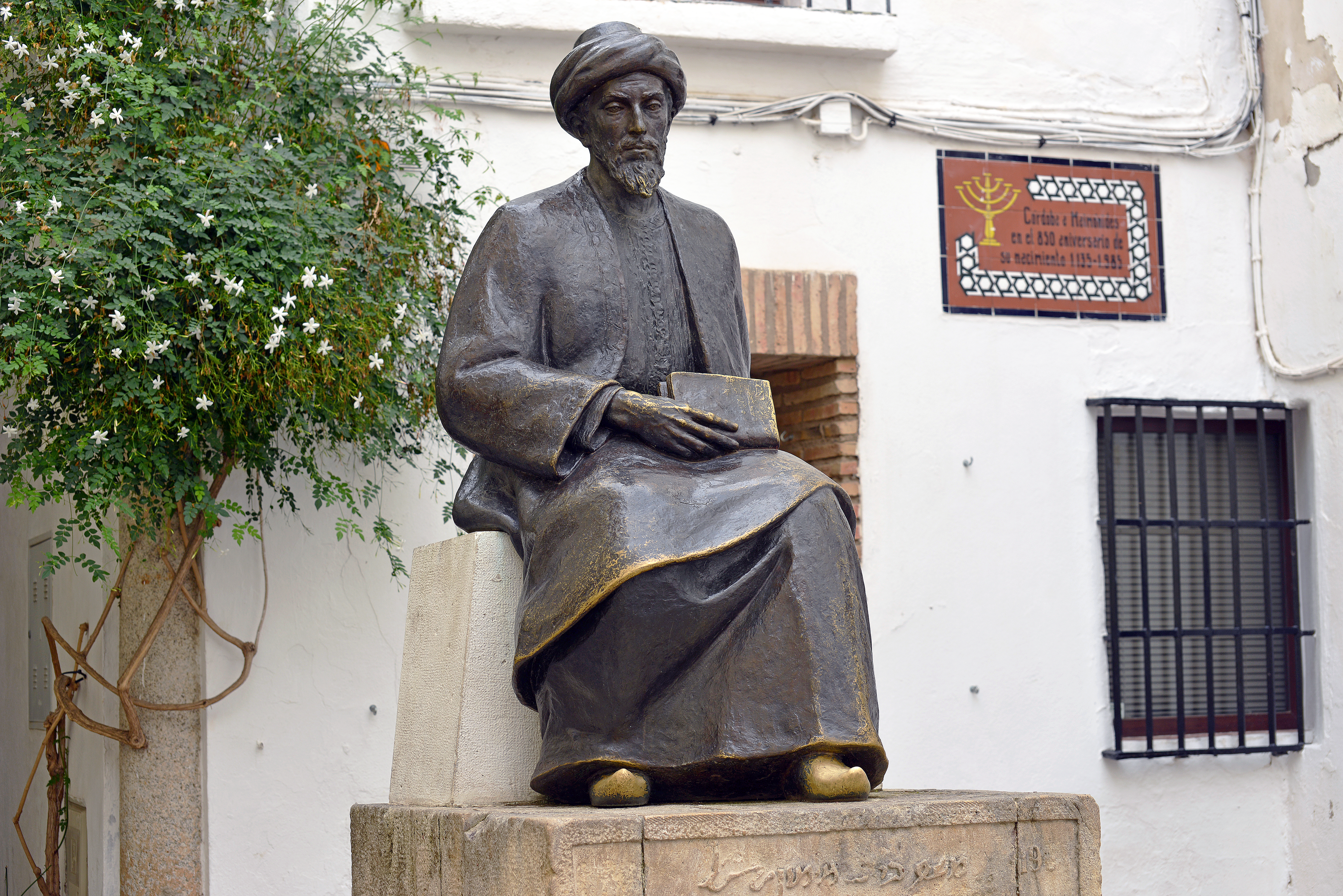
Statue of Maimonides in the Jewish quarter of Córdoba, member and seat of the network

The Red de Juderías de España (literally "Network of Jewish Quarters of Spain") is a non-profit organisation comprising cities which have a medieval Jewish quarter. Its goals are to preserve the architectural, historical, artistic and cultural legacy of the Sephardi Jews, who were expelled from Spain in 1492. Since October 2016, the organisation is permanently headquartered in Córdoba, while its presidency rotates annually between mayors of member cities.

== History ==
The organisation was founded in 1995 and its founding members were Cáceres, Córdoba, Girona, Hervás, Ribadavia, Segovia, Toledo and Tudela. Tortosa and Oviedo joined before the end of the century. Barcelona and León joined in 2003, alongside Ávila and Jaén two years later. In 2008 there was a significant expansion, with Besalú, Calahorra, Estella-Lizarra, Monforte de Lemos Plasencia and Tarazona joining. Lucena became the 24th member in 2012, having first applied in 2003.

In June 2016, the Catalan members Besalú, Castelló d'Empúries, Girona and Tortosa quit the organisation. These cities – where Jewish quarters are known as calls from a Hebrew term – saw the organisation as focused on tourism, while they considered education and research to be more important. The split made headlines in The New York Times and Israel's Haaretz.

Seville, a member since 2011, also left in 2016. Mayor Juan Espadas saw membership as not financially viable. Palma de Mallorca ended its 12-year membership in 2017 in order to put the €22,500 fee towards promoting its Jewish history independently. Oviedo's membership ended in 2020 due to a €54,000 debt.

Béjar, Lorca, Sagunto and Tui joined in 2019.
