= Pont-de-l'Isère =

Pont-de-l'Isère Lo Pònt d'Isèra (Occitan)
- Commune
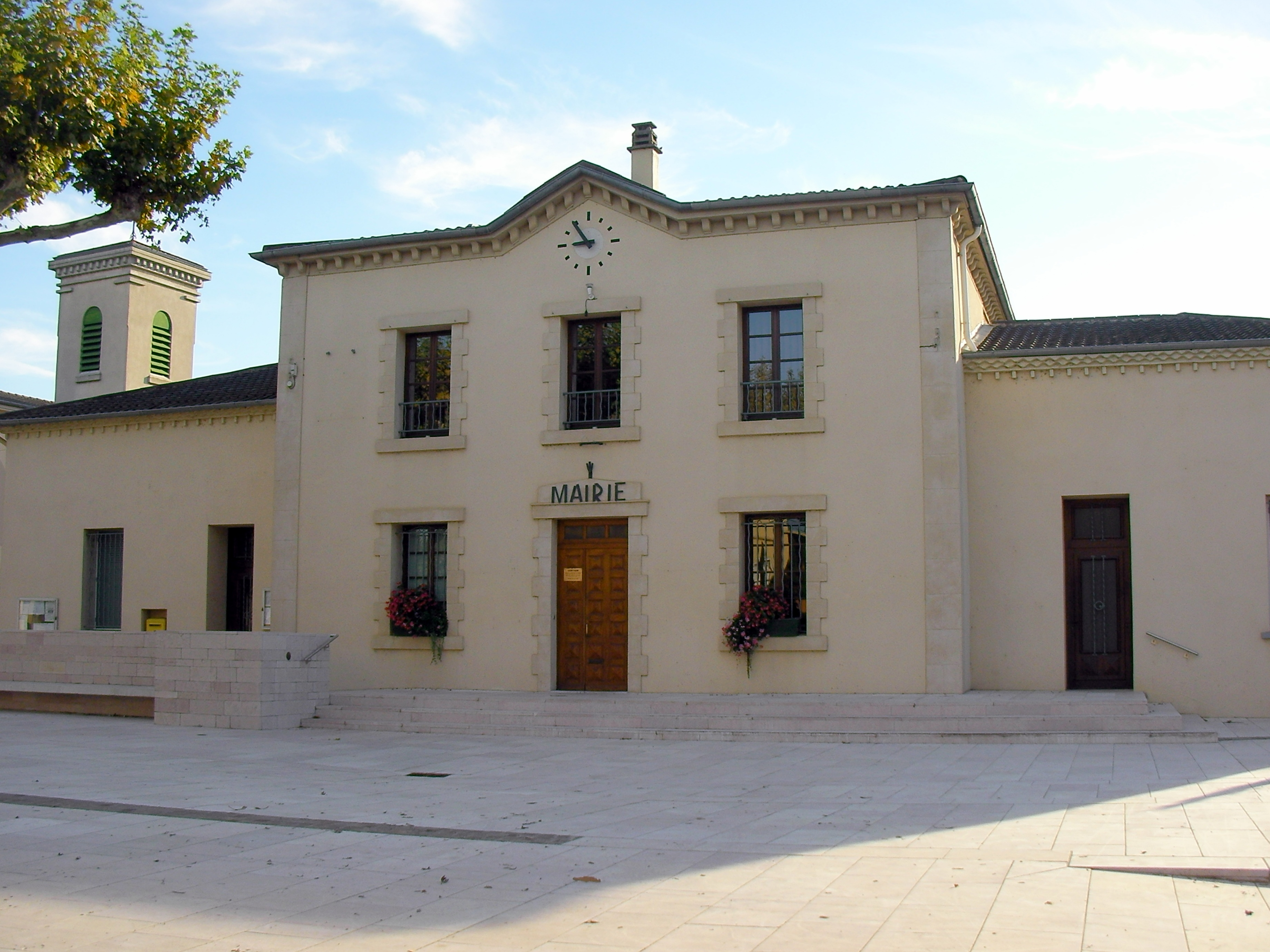
- Town hall

- Coat of arms
- Location of Pont-de-l'Isère
- Location within France Location within Auvergne-Rhône-Alpes
- Coordinates: 45°00′20″N 4°52′03″E
- Country: France
- Region: Auvergne-Rhône-Alpes
- Department: Drôme
- Arrondissement: Valence
- Canton: Tain-l'Hermitage
- Intercommunality: CA Arche Agglo

Government
  - Mayor (2020–2026): Marie-Claude Lambert
- Area^{1}: 10.09 km^{2} (3.90 sq mi)
- Elevation: 119 m (390 ft)
- Highest elevation: 146 m (479 ft)
- Lowest elevation: 110 m (360 ft)
- Population (2023): 3,681
  - Density: 364.8/km^{2} (944.9/sq mi)
- Time zone: UTC+01:00 (CET)
  - Summer (DST): UTC+02:00 (CEST)
- INSEE/Postal code: 26250 /26600
- ^{1} French Land Register data, which excludes lakes, ponds, glaciers > 1 km^{2} (0.386 sq mi or 247 acres) and river estuaries.

Pont-de-l'Isère (French pronunciation: [pɔ̃ də lizɛʁ]; lit. 'Bridge of the Isère'; Occitan: Lo Pònt d'Isèra) is a French commune, located in the Drôme department in the Auvergne-Rhône-Alpes region. This town really emerged in 1866 when it was separated from La Roche-de-Glun. Its name comes from the bridge which crosses the Isère to the south of the town, built in 1822 after the old wooden bridge burned down in 1814.

== Geography ==
Pont-de-l'Isère is best known for the fact that it is located on the 45th parallel north. The commune is located 9 km south of Tain-l'Hermitage (seat of the canton) and 9 km north of Valence. Towns that are the closest are La Roche-de-Glun and Beaumont-Monteux.

== Population ==
Historical population
Year	Pop.	±% p.a.
1968	1,135	—
1975	1,304	+2.00%
1982	2,477	+9.60%
1990	2,770	+1.41%
1999	2,688	−0.33%
2007	2,622	−0.31%
2012	3,048	+3.06%
2017	3,503	+2.82%
2023	3,681	+0.83%
Source: INSEE

== Twin towns ==
Pont-de-l'Isère is twinned with:

- Ziano Piacentino, Italy

== See also ==
- Communes of the Drôme department
