= Mauves =

- Commune
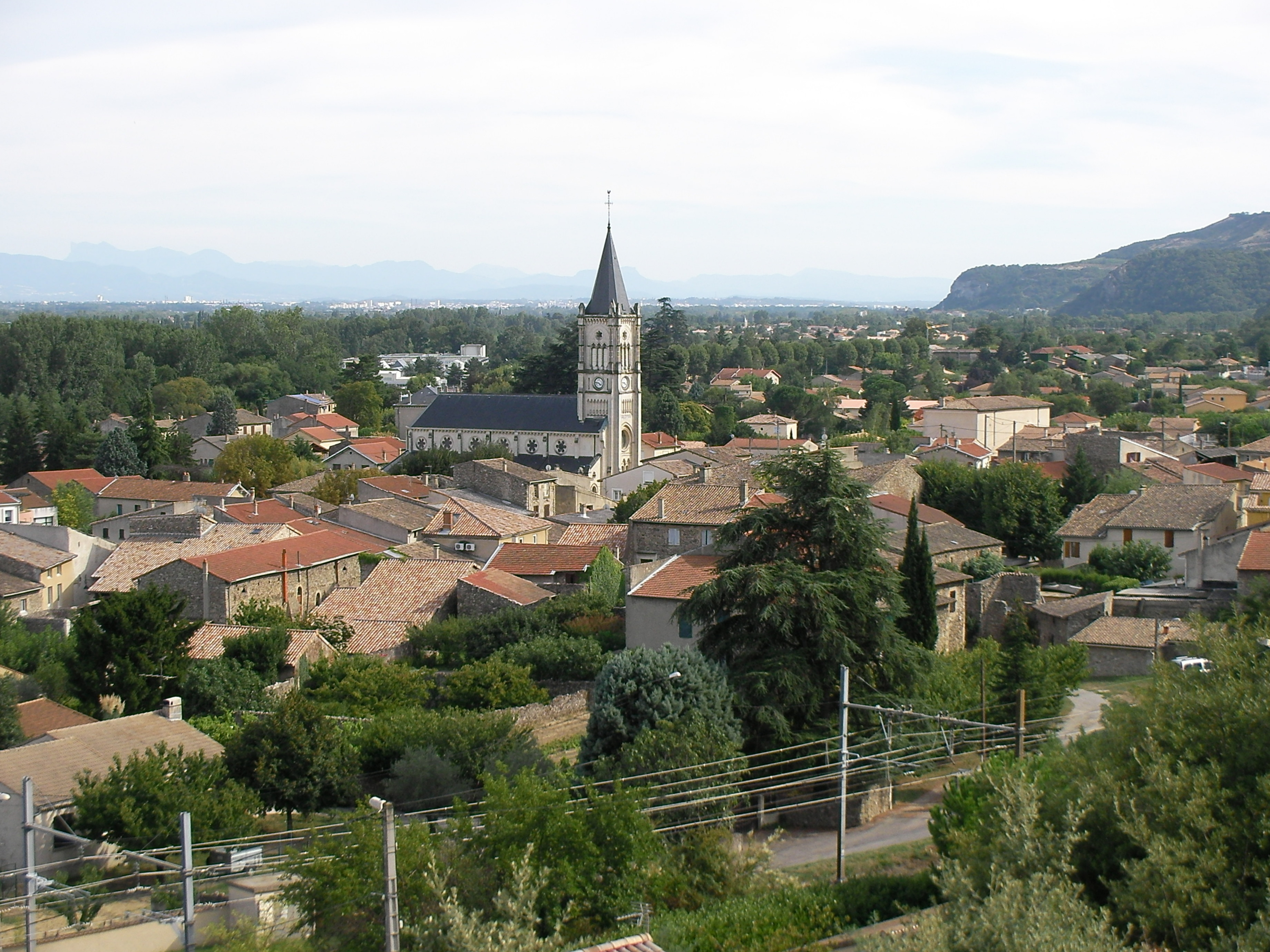
- The church and surrounding buildings in Mauves
- Location of Mauves
- Location within France Location within Auvergne-Rhône-Alpes
- Coordinates: 45°02′21″N 4°49′48″E
- Country: France
- Region: Auvergne-Rhône-Alpes
- Department: Ardèche
- Arrondissement: Tournon-sur-Rhône
- Canton: Tournon-sur-Rhône
- Intercommunality: CA Arche Agglo

Government
  - Mayor (2020–2026): Jean-Paul Bulinge
- Area^{1}: 7.05 km^{2} (2.72 sq mi)
- Elevation: 123 m (404 ft)
- Highest elevation: 432 m (1,417 ft)
- Lowest elevation: 113 m (371 ft)
- Population (2023): 1,210
  - Density: 172/km^{2} (445/sq mi)
- Time zone: UTC+01:00 (CET)
  - Summer (DST): UTC+02:00 (CEST)
- INSEE/Postal code: 07152 /07300
- ^{1} French Land Register data, which excludes lakes, ponds, glaciers > 1 km^{2} (0.386 sq mi or 247 acres) and river estuaries.

Mauves (French pronunciation: [mov]; Occitan: Violet) is a commune in the Ardèche department in southern France. It is about 10 km north of Valence and 75 km south of Lyon.

== Geography ==
The commune of Mauves is located on the right (western) bank of the Rhône, a few kilometers south of Tournon-sur-Rhône, sub-prefecture of Ardèche and capital of the canton; and about fifteen kilometers north of Valence, prefecture of Drôme.

=== Bordering Municipalities ===
Mauves is bordered by Plats to the West, Tournon-sur-Rhône to the North, La Roche-de-Glun to the East and Glun to the South.

== Town planning ==
=== Typology ===
According to the terminology defined by INSEE and the zoning published in 2020, Mauves is an urban municipality. It actually belongs to the urban unit of Tournon-sur-Rhône, an inter-departmental agglomeration comprising 8 different municipalities and 30,213 inhabitants in 2017.

In addition, the municipality is part of the attraction area of Valence, of which it is a municipality in the crown. This area, which includes 71 municipalities, is categorized in areas with a population of between 200,000 and 700,000 inhabitants.

== History ==
Some people wish to situate the battle of 121 BC between the Arverni led by Bituitos and two Roman armies commanded by the consul Gnaeus Domitius Ahenobarbus and Fabius Maximus Allobrogicus in Mauves. The location of this battle is actually on the other bank of the Rhône. Historians most often locate it near the crossroads of the Seven Paths and in the plain of Mercurol (Drôme).

== Population ==
Historical population
Year	Pop.	±% p.a.
1968	663	—
1975	756	+1.89%
1982	923	+2.89%
1990	1,027	+1.34%
1999	1,094	+0.70%
2007	1,129	+0.39%
2012	1,179	+0.87%
2017	1,177	−0.03%
2023	1,210	+0.46%
Source: INSEE

== Sports ==
=== Racing Club de Mauves ( football ) ===
The RC Mauves is an amateur football club founded in 1983. The club is chaired by Claude Regal. The club celebrated its 30th anniversary in 2013.

== See also ==
- Communes of the Ardèche department
