= Crozes-Hermitage AOC =

French wine

- Wine region
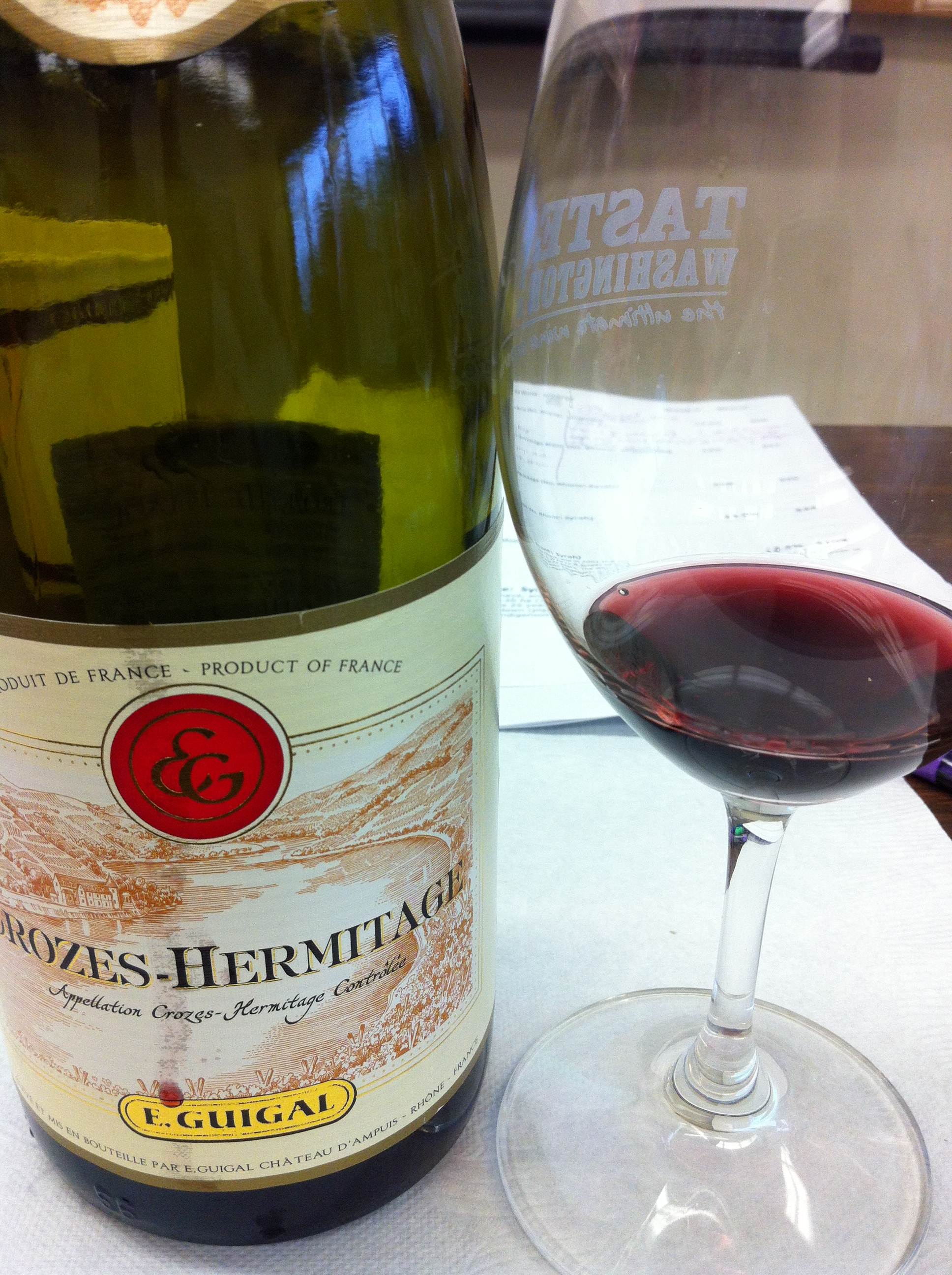
- Type: Appellation d'origine contrôlée
- Country: France
- Part of: Northern Rhone
- Other regions in Northern Rhone: St. Joseph, Cornas, Hermitage, Cote-Rotie
- Climate region: continental climate
- Size of planted vineyards: 1238 hectares
- Grapes produced: Marsanne, Roussanne, Syrah

Crozes-Hermitage (French pronunciation: [kʁoz ɛʁmitaʒ]) is a French wine Appellation d'Origine Contrôlée (AOC) in the northern Rhône wine region of France. The appellation is the largest in the northern Rhone, and its wines are less highly regarded than those from the nearby appellations of Côte-Rôtie or its near-namesake Hermitage. Most of the wines produced here are red wines made from the Syrah grape, sometimes blended with small quantities of white Roussanne or Marsanne grapes. Some white wines are also made, based on Marsanne and/or Roussanne.

== History ==
In 1846, a panel of tasters commended the wine for its likeness to Hermitage wines. The appellation was officially defined in 1937 and was expanded in 1952.

== Climate and geography ==
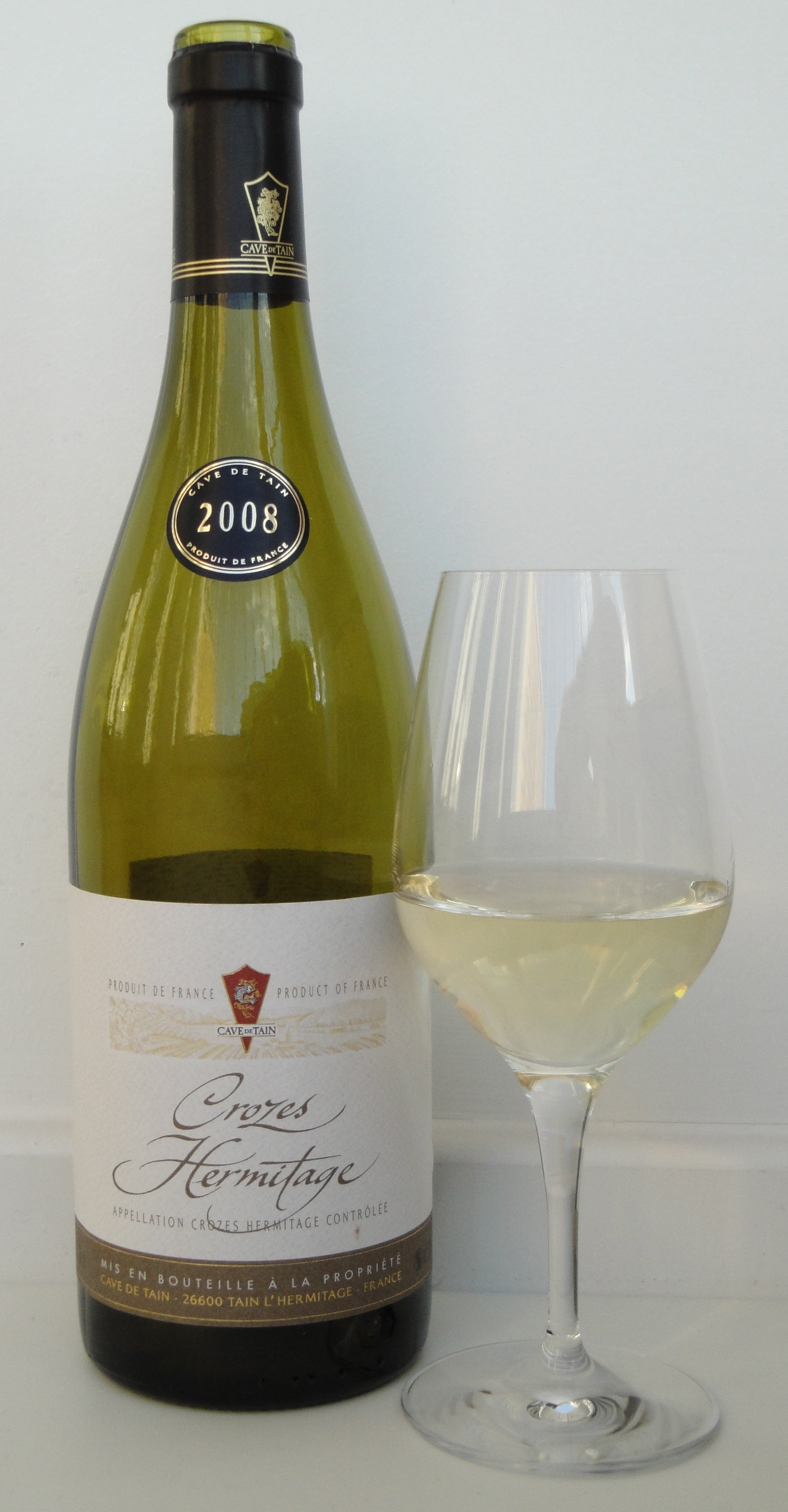
While red wines dominate, white wines are also produced.

Crozes-Hermitage, along with the rest of northern Rhône has a continental climate that differs from its southern neighbour, which has a more Mediterranean climate. Winters are wet and marked by the cold mistral winds that can last into the Spring. The appellation is fairly large by Northern Rhône standards, with its 1,238 hectares accounting for approximately half of the entire region's 2,400 hectares. The appellation's boundary begins around 10 km north of Tain-l'Hermitage, extends around the village of Gervans with its south- and south-western granite slopes and then spreads south around Larnage where the land flattens and consists of more clay. Approaching Tain and the village of Mercurol the land rises again and the appellation spreads east. In this region, the soil is mostly rocks, sand and clay. Just south of Tain galets roulés, small surface stones also found extensively in Châteauneuf-du-Pape in the southern Rhône, appear. The southernmost part of the appellation is flat and newly planted.

== Grapes and wine ==
As with the northern Rhône in general, Crozes-Hermitage produces primarily red wines, with Syrah the only red grape permitted under appellation rules. The rules allow the addition of up to 15% of the white grapes Marsanne and Roussanne. Those two varieties are also used in the white wines in the appellation. The more notable vineyards in Crozes-Hermitage include Les Chassis, Les Sept Chemins and Les Meysonniers.

Many of the red wines are relatively light and intended for early drinking, while others will keep and improve in bottle for several years.

=== Winemaking ===
Crozes-Hermitage is notable for the large amount of cooperative wine. Cave de Tain, a large cooperative, takes half of the grapes grown. Another large producer, Jaboulet, takes a lot of the other half, and also owns its own vineyards. Although a small amount of white grapes can be included when making red wines in this AOC, more and more varietal 100% Syrah wines are being made.
