= Serves-sur-Rhône =

- Commune
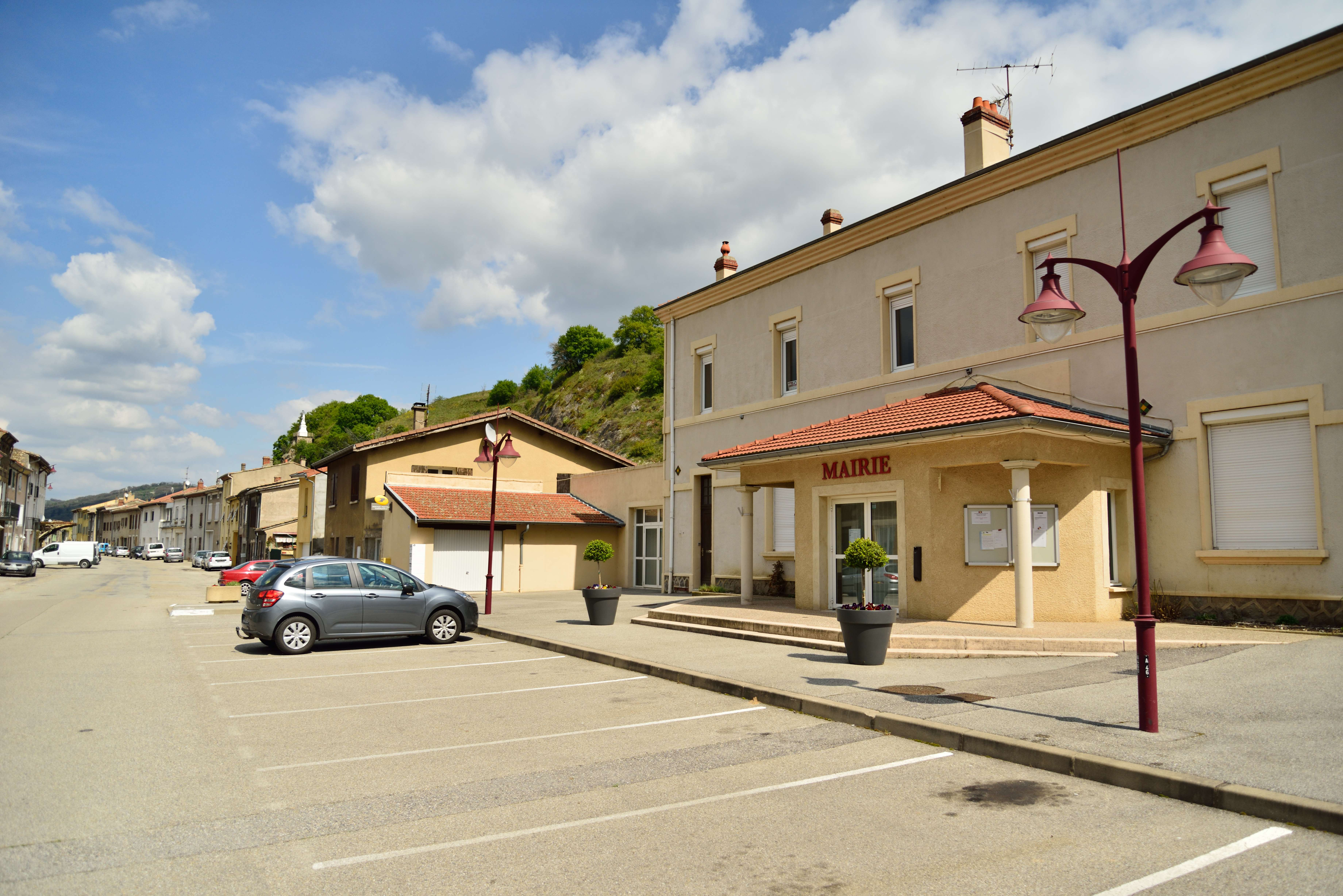
- The town hall in Serves-sur-Rhône

- Coat of arms
- Location of Serves-sur-Rhône
- Location within France Location within Auvergne-Rhône-Alpes
- Coordinates: 45°08′22″N 4°49′06″E
- Country: France
- Region: Auvergne-Rhône-Alpes
- Department: Drôme
- Arrondissement: Valence
- Canton: Tain-l'Hermitage
- Intercommunality: CA Arche Agglo

Government
  - Mayor (2020–2026): Christèle Defrance
- Area^{1}: 6.49 km^{2} (2.51 sq mi)
- Elevation: 123 m (404 ft)
- Highest elevation: 374 m (1,227 ft)
- Lowest elevation: 117 m (384 ft)
- Population (2023): 782
  - Density: 120/km^{2} (312/sq mi)
- Time zone: UTC+01:00 (CET)
  - Summer (DST): UTC+02:00 (CEST)
- INSEE/Postal code: 26341 /26600
- ^{1} French Land Register data, which excludes lakes, ponds, glaciers > 1 km^{2} (0.386 sq mi or 247 acres) and river estuaries.

Serves-sur-Rhône (French pronunciation: [sɛʁv syʁ ʁon]; Occitan: Servìs-sus-Ròna, literally Serves on Rhône) is a commune in the Drôme department in southeastern France.

== Geography ==
Serves-sur-Rhône is positioned on the left bank of the River Rhône, on the Route Nationale 7, roughly 75 km (47 mi) from Lyon and 25 km (16 mi) from both Valence and Romans-sur-Isère.

== Population ==
Historical population
Year	Pop.	±% p.a.
1968	453	—
1975	369	−2.89%
1982	468	+3.45%
1990	624	+3.66%
1999	598	−0.47%
2007	642	+0.89%
2012	763	+3.51%
2017	729	−0.91%
2023	782	+1.18%
Source: INSEE

== Wine ==
The commune is in the AOC Côtes-du-Rhône wine-producing region of Crozes-Hermitage.

== See also ==
- Communes of the Drôme department
