= Granges-les-Beaumont =

- Commune
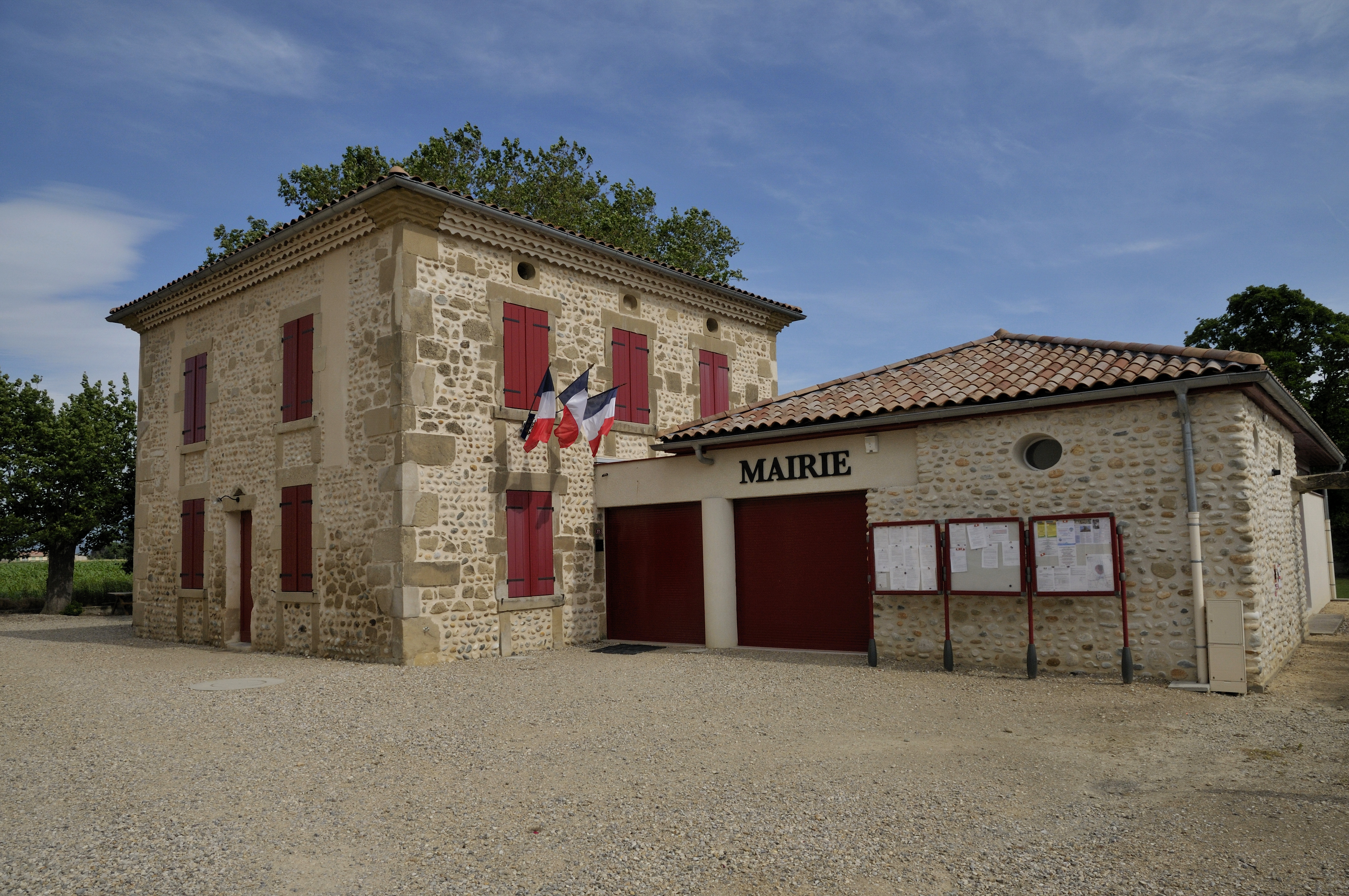
- Town hall
- Location of Granges-les-Beaumont
- Location within France Location within Auvergne-Rhône-Alpes
- Coordinates: 45°03′07″N 4°59′00″E
- Country: France
- Region: Auvergne-Rhône-Alpes
- Department: Drôme
- Arrondissement: Valence
- Canton: Tain-l'Hermitage
- Intercommunality: CA Valence Romans Agglo

Government
  - Mayor (2020–2026): Jacques Abrial
- Area^{1}: 7.51 km^{2} (2.90 sq mi)
- Elevation: 120 m (390 ft)
- Highest elevation: 168 m (551 ft)
- Lowest elevation: 127 m (417 ft)
- Population (2023): 949
  - Density: 126/km^{2} (327/sq mi)
- Time zone: UTC+01:00 (CET)
  - Summer (DST): UTC+02:00 (CEST)
- INSEE/Postal code: 26379 /26600
- ^{1} French Land Register data, which excludes lakes, ponds, glaciers > 1 km^{2} (0.386 sq mi or 247 acres) and river estuaries.

Granges-les-Beaumont (French pronunciation: [ɡʁɑ̃ʒ le bomɔ̃], literally Granges near Beaumont; Occitan: Las Granjas) is a commune in the Drôme department in southeastern France.

== Population ==
Historical population
Year	Pop.	±% p.a.
1968	296	—
1975	288	−0.39%
1982	493	+7.98%
1990	791	+6.09%
1999	948	+2.03%
2007	947	−0.01%
2012	927	−0.43%
2017	927	+0.00%
2023	949	+0.39%
Source: INSEE

== See also ==
- Communes of the Drôme department
