= Pont d'Oxford =

Coordinates: 45°12′27″N 5°42′7.5″E

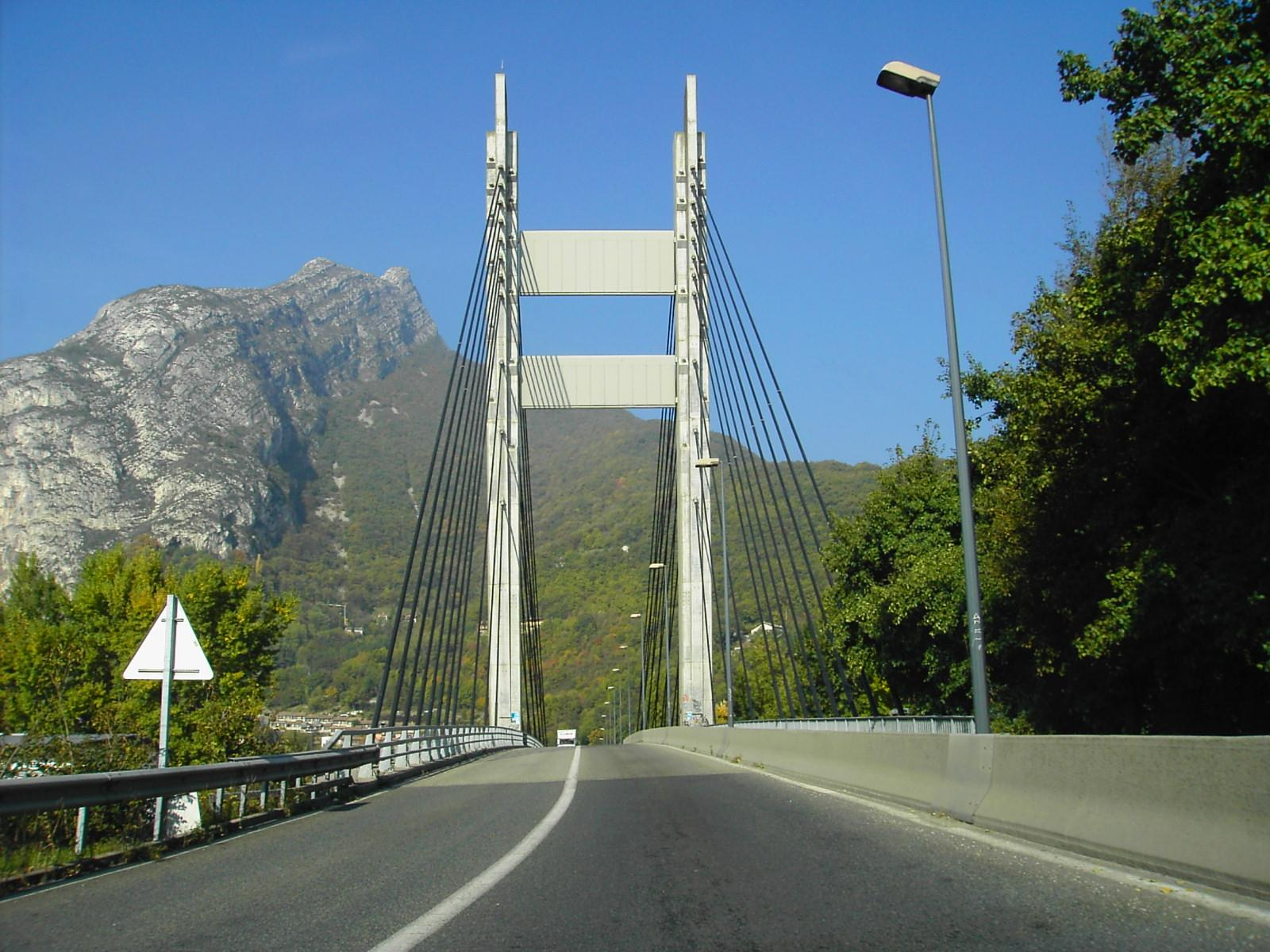
Pont d'Oxford

The Pont d'Oxford is a cable-stayed bridge over the Isère river in Grenoble, France. It was completed in 1991.

The bridge is named after the city of Oxford, with which Grenoble is twinned.
