= Isère (river) =

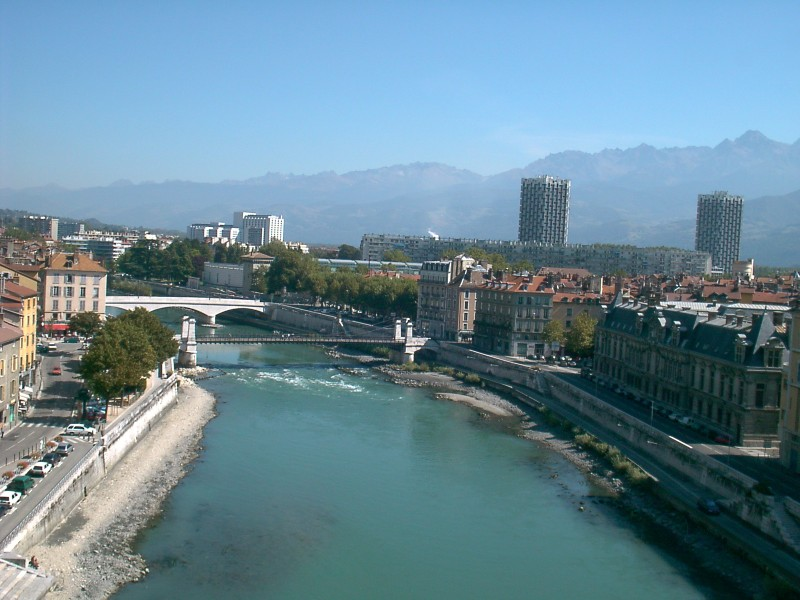
- The Isère in the center of Grenoble

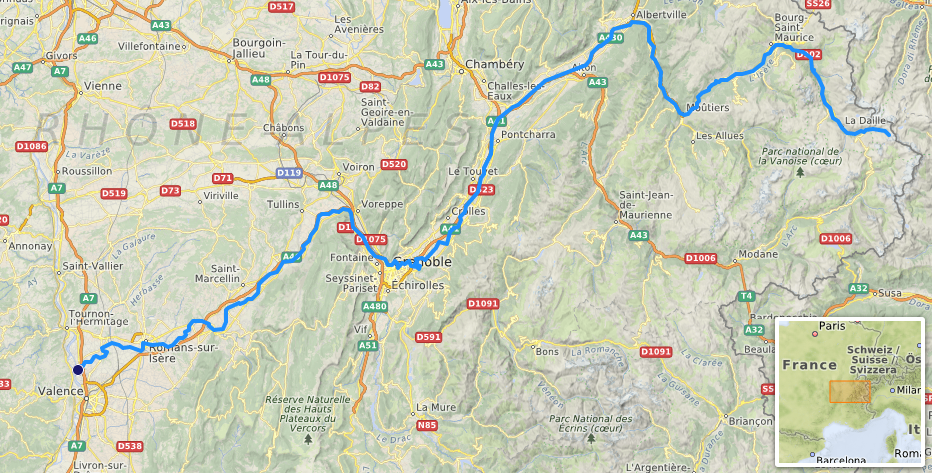
- Path of the Isère
- Native name: Isera (Arpitan); Isèra (Occitan)

Location
- Country: France
- Region: Auvergne-Rhône-Alpes
- Departments: Drôme; Isère; Savoie

Physical characteristics
- Source
  - location: Sources de l'Isère Glacier, Grande Aiguille Rousse, Graian Alps
  - coordinates: 45°26′45″N 7°5′47″E
  - elevation: ±2,900 m (9,500 ft)
- Mouth
  - location: Rhône
  - coordinates: 44°58′56″N 4°51′8″E
  - elevation: ±110 m (360 ft)
- Length: 286 km (178 mi)
- Basin size: 11,890 km^{2} (4,590 sq mi)
- Discharge
  - average: 329 m^{3}/s (11,600 cu ft/s)

Basin features
- Progression: Rhône→ Mediterranean Sea
- Tributaries
  - left: Arc, Drac
  - right: Arly
- Sources: Sandre, Géoportail, Banque Hydro, Symbhi

The Isère (US: /iːˈzɛər/ ee-ZAIR, French: [izɛʁ]; Arpitan: Isera; Occitan: Isèra) is a river in the Auvergne-Rhône-Alpes region of southeastern France. Its source, a glacier known as the Sources de l'Isère, lies in the Vanoise National Park in the Graian Alps of Savoie, near the ski resort in Val-d'Isère on the border with Italy. An important left-bank tributary of the Rhône, the Isère merges with it a few kilometers north of Valence.

Many riverside communes have incorporated the Isère's name into their own, for example, Sainte-Hélène-sur-Isère and Romans-sur-Isère. The department of Isère is likewise named after the river.

== Etymology ==
The name Isère was first recorded under the form Isara, which means "the impetuous one, the swift one." Not originally a Celtic word, it was very likely assimilated by the Celts in ancient times. This word is related to the Indo-European *isərós, meaning "impetuous, quick, vigorous," which is similar to the Sanskrit isiráḥ इसिरः อิสิระ with the same definition. It was probably based on the reconstructed Indo-European root *eis(ə) (and not *is), which incidentally has not been found in the Celtic languages of the British Isles.

The word Isara figures in the etymology of many other river names, from ancient Gaul and its neighboring lands. Examples of this are the Ésera in Spain, the Isar in Germany, the small Franco-Belgian Yser, or even the ancient name of the Oise, Isara (the French adjective isarien still exists in the language and continues to describe anything related to the Oise). In non-Celtic countries, we find the Isarco, a river in Northern Italy, the Éisra and Istrà in Lithuania, Jizera in the Czech Republic and Usora in Bosnia and Herzegovina.

== Geography ==
The Isère's course measures 286 kilometers (178 miles) and runs through a wide variety of landscapes: from its source near the Italian border in the western Alps, it crosses the Pays de Savoie and the Tarentaise Valley, cuts between the Chartreuse and Belledonne mountain ranges, follows the Vercors Massif, passes through the Dauphiné province, and finally meets with the Rhône at the foot of the Vivarais.

=== Valleys ===
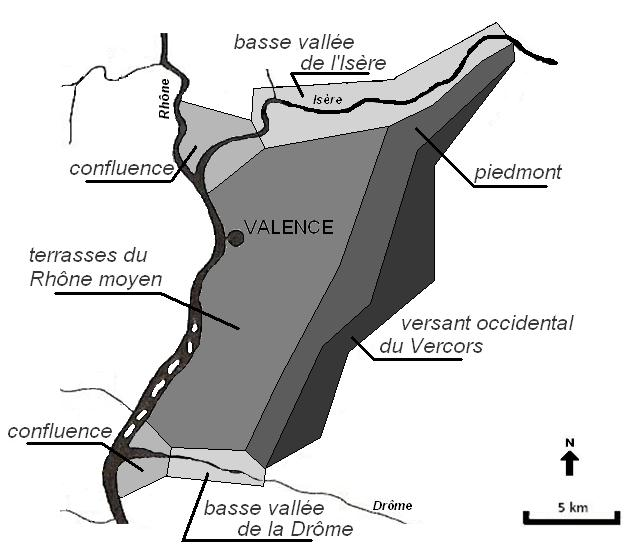
Lower Isère valley (basse vallée de l'Isère) in the north of the Plain of Valence

The upper valley of the Isère is called the Tarentaise, and its middle valley the Grésivaudan.

The lower valley constitutes a section of the Plain of Valence (also called the Valentinois) and is characterized by the river's deep, winding channel. Instead of widening its banks over time, the Isère has dug deeper into its bed, forming stepped fluvial terraces. The valley has clearly defined borders and is relatively narrow, not exceeding 2 km (1.2 mi) in breadth.

The repetition of alluvial deposition (during periods of Quaternary glaciation) and overdeepening (during interglacial periods), known as a fluvioglacial system, led to the formation of several stepped terraces in the lower Isère valley, like the one on which Saint-Marcel-lès-Valence is built. This occurred through the massive accumulation of alluvium from the Isère on top of a bed of Miocene molasse. Today, these terraces still define the geography of the Plain of Valence.

=== Confluence ===
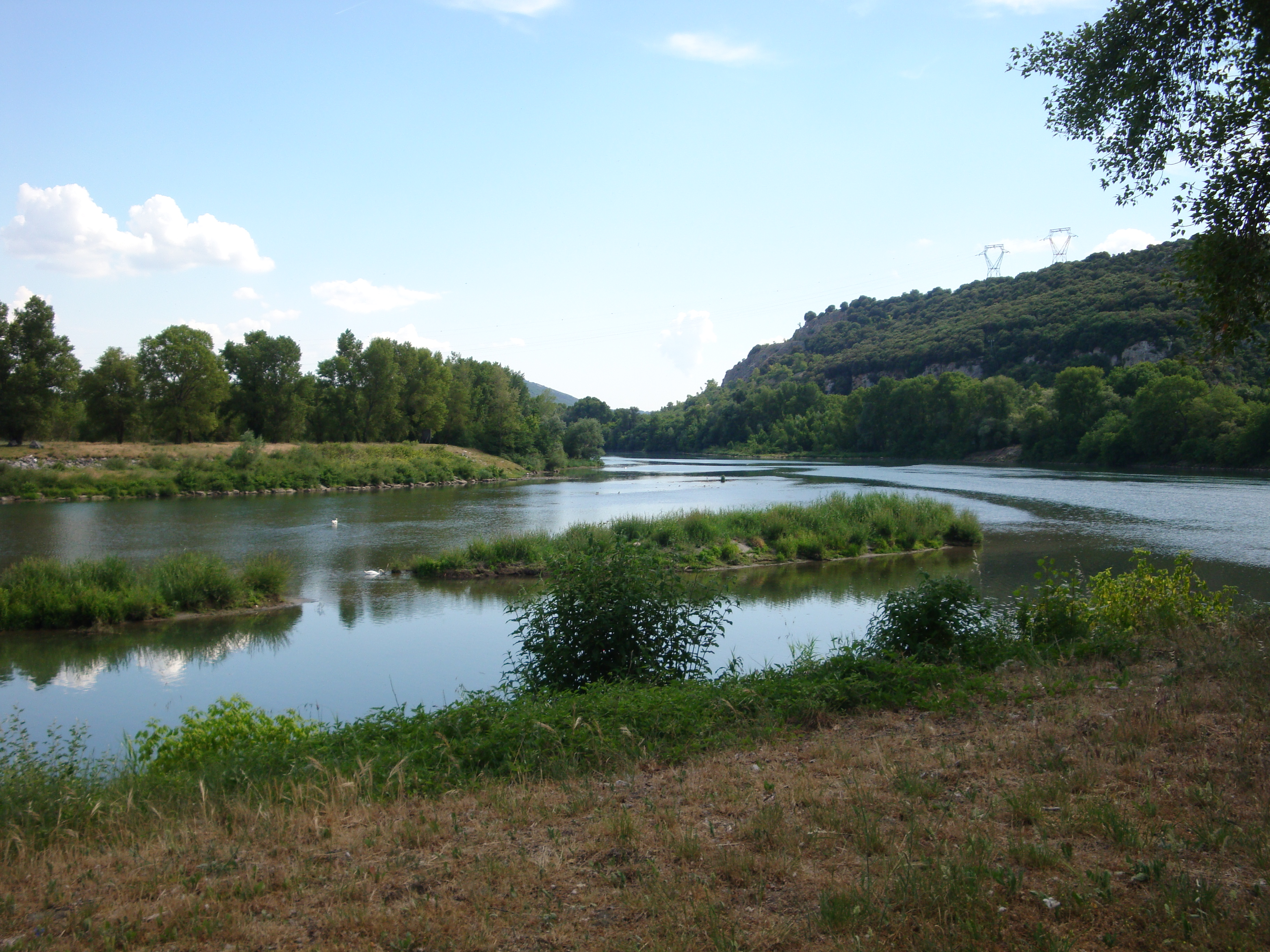
Confluence of the Isère (left) and the Rhône (right) near La Roche-de-Glun

The Isère initially merges with one of the Rhône's diversion canals, built for navigational purposes, at Pont-de-l'Isère. At the southern tip of La Roche-de-Glun (a commune on an island formed by the canal), the Isère Dam drains part of the water back into the Rhône and permits the Isère to continue its course alone until it passes through the Bourg-lès-Valence Dam and reaches its final junction with the Rhône.

=== Main Tributaries ===
(L) Left-bank tributary; (R) Right-bank tributary.

- (L) Doron de Bozel, 38.7 km (24.0 mi)
  - (R) Doron de Champagny, 15.9 km (9.9 mi)
  - (L) Doron des Allues, 20.9 km (13.0 mi)
  - (L) Doron de Belleville, 28.6 km (17.8 mi)
- (R) Arly, 34.5 km (21.4 mi)
  - (L) Chaise, 24 km (15 mi)
  - (L) Doron de Beaufort, 24.1 km (15.0 mi)
- (L) Arc, 127.5 km (79.2 mi)
- (L) Drac, 130.3 km (81.0 mi)
  - (R) Séveraisse, 32.9 km (20.4 mi)
  - (L) Souloise, 25.6 km (15.9 mi)
  - (R) Bonne, 40.1 km (24.9 mi)
  - (L) Ébron, 32.1 km (19.9 mi)
  - (R) Romanche, 78.4 km (48.7 mi)
  - (L) Gresse, 34.6 km (21.5 mi)
- (R) Vence, 17.2 km (10.7 mi)
- (R) Morge, 27.2 km (16.9 mi)
  - Fure, 25.3 km (15.7 mi), via the Morge Canal
- (L) Bourne, 43.1 km (26.8 mi)
  - (L) Vernaison, 32 km (20 mi)
- (R) Herbasse, 40 km (25 mi)

=== Cities on the Isère ===
- Savoie: Val-d'Isère, Bourg-Saint-Maurice, Aime, Moûtiers, Albertville, Montmélian
- Isère: Pontcharra, Grenoble, Voreppe
- Drôme: Romans-sur-Isère, Pont-de-l'Isère, La Roche-de-Glun

== Hydrology ==
Lengthwise profile of the Isère. Vertical: NGF elevation (m). Horizontal: distance from the mouth of the river (km).

The length of the Isère is 286 km (178 mi), and its drainage basin covers 11,890 km^{2} (4,590 sq mi).

The vertical profile of the river is made up of several zones:

- From its sources to Sainte-Foy-Tarentaise (except for those sources having a slope of around 25%), the average slope of the Isère is 5.1%, in a more or less confined valley (forests, gorges, and higher up, grasslands).
- As far as Moûtiers, the slope measures 1.18%.
- Before the river's confluence with the Arly, its slope is only 0.53%.
- The slope decreases to 0.136% until Grenoble.
- Downstream from Grenoble, it measures 0.1%.

The flow of the Isère was observed over a period of 58 years (between 1956 and 2015) at Beaumont-Monteux in the Drôme department, situated near the river's confluence with the Rhône. The discharge of the river at Beaumont-Monteux measured 329 cubic meters per second (11,600 cubic feet per second).

The Isère's large seasonal fluctuations are typical of rivers fed in large part by snowmelt, with springtime flooding raising the average monthly discharge between 382 (13,500) and 500 m^{3}/s (18,000 cu ft/s) from April to July (peaking in May and June), and low water levels in autumn and winter, from August to February, with a minimum average monthly discharge of 246 m^{3}/s (8,700 cu ft/s) in September. Generally speaking, this makes the Isère a very plentiful watercourse throughout the year.

Mean monthly discharge (in m^{3}/s)
Hydrological station : Beaumont-Monteux (data calculated over 58 years)
Source : Banque Hydro - Ministry of Ecology, Sustainable Development and Energy

However, the VCN3 can drop to 110 m^{3}/s (3,900 cu ft/s) during a five-year dry spell, which is very low.

On the other hand, severe flooding can result from rapid thaw or torrential autumn rain. In fact, QIX 2 and QIX 5 are 1,200 (42,000) and 1,500 m^{3}/s (53,000 cu ft/s), respectively. QIX 10 is 1,700 m^{3}/s (60,000 cu ft/s). QIX 20 reaches 1,900 m^{3}/s (67,000 cu ft/s), while QIX 50 rises to 2,200 m^{3}/s (78,000 cu ft/s), which is still moderate compared to other rivers in the south of France, like the Tarn.

The highest instantaneous discharge on record was 2,050 m^{3}/s (72,000 cu ft/s) on September 16, 1960, while the highest daily value was 1,510 m^{3}/s (53,000 cu ft/s) on October 7 of the same year.

The depth of runoff for the Isère's drainage basin is 882 millimeters (34.7 inches) annually, which is quite high above France's average and clearly superior to that of the Rhône's drainage basin (666 mm (26.2 in) in Valence for a surface area of 66,450 km^{2} (25,660 sq mi)). The specific discharge is 27.9 liters per second per square kilometer of drainage basin.

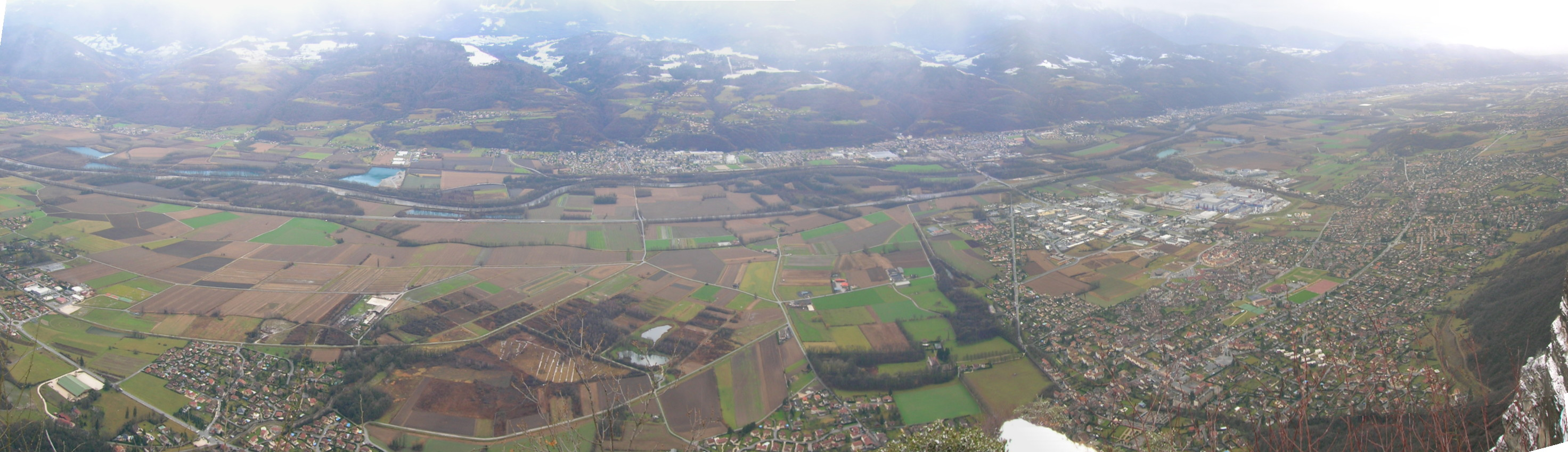
The Isère in the Grésivaudan Valley, seen from the Chartreuse Mountains

== Gallery ==
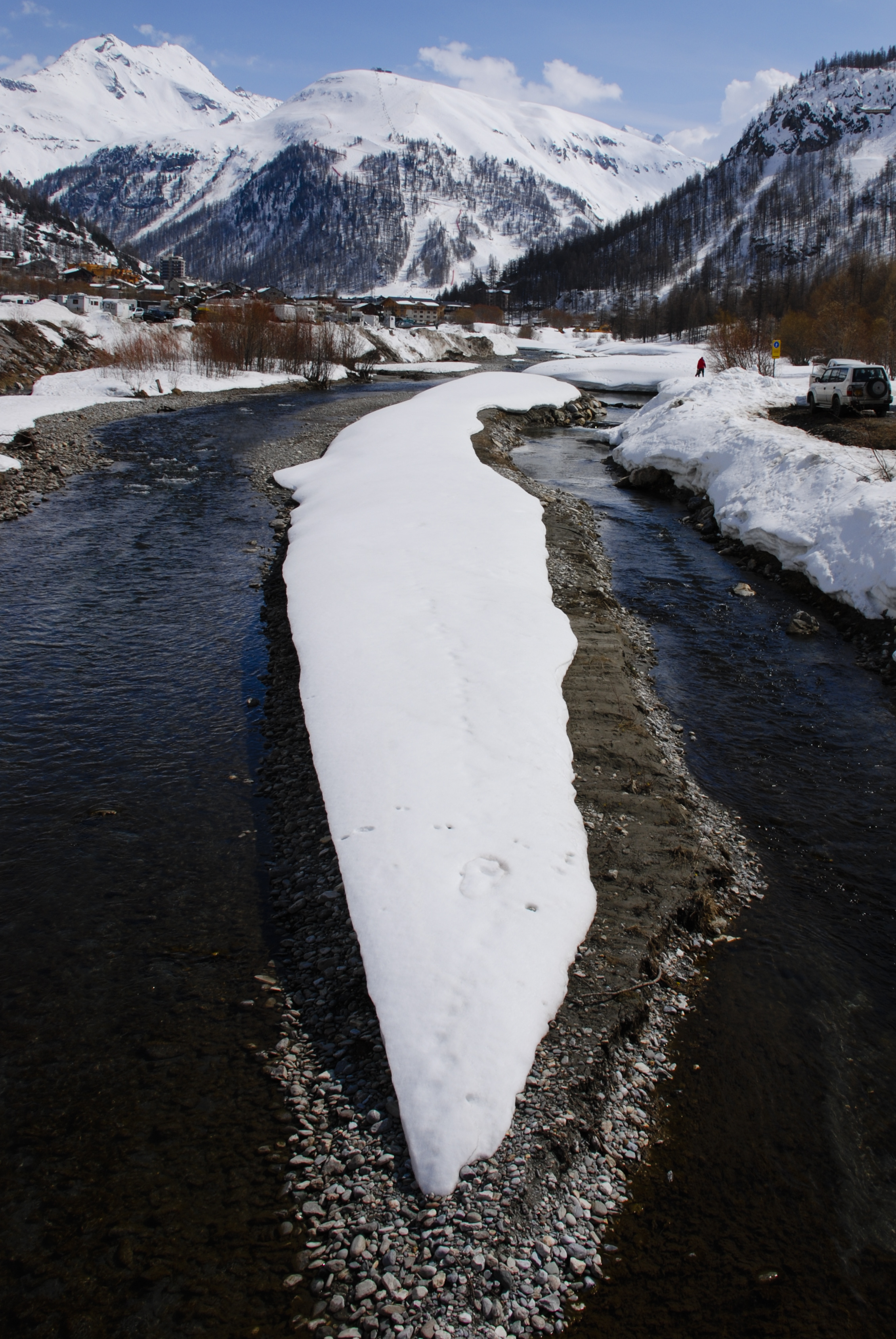
The Isère from La Daille, near Val-d'Isère

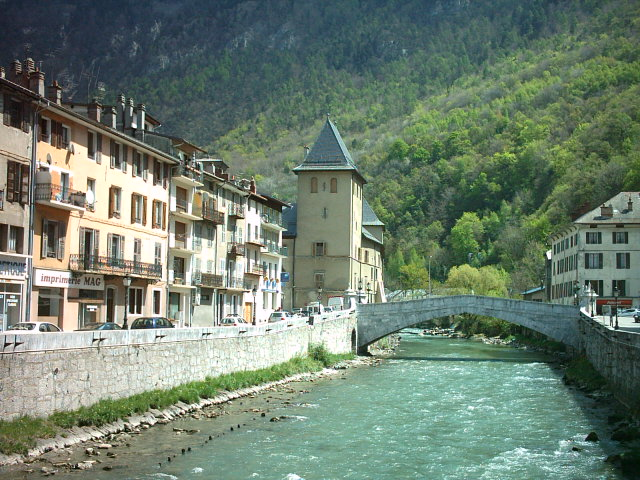
Moûtiers: the Isère and the cathedral

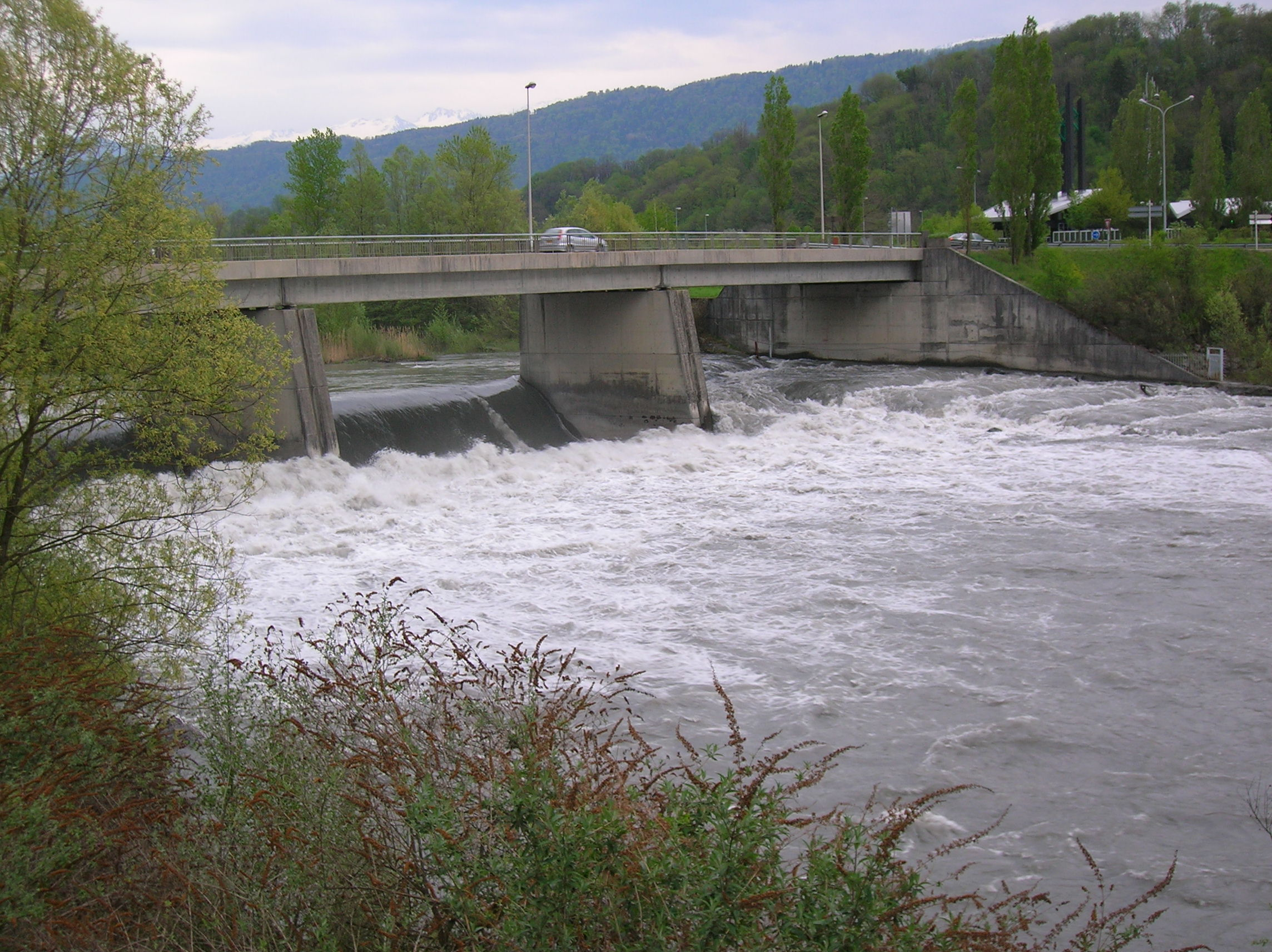
The bridge on the Isère at Montmélian

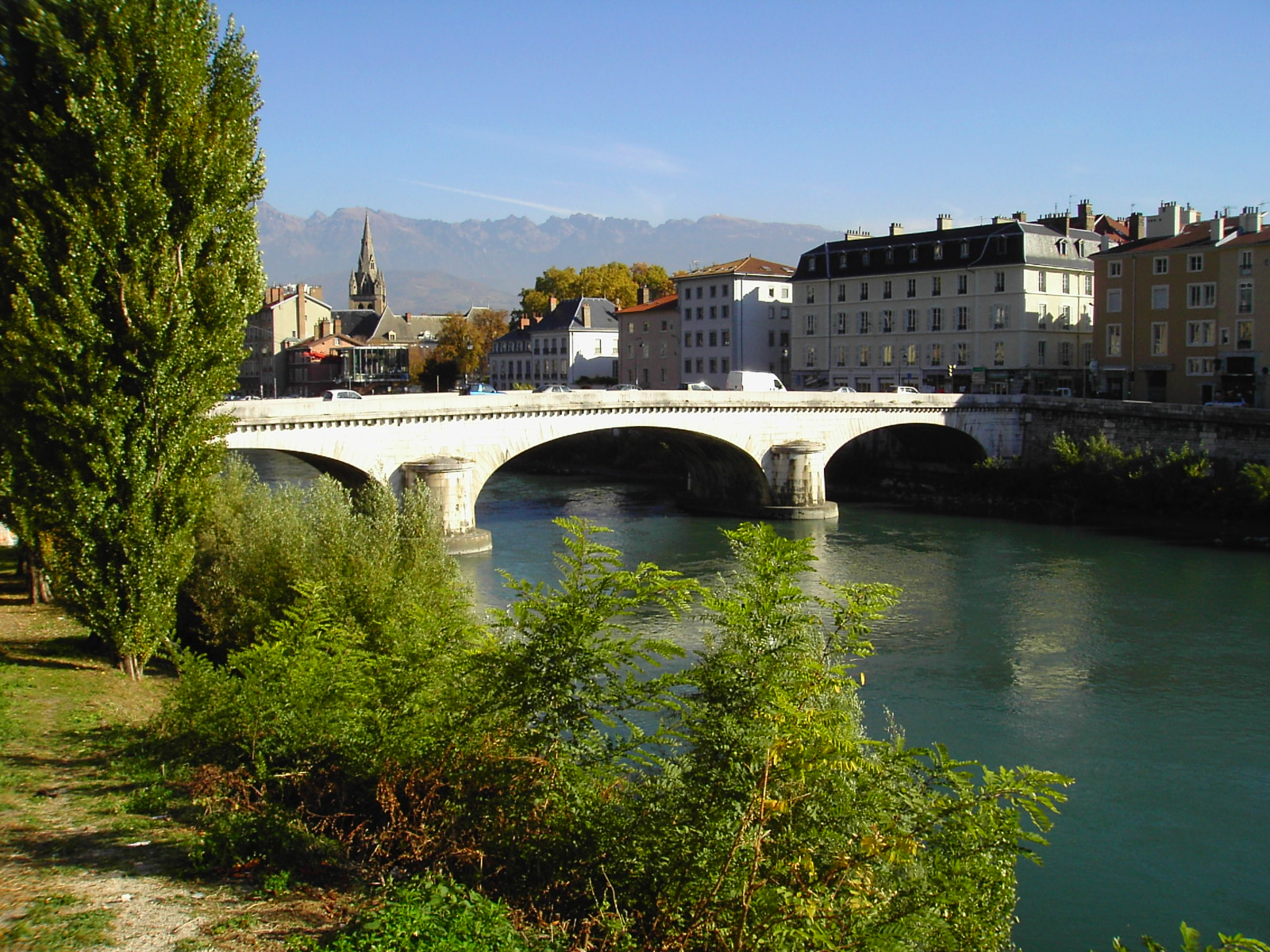
The Isère leaving Grenoble

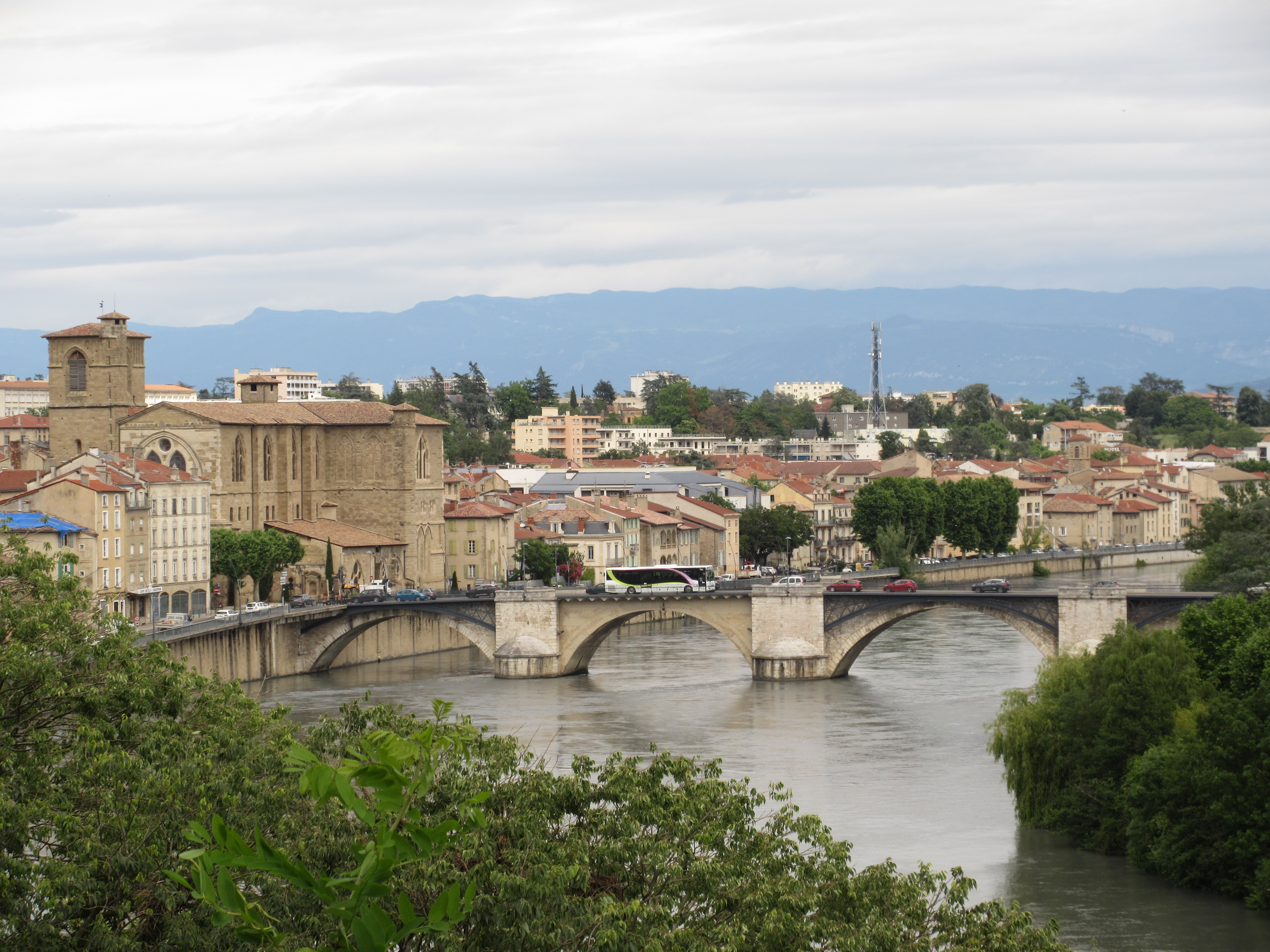
The Isère at Romans-sur-Isère

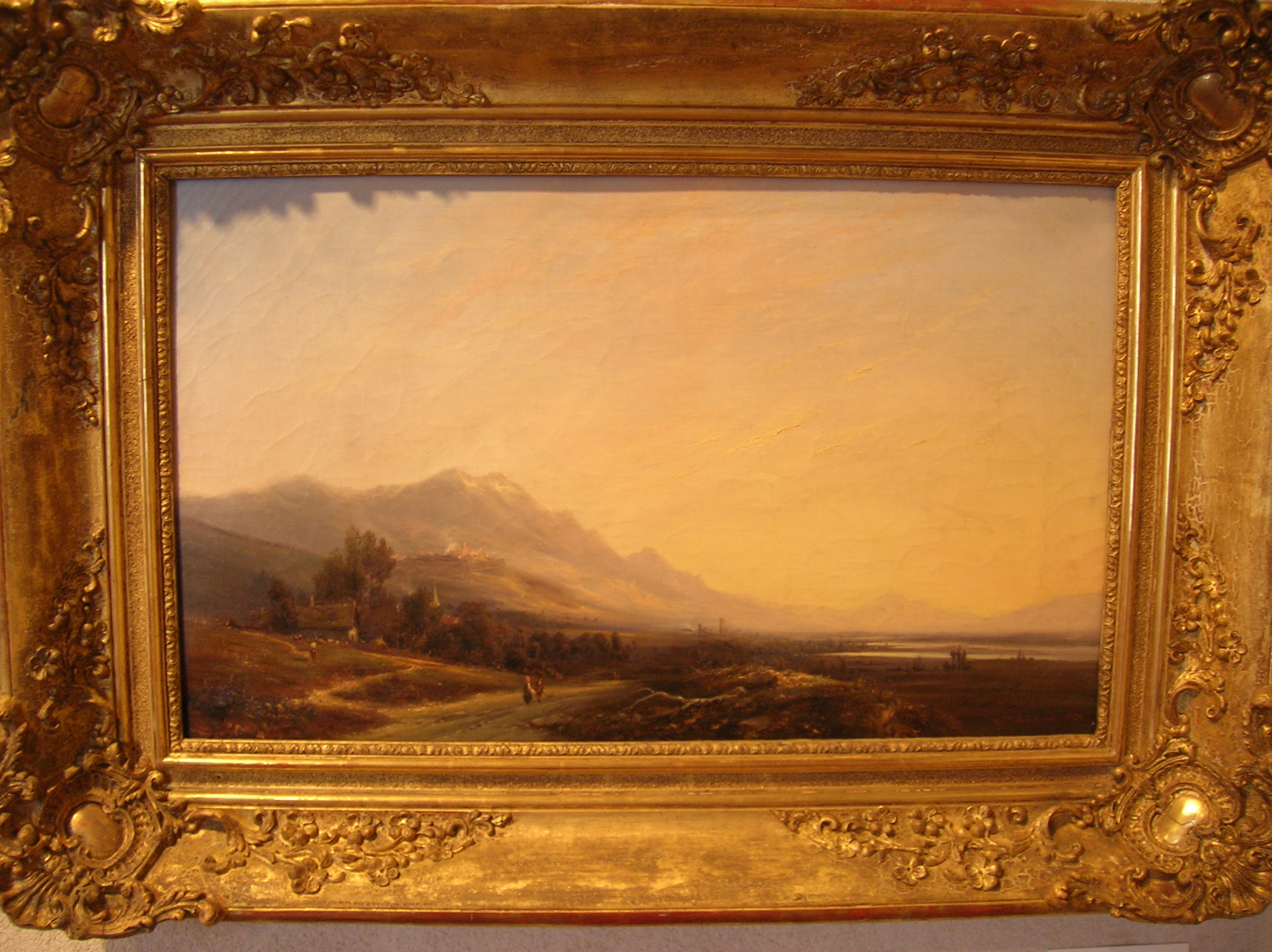
Antoine Guindrand
Paysage de l'Isère [Isère landscape] (1836)

== See also ==
- Association départementale Isère Drac Romanche - maintains the system of flood-risk protection in the plains of the Isère, Drac, and Romanche rivers
- List of rivers of France
