= Veaunes =

Commune in Drôme, France

- Part of Mercurol-Veaunes
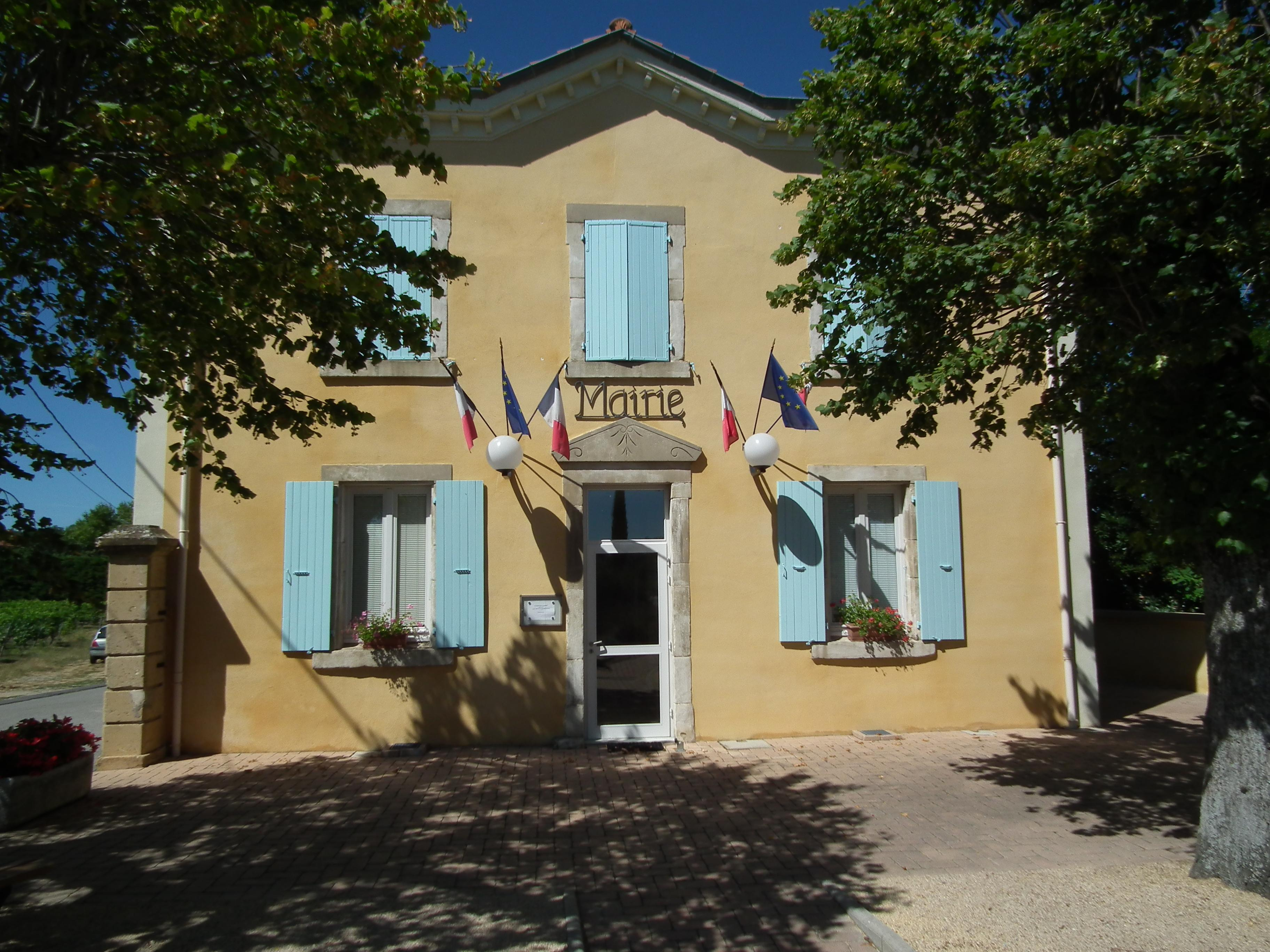
- Town hall
- Location of Veaunes
- Location within France Location within Auvergne-Rhône-Alpes
- Coordinates: 45°05′02″N 4°55′12″E
- Country: France
- Region: Auvergne-Rhône-Alpes
- Department: Drôme
- Arrondissement: Valence
- Canton: Tain-l'Hermitage
- Commune: Mercurol-Veaunes
- Area^{1}: 4.19 km^{2} (1.62 sq mi)
- Elevation: 263 m (863 ft)
- Highest elevation: 278 m (912 ft)
- Lowest elevation: 169 m (554 ft)
- Population (2023): 451
  - Density: 108/km^{2} (279/sq mi)
- Time zone: UTC+01:00 (CET)
  - Summer (DST): UTC+02:00 (CEST)
- Postal code: 26600
- ^{1} French Land Register data, which excludes lakes, ponds, glaciers > 1 km^{2} (0.386 sq mi or 247 acres) and river estuaries.

Veaunes (French pronunciation: [von]) is a former commune in the Drôme department in southeastern France. On 1 January 2016, it was merged into the new commune Mercurol-Veaunes.

== See also ==
- Communes of the Drôme department
