= Communauté d'agglomération Arche Agglo =

Arche Agglo
- Communauté d'agglomération
- Interactive map of Arche Agglo
- Coordinates: 45°04′N 04°50′E
- Country: France
- Region: Auvergne-Rhône-Alpes
- Department: Ardèche, Drôme
- No. of communes: {{{nbcomm}}}
- Established: 2017
- Area: 498.0 km^{2} (192.3 sq mi)
- Population (2019): 57,897
  - Density: 116.3/km^{2} (301.1/sq mi)
- Website: www.archeagglo.fr

Communauté d'agglomération Arche Agglo is the communauté d'agglomération, an intercommunal structure, centred on the town of Tournon-sur-Rhône. It is located in the Ardèche and Drôme departments, in the Auvergne-Rhône-Alpes region, southeastern France. Created in 2017, its seat is in Mauves. Its area is 498.0 km^{2}. Its population was 57,897 in 2019, of which 10,622 in Tournon-sur-Rhône proper.

== Composition ==
The communauté d'agglomération consists of the following 41 communes, of which 21 in the Drôme department:

1. Arlebosc
2. Arthémonay
3. Bathernay
4. Beaumont-Monteux
5. Boucieu-le-Roi
6. Bozas
7. Bren
8. Chanos-Curson
9. Chantemerle-les-Blés
10. Charmes-sur-l'Herbasse
11. Chavannes
12. Cheminas
13. Colombier-le-Jeune
14. Colombier-le-Vieux
15. Crozes-Hermitage
16. Érôme
17. Étables
18. Gervans
19. Glun
20. Larnage
21. La Roche-de-Glun
22. Lemps
23. Margès
24. Marsaz
25. Mauves
26. Mercurol-Veaunes
27. Montchenu
28. Pailharès
29. Plats
30. Pont-de-l'Isère
31. Saint-Barthélemy-le-Plain
32. Saint-Donat-sur-l'Herbasse
33. Saint-Félicien
34. Saint-Jean-de-Muzols
35. Saint-Victor
36. Sécheras
37. Serves-sur-Rhône
38. Tain-l'Hermitage
39. Tournon-sur-Rhône
40. Vaudevant
41. Vion
