= Érôme =

- Commune
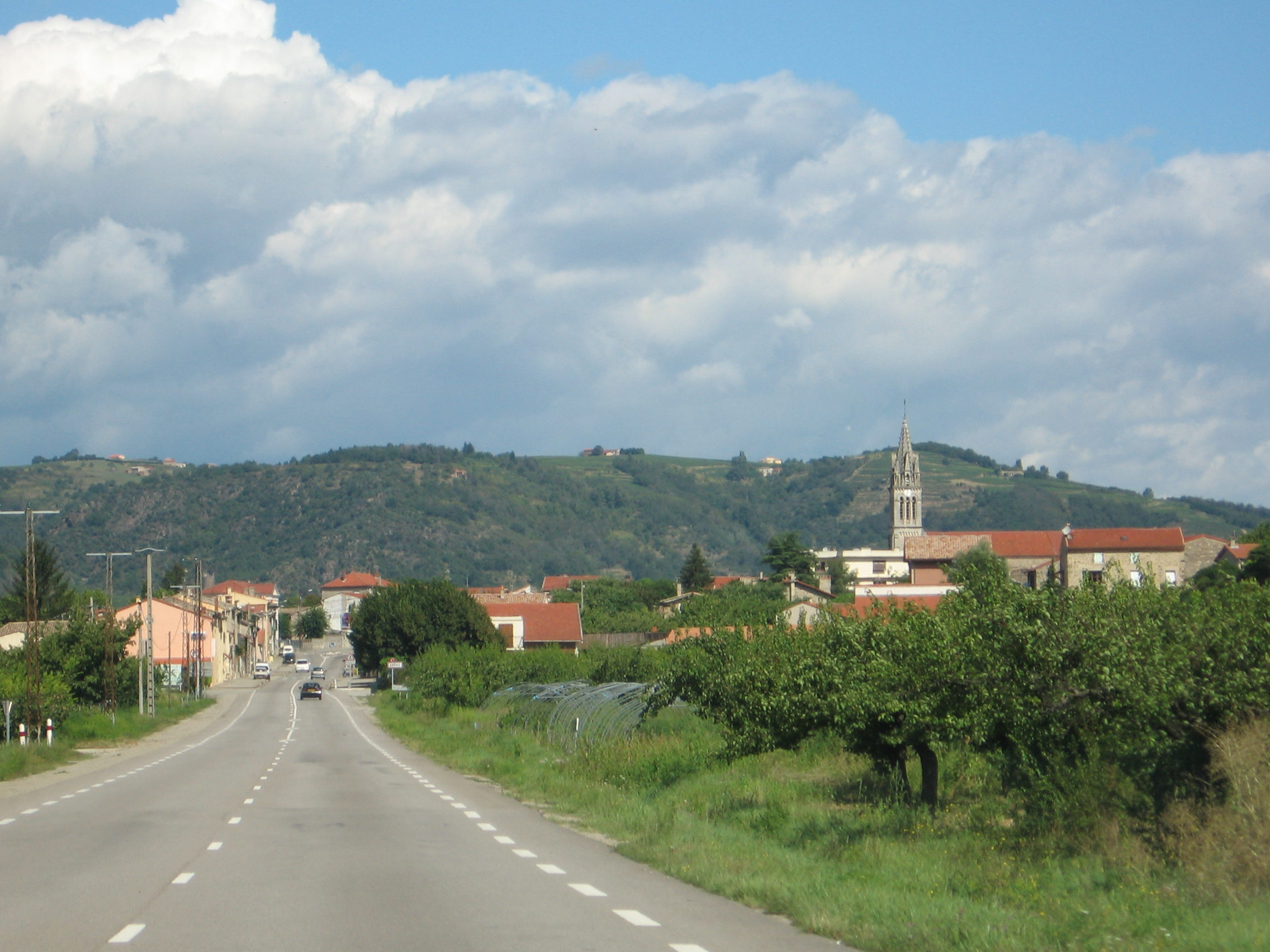
- A general view of Érôme
- Location of Érôme
- Location within France Location within Auvergne-Rhône-Alpes
- Coordinates: 45°07′15″N 4°49′19″E
- Country: France
- Region: Auvergne-Rhône-Alpes
- Department: Drôme
- Arrondissement: Valence
- Canton: Tain-l'Hermitage
- Intercommunality: CA Arche Agglo

Government
  - Mayor (2020–2026): Sandrine Pereira
- Area^{1}: 7.33 km^{2} (2.83 sq mi)
- Elevation: 134 m (440 ft)
- Highest elevation: 377 m (1,237 ft)
- Lowest elevation: 115 m (377 ft)
- Population (2023): 848
  - Density: 116/km^{2} (300/sq mi)
- Time zone: UTC+01:00 (CET)
  - Summer (DST): UTC+02:00 (CEST)
- INSEE/Postal code: 26119 /26600
- ^{1} French Land Register data, which excludes lakes, ponds, glaciers > 1 km^{2} (0.386 sq mi or 247 acres) and river estuaries.

Érôme (French pronunciation: [eʁom]; Occitan: Erauma) is a commune in the Drôme department in the Auvergne-Rhône-Alpes region in southeastern France.

== Population ==
Historical population
Year	Pop.	±% p.a.
1968	624	—
1975	642	+0.41%
1982	626	−0.36%
1990	698	+1.37%
1999	689	−0.14%
2007	782	+1.60%
2012	852	+1.73%
2017	811	−0.98%
2023	848	+0.75%
Source: INSEE

== See also ==
- Communes of the Drôme department
