= Mercurol =

Commune in Drôme, France

- Part of Mercurol-Veaunes
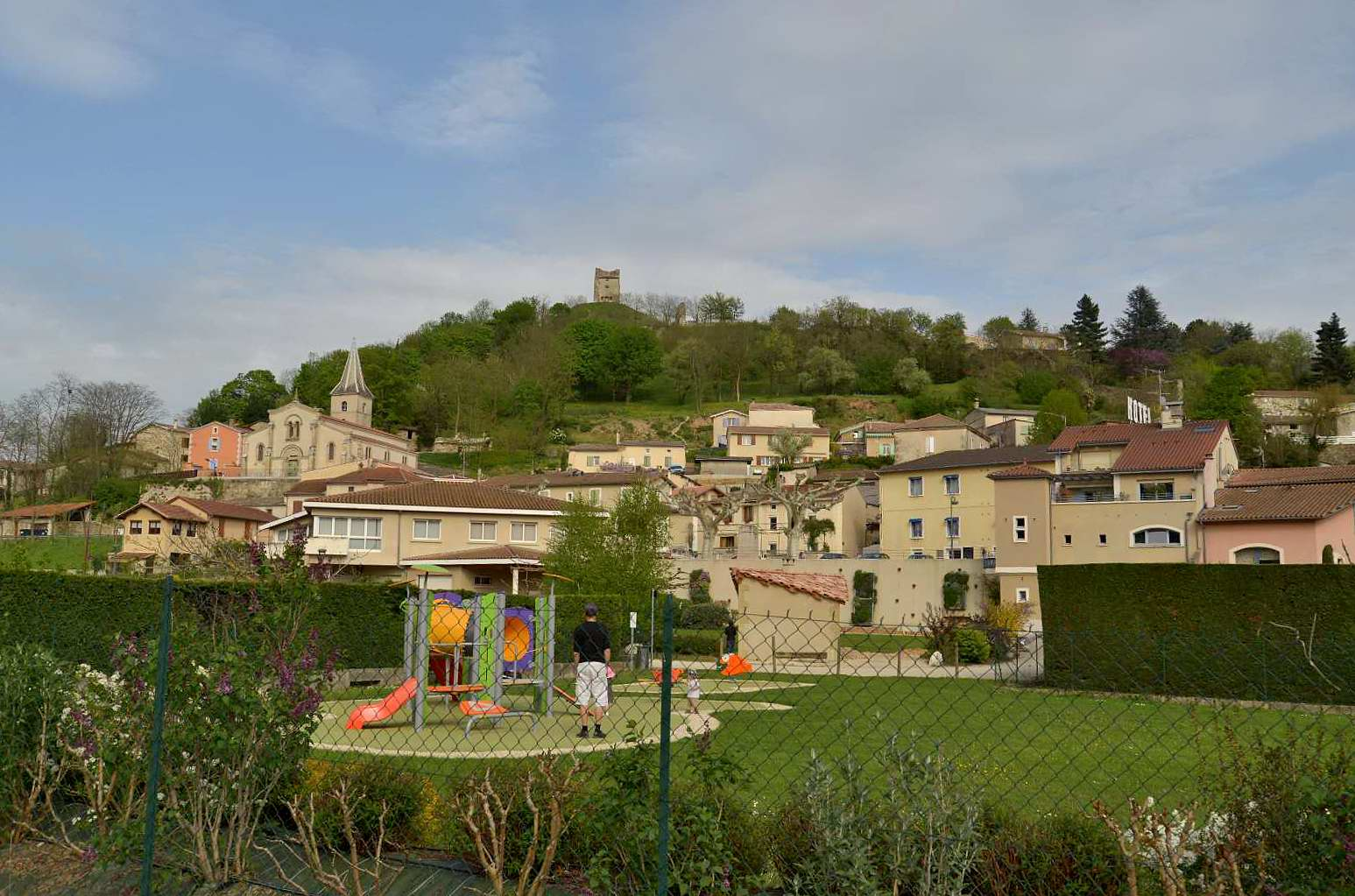
- Location of Mercurol
- Location within France Location within Auvergne-Rhône-Alpes
- Coordinates: 45°04′37″N 4°53′30″E
- Country: France
- Region: Auvergne-Rhône-Alpes
- Department: Drôme
- Arrondissement: Valence
- Canton: Tain-l'Hermitage
- Commune: Mercurol-Veaunes
- Area^{1}: 20.82 km^{2} (8.04 sq mi)
- Elevation: 263 m (863 ft)
- Highest elevation: 287 m (942 ft)
- Lowest elevation: 110 m (360 ft)
- Population (2013): 2,245
  - Density: 107.8/km^{2} (279.3/sq mi)
- Time zone: UTC+01:00 (CET)
  - Summer (DST): UTC+02:00 (CEST)
- Postal code: 26600
- ^{1} French Land Register data, which excludes lakes, ponds, glaciers > 1 km^{2} (0.386 sq mi or 247 acres) and river estuaries.

Mercurol (French pronunciation: [mɛʁkyʁɔl]) is a former commune in the Drôme department in southeastern France. It was located in the district of Valencia. On 1 January 2016, it was merged into the new commune Mercurol-Veaunes.

== Population ==
Historical population
Year	Pop.	±% p.a.
1911	1,002	—
1962	837	−0.35%
1968	907	+1.35%
1975	1,011	+1.56%
1982	1,313	+3.80%
1990	1,643	+2.84%
1999	1,670	+0.18%
2013	2,245	+2.14%
Source: EHESS and INSEE

== See also ==
- Communes of the Drôme department
