= Mercurol-Veaunes =

- Commune
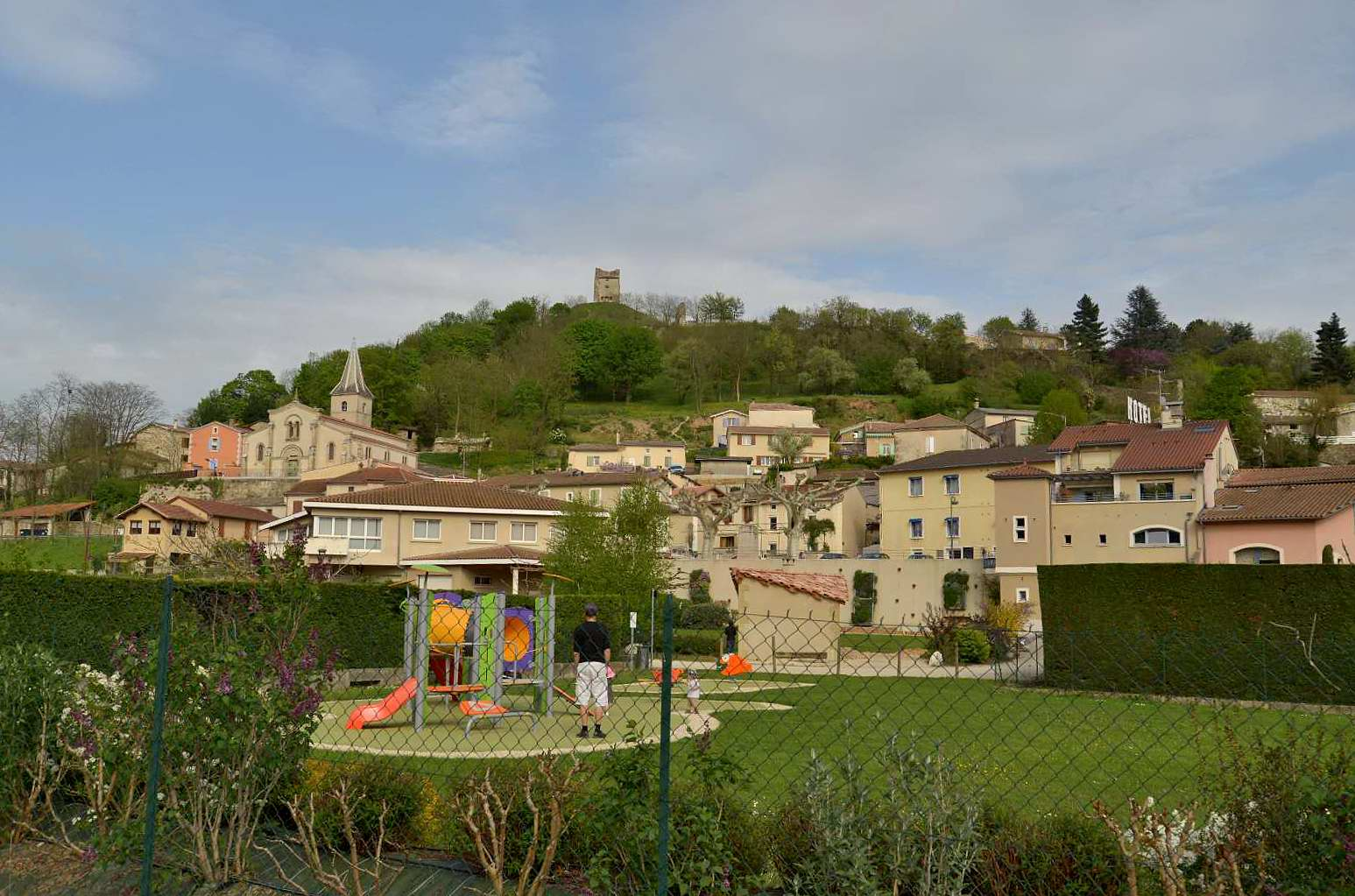
- The village of Mercurol and its tower
- Location of Mercurol-Veaunes
- Location within France Location within Auvergne-Rhône-Alpes
- Coordinates: 45°04′37″N 4°53′28″E
- Country: France
- Region: Auvergne-Rhône-Alpes
- Department: Drôme
- Arrondissement: Valence
- Canton: Tain-l'Hermitage
- Intercommunality: CA Arche Agglo

Government
  - Mayor (2020–2026): Michel Brunet
- Area^{1}: 25.01 km^{2} (9.66 sq mi)
- Population (2023): 2,816
  - Density: 112.6/km^{2} (291.6/sq mi)
- Time zone: UTC+01:00 (CET)
  - Summer (DST): UTC+02:00 (CEST)
- INSEE/Postal code: 26179 /26600
- ^{1} French Land Register data, which excludes lakes, ponds, glaciers > 1 km^{2} (0.386 sq mi or 247 acres) and river estuaries.

Mercurol-Veaunes (French pronunciation: [mɛʁkyʁɔl von]) is a commune in the Drôme department of southeastern France. The municipality was established on 1 January 2016 and consists of the former communes of Mercurol and Veaunes.

== Population ==
Population data refer to the commune in its geography as of January 2025.

Historical population
Year	Pop.	±% p.a.
1968	1,056	—
1975	1,129	+0.96%
1982	1,447	+3.61%
1990	1,836	+3.02%
1999	1,890	+0.32%
2007	2,336	+2.68%
2012	2,512	+1.46%
2017	2,664	+1.18%
2023	2,816	+0.93%
Source: INSEE

== See also ==
- Communes of the Drôme department
