= Chantemerle-les-Blés =

- Commune
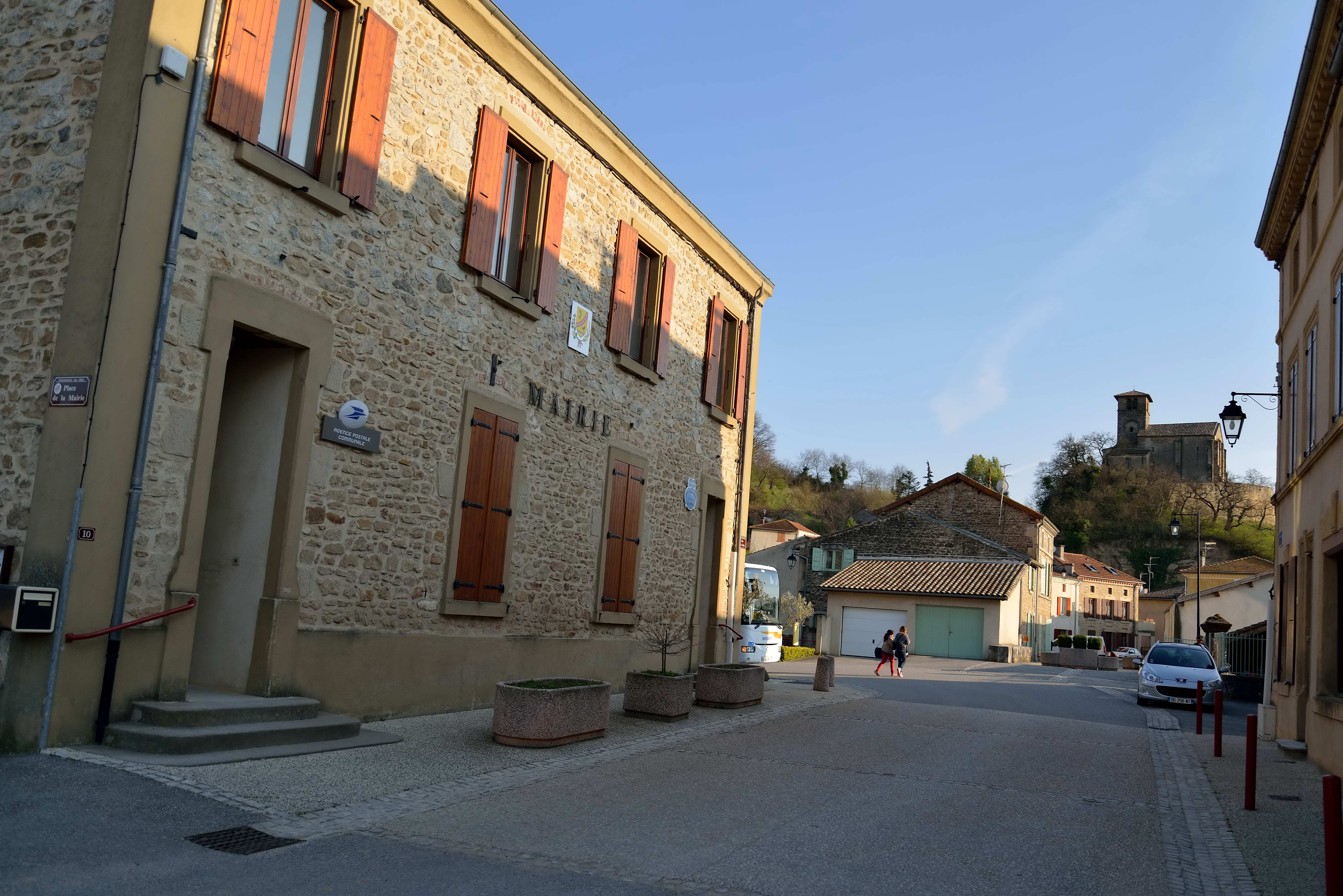
- The town hall of Chantemerle-les-Blés

- Coat of arms
- Location of Chantemerle-les-Blés
- Location within France Location within Auvergne-Rhône-Alpes
- Coordinates: 45°06′41″N 4°53′51″E
- Country: France
- Region: Auvergne-Rhône-Alpes
- Department: Drôme
- Arrondissement: Valence
- Canton: Tain-l'Hermitage
- Intercommunality: CA Arche Agglo

Government
  - Mayor (2020–2026): Vincent Robin
- Area^{1}: 15.39 km^{2} (5.94 sq mi)
- Elevation: 197 m (646 ft)
- Highest elevation: 339 m (1,112 ft)
- Lowest elevation: 171 m (561 ft)
- Population (2023): 1,343
  - Density: 87.26/km^{2} (226.0/sq mi)
- Time zone: UTC+01:00 (CET)
  - Summer (DST): UTC+02:00 (CEST)
- INSEE/Postal code: 26072 /26600
- ^{1} French Land Register data, which excludes lakes, ponds, glaciers > 1 km^{2} (0.386 sq mi or 247 acres) and river estuaries.

Chantemerle-les-Blés (French pronunciation: [ʃɑ̃tmɛʁl le ble]; Occitan: Chantamèrle) is a commune in the Drôme department in southeastern France.

== Population ==
Historical population
Year	Pop.	±% p.a.
1968	610	—
1975	572	−0.91%
1982	557	−0.38%
1990	732	+3.47%
1999	880	+2.07%
2007	1,082	+2.62%
2012	1,170	+1.58%
2017	1,282	+1.85%
2023	1,343	+0.78%
Source: INSEE

== See also ==
- Communes of the Drôme department
