= Chanos-Curson =

- Commune
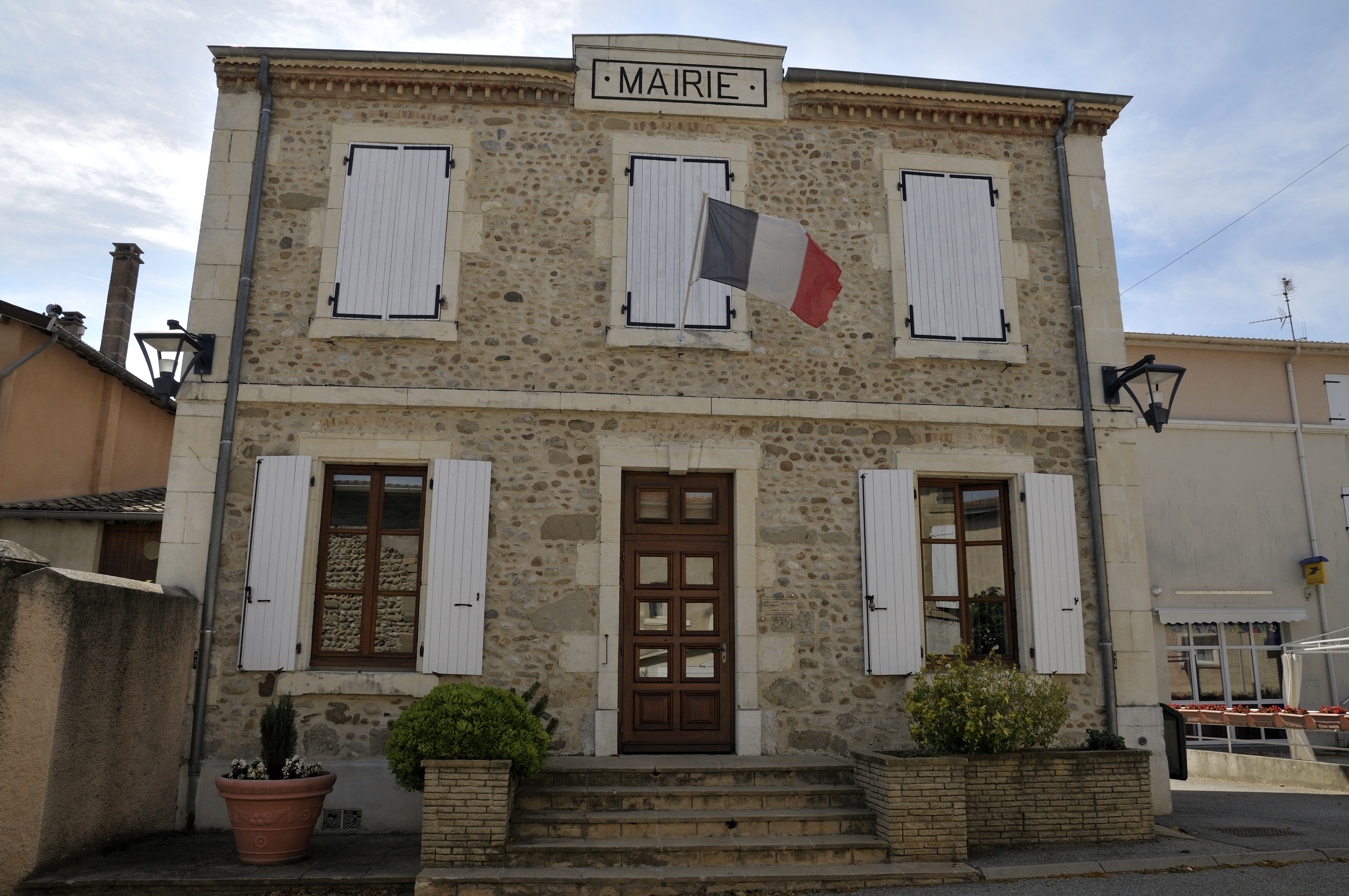
- Town hall
- Location of Chanos-Curson
- Location within France Location within Auvergne-Rhône-Alpes
- Coordinates: 45°03′46″N 4°54′51″E
- Country: France
- Region: Auvergne-Rhône-Alpes
- Department: Drôme
- Arrondissement: Valence
- Canton: Tain-l'Hermitage
- Intercommunality: CA Arche Agglo

Government
  - Mayor (2020–2026): Isabelle Freiche
- Area^{1}: 8.18 km^{2} (3.16 sq mi)
- Elevation: 154 m (505 ft)
- Highest elevation: 273 m (896 ft)
- Lowest elevation: 142 m (466 ft)
- Population (2023): 1,196
  - Density: 146/km^{2} (379/sq mi)
- Time zone: UTC+01:00 (CET)
  - Summer (DST): UTC+02:00 (CEST)
- INSEE/Postal code: 26071 /26600
- ^{1} French Land Register data, which excludes lakes, ponds, glaciers > 1 km^{2} (0.386 sq mi or 247 acres) and river estuaries.

Chanos-Curson is a commune of the Drôme department in southeastern France.

== Population ==
Historical population
Year	Pop.	±% p.a.
1968	624	—
1975	641	+0.38%
1982	722	+1.71%
1990	773	+0.86%
1999	944	+2.25%
2007	1,075	+1.64%
2012	1,082	+0.13%
2017	1,078	−0.07%
2023	1,196	+1.75%
Source: INSEE

== See also ==
- Communes of the Drôme department
