= Morge (Isère) =

River in eastern France

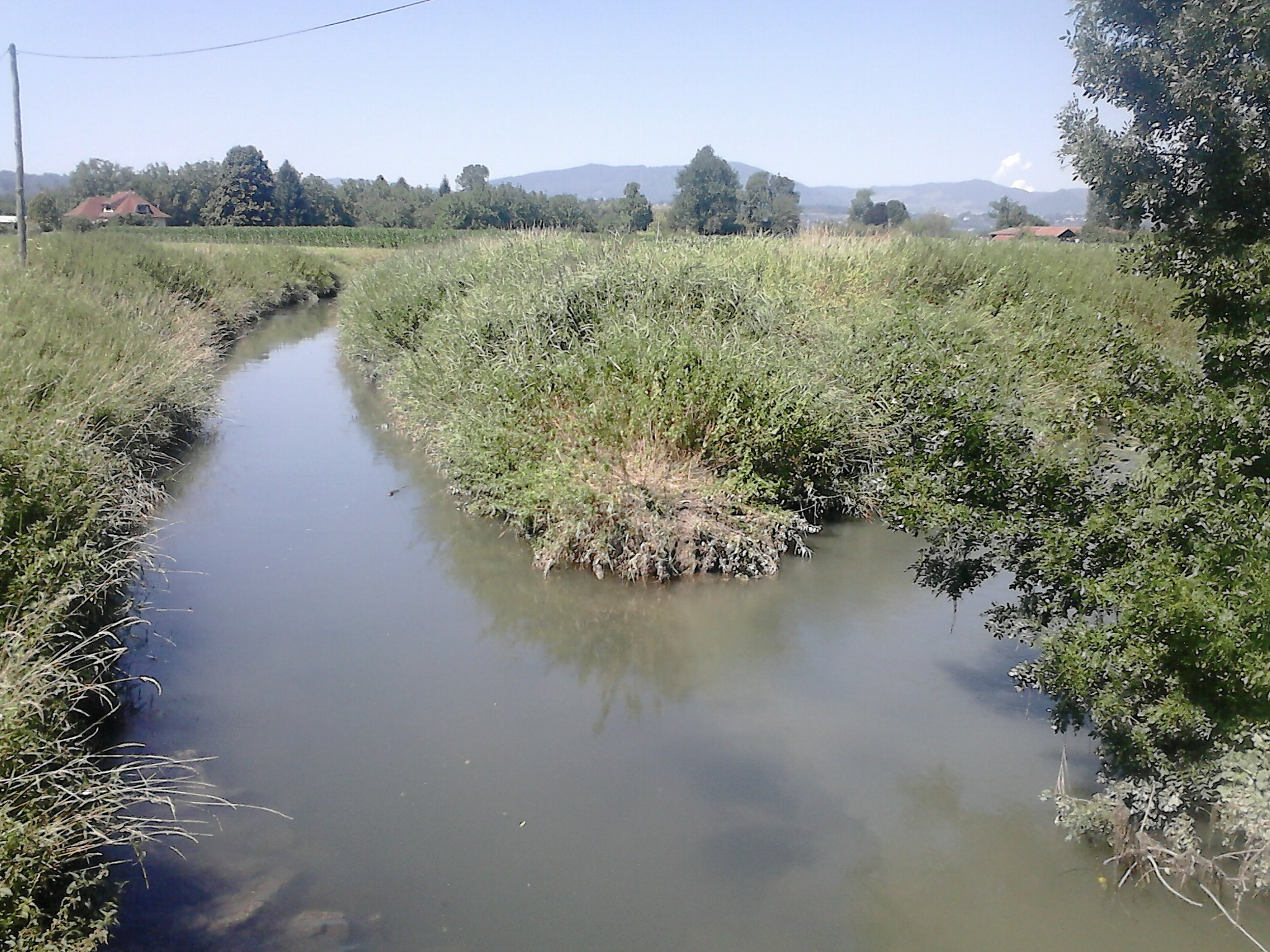

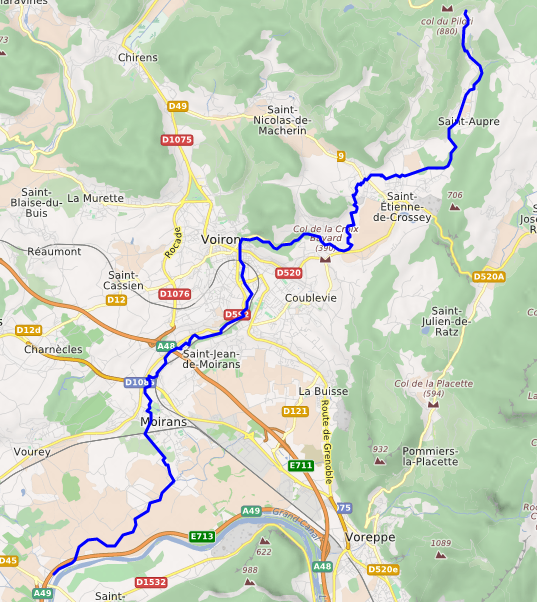

Location
- Country: France

Physical characteristics
- Mouth
  - location: Isère
  - coordinates: 45°13′43″N 5°29′6″E
- Length: 27.1 km (16.8 mi)

Basin features
- Progression: Isère→ Rhône→ Mediterranean Sea

The Morge (French pronunciation: [mɔʁʒ]) is a small river in eastern France (in the Isère department), a right tributary of the Isère. Its source is near the Col de Saint-Roch, northeast of Voiron. It flows through Voiron, and joins the Isère south of Voiron, opposite the town of Saint-Quentin-sur-Isère. It is 27.1 kilometres (16.8 mi) long.
