= Tain-l'Hermitage =

- Commune
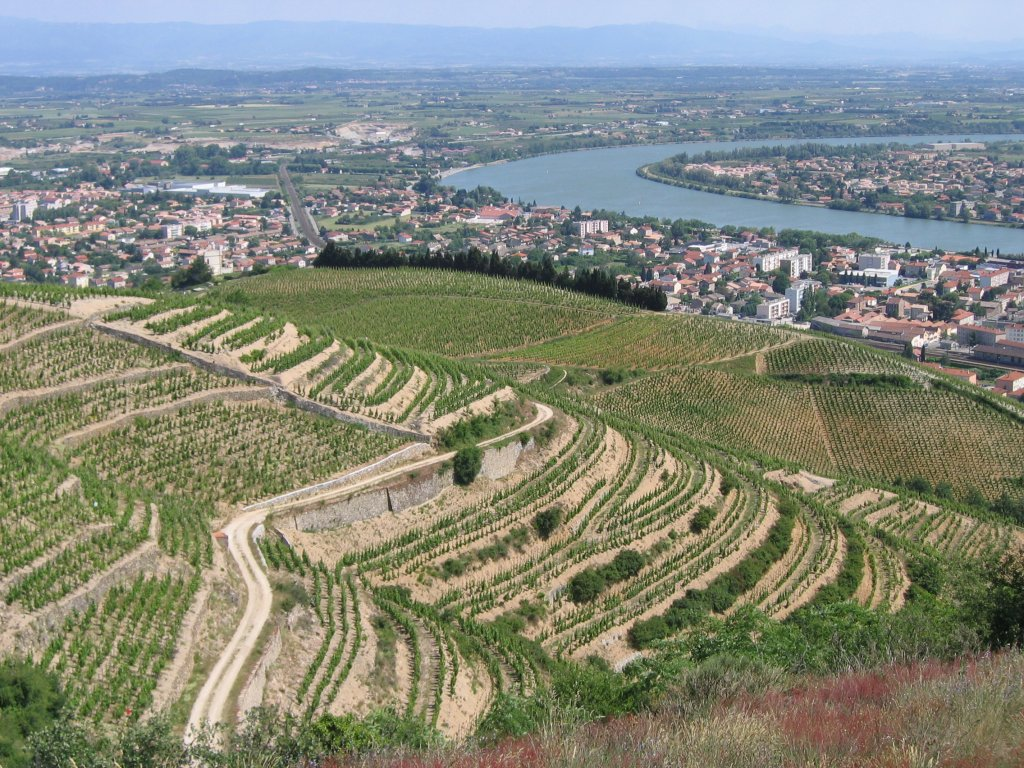
- The town of Tain l'Hermitage and its vineyards

- Coat of arms
- Location of Tain-l'Hermitage
- Location within France Location within Auvergne-Rhône-Alpes
- Coordinates: 45°04′18″N 4°50′35″E
- Country: France
- Region: Auvergne-Rhône-Alpes
- Department: Drôme
- Arrondissement: Valence
- Canton: Tain-l'Hermitage
- Intercommunality: CA Arche Agglo

Government
  - Mayor (2020–2026): Xavier Angéli
- Area^{1}: 4.85 km^{2} (1.87 sq mi)
- Elevation: 125 m (410 ft)
- Highest elevation: 280 m (920 ft)
- Lowest elevation: 115 m (377 ft)
- Population (2023): 5,915
  - Density: 1,220/km^{2} (3,160/sq mi)
- Demonym: Tinois(e) or Tainois(e)
- Time zone: UTC+01:00 (CET)
  - Summer (DST): UTC+02:00 (CEST)
- INSEE/Postal code: 26347 /26600
- ^{1} French Land Register data, which excludes lakes, ponds, glaciers > 1 km^{2} (0.386 sq mi or 247 acres) and river estuaries.

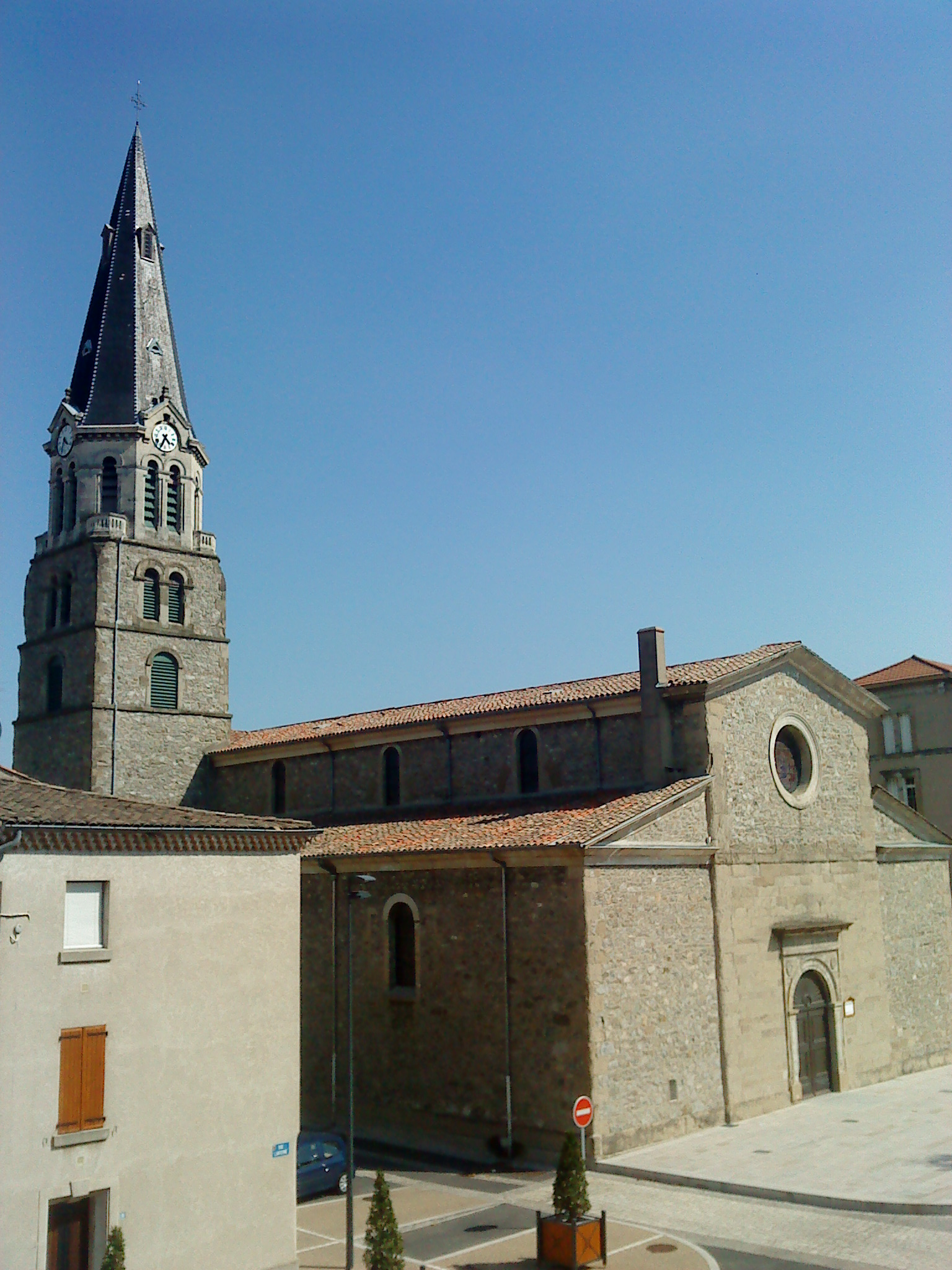
Church of St. Vincent

Tain-l'Hermitage (French pronunciation: [tɛ̃ lɛʁmitaʒ]; Occitan: Tinh de l'Ermitatge or Tenh de l'Ermitatge), commonly known as Tain, is a commune in the French department of Drôme, southeastern France.

== Geography ==
It is located on the left bank of the river Rhône, opposite Tournon-sur-Rhône, which is located in Ardèche. The view from the vine-covered hill above the town has attracted many tourists including, in 1788, future American President Thomas Jefferson.

== Economy ==
A notable wine producing commune, wines include Hermitage AOC and Crozes-Hermitage AOC, Cornas AOC. The red wines are produced from Syrah, and the whites from Marsanne and/or Roussanne. Tain-l'Hermitage is home to a large number of wineries, including Maison M. Chapoutier, Caves de Tain and Paul Jaboulet Âiné, as well as many smaller domaines.

In 1818 the commune was the home of French wine négociant Calvet, founded by Jean-Marie Calvet. It rapidly expanded, opening an office and store in Bordeaux and a château in the Médoc.

== International relations ==
The commune is twinned with:

- Fellbach, Germany
- Erba, Italy

== Population ==
Historical population

Year	Pop.	±% p.a.
1793	1,432	—
1800	1,410	−0.22%
1806	1,494	+0.97%
1821	1,853	+1.45%
1831	2,340	+2.36%
1836	2,338	−0.02%
1841	2,459	+1.01%
1846	2,541	+0.66%
1851	2,647	+0.82%
1856	2,726	+0.59%
1861	2,782	+0.41%
1866	2,822	+0.29%
1872	3,100	+1.58%
1876	2,860	−1.99%
1881	2,893	+0.23%
1886	3,038	+0.98%
1891	3,085	+0.31%
1896	2,928	−1.04%
1901	3,148	+1.46%

Year	Pop.	±% p.a.
1906	3,227	+0.50%
1911	3,062	−1.04%
1921	2,938	−0.41%
1926	3,213	+1.81%
1931	3,427	+1.30%
1936	3,748	+1.81%
1946	3,913	+0.43%
1954	4,044	+0.41%
1962	5,077	+2.88%
1968	5,377	+0.96%
1975	5,563	+0.49%
1982	5,387	−0.46%
1990	5,003	−0.92%
1999	5,503	+1.06%
2007	5,740	+0.53%
2012	5,845	+0.36%
2017	6,162	+1.06%
2023	5,915	−0.68%

Source: EHESS and INSEE (1968-2023)

== See also ==
- Communes of the Drôme department
