= Larnage =

- Commune
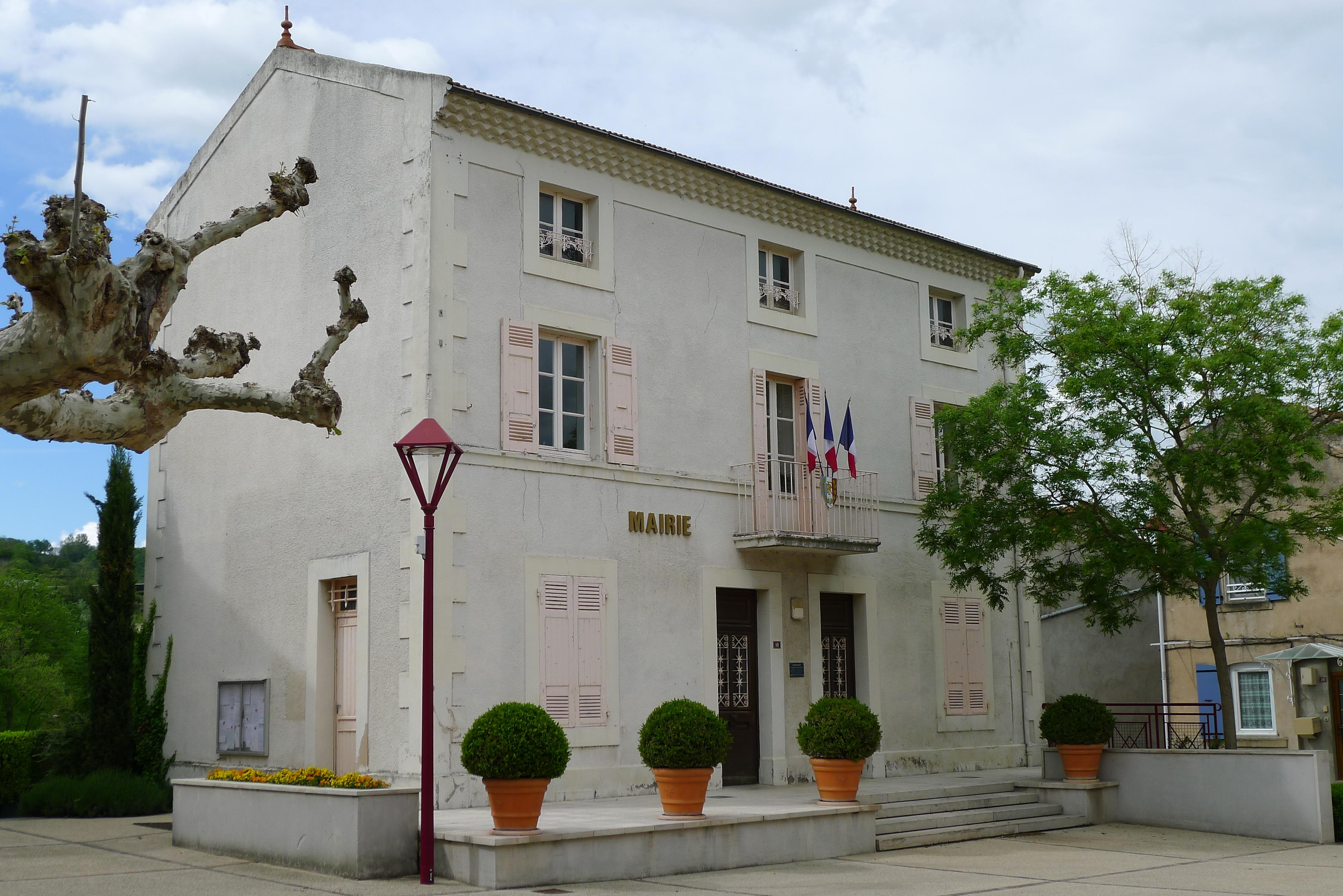
- Town hall
- Location of Larnage
- Location within France Location within Auvergne-Rhône-Alpes
- Coordinates: 45°05′52″N 4°51′52″E
- Country: France
- Region: Auvergne-Rhône-Alpes
- Department: Drôme
- Arrondissement: Valence
- Canton: Tain-l'Hermitage
- Intercommunality: CA Arche Agglo

Government
  - Mayor (2020–2026): Gérard Roberton
- Area^{1}: 9.08 km^{2} (3.51 sq mi)
- Elevation: 247 m (810 ft)
- Highest elevation: 360 m (1,180 ft)
- Lowest elevation: 135 m (443 ft)
- Population (2023): 1,009
  - Density: 111/km^{2} (288/sq mi)
- Time zone: UTC+01:00 (CET)
  - Summer (DST): UTC+02:00 (CEST)
- INSEE/Postal code: 26156 /26600
- ^{1} French Land Register data, which excludes lakes, ponds, glaciers > 1 km^{2} (0.386 sq mi or 247 acres) and river estuaries.

Larnage (French pronunciation: [laʁnaʒ]; Occitan: Larnatge) is a commune in the Drôme department in southeastern France.

== Population ==
Historical population
| Year | Pop. | ±% p.a. |
|---|---|---|
| 1968 | 526 | — |
| 1975 | 566 | +1.05% |
| 1982 | 631 | +1.57% |
| 1990 | 663 | +0.62% |
| 1999 | 770 | +1.68% |
| 2007 | 982 | +3.09% |
| 2012 | 1,024 | +0.84% |
| 2017 | 1,078 | +1.03% |
| 2023 | 1,009 | −1.10% |
Source: INSEE

== See also ==
- Communes of the Drôme department
