= Gervans =

- Commune
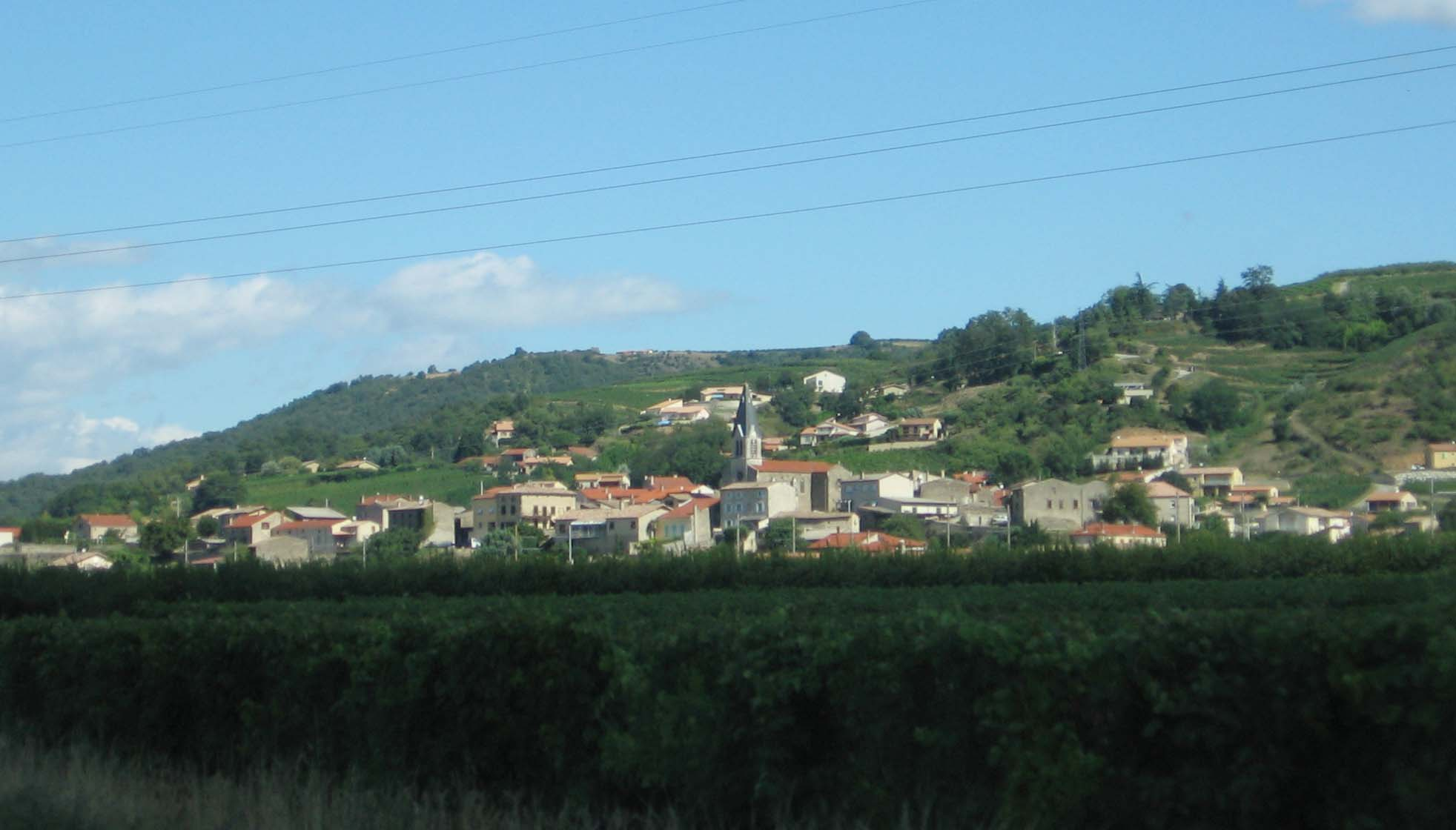
- A general view of Gervans
- Location of Gervans
- Location within France Location within Auvergne-Rhône-Alpes
- Coordinates: 45°06′31″N 4°49′55″E
- Country: France
- Region: Auvergne-Rhône-Alpes
- Department: Drôme
- Arrondissement: Valence
- Canton: Tain-l'Hermitage
- Intercommunality: CA Arche Agglo

Government
  - Mayor (2020–2026): Pascal Claudel
- Area^{1}: 3.28 km^{2} (1.27 sq mi)
- Elevation: 134 m (440 ft)
- Highest elevation: 350 m (1,150 ft)
- Lowest elevation: 109 m (358 ft)
- Population (2023): 545
  - Density: 166/km^{2} (430/sq mi)
- Time zone: UTC+01:00 (CET)
  - Summer (DST): UTC+02:00 (CEST)
- INSEE/Postal code: 26380 /26600
- ^{1} French Land Register data, which excludes lakes, ponds, glaciers > 1 km^{2} (0.386 sq mi or 247 acres) and river estuaries.

Gervans (French pronunciation: [ʒɛʁvɑ̃]) is a commune in the Drôme department in southeastern France.

== Population ==
Historical population
Year	Pop.	±% p.a.
1968	268	—
1975	274	+0.32%
1982	315	+2.01%
1990	341	+1.00%
1999	436	+2.77%
2007	524	+2.32%
2012	565	+1.52%
2017	554	−0.39%
2023	545	−0.27%
Source: INSEE

== See also ==
- Communes of the Drôme department
