= Glun =

- Commune
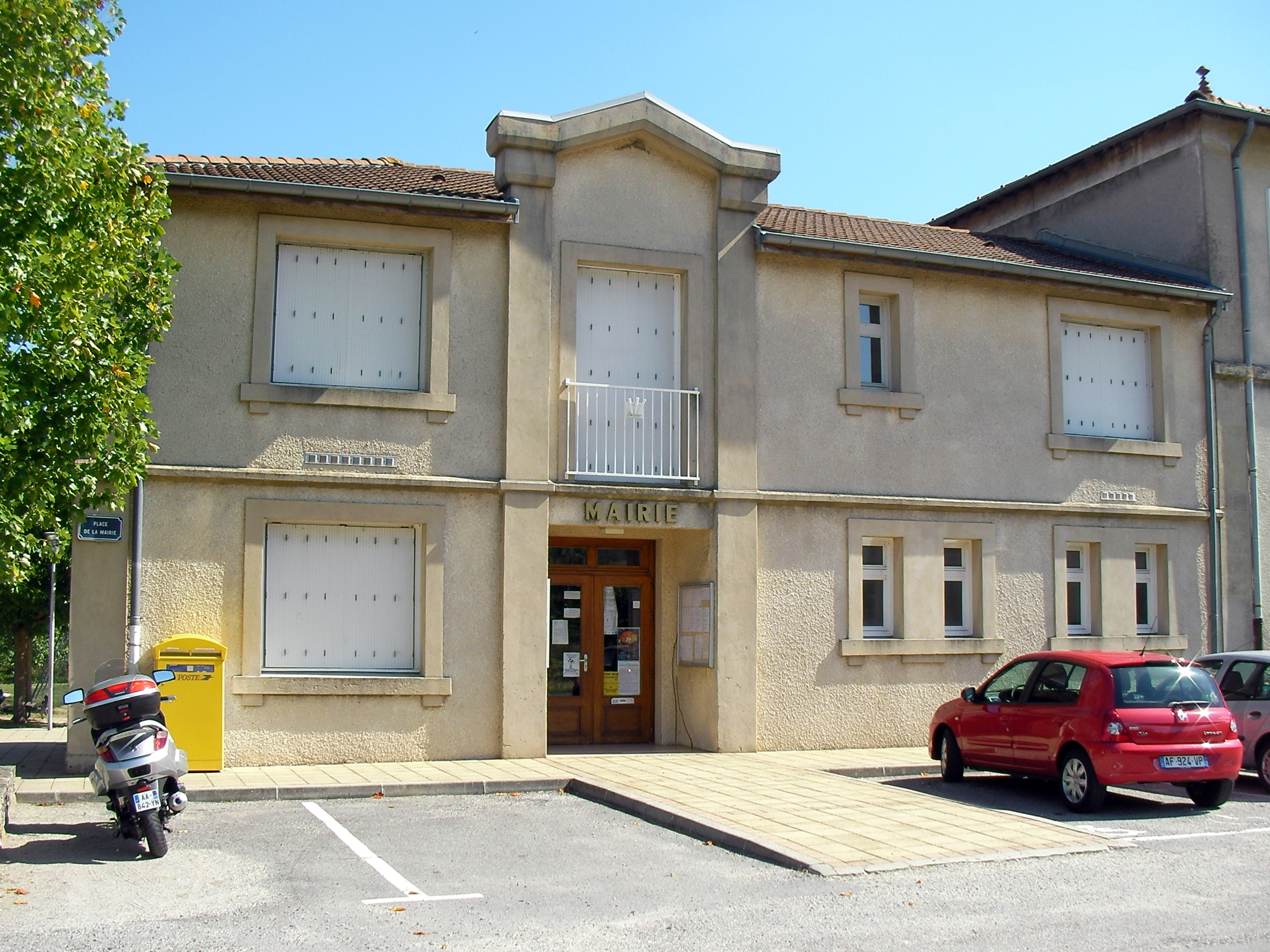
- Town hall
- Location of Glun
- Location within France Location within Auvergne-Rhône-Alpes
- Coordinates: 45°01′01″N 4°50′21″E
- Country: France
- Region: Auvergne-Rhône-Alpes
- Department: Ardèche
- Arrondissement: Tournon-sur-Rhône
- Canton: Tournon-sur-Rhône
- Intercommunality: CA Arche Agglo

Government
  - Mayor (2020–2026): Jacques Luyton
- Area^{1}: 7.56 km^{2} (2.92 sq mi)
- Elevation: 116 m (381 ft)
- Highest elevation: 472 m (1,549 ft)
- Lowest elevation: 105 m (344 ft)
- Population (2023): 677
  - Density: 89.6/km^{2} (232/sq mi)
- Time zone: UTC+01:00 (CET)
  - Summer (DST): UTC+02:00 (CEST)
- INSEE/Postal code: 07097 /07300
- ^{1} French Land Register data, which excludes lakes, ponds, glaciers > 1 km^{2} (0.386 sq mi or 247 acres) and river estuaries.

Glun (French pronunciation: [ɡlœ̃]) is a commune in the Ardèche department in southeastern France.

== Population ==
Historical population
| Year | Pop. | ±% p.a. |
|---|---|---|
| 1968 | 266 | — |
| 1975 | 314 | +2.40% |
| 1982 | 322 | +0.36% |
| 1990 | 395 | +2.59% |
| 1999 | 502 | +2.70% |
| 2007 | 658 | +3.44% |
| 2012 | 694 | +1.07% |
| 2017 | 696 | +0.06% |
| 2023 | 677 | −0.46% |
Source: INSEE

== See also ==
- Communes of the Ardèche department
