= Canton of Tain-l'Hermitage =

Coordinates: 45.07°N 4.84°E

The canton of Tain-l'Hermitage is an administrative division of the Drôme department, southeastern France. Its borders were modified at the French canton reorganisation which came into effect in March 2015. Its seat is in Tain-l'Hermitage.

It consists of the following communes:

1. Beaumont-Monteux
2. Chanos-Curson
3. Chantemerle-les-Blés
4. Châteauneuf-sur-Isère
5. Crozes-Hermitage
6. Érôme
7. Gervans
8. Granges-les-Beaumont
9. Larnage
10. Mercurol-Veaunes
11. Pont-de-l'Isère
12. La Roche-de-Glun
13. Serves-sur-Rhône
14. Tain-l'Hermitage
