= La Roche-de-Glun =

- Commune
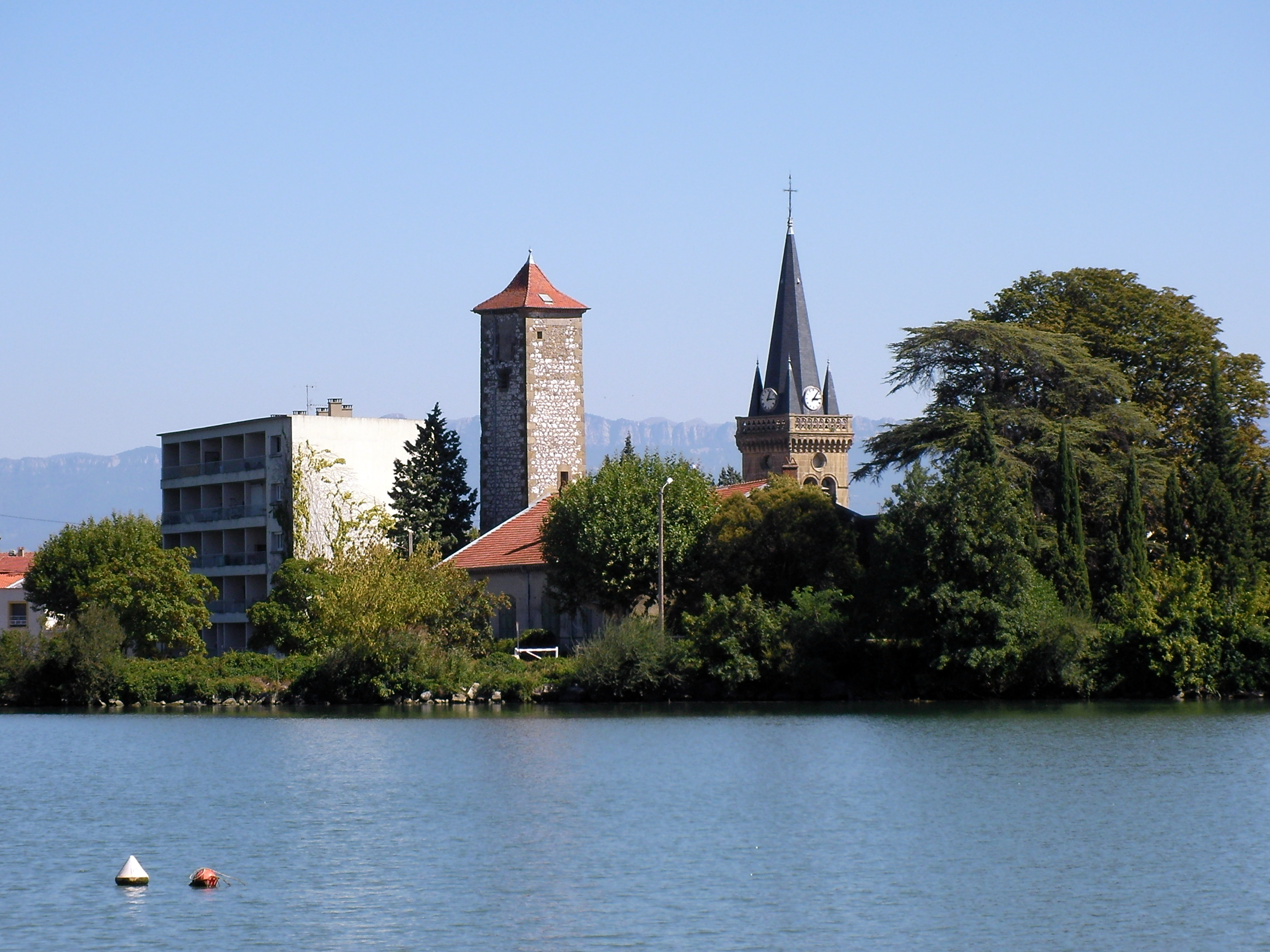
- The village seen from Glun

- Coat of arms
- Location of La Roche-de-Glun
- Location within France Location within Auvergne-Rhône-Alpes
- Coordinates: 45°00′46″N 4°50′54″E
- Country: France
- Region: Auvergne-Rhône-Alpes
- Department: Drôme
- Arrondissement: Valence
- Canton: Tain-l'Hermitage
- Intercommunality: CA Arche Agglo

Government
  - Mayor (2020–2026): Michel Gounon
- Area^{1}: 12.79 km^{2} (4.94 sq mi)
- Elevation: 119 m (390 ft)
- Highest elevation: 147 m (482 ft)
- Lowest elevation: 103 m (338 ft)
- Population (2023): 3,569
  - Density: 279.0/km^{2} (722.7/sq mi)
- Time zone: UTC+01:00 (CET)
  - Summer (DST): UTC+02:00 (CEST)
- INSEE/Postal code: 26271 /26600
- ^{1} French Land Register data, which excludes lakes, ponds, glaciers > 1 km^{2} (0.386 sq mi or 247 acres) and river estuaries.

La Roche-de-Glun (French pronunciation: [la ʁɔʃ də ɡlœ̃]; Occitan: La Ròcha de Glun) is a commune in the Drôme department in southeastern France. It lies on the left bank of the Rhône, opposite the village Glun (Ardèche department).

== Population ==
Historical population
Year	Pop.	±% p.a.
1968	1,227	—
1975	1,467	+2.58%
1982	2,113	+5.35%
1990	2,800	+3.58%
1999	2,740	−0.24%
2007	3,139	+1.71%
2012	3,161	+0.14%
2017	3,272	+0.69%
2023	3,569	+1.46%
Source: INSEE

== See also ==
- Communes of the Drôme department
