= Beaumont-Monteux =

- Commune
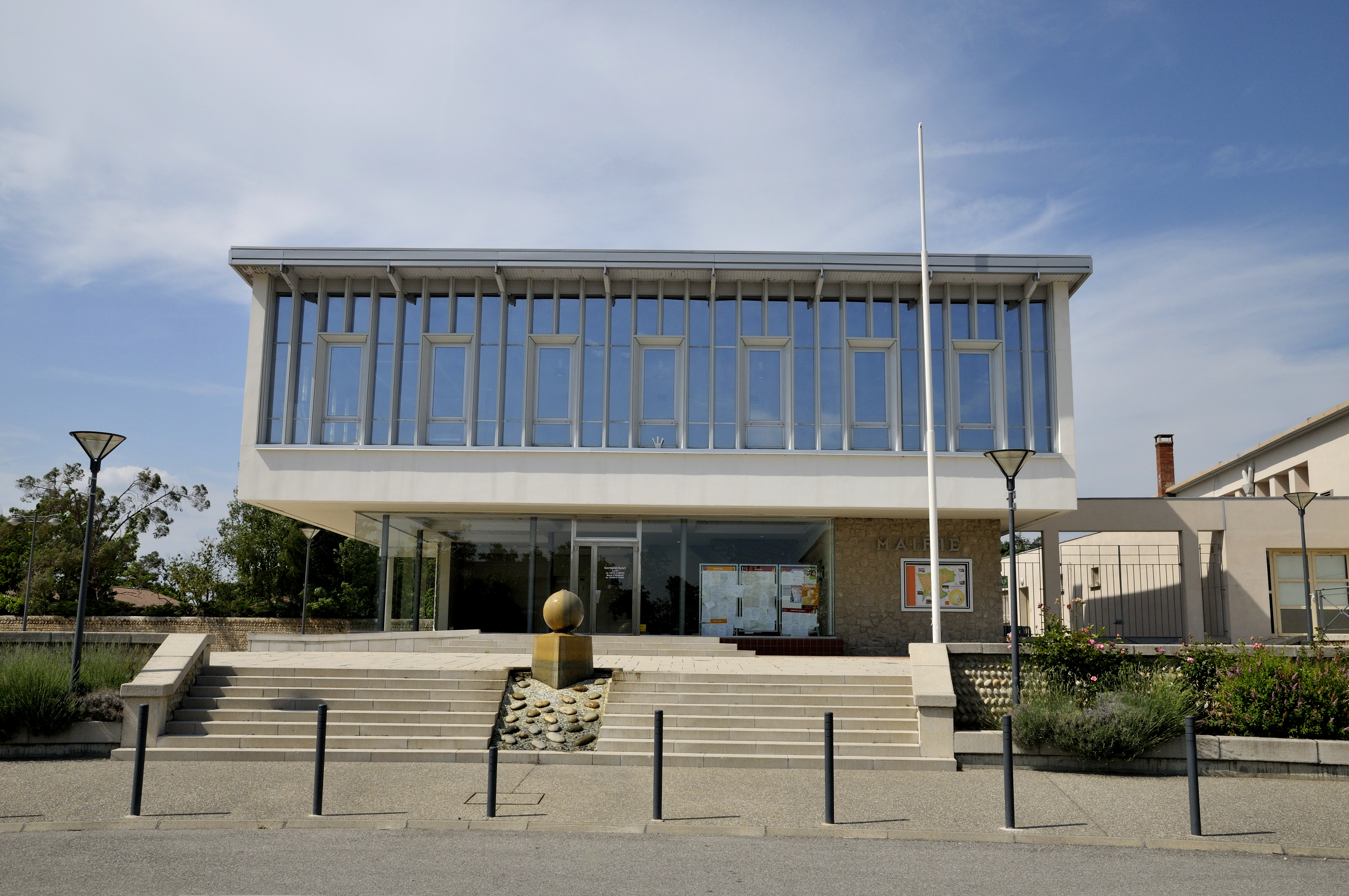
- Town hall
- Location of Beaumont-Monteux
- Location within France Location within Auvergne-Rhône-Alpes
- Coordinates: 45°01′15″N 4°55′16″E
- Country: France
- Region: Auvergne-Rhône-Alpes
- Department: Drôme
- Arrondissement: Valence
- Canton: Tain-l'Hermitage
- Intercommunality: CA Arche Agglo

Government
  - Mayor (2020–2026): Bruno Sénéclauze
- Area^{1}: 13.37 km^{2} (5.16 sq mi)
- Elevation: 120 m (390 ft)
- Highest elevation: 160 m (520 ft)
- Lowest elevation: 108 m (354 ft)
- Population (2023): 1,394
  - Density: 104.3/km^{2} (270.0/sq mi)
- Time zone: UTC+01:00 (CET)
  - Summer (DST): UTC+02:00 (CEST)
- INSEE/Postal code: 26038 /26600
- ^{1} French Land Register data, which excludes lakes, ponds, glaciers > 1 km^{2} (0.386 sq mi or 247 acres) and river estuaries.

Beaumont-Monteux (French pronunciation: [bomɔ̃ mɔ̃tø]; Occitan: Bèlmont e Montèls) is a commune in the Drôme department in southeastern France.

== Population ==
Historical population
Year	Pop.	±% p.a.
1968	582	—
1975	603	+0.51%
1982	743	+3.03%
1990	888	+2.25%
1999	936	+0.59%
2007	1,010	+0.96%
2012	1,115	+2.00%
2017	1,317	+3.39%
2023	1,394	+0.95%
Source: INSEE

== See also ==
- Communes of the Drôme department
