= Gabriel Faure (writer) =

French poet, novelist and essayist

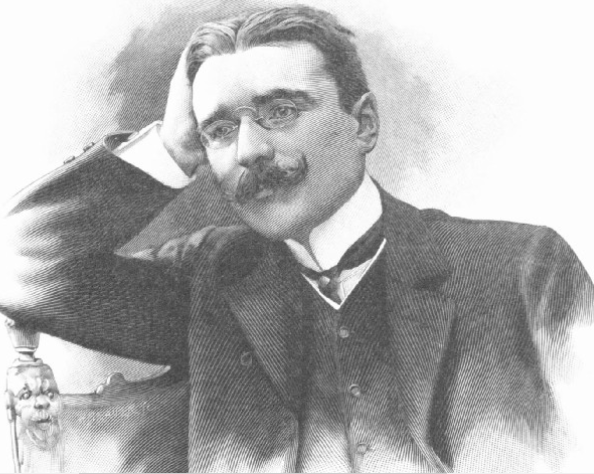
- Born: Gabriel Henri Louis Auguste Faure; 15 May 1877; Tournon-sur-Rhône, France
- Died: 5 August 1962 (aged 85); Ors, France
- Occupations: Poet, novelist, essayist
- Awards: Grand Prix de Littérature, Académie française, 1941

Gabriel Henri Louis Auguste Faure (French: [ɡabʁijɛl fɔʁ]; 15 May 1877 – 5 August 1962) was a French poet, novelist and essayist. He was the author of many books about Italy. He won five prizes from the Académie française, including the Grand Prix de Littérature for the entirety of his work.

== Early life ==
Gabriel Faure was born on 15 May 1877 in Tournon-sur-Rhône, in the department of Ardèche, France, where his father held the dual positions of lawyer and mayor. Although he owed his love of literature to his grandfather, who introduced him to Latin and Romantic poets, it was at the Tournon high school that bears his name that a literature teacher, Joseph Parnin, revealed to him beauty, art, and poetry. His law studies, begun in Lyon and completed in Paris, led to his doctorate in 1900, but his travels in Italy, and Florence in particular, determined his literary future.

== Career ==
Faure was the author of many poems, novels and essays. An Italophile, he wrote many books about Italy, including Venice, Ventimiglia and Rome. In 1929, he edited an illustrated anthology, Le Visage de l'Italie, prefaced by Benito Mussolini. A review in The Journal of Roman Studies noted that "the Introduction bv the Duce makes clear, what comes now and again to the surface in the text itself, that the book is not concerned only with the beauties of Italian scenery and the wonders of Italian architecture, but also with the great political past—and present—of Italy. Nevertheless, there is little to disturb those who prefer to keep their politics and their aesthetic appreciations apart."

He wrote some of his works in Italy, and stayed several times in Breganze as the guest of Marie Jsoard Savardo at Villa Savardo. Extant are some postcards he sent in 1924 and 1928 from Breganze to France.

In 1926, Faure founded the Comité France-Italie, intended to enhance and celebrate French-Italian cultural relations. The group was reorganized in 1929 by the pro-Fascist French writer Jean Rivain, and gained popularity and prestige in the early 1930s under the leadership of Pierre de Nolhac.

Faure also wrote several books about French authors including François-René de Chateaubriand, Jean-Jacques Rousseau, Stendhal, Paul Valéry and Louis Le Cardonnel. He co-authored a book about Napoleon with Marcel Deléon.

== Prizes from the Académie française ==
Faure won five prizes from the Académie française:

- Prix Montyon for Heures d'Ombrie, 1908
- Prix Jules Davaine for Sur la vie Emilia, 1911
- Prix Marcelin Guérin for Paysages littéraires, 1918
- Prix Alfred Née, 1930
- Grand Prix de Littérature for the entirety of his work in 1941

== Death and legacy ==
Faure died on 5 August 1962. In 1967, the Lycée Gabriel Faure in Tournon-sur-Rhône was named in his honor. In 2013, his name was given to a street in Saint-Pierre-de-Manneville in Seine-Maritime.

== Works ==
- Faure, Gabriel (1898). Berthe de Provence, duchesse d'Arles. Paris: Bibliothèque de l'association. OCLC 79012040.
- Faure, Gabriel (1908). Heures d'Ombrie. Paris: Sansot. OCLC 697781125.
- Faure, Gabriel (1911). Heure d'Italie. Paris: Sansot. OCLC 559736203.
- Faure, Gabriel (1911). Sur la Via Emilia. Paris: E. Sansot. OCLC 28364811.
- Faure, Gabriel (1915). Pâques dauphinoises. Valence: imprimerie de Jules César. OCLC 800415620.
- Faure, Gabriel (1916). Au pays de Saint François d'Assise. Grenoble: J. Rey. OCLC 491136565.
- Faure, Gabriel (1916). Paysages de guerre : champs de bataille de France et d'Italie. Paris: Perrin. OCLC 15729893.
- Faure, Gabriel (1917). Paysages littéraires. Paris: Éditions Fasquelle. OCLC 10648696.
- Faure, Gabriel (1918). Au pays de sainte Catherine de Sienne. Grenoble: J. Rey. OCLC 9435948.
- Faure, Gabriel (1919). L'Amour sous les lauriers roses. Paris: Éditions Fasquelle. OCLC 459498057.
- Faure, Gabriel (1919). Sur la terrasse de Valence : rèverie d'un soir d'été. Valence: Imprimerie de Jules César. OCLC 459498898.
- Faure, Gabriel (1919). La couronne de Venise. Paris: Edition de Boccard. OCLC 422226206.
- Faure, Gabriel (1920). Les amants enchaînés. Paris: Éditions Fasquelle. OCLC 583336313.
- Faure, Gabriel (1920). Pèlerinages dauphinois : au pays de Bayart. Grenoble. OCLC 68643744.
- Faure, Gabriel (1920). Chateaubriand et l'Occitanienne. Paris: L. Carteret. OCLC 697610159.
- Faure, Gabriel (1920). Pèlerinages d'italie. Paris: Perrin et Cie. OCLC 222592180.
- Faure, Gabriel (1921). Paysages passionnés. Paris: Perrin & cie. OCLC 23405743.
- Faure, Gabriel (1921). Mon lycée : Rêverie d'un matin d'octobre. Saint-Félicien-en-Vivarais: Pigeonnier. OCLC 45167879.
- Faure, Gabriel (1921). Les amours de Chateaubriand et de Madame de Vichet. Félicien-en-Vivarais: Pigeonnier. OCLC 19683598.
- Faure, Gabriel (1922). La dernière journée de Sappho. Paris: Éditions Fasquelle. OCLC 28475703.
- Faure, Gabriel (1922). Printemps... Paris: R. Chiberre. OCLC 459498780.
- Faure, Gabriel (1922). Pèlerinages passionnés : âmes et décors romantiques. Paris: Éditions Fasquelle. OCLC 2795770.
- Faure, Gabriel (1922). Aux lacs italiens. Côme--Majeur--Lugano--Orta--Varèse--Iseo--Garde. Grenoble: J. Rey. OCLC 3427041.
- Faure, Gabriel (1923). La vallée du Rhône. Paris: Éditions Fasquelle. OCLC 3230098.
- Faure, Gabriel (1923). Jean-Jacques Rousseau en Dauphiné, 1768-1770. Grenoble: Editions J. Rey. OCLC 4624940.
- Faure, Gabriel (1925). Âmes et décors romanesques. Paris: Bibliothèque-Charpentier. OCLC 6887831.
- Faure, Gabriel (1925). Pages lyriques. Paris: Au pigeonnier Saint-Félicien-en-Vivarais. OCLC 7378423.
- Faure, Gabriel (1926). Le Bel Été. Editions Fasquelle. OCLC 6951243.
- Faure, Gabriel (1926). Villes d'art de l'Italie du Nord; Milan, Bergame, Brescia, Vérone, Vicence, Bassano. Grenoble: Arthaud. OCLC 40611507.
- Faure, Gabriel (1927). Les Alpes françaises. Paris: Horizons de France. OCLC 25973306.
- Faure, Gabriel (1927). Amours romantiques. Paris: Editions Fasquelle. OCLC 1413185.
- Faure, Gabriel (1927). Aux pays des peintres italiens. Paris: Editions Broccard. OCLC 25973357.
- Faure, Gabriel (1928). Heures romanesques. Paris: Bibliothèque Charpentier. OCLC 15192568.
- Faure, Gabriel (1928). Au Ventoux avec Pétrarque. Avignon: Aubanel Frères. OCLC 370691077.
- Faure, Gabriel (1929). Au pays de Stendhal. Grenoble: J. Rey. OCLC 5898786.
- Faure, Gabriel (1929). Les Rencontres italiennes. Paris: Éditions des horizons de France. OCLC 7356607.
- Faure, Gabriel (1929). Suite italienne. Paris: Charpentier. OCLC 21138555.
- Deléon, Marcel; Faure, Gabriel (1929). Napoléon à Laffrey. Grenoble: F. Dardelet. OCLC 7231165.
- Faure, Gabriel (1930). Au pays de Virgile. Paris: Charpentier. OCLC 9626848.
- Faure, Gabriel (1930). Paysages et poètes d'Italie. Roma: Società editrice di Novissima. OCLC 459498621.
- Faure, Gabriel (1931). Stendhal, compagnon d'Italie. Paris: Editions Fasquelle. OCLC 1613113.
- Faure, Gabriel (1932). Sur les routes de Bohême. Paris: Editions Fasquelle. OCLC 48655986.
- Faure, Gabriel (1933). En Vénéto. Roma: Novissima. OCLC 25973406.
- Faure, Gabriel (1933). Les Rendez-vous italiens. Paris: Charpentier. OCLC 13380772.
- Faure, Gabriel (1934). Au pays de Gabriele d'Annunzio. Rome. OCLC 559736010.
- Faure, Gabriel (1936). Tournon. Paris: Maison du livre français. OCLC 468055204.
- Faure, Gabriel (1938). Rome. Paris: Flammarion. OCLC 25973562.
- Faure, Gabriel (1938). Venise. Paris: Arthaud. OCLC 11321679.
- Faure, Gabriel (1941). Aux bords du Rhone. Paris: Arthaud. OCLC 299530999.
- Faure, Gabriel (1942). Mes alyscamps; maîtres et amis disparus. Paris: Chez J. Haumont. OCLC 7356600.
- Faure, Gabriel (1943). Louis Le Cardonnel à San Remo. Paris: Arthaud. OCLC 25263647.
- Faure, Gabriel (1944). Chateaubriand, Dubois et le Globe. Paris: Arthaud. OCLC 369459339.
- Faure, Gabriel (1945). Paysages, mes amours : souvenirs d'un écrivain. Paris: Horizons de France. OCLC 32422400.
- Faure, Gabriel (1945). Gabriel Fauré. Grenoble: Arthaud. OCLC 5904595.
- Faure, Gabriel (1946). Le rossignol de Pérouse, contes de France et d'Italie. Paris: Éditions des Deux-Rives. OCLC 14191529.
- Faure, Gabriel (1946). Heures d'hiver. Paris: Editions Fasquelle. OCLC 491136653.
- Faure, Gabriel (1946). Promenades latines. Paris: Editions Fasquelle. OCLC 45167970.
- Faure, Gabriel (1946). Essais sur Chateaubriand. Paris: Arthaud. OCLC 2010324.
- Faure, Gabriel (1946). Mallarmé à Tournon. Paris: Les Horizons de France. OCLC 23404080.
- Faure, Gabriel (1948). Essais sur J.-J. Rousseau. Paris: Arthaud. OCLC 5261323.
- Faure, Gabriel (1950). L'Itinéraire italien. Paris: Les Horizons de France. OCLC 459498507.
- Faure, Gabriel (1953). Flâneries. Paris: Les Horizons de France. OCLC 491396139.
- Faure, Gabriel (1954). Paul Valéry méditerranéen. Paris: Les Horizons de France. OCLC 2125150.
- Faure, Gabriel (1956). Le vieillard de Tarente, suivi des Délices de juin. Paris: Les Horizons de France. OCLC 18964294.
- Faure, Gabriel (1956). La Riviera, de Vintimille à Pise. Paris: Arthaud. OCLC 6243807.
- Faure, Gabriel (1959). Les jardins de Rome. Paris: Arthaud. OCLC 3104656.
- Faure, Gabriel (1961). Italiam. Paris: Arthaud. OCLC 24856337.
- Faure, Gabriel (1963). Diptyque romain. Paris: Arthaud. OCLC 1740291.

=== In English translation ===
Works by Gabriel Faure translated into English include Wanderings in Italy (1919), Pilgrimages in Italy (1920), The Banks of the Rhône from Lyons to Arles (1922), The Gardens of Rome (1924), The Italian Lakes: Maggiore, Como, Orta, Varese, Lugano, Iseo, Garda (1925), The Land of St. Francis of Assisi: Assisi and Perugia (1925), The Dolomites (1925), Rome (1926), and Sicily (1932).
