= Bapst =

Bapst is a surname. Notable people with the surname include:

- Germain Bapst (1853–1921), French jeweler and historian
- Jacques-Evrard Bapst (1771–1842), French jeweler
- Jeanine Bapst (born 1968), Swiss ski mountaineer
- John Bapst (1815–1887), Swiss Jesuit missionary and educator
  - Bapst Library, a Boston College library

== See also ==
- Pabst
