= Jean Meyer (historian, 1924) =

French historian (1924–2022)

- Born: 11 November 1924; Strasbourg, France
- Died: 18 April 2022 (aged 97)
- Education: University of Rennes
- Occupation: Historian
- Awards: Officer of the French Order of Academic Palms; CNRS bronze medal (1966); Officer of the National Order of Merit (1991)

Jean Meyer (11 November 1924 – 18 April 2022) was a French historian who specialised in naval and maritime topics.

== Biography ==
Meyer taught history and geography at high schools in Nantes from 1953 to 1962, before becoming a professor at the University of Rennes from 1963 to 1978. He then became an emeritus at Paris Sorbonne-Paris IV and doctor honoris causa of the University of Marburg. He was director of the Laboratoire d'histoire et d'archéologie maritime, the CNRS research unit devoted to maritime history. Meyer died on 18 April 2022, at the age of 97.

== Works ==
- Meyer, Jean (1973). Noblesses et pouvoirs dans l'Europe d'Ancien régime. Paris: Hachette. OCLC 441811396., Prix Albéric-Rocheron from the Académie Française in 1974.
- Meyer, Jean (1975). La Bataille de Dunkerque, 10 mai-4 juin 1940 et la tragédie du Sirocco. Clermont-Ferrand: Synhélios. OCLC 904466057.
- Meyer, Jean (1977). Histoire de Nantes. Toulouse: Privat.
- Meyer, Jean (1979). La vie quotidienne en France au temps de la Régence. Paris: Hachette. OCLC 892288792., Prix Eugène-Piccard from the Académie Française.
- Meyer, Jean (1981). Les Capitalismes. Paris: Presses universitaires de France. ISBN 9782130368380.
- Meyer, Jean (1981). Colbert. Paris: Hachette. ISBN 9782010056741., Prix Thérouanne from the Académie Française in 1982.
- Meyer, Jean (1985). Histoire de Rennes. Toulouse: Privat. ISBN 9782708947504.
- Meyer, Jean (1985). Le Régent. Paris: Ramsay. ISBN 9782859564049. Prix Thiers from the Académie Française.
- Meyer, Jean (1985). La France moderne (de 1515 à 1789). Paris: Fayard. ISBN 9782213014883.
- Meyer, Jean (1986). Esclaves et Négriers. Paris: Gallimard. ISBN 9782070530182.
- Meyer, Jean (1988) [1966]. La Noblesse bretonne au XVIIIe siècle. Paris: SEVPEN. OCLC 36029969.
- Meyer, Jean (1989). L'Europe des Lumières. Horvath: Éditions du Coteau. ISBN 9782717105889.
- Meyer, Jean (1989). 1638, La Naissance de Louis XIV. Complexe. ISBN 978-2-87027-303-6.
- Meyer, Jean; Acerra, Martine (1990). L'Empire des mers, des galions aux clippers. Paris: Nathan. ISBN 9782826401001.
- Meyer, Jean; Béranger (1993). La France dans le monde au XVIIIe siècle. éditions Sedes. ISBN 9782718138145.
- Meyer, Jean (1993). Bossuet. Paris: Plon. ISBN 9782914352581. Grand prix Gobert from the Académie Française in 1994.
- Meyer, Jean; Moreau, Jean-Pierre (1994). Un flibustier français dans la mer des Antilles. 1618-1620. Paris: Payot. ISBN 978-2228888172.
- Meyer, Jean; Acerra, Martine (1994). Histoire de la marine française. Rennes: Ouest-France. ISBN 2-7373-1129-2.
- Meyer, Jean; Acerra, Martine (1995). État, Marine et Société. Paris: Presses de l'Université de Paris-Sorbonne. ISBN 9782840500483.
- Meyer, Jean; Acerra, Martine; Merino, José (1998). Les Marines de guerre européennes : XVIIe-XVIIIe siècles. Paris: Presses Paris Sorbonne. ISBN 9782840500971.
- Meyer, Jean (1999) [1969]. L'armement nantais dans la deuxième moitié du XVIIIe siècle. Paris: EHESS. ISBN 9782713212819.
- Meyer, Jean (2003). Louis XV ou le scepticisme politique. Sicre Editions. ISBN 9782914352581.

== Notes, citations, and references ==
Notes

Citations

References

- "Meyer, Jean, 1924-". Library of Congress.
