= Germain Bapst =

French jeweler, art collector, and art historian (1853-1921)

- Born: Germain Bapst; 20 December 1853; Paris, France
- Died: 9 December 1921 (aged 67); Paris, France
- Known for: Jewelry making, Art collecting
- Spouse: Henriquette Sophia Maria de Laski
- Parents: Paul-Alfred Bapst (father); Philiberte Villain-Fremyn (mother)
- Awards: Prix Marcelin Guérin (1887); Prix Thérouanne (1889); Legion of Honour (1889); Prix Thiers (1895)

Germain Bapst (20 December 1853 – 9 December 1921) was a French jeweler, art collector, and art historian based in France who partnered with Lucien Falize to form Bapst & Falize.

== Early life and education ==
Germain Bapst was born on 20 December 1853 in Paris, France.

Germain was a descendant of the prestigious Maison Bapst, a family revered for their contributions as jewelers to the French court in Paris. Originally from the Swabia region of Southern Germany, the Bapst family migrated to France, where they became well known. His family lineage, through his father, grandfather, and great-grandfather Jacques-Evrard Bapst, had been linked to the French Crown Jewels for a century and a half. Paul-Alfred Bapst, the father of Germain, served as the last crown jeweler during the Second French Empire. Germain's brother, Étienne André Bapst, pursued a career that led him to become a French military general. In 1878, both men were elected as members of the Board of Directors of the Société de l'histoire de France. He joined the Société de l'histoire de Paris et de l'Île-de-France in 1879 and was later elected to its board of directors, where he served up to 1895.

== Jewelry career ==
Following his father's death, in 1880, Germain Bapst partnered in the jewelry trade with the Parisian jeweler Lucien Falize, a son of a goldsmith, to form Bapst & Falize. The firm was known for creating jewelry, timepieces, enamelwork, and various other jeweled items, operating from their shops and workshops on rue d'Antin in Paris.

His firm, Bapst & Falize, exhibited at the 1889 Paris Exposition in October 1889, showcasing various pieces in the French jewelry section.

Germain's business partnership with Lucien Falize came to an end in 1892.

== Historian ==
Germain Bapst became an avid writer, art collector, art critic, and an expert in gemstone history. By the early 1880s, Bapst was serving on the administrative council of the Union Centrale des Arts Décoratifs (now Les Arts décoratifs), assisting with its museum and exhibition of decorative arts commission. While serving on the organizing committee of the 1880 Exhibition on Metal Industries, he saw interesting pewter objects but found little information on Renaissance pewter art beyond François Briot. He pursued in-depth research and began to patiently reconstruct the history of French pewter.

Representing the Union Centrale des Arts Décoratifs in 1882, he traveled through Bavaria, Saxony, Hungary, Austria, and Bohemia to engage with museum and art industry leaders. His observations provided practical insights into museum classification, display strategies, and the construction of new art spaces. He praised Hungary for its authenticity and criticized Vienna's disorganized museums. Bapst served as a delegated council member for the foreign section of the 7th Exposition de L'Union Centrale des Arts Décoratifs, held at the Palais de Champs-Élysées in August 1882. In the following year, he published an exhibition catalogue titled "The Arts of Wood, Fabrics, and Paper", highlighting key exhibits from the 1882 Exhibition.

In 1883, Bapst published an inventory of Maria Josepha of Saxony, Dauphine of France's jewelry titled "Inventaire de Marie-Josèphe de Saxe, dauphine de France". Bapst's work, "Metals in Antiquity and the Middle Ages: Tin", was released in 1884.

On 4 February 1885, Bapst was elected as a resident member of the Société des Antiquaires de France. During that year, he was accepted into the Society of French Bibliophiles as well as the Society for the History of French Art. He contributed to French art historian Eugène Müntz's "Les Artistes Célèbres" in 1886.

He published "Studies on French Goldsmithing in the 18th Century: The Germain, Goldsmiths-Sculptors of the King" in 1887. He dedicated the work to French bibliographer Jérôme Pichon. Bapst chronicled the legacy of the Germain family, detailing their rise through generations as they perfected the art of goldsmithing. The narrative follows the creation of a piece, from its design to its display in noble courts, and lastly, where the pieces were found at the time of its publication. The work was decorated with more than 100 engravings and was recognized by the French Academy.

In 1889, he released the "History of the Crown Jewels of France". With inspiration from his family's historical documents and state archives, Bapst planned to write an extensive account of the French crown jewels, covering their assembly by Francis I of France in 1530 right through to their partial sale by the state in the 19th century. The book was supported with 50 detailed engravings. Bapst also published a work in 1892 titled "French Goldsmithing at the Court of Portugal in the 18th century".

He became director of the French periodical La Revue contemporaine from 1892 to 1893. By that time, he was serving as a member of the Board of Directors of the Union Centrale des Arts Décoratifs. He was also a part of the organizing committee for the Fine Arts section of the 1892 Exhibition of Women's Arts (French: Exposition des Arts de la Femme).

Bapst was involved in the 1895 Historical and Military Exhibition of the Revolution and the Empire, writing the preface for the exhibition catalogue. He eventually curated an attraction for the Paris Exhibition of 1900, dedicated to the military history of land and naval forces. This was segmented into an art section with paintings and busts, and a historical section featuring flags, weapons, uniforms, and other military equipment. For the Irish International Exhibition of 1907, he lent two volumes of the "Works of M. Viscount De Chateaubriand". They had been in Napoleon's possession while in exile at St. Helena. Along with the volumes, various Napoleonic relics, including portraits, engravings, and prints, were exhibited.

== Personal life ==
On 5 July 1888, he married Brazilian-born Enriqueta "Queta" de Laski. They had a child named André Manuela Alexandre Joaquina Bapst. After their divorce, she later married Jacques de Gunzburg then Prince Basil Narischkine.

== Death ==
Germain Bapst died on 9 December 1921 in Paris, France. He was buried in a family burial plot at Père Lachaise Cemetery.

== Awards and honors ==
- Prix Marcelin Guérin (1887)
- Prix Thérouanne (1889)
- Legion of Honour (1889)
- Prix Thiers (1895)

== Works ==
- The Retrospective Museum of Metal at the Central Union of Fine Arts (Le Musée rétrospectif du métal à l de l Union centrale des beaux arts) (1881)
- Two Fans from the Louvre Museum (Deux éven tails au Musée du Louvre) (1882)
- Inventory of Marie-Josephe de Saxe (1883)
- The Arts of Wood , Fabrics and Paper (Les Arts du Bois, des tissus et du papier) (1883)
- Metals in Antiquity and the Middle Ages: Tin (Les métaux dans l'antiquité et au Moyen Age: l'étain) (1884)
- Will of King John the Good and Inventory of His Jewels in London (1884)
- Studies on Phoenician Bowls (Étude sur les coupes phéniciennes) (1885)
- Studies on French Goldwork in the 18th Century: The Germain, Goldsmiths-Sculptors of the King (1887)
- The Excavations of Siverskaia (Caucasus) (1887)
- History of the Crown Jewels of France (Histoire des joyaux de la couronne de France) (1889)
- Essay on the History of Panoramas and Dioramas (Essai sur l'histoire des panoramas et des dioramas) (1891)
- The Siege of Huningue 1815 (Le siège d Huningue) (1892)
- Histoire d'un cabinet minéralogique (1892)
- Study on Medieval Mystery Plays (Etude sur les mystères au Moyen âge) (1892)
- French Goldsmithing at the Court of Portugal in the 18th century (L'orfèvrerie française à la cour de Portugal au XVIIIe siècle) (1892)
- The Early Years of Marshal Mac-Mahon (Les Premières années du maréchal de Mac-Mahon) (1894)
- Marshal Canrobert (Le maréchal Canrobert: 1809-1851) (1899)

== Gallery ==
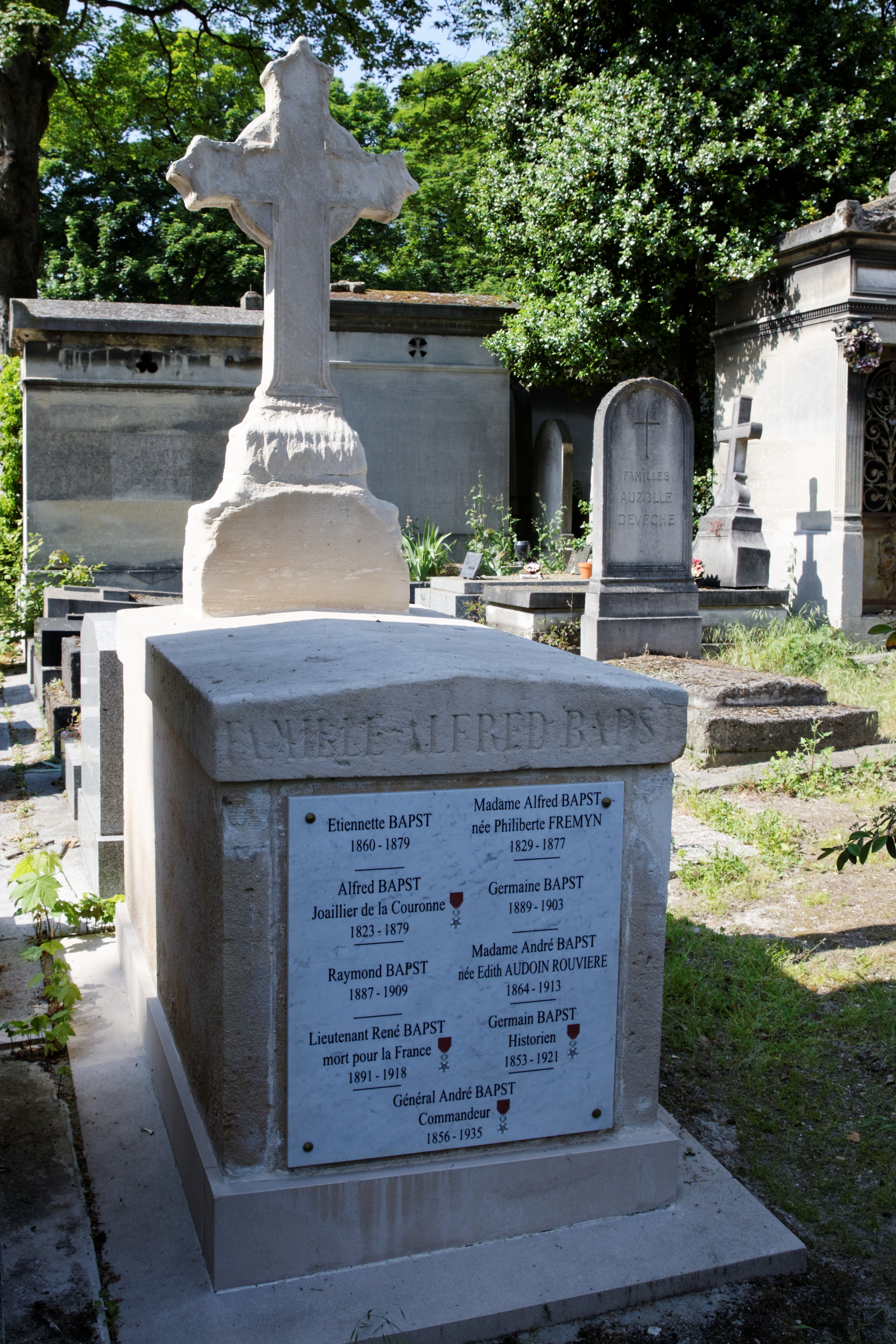
Grave of Bapst, Père Lachaise Cemetery
