= Prix Jeanne Scialtel =

The prix Jeanne-Scialtel is a former prize awarded by the Académie française for literary translation into French. It was established in 1968 and awarded triennially from 1969 to 1987. In 1994, the Prix Jeanne-Scialtel, the Prix Langlois, and the Prix Pouchard were merged into the Prix Jules Janin, named after Jules Janin.

== Laureates ==
- 1969 : Marcelle Sibon for all of his work in translation.
- 1972 : Marthe Robert for the translation of the complete works of Kafka.
- 1975 : Armel Guerne for translation of the complete works of Novalis.
- 1978 : Hervé Belkiri-Deluen and Maurice-Edgar Coindreau for Tourbillon, the translation of Follow Me Down by Shelby Foote.
- 1981 :
  - Jean Vauthier for the translation of Othello, by Shakespeare.
  - Jean-Georges Ritz for translation of the poems of Gerard Manley Hopkins.
- 1984 : Patrick Reumaux for translations of Dylan Thomas, Steinbeck, Flann O’Brien.
- 1987 : Maurice Rambaud for all of his translations.
