= Émile Vernier =

Émile Vernier may refer to:

- Émile Louis Vernier (29 November 1829 – 24 May 1887), French painter and lithographer
- Émile Séraphin Vernier (16 October 1852 – 9 September 1927), French sculptor, metal worker, engraver and medalist
