= Bapst & Falize =

Former jewelry firm in Paris, France

- Company type: Jewelry House
- Industry: Luxury goods
- Predecessor: Maison Bapst
- Founded: 1880
- Founder: Lucien Falize; Germain Bapst
- Defunct: 1892
- Headquarters: Paris, France
- Key people: Émile Séraphin Vernier
- Products: Jewelry, Enamelwork

Bapst & Falize (French: Bapst et Falize) was a French jewelry firm based in Paris, France.

== History ==
Bapst & Falize, representing the partnership of Germain Bapst and Lucien Falize, was based out of Paris in the late 19th century within the French Third Republic. The stores and workshops of the firm were situated at No. 6 rue d'Antin.

Lucien Falize inherited the family business from his father, Alexis Falize, who was renowned for his skill and artistry in precious metals, earning a grand prize at the 1878 Paris Exposition. By 1880, the Parisian jeweler Falize had partnered with Germain Bapst, a member of a lineage renowned for their roles as French court jewelers and an expert in gemstone history.

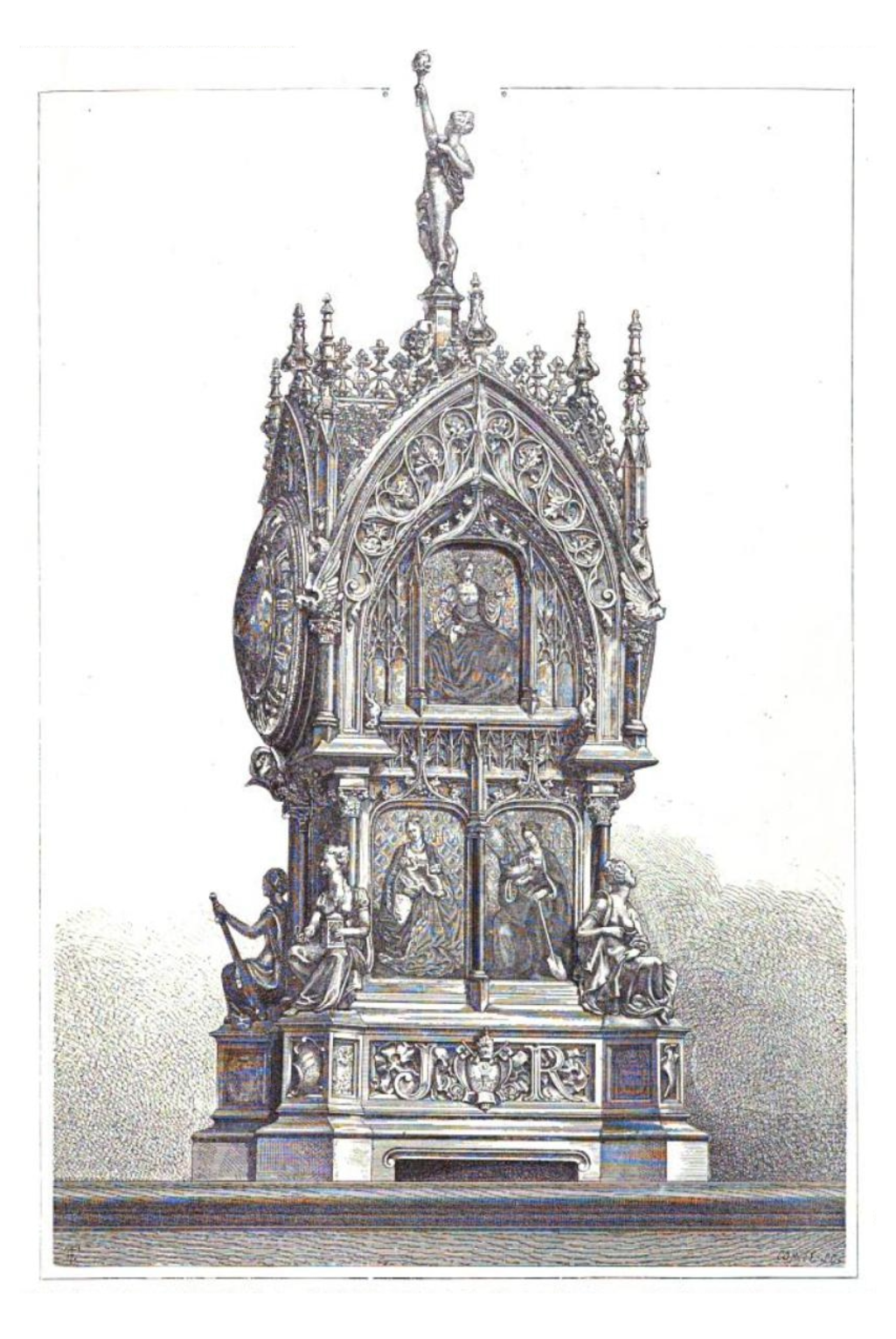
Silver and Gold Clock by Bapst & Falize, Model by Léon Chédeville

Shortly after, Lucien from Bapst & Falize, in collaboration with Léon Chédeville, designed a clock and a jewel modeled after a late Gothic tower. The piece was adorned with gold sculptures crafted by Chédeville and detailed with enamel plaques. It was executed by the firm for English collector Alfred Morrison. The structural elements were made of silver, with figures in gold. The enamels used were translucent and depicted Church, Prayer, Law, Labour, Faith, and Charity. One dial displayed the hours, while the other was decorated with cloisonné. The corners featured figures symbolizing Fortitude, Prudence, Justice, and Temperance.

By 1885, the company started securing patents at the National Office of Industrial Property for its innovations, encompassing various devices. On the 5th of December 1885, they applied for a patent to utilize elastic, metallic, or similarly flat or stamped plates for signal, alert, or call functions. They invented an improved time alarm for watches and clocks, which received a Bapst & Falize patent in France in 1885 and in Belgium and Great Britain in 1886. Their 1886 application for the patent in the United States was approved on 12 June 1888. On 7 December 1886, L. Falize and G. Bapst patented a design for a watchcase through the U.S. Patent Office.

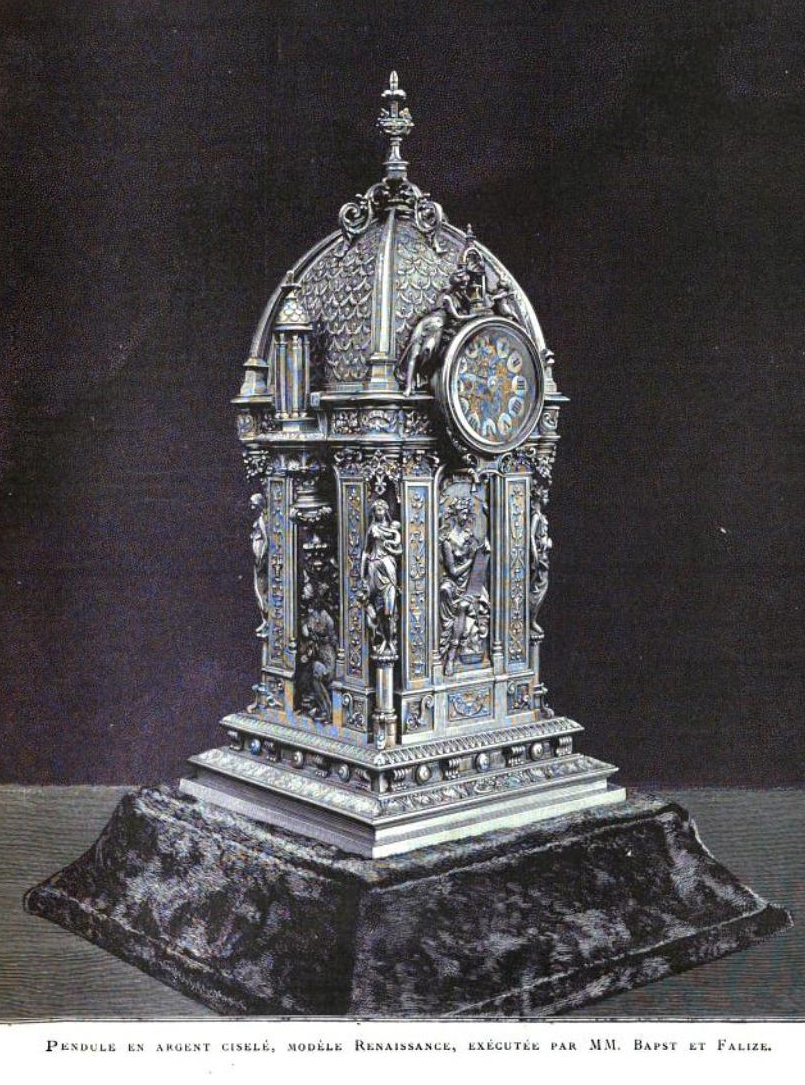
Chiseled Silver Clock, Renaissance Model, Executed by MM. Bapst & Falize

At the 1889 Paris Exposition Universelle, Bapst and Falize exhibited various pieces in the French jewelry section at the Champ de Mars. During this time period, the separate crafts of goldsmithing and jewelry making combined to become a singular industry. As documented by American mineralogist George F. Kunz, "In the French jeweler's section was exhibited what was perhaps the most remarkable collection of jewelry and precious stones ever shown at once." In the jewelry segment, the firm, along with Boucheron, Maison Vever, and Gustave Sandoz, was strategically placed at each corner of the section. Bapst & Falize showcased their jeweled pieces, which included replicas of pieces crafted a century earlier by their own firm. Among these, the elite jewelers presented the historic Sancy diamond, set in a style reminiscent of the 18th-century design commissioned during the era of Marie Leszczyńska.

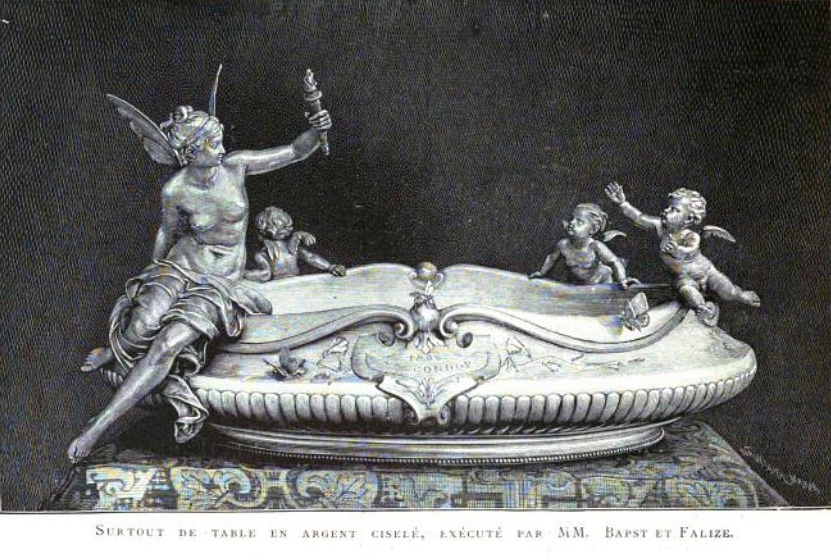
Chiseled Silver Table Centerpiece by Bapst & Falize

The 1889 Paris Exhibition also saw Bapst & Falize unveil a significant silver candelabra, specifically designed for Prince Demidoff. Additionally, their exhibit highlighted a chiseled silver table centerpiece, a chiseled silver Renaissance-style mantel clock, and "Urania", a pendulum made from carved ivory, enamelled gold, and silver.

Germain Bapst and Lucien Falize cordially terminated their joint venture around 1892.

In 1893, two works by Bapst & Falize were exhibited in Chicago at the World's Columbian Exposition of 1893 under its "Metal Gold Work" category. This included an oval silver Repoussé plate and a silver Repoussé bowl.

== See also ==
- Lucien Falize
