= Prix Verrière =

French literary award

The Prix Verrière was an annual prize awarded by the Académie française from 1935 to 1949 to support literary creations, with the intent of "promoting French influence abroad, particularly through the actions of catholic missionaries, encouraging their works of education, teaching and charity".

== Laureates ==
- 1935 :
  - Collège de la Salle de Buenos Aires
  - Mgr Émile Sauvant (vicaire apostolique de Bamako)
  - Sœurs de Saint-Joseph-de-l'Apparition
  - Sœurs de Saint-Vincent de Paul de Santorin
  - Union Missionnaire du Clergé
- 1936 :
  - Bénédictines de Madagascar
  - Bibliothèque Haïtienne des Frères de Port-au-Prince
  - Bibliothèque Sainte-Thérèse de l'Enfant Jésus à Alep
  - André Dupeyrat for his work on Papouasie
  - R.P. Hilaire for works of siamese education
  - R.P. Victor Hostachy (1885-1967) for Une belle mission à Madagascar
  - Charles Lagier for L'Orient chrétien
  - R.P. Alphonse-Louis Mouly for Île de Pâques, île de mystère
  - R.P. René Piacentini (1882-1968) for Le Père Mell
- 1937 :
  - Aurore, Université catholique de Shangaï
  - R.P. Albert David
  - R.P. Roger Dussercle
  - Orphelinat Saint-Joseph de Beyrouth
  - The works of Sœurs de la Providence de Portieux
  - The Sisters of Saint-Vincent de Paul of Santorin
  - Religieuses Ursulines de Lutra à Tinos en Grèce
  - Gervais Quenard
- 1938 :
  - Ad Lucem
  - Hôpital Sainte-Marie de Changhaï
  - R.P. P. Jacquinot for the creation of neutral zones
  - The French Mission in Changhaï
  - Armenian Sisters of the Immaculate-Conception
  - Œuvre apostolique
- 1939 :
  - R.P. du Mas de Paysac (Curate of Tamatave, Madagascar)
  - Filles de la Charité de Bitolj (Yugoslavia)
  - The Superior of the Hôtel-Dieu de Québec
  - Maurice-Hyacinthe Lelong for Le Sahara aux cent visages
  - R.P. Yves Pichon for Daniel Brottier
- 1940 :
  - Jean-Romain Alléou
  - Gustave Charlier for Vue d'Amérique
  - R.P. Joseph Delore
  - Georges Doutrepont for Histoire illustrée de la langue française en Belgique
- 1941 :
  - M. Nguyen-Dac-Khé
  - M. Nguyen-Duc-Giang
  - M. Tran-Van-Trad
  - M. Tran-Van-Tung (1915-....) for Rêves d'un campagnard annamite
- 1948 : Louis Marchand
- 1949 : Marie-André du Sacré-Cœur (1899-1988) for Sous le ciel d’Afrique
