= Former prizes awarded by the Académie française =

This list of Former prizes awarded by the Académie française includes the Prix de l'Académie française which no longer exists (as of 2016).

== List of former prizes awarded by the Académie française ==
=== History ===
- Prix Albéric Rocheron
- Prix Antoine Girard
- Prix Augustin Thierry
- Prix Broquette-Gonin (history), created in 1950, last awarded in 1973.
- Prix Charles Blanc
- Prix Eugène Piccard
- Prix Feydeau de Brou
- Prix Georges Goyau
- Prix Hercule Catenacci
- Prix Jean Walter
- Prix Marie-Eugène Simon-Henri-Marin
- Prix Pierre Gentil
- Prix René Petiet
- Prix Thérouanne nominating laureates, every year from 1869 to 1989.
- Prix Toutain
- Prix Yvan Loiseau
- Prix d'Histoire
- Prix du Baron de Courcel
- Prix du Général Muteau

=== Literature ===
- Prix André Barré, biennial, created in 1954, last awarded in 1984
- Prix Alice-Louis Barthou, annual, created in 1936, last awarded in 1988
- Prix Louis Barthou, annual, created in 1936, last awarded in 1993
- Prix Max Barthou, annual, created in 1936, last awarded in 1988
- Prix Bordin, annual, created in 1935, last awarded in 1988
- Prix Botta, quadriennial, created in 1875, last awarded in 1985
- Prix Boudenoot, quinquennial, created in 1924, last awarded in 1985
- Prix Brieux, biennial, created in 1926, last awarded in 1989
- Prix Broquette-Gonin (literature), created in 1918, last awarded in 1989
- Prix Calmann-Levy, triennial, 1892, last awarded in 1987
- Prix Pol Comiant, triennial, created in 1956, last awarded in 1989
- Prix Dumas-Millier, annual, created in 1955, last awarded in 1988
- Prix Georges Dupau, annual, created in 1938, last awarded in 1989
- Prix Durchon-Louvet, annual, created in 1934, last awarded in 1988
- Prix Estrade-Delcros, quinquennial, created in 1896, last awarded in 1986
- Prix Jules Favre, biennial, created in 1886, last awarded in 1989
- Prix Paul Flat, annual, created in 1919, last awarded in 1989
- Prix Marcelin Guérin, annual, created in 1872, last awarded in 1976
- Prix André Jullien du Breuil, quinquennial, created in 1948, last awarded in 1986
- Prix Gustave Le Métais-Larivière, annual, created in 1947, last awarded in 1985
- Prix Maillé-Latour-Landry, biennial, created in 1839, last awarded in 1984
- Prix M. et Mme Louis Marin, triennial, created in 1976, last awarded in 1993.
- Prix Narcisse Michaut, biennial, created in 1892, last awarded in 1989
- Prix Alfred Née, annual, created in 1893, last awarded in 1988
- Prix Pouchard, annual, created in 1941, last awarded in 1983
- Prix Jean Reynaud, quinquennial, created in 1879, last awarded in 1979
- Prix Roberge, annual, created in 1919, last awarded in 1989
- Prix Saintour, annual, created in 1889, last awarded in 1989
- Prix Anaïs Ségalas, annual, created in 1917, last awarded in 1989
- Prix Sobrier-Arnould, annual, created in 1891, last awarded in 1984
- Prix Lucien Tisserant, annual, created in 1937, last awarded in 1989
- Prix Maurice Trubert, biennial, created in 1921, last awarded in 1982
- Prix Claire Virenque, annual, created in 1961, last awarded in 1987
- Prix Vitet, annual, created in 1873, last awarded in 1989
- Prix J.-J. Weiss, biennial, created in 1910, last awarded in 1988
- Prix Valentine de Wolmar, annual, created in 1960, last awarded in 1989

=== Philosophy ===
- Prix Auguste Furtado
- Prix Broquette-Gonin (philosophy), created in 1917, last awarded in 1963.
- Prix Constant Dauguet
- Prix Dodo
- Prix Fabien
- Prix Halphen
- Prix Henri Dumarest
- Prix Hélène Porgès
- Prix Juteau-Duvigneaux
- Prix Lafontaine
- Prix Louis-Paul Miller
- Prix Maujean
- Prix Nicolas Missarel
- Prix Paul Teissonière
- Prix Véga et Lods de Wegmann
- Prix de Joest
- Prix de Jouy
- Prix du Dr Binet-Sangle

=== Literature and philosophy ===
- Prix Lambert, established 1853, last awarded 1963

=== Poetry ===
- Prix Anthony Valabrègue
- Prix Archon-Despérouses
- Prix Auguste Capdeville
- Prix Balleroy
- Prix Broquette-Gonin (poetry), created in 1960, last awarded in 1979.
- Prix Capuran
- Prix Henry Jousselin
- Prix Jean Bouscatel
- Prix Kastner-Boursault
- Prix Le Fèvre-Deumier
- Prix Marie Havez-Planque
- Prix Pascal Forthuny
- Prix Paul Labbé-Vauquelin
- Prix René Bardet
- Prix Saint-Cricq-Theis
- Prix Émile Hinzelin

=== Support for literary creation ===
- Prix Aubry-Vitet
- Prix Bonardi
- Prix Lange
- Prix Pierre de Régnier
- Prix Verrière

=== Translation ===
- Prix Jeanne Scialtel
- Prix Langlois

=== Cinema ===
- Prix Jean-Le-Duc (1972–1993)

=== Institut de France ===
- Prix d'Aumale
