= Marcel Deléon =

French businessman and historian

- Born: 9 May 1894; Villard-de-Lans, Isère, France
- Died: 4 September 1967 (aged 73); Paris, France
- Occupation(s): Businessman, historian

Marcel Deléon (9 May 1894 – 4 September 1967) was a French businessman and historian. He won the Prix Marcelin Guérin from the Académie française for Le nid de l’aigle. Voyage à l'île d'Elbe in 1935.
