= Prix Juteau-Duvigneaux =

The Prix Juteau-Duvigneaux of the foundation of the same name, was an annual prize in philosophy awarded by the Académie française. Starting in 1896, it was awarded to the author or authors of works in Ethics, especially from the Catholic point of view.

== Laureates ==
=== From 1898 to 1919 ===
- 1898 :
  - Louis Énault for Le rachat d’une âme
  - Jacques de La Faye (1855?-1940?) for L’Irlande au XIXe siècle : O’Connell
  - Maurice Landrieux for Aux pays du Christ
  - Marie O'Kennedy for Inventaire de ma chambre
- 1899 :
  - Abbé Henri Boissonnot (1856-19..) for Le cardinal Meignan
  - Comtesse Roger de Courson (1849-1931) for Quatre portraits de femmes and La persécution des catholiques en Angleterre
  - Jean Guiraud for Saint-Dominique
  - Henri Joly for Psychologie des Saints
  - Joseph Lavergne (1859-1946) for Madame Julie Lavergne, sa vie et son œuvre
- 1900 :
  - Félix Klein for L’évêque de Metz. Vie de Mgr Dupont des Loges (1804-1886)
  - Abbé Ernest Ricard (1852-1944) for Joseph-Auguste Séguret, le jeune martyr du Laos
- 1901 :
  - Marie-Blanche-Angeline d'Adhémar (1849-1935) for La femme catholique et la démocratie française
  - Henri Bremond for L’inquiétude religieuse
  - Jean Guibert (1857-1914) for Histoire de Saint Jean-Baptiste de la Salle
  - Max Turmann (1866-1943) for L’Éducation populaire and Au sortir de l’école. Les Patronages
- 1902 :
  - Antoine Bernard for Le sermon au XVIIIe siècle
  - Abbé Eugène Griselle (1861-1923) for Bourdaloue
  - Émile Horn (1858-1937) for Sainte Élisabeth de Hongrie
  - Fernand Nicolaÿ for Histoire des croyances
- 1903 :
  - Abbé Édouard Lecanuet (1853-1916) for Montalembert
- 1904 :
  - Charles Baille (1832-1919) for Le cardinal de Rohan-Chabot (1788-1833)
  - Dom Antoine du Bourg (1838-1918) for Le frère Gabriel (1835-1897)
  - Abbé Auguste-Pierre Laveille (1856-1928) for Jean-Marie de Lamennais (1780-1860)
  - Jean Lionnet for Un évêque social : Ketteler
- 1905 :
  - Joseph-Émile Fidao-Justiniani (1875-1950) for Le droit des humbles
  - George Fonsegrive for Mariage et union libre
  - Alphonse Kannengieser for Catholiques allemands
  - Georges Renouard (1845-19..) for L’ouest africain et les missions catholiques (Congo et Oubanghi)
- 1906 :
  - Vicomte de Bourbon-Busset for La science considérée comme force morale
  - Henri Bremond for Newman
  - G. de Montgesty for Jean-Gabriel Perboyre
- 1907 :
  - Joseph Aulagne for La réforme catholique du XVIIème siècle dans le diocèse de Limoges
  - Madeleine Combes de Patris for Henriette de Séguret
  - Charles-Alexandre Geoffroy de Grandmaison for Madame Louise de France (1737-1787)
  - M. de Moussac for Monseigneur de Ségur
- 1908 :
  - Joseph Buche (1861-1942) for L’abbé Camille Rambaud de Lyon
  - Chanoine Léon-Adolphe Lenfant for Le cœur et ses richesses
  - Adolphe Regnier (1858-1917) for Saint Martin (316-397)
- 1909 :
  - Henriette Dacier for Saint Jean Chrysostome et la femme chrétienne au IVème siècle de l’Église grecque
  - R.P. Daniel-Antonin Mortier (1858-1942) for Histoire des maîtres généraux de l’ordre des Frères prêcheurs
  - Abbé Jules Paquier (1864-1932) for Le Jansénisme
- 1910 :
  - Pierre Batiffol for L’Enseignement de Jésus
  - R.P. Amédée Chauvin (1852-1923) for De la préparation de la jeunesse à la liberté
  - Ernest Dimnet for Figures de moines
  - Isabelle Kaiser for Marcienne de Flüe. Journal d'une femme
  - Maurice Landrieux for Une petite sœur
  - Alexandre Le Roy for La religion des primitifs
- 1911 :
  - François Bournand for Pages de la Charité
  - Henri Bremond for L’inquiétude religieuse
  - Abbé J.-B. Chaillet for L’abbé Béraud
  - Abbé Léon Jaud (1856-1934) for Saint Filibert
  - Jules Lebreton for Les origines du dogme de la Trinité
  - Abbé Pierre Schoenher for Histoire du séminaire de Saint-Nicolas du Chardonnet
  - Jacques Zeiller for L’idée de l’État dans Saint-Thomas d’Aquin
- 1912 :
  - Abbé Antoine Degert (1859-1931) for Histoire des séminaires français jusqu’à la Révolution
  - Henri-Marie Delsart for Sainte Fare, sa vie et son culte
  - Abbé Léon Désers (1851-1929) for L’Éducation morale et ses conditions
  - Paul Dudon (1859-1941) for Lamennais et le Saint-Siège (1820-1834)
  - Abbé Léon Labauche (1871-1955) for Leçons de théologie dogmatique
  - Abbé Georges Michelet for Dieu et l’agnosticisme contemporain
  - M. de Moussac (1847-1916) for Un prêtre d’autrefois, l’abbé de Moussac vicaire général de Poitiers (1753-1827)
- 1913 :
  - Louis Garriguet (1859-1927) for La valeur sociale de l’Évangile
  - Alphonse Kannengieser for Un Alsacien : Léon Lefébvre
  - Joseph Tixeront for Histoire des dogmes
- 1914 :
  - Abbé Marius Chaillan (1858-1937) for Saint Césaire (470-543)
  - Marianne-Constance de Ganay for Les bienheureuses dominicaines (1190-1577)
  - Chanoine Paul Fiel (1879-1939) for Gustave III et la rentrée du catholicisme en Suède
  - Abbé François Guéret (1863-1936) for Ite ad oves
  - Abbé Auguste-Pierre Laveille (1856-1928) for Chesnelong, sa vie, son action catholique et parlementaire
  - Henri Le Floch for Claude-François Poullard des Places (1679-1709)
  - Abbé Jules Paquier (1864-1932) for Luther et le luthéranisme
  - Maurice Souriau (1856-195.?) for Deux mystiques normands au XVIIème siècle
- 1916 :
  - Abbé Pierre Lelièvre for Leur âme est immortelle
  - Ambroise de Poulpiquet for Le Dogme, source d’unité et de sainteté dans l'Église
  - Abbé Rivet for Institutions du droit ecclésiastique
  - Pierre Rousselot for L’intellectualisme de Saint-Thomas
- 1917 :
  - Louis Arnould for La Providence et le Bonheur
  - Émile Chénon for L’Église et la Guerre
  - Abbé Pierre Jardet for La Femme catholique, son apostolat, son action religieuse et sociale
  - R.P. Jean-Marie Lambert (1857-1935) for Une âme vaillante et rayonnante (Léon Asson)
  - Abbé Charles Sauvé (1848-1925) for Le prêtre intime, élévations
- 1918 :
  - Albert Autin (1883-1963) for L’échec de la réforme en France au XVIème siècle
  - Abbé Charles Guillemant (1865-1931) for Pierre-Louis Parisis
  - Pierre Harispe for Les étapes de Dieu vers nous
  - Félix Klein for Dieu nous aime
  - Robert Vallery-Radot for Le réveil de l’esprit
- 1919 :
  - Pierre Batiffol for Leçons sur la messe
  - Alphonse Kannengieser for En Alsace après l’annexion. M. l’abbé J.-I. Simonis
  - Abbé Pierre Pourrat (1871-1957) for La spiritualité chrétienne des origines de l’Église au moyen âge

=== From 1920 to 1939 ===
- 1920 :
  - R.P. Frédégand d'Anvers (1885-1967) for Étude sur le P. Charles d’Arenberg
  - Abbé Joseph Castillon for Nos douleurs fécondes
  - Abbé Jean-Amable de La Vallette-Monbrun (1872-1930) for Maine de Biran
  - Abbé Louis Prunel (1874-1932) for Cours supérieur de religion
- 1921 :
  - P. Albert Bessières (1877-1953) for Âmes nouvelles
  - P. Joseph Bricout (1867-1930) for Monseigneur d’Hulst, apologiste
  - Augustin Fliche for Saint Grégoire VII
  - Noël Hallé for La guerre française et chrétienne
  - Joseph Martin and Edmée Vesco de Kereven (1871-1945) for La famille Aubert
- 1922 :
  - Gustave Bardy for En lisant les Pères
  - Bernard du Boisrouvray for Monseigneur Gay, évêque d'Anthédon (1815-1892)
  - G. Du Bourg for Sous l’uniforme et sous le froc. Dom Antoine du Bourg (1838-1918)
  - R.P. Georges Guitton (1877-1962) for Louis Lenoir, aumônier des Marsouins (1914-1917)
  - Dom Auguste-Marie-Pierre Ingold (1852-1923) for Général et trappiste. Le Père Marie-Joseph, baron de Céramb (1772-1848)
  - Abbé Pierre Lelièvre for Histoire catholique de la France
  - Albert Lopez for La lumière d’Israël
  - Jeanne Taillandier for Sœur Marie Saint-Anselme
- 1923 :
  - Abbé Paul Buysse for Vers la croyance
  - Louis-Claude Fillion for Vie de Notre Seigneur Jésus-Christ
  - Mme Ad. Goutay for Les voix de la piété française
  - Gaston Sortais (1852-1926) for La philosophie moderne depuis Bacon jusqu’à Leibnitz
  - Abbé Charles Thellier de Poncheville for La vie divinisée
- 1924 :
  - Paul Cheneau (18..-1926) for Les saints d’Égypte
  - R.P. Victor Hostachy (1885-1967) for Joie et Sainteté
  - Alphonse Kannengieser for Un sociologue alsacien, l’abbé Henri Cetty, curé de Mulhouse
  - Félix Klein for Madeleine Sémer, convertie et mystique (1874-1921)
  - Gabriel Ledos (1864-1939) for Saint Pierre Claver (1585-1654)
