= Henri Plard =

French translator

- Born: 16 August 1920; Dijon
- Died: 25 May 2004 (aged 83); City of Brussels
- Occupations: translator and Germanist
- Awards: Prix Langlois (1976); Goethe Medal (1981)

Henri Plard (1920–2004) was a French translator and Germanist.

== Biography ==
Henri Plard had a Protestant upbringing in Rouen, where his parents were teachers. After a brilliant academic career at the Lycée Pierre-Corneille in Rouen, he continued his education in khâgne from 1937 to 1940. He studied from 1937 to 1939 at the Lycée Henri-IV in Paris and from 1939 to 1940 in Rennes. In 1938 he studied for some time in Cologne. From 1937 to 1942, Plard sporadically studied German philology and literature, as well as Danish philology and literature, at the Sorbonne, where Maurice Boucher and Alfred Jolivet were two of his professors. In 1940 he matriculated at ENS Paris. As a student there, he was arrested on boulevard Saint-Michel in June 1942 for wearing a protest yellow badge on his jacket, and imprisoned for three months at Drancy internment camp. In 1943 he completed his studies at ENS Paris achieving first place in the German language exam. After graduation he became a professor at a lycée in Dijon. From 1945 to 1989, Plard was a professor of German language and literature at the Université libre de Bruxelles (ULB).

In 1951 Plon persuaded Plard to make a translation of Ernst Jünger's 1949 novel Heliopolis. Jünger was so impressed by the quality of the translation that he retained Plard as a translator for the next thirty-five years, and Plard became Jünger's main publicist in the Francophone world. However, in 1988 Plard became offended and distanced himself from Jünger because of some anti-Semitic remarks allegedly made by Jünger. During his career, Plard translated more than 7,000 pages of Jünger's oeuvre.

Plard was also noteworthy for his translations of essays and/or novels by Angelus Silesius, Georg Christoph Lichtenberg, Arthur Schopenhauer, Lou Andreas-Salomé, Günther Anders, Hannah Arendt, and Hans Henny Jahnn. Plard's writings deal with the literature of the 17th century (Angelus Silesius, Andreas Gryphius) as well as the contemporary era (Thomas Mann). Plard was one of the first French-speaking Germanists to recognize the talents of Heinrich Böll and Günter Grass, with whom he became friends.

Henry Plard was committed to the morality and spirituality of Christianity. At the ULB Institut du Christianisme (Institute of Christianity) from 1965 to 1985, he taught courses in the history of Christian spirituality and in the history of the Church. In 1970 he also became full professor of German literature at the Vrije Universiteit Brussel. During student protests of the 1960s, he served from 1967 to 1970 in the presidency of the Faculty of Philosophy and Letters of the ULB.

He received the prestigious Goethe Medal in 1981, and, in 1983, was elected a member of the Royal Academies for Science and the Arts of Belgium (RASAB). Plard was also awarded the 1976 prix Langlois of the Académie française for his work as a translator. In 1985 a festschrift was published in his honor.

In 1943 Henry Plard married his childhood friend, Marie-Louise Coffre. They had a son, Laurent, and two daughters, Christine and Elisabeth.

== Selected publications ==
- La mystique d'Angelus Silesius, Aubier-Montaigne, Paris, 1953.
- Du relèvement national à la Révolution de 1848, dans F. Mossé (éd.), Histoire de la littérature allemande, Aubier, 1959, p. 499-715. Nouvelle édition augmentée 1995.

=== Translations ===
- Günther Anders, Kafka, pour et contre, Circé, Belval, 1990.
- Lou Andreas-Salomé, Eros, Les Éditions de Minuit, Paris, 1984.
- Hannah Arendt, Rahel Varnhagen. La vie d'une Juive allemande à l'époque du Romantisme, Tierce, Paris, 1986.
- Marieluise Fleisser, Avant-garde suivi de Souvenirs sur Brecht, Les Éditions de Minuit, Paris, 1981.
- Hans Henny Jahnn, La nuit de plomb, Les Éditions du Seuil, Paris, 1963.
- Ernst Jünger, Héliopolis. Vue d’une ville disparue, Plon, Paris, 1952.
- Ernst Jünger, Journal, 2 volumes, Julliard, Paris, 1951-1953 (avec Frédéric de Towarnicki).
- Ernst Jünger, Essai sur l'homme et le temps : Tome I : Traité du rebelle; Tome II : Polarisations. Traité du Sablier; T. III. Le Nœud gordien. Passage de la Ligne, Les Éditions du Rocher, Monaco, 1957-1958.
- Ernst Jünger, Abeilles de verre, Plon, Paris, 1959.
- Ernst Jünger, Orages d'acier. Journal de guerre, Plon, Paris, 1960.
- Ernst Jünger, L'État universel: Organisme et organisation, Gallimard, Paris, 1962.
- Ernst Jünger, Journal de Guerre et d’Occupation (1939-1948), Julliard, Paris, 1965.
- Ernst Jünger, Visite à Godenholm, suivi de La chasse au sanglier, Christian Bourgois, Paris, 1968.
- Ernst Jünger, Chasses subtiles, Christian Bourgois, Paris, 1969.
- Ernst Jünger, Approches, drogues et ivresse, La Table Ronde, Paris, 1973.
- Ernst Jünger, Le lance-pierres, La Table Ronde, Paris, 1974.
- Ernst Jünger, Le contemplateur solitaire, Grasset, Paris, 1975, prix Langlois de l’Académie française en 1976.
- Ernst Jünger, Graffiti/Frontalières précédé de Autour du Sinaï, Christian Bourgois, Paris, 1977.
- Ernst Jünger, Eumeswil, La Table Ronde, Paris, 1978.
- Ernst Jünger, Journal, 1. Jardins et routes (1940-1941), Christian Bourgois, 1979.
- Ernst Jünger, Journal, 2. Premier journal parisien (1941-1943), Christian Bourgois, Paris, 1980.
- Ernst Jünger, Journal, 3. Second journal parisien (1943-1945), Christian Bourgois, Paris, 1980.
- Ernst Jünger, La cabane dans la vigne. Journal IV : 1945-1948, Christian Bourgois, Paris, 1980.
- Ernst Jünger, Jardins et routes. Journal 1. Strahlungen, 1939-1940, LGF, Paris, 1982.
- Ernst Jünger, L’Auteur et l’Écriture, Christian Bourgois, Paris, 1982.
- Ernst Jünger, Soixante-dix s’efface. Journal 1965-1970, Gallimard, Paris, 1984.
- Ernst Jünger, Soixante-dix s’efface 2. Journal 1971-1980, Gallimard, Paris, 1985.
- Ernst Jünger, Sertissages. À propos de l’Apocalypse, Fata Morgana, Cognac, 1998.
- Wolf Lepenies, Les trois cultures. Entre science et littérature, l’avènement de la sociologie, Éd. de la Maison des sciences de l’homme, Paris, 1990.
- Georg Christoph Lichtenberg, Lettres sur l’Angleterre, Circé, Belval, 1998.
- Armin Mohler, La Révolution conservatrice en Allemagne 1918-1932, Pardès, Puiseaux, 1993.
- Arthur Schopenhauer, L’art d’avoir toujours raison ou Dialectique éristique, Circé, Belval, 1990.
- Angelus Silesius, Le Pèlerin chérubinique, Aubier-Montaigne, Paris, 1948.
- Oswald Spengler, Écrits historiques et philosophiques. Pensées, Copernic, Paris, 1980.
