= Jacques Dars =

French sinologist and translator

Jacques Dars (1941 – 28 December 2010) was a French sinologist and translator. He translated several works into French, including Water Margin (Shuihu zhuan).

In 1979 he won the Prix Langlois, Prix de l’Académie française for the Traduction de Au bord de l’eau, de Shi Naï-an et Luo Guan-Zhong.

He spoke over 20 languages. He died on 28 December 2010 in Annecy, France at age 69.

== Publications ==
In French:

- La marine chinoise du X^{e} au XIV^{e} siècle, 1992, Economica, Paris
- Comment lire un roman chinois, 2001, Picquier, Arles
- L'unique trait de pinceau, avec Fabienne Verdier et Cyrille Javary, 2001, Albin Michel
- Dars, Jacques. "Traduction terminable et interminable." (Archive) In: Alleton, Vivianne and Michael Lackner (editors). De l'un au multiple: traductions du chinois vers les langues européennes Translations from Chinese into European Languages. Éditions de la maison des sciences de l'homme (Les Editions de la MSH, FR), 1999, Paris. p. 146-159. ISBN 273510768X, 9782735107681. - English abstract available

Translations (in French):

- Li Yu (2003). Au gré d'humeurs oisives : Les carnets secrets de Li Yu : un art du bonheur en Chine. Arles : Éditions Philippe Picquier. ISBN 2-87730-664-X
- Shi Nai'an, Au bord de l'eau (Shuihu zhuan), traduit, présenté et annoté par J. Dars, préface d'Étiemble, Gallimard, Paris, 1st édition 1978 - Prix Langlois 1979 de l'Académie française
- Contes de la Montagne sereine, traduction, introduction et notes par J. Dars, 1987, Gallimard, Connaissance de l'Orient, Paris
- Aux portes de l'enfer, récits fantastiques de la Chine ancienne, trad. du chinois par J. Dars, 1997, Picquier, Arles
- Ji Yun, Passe-temps d'un été à Luanyang, traduit du chinois, présenté et annoté par J. Dars, 1998, Gallimard, Paris
- Ji Yun, Des nouvelles de l'au-delà, textes choisis, traduits du chinois et annotés par J. Dars, 2005, Gallimard, Paris
- Qu You, Le pavillon des Parfums-Réunis, et autres nouvelles chinoises des Ming, traduit du chinois par Jacques Dars, revu par Tchang Foujouei, 2007, Gallimard, folio, Paris
