= Tournon-sur-Rhône =

- Subprefecture and commune
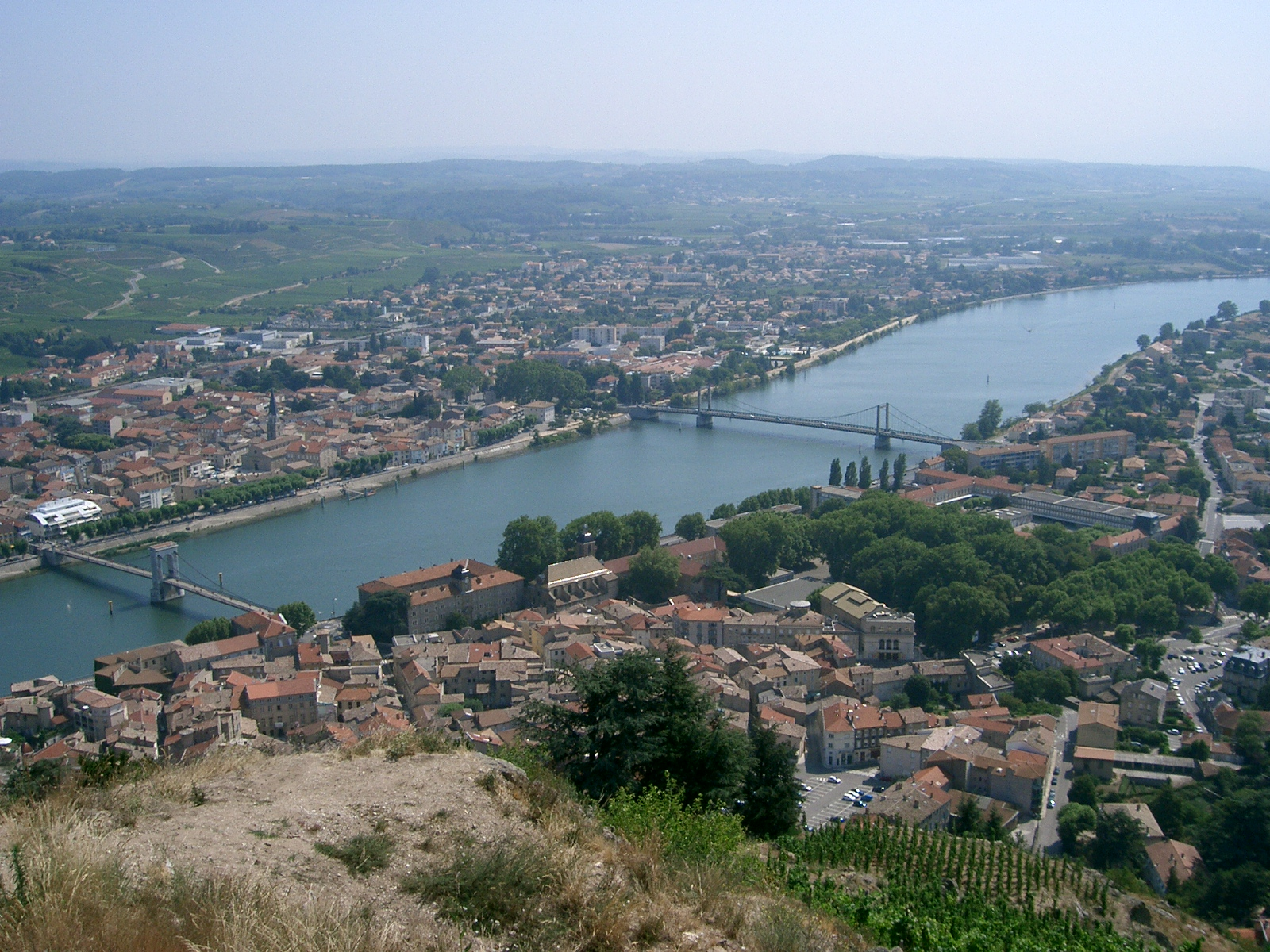
- A view across the river in Tournon-sur-Rhône

- Coat of arms
- Location of Tournon-sur-Rhône
- Location within France Location within Auvergne-Rhône-Alpes
- Coordinates: 45°04′05″N 4°50′00″E
- Country: France
- Region: Auvergne-Rhône-Alpes
- Department: Ardèche
- Arrondissement: Tournon-sur-Rhône
- Canton: Tournon-sur-Rhône
- Intercommunality: CA Arche Agglo

Government
  - Mayor (2020–2026): Frédéric Sausset
- Area^{1}: 21.01 km^{2} (8.11 sq mi)
- Elevation: 123 m (404 ft)
- Highest elevation: 508 m (1,667 ft)
- Lowest elevation: 115 m (377 ft)
- Population (2023): 11,279
  - Density: 536.8/km^{2} (1,390/sq mi)
- Time zone: UTC+01:00 (CET)
  - Summer (DST): UTC+02:00 (CEST)
- INSEE/Postal code: 07324 /07300
- ^{1} French Land Register data, which excludes lakes, ponds, glaciers > 1 km^{2} (0.386 sq mi or 247 acres) and river estuaries.

Tournon-sur-Rhône (French: [tuʁnɔ̃ syʁ ʁon]; Occitan: Tornon, before 1988: Tournon) is a commune in the Ardèche department of southern France. It is one of the most populous communes in the Ardèche department, after Annonay, Aubenas, and Guilherand-Granges.

== Geography ==
It is located on the right bank of the river Rhône, in the Ardèche departement, opposite Tain-l'Hermitage, (which is located in the Drôme département).

== History ==
Tournon had its own counts as early as the 9th century reign of Louis I. In the middle of the 17th century the title passed from them to the dukes of Ventadour.

== Population ==
Historical population

Year	Pop.	±% p.a.
1793	3,300	—
1800	3,419	+0.51%
1806	3,984	+2.58%
1821	3,555	−0.76%
1831	3,971	+1.11%
1836	4,174	+1.00%
1841	4,740	+2.58%
1846	4,807	+0.28%
1851	4,861	+0.22%
1856	4,918	+0.23%
1861	5,252	+1.32%
1866	5,509	+0.96%
1872	5,390	−0.36%
1876	6,083	+3.07%
1881	5,092	−3.49%
1886	5,286	+0.75%
1891	5,146	−0.54%
1896	5,344	+0.76%
1901	5,174	−0.64%

Year	Pop.	±% p.a.
1906	5,003	−0.67%
1911	4,719	−1.16%
1921	5,037	+0.65%
1926	5,043	+0.02%
1931	5,332	+1.12%
1936	5,658	+1.19%
1946	5,798	+0.24%
1954	6,785	+1.98%
1962	6,878	+0.17%
1968	7,858	+2.24%
1975	8,732	+1.52%
1982	9,099	+0.59%
1990	9,546	+0.60%
1999	9,946	+0.46%
2007	10,571	+0.76%
2012	10,781	+0.39%
2017	10,307	−0.90%
2023	11,279	+1.51%

Source: EHESS and INSEE (1968-2023)

== Notable sights ==
- The church of St Julian dates chiefly from the 14th century.
- The lycée occupies an old college founded in the 16th century by Cardinal François de Tournon, and is today still a functioning high school Lycée Gabriel-Faure but is occasionally open for tours.
- One of the two suspension bridges which unite the town with Tain-l'Hermitage on the left bank of the river is the Passerelle Marc-Seguin. It was built in 1825 and is the oldest suspension bridge in France, today carrying only pedestrians.
- The Château de Tournon has a museum and commanding views over the Rhône.

== Notable people ==
- François de Tournon (1489-1562), cardinal, Archbishop of Aude, then of Lyon, advisor to King Francis I
- Jean-Antoine Courbis (1752–1795), lawyer and revolutionary
- Gabriel Faure (1877-1962), French writer and italophile
- Sébastien Joly (born 1979), racing cyclist, coach and sports director
- Greta Richioud (born 1996), racing cyclist

== See also ==
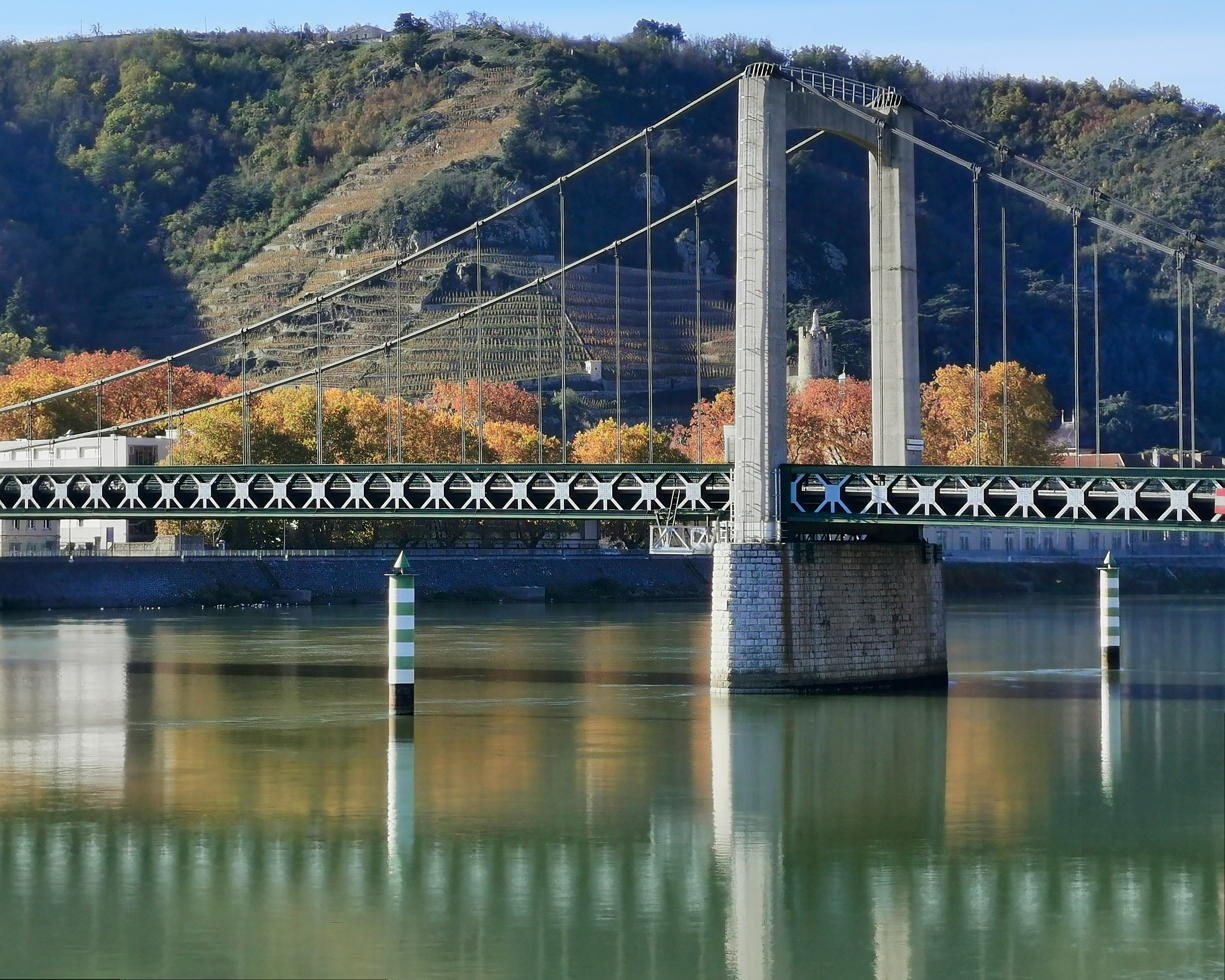
Gustave-Toursier bridge with the Tour de la Vierge in the background

- Communes of the Ardèche department
- Antoine Sartorio
