= Lucien Falize =

French jeweller and writer in France

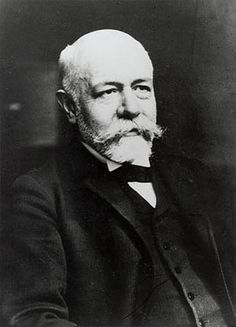
- Born: Joseph Lucien Mignon-Falize; 4 August 1839; Paris, France
- Died: 4 September 1897 (aged 58); France
- Known for: Jewellery, decorative art, writing
- Style: precursor to Art Nouveau
- Spouse: Louise Clémentine Poulard (1850–1914)

Lucien Falize (Paris 4 August 1839 – Paris 4 September 1897) was a French jeweller and writer in France who was responsible for pioneering and driving the Art Nouveau movement with his firm, Falize. He is known for his breathtaking and innovative designs for both public and private sales.

== Early years ==
Lucien was a serious and diligent child who planned to attend the Ecole Centrale des Arts et Manufactures before his father, Alexis, announced he was to become a future partner in his relatively young firm, Falize. In 1856, Lucien began an apprenticeship with his father, where he quickly learnt enough to supervise the design and manufacture of the pieces created in the workshop. His studies continued quickly, as Lucien found his passion, and in 1869 at the exhibition held by the Union Centrale des Beaux Arts appliqués à l’Industrie, he was awarded a First class medal as a coopérateur. Two years later, at the age of 32, he was made a full partner and took over the firm in 1876.

== Marriage and children ==
The same year he was made a partner, Lucien married Louise Clémentine Poulard (1850–1914), with whom he had three sons: André Alexis Eugène (1872–1936), Jean Henri Lucien (1874–1948), and Pierre Isidore (1875–1953). Although there is little evidence of tenderness and passion between Lucien and Clémentine – it is thought his parents instigated the match – he was a devoted father, designing and making individual silver watches for each of his children's first communion.

== Artistic career ==
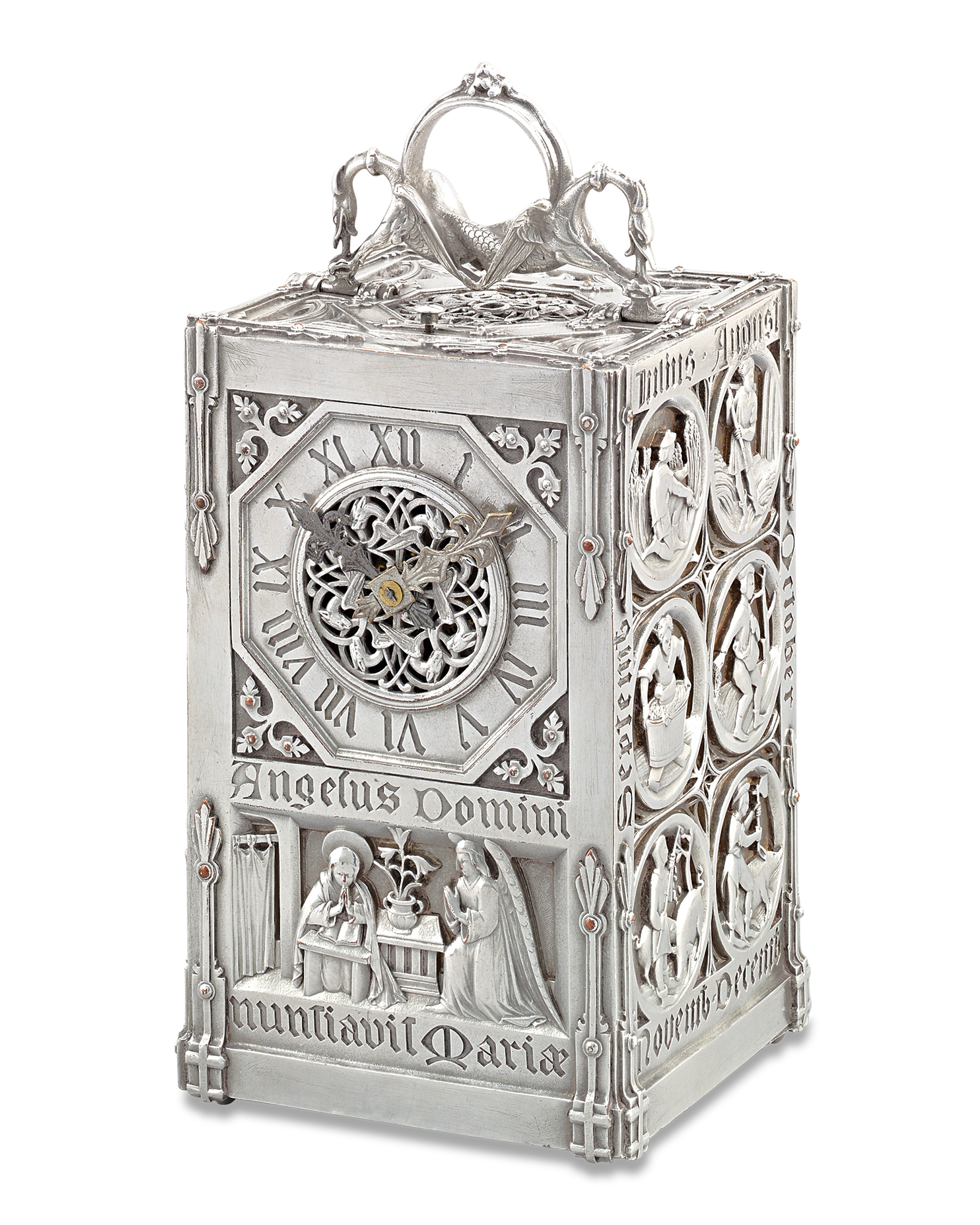
Gothic Revival Angelus Carriage Clock

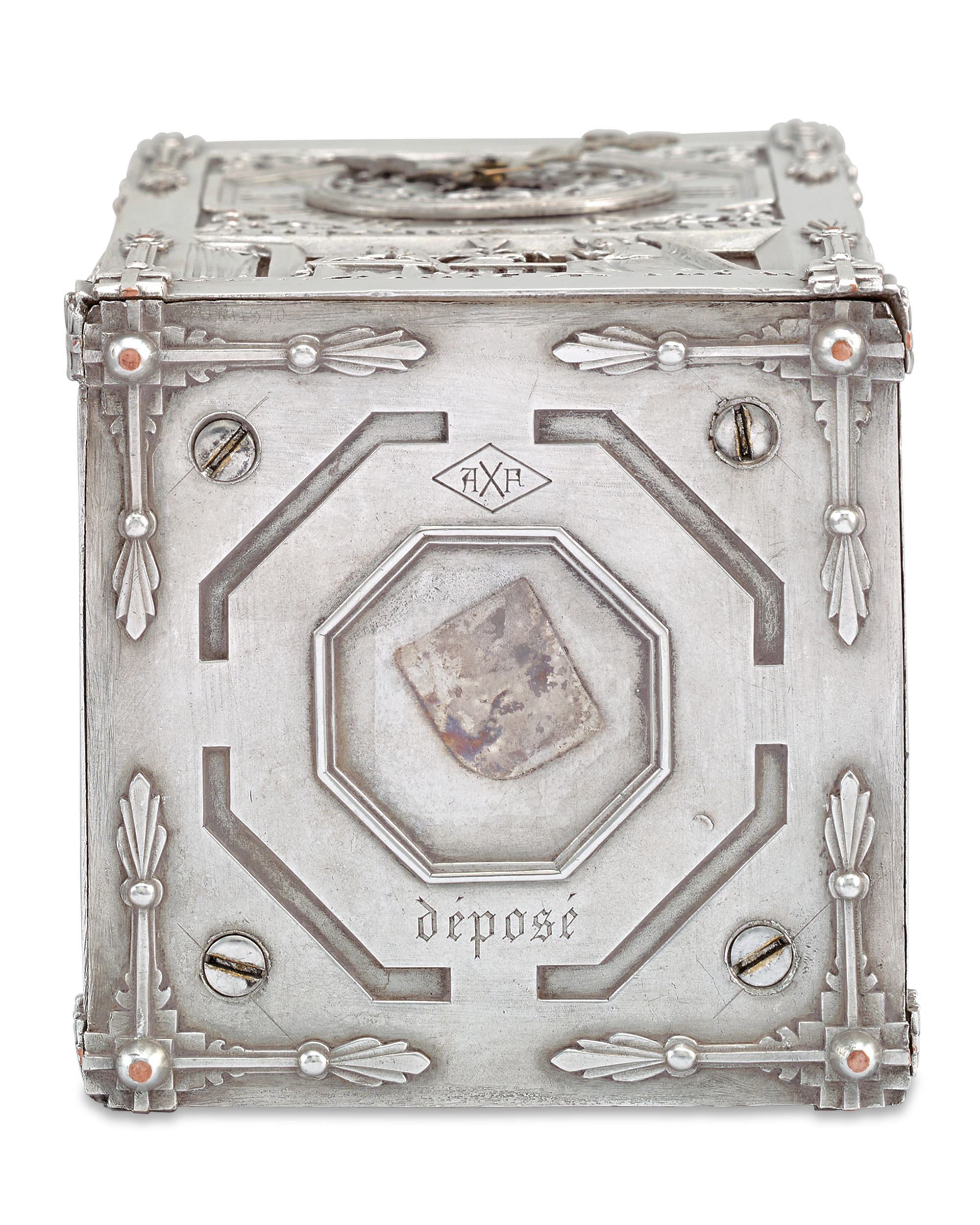
Falize's makers mark, circa 1878-1880

Lucien Falize was heavily influenced by his visits to London in 1861 and 1862, where he went to the National Gallery, Westminster Abbey, and the Crystal Palace. He was struck by the Chinese, Indian, Assyrian, and Egyptian exhibits, and at the International Exhibition he was impressed by the Oriental lacquers, enamels, bronzes, prints, and earthenware taken from the collection of Sir Rutherford Alcock.

Due to his ties to the firm, Falize was unable to travel to Japan, but his passion for the East began to manifest through his designs. Pendants, bracelets, necklaces, and brooches with a distinct Oriental effect began to emerge. These were enamelled and filled with bold, opaque colours with delicate scenes of nature and animals. Lucien also visited the Campana collection at the Louvre, where he viewed a number of items, being influenced by the treasure trove of medieval, Renaissance, Assyrian, Egyptian, and Byzantine objects.

In 1871, Lucien Falize pioneered the new method of cloisonné enameling, a meticulous process involving thin metal strands that outlined intricate designs filled with enamel, which became a defining feature of his jewelry designs.

Until his death by a stroke in 1897, Lucien continued to create breathtaking designs for public sale and private commissions. He was determined to make the jewelry house Falize a commercial success, collaborating with other established designers like Germain Bapst, crown jeweller of the Second Empire, with whom he was partnered as Bapst & Falize from 1880 to 1892. He succeeded Bapst as official goldsmith to the French Government. He was a prolific writer and reviewer and often published under his pseudonym, ‘Monsieur Josse’ in the decorative arts journals of the day. In the 1890s, Lucien Hirtz, formerly associated with Boucheron, joined Falize's firm, contributing to the creation of distinctive pieces that combined fine goldwork and enameling in a Japoniste manner. In 1896, at the Salon des Artistes Français, Falize showcased a collaboration with Émile Gallé, presenting a glass vase mounted with silver, exemplifying the fusion of different art forms during the Art Nouveau movement.

Lucien Falize was also deeply involved in the Union Centrale throughout his career. He firmly believed in the importance of providing proper training to future designers, and he submitted plans for technical exhibitions and donated working prototypes of chatelaines and electrotypes of bracelets. Lucien also entered his firm into a number of competitions and Expositions Universelles and was awarded countless honours and honorary positions throughout his career.

Often frustrated by the need to be a commercial success as well as a critical one, Lucien said in a letter to his son André in April 1896 “a big firm cannot survive on works of art alone.”

His friend, jeweller and collector Henri Vever, said about Lucien:

How he would have loved to have lived…at the time of the Medici, freed from heavy commercial burdens and only preoccupied by the creation of beautiful works.

== Exhibitions and awards ==
1869: Union Centrale des Beaux arts appliqués à l’Industrie

Awarded a First class medal as a coopérateur

1876: Union Centrale des Beaux arts appliqués à l’Industrie

As he was a jury member and official reporter, Lucien was excluded from the awards

1877: Amsterdam Exhibition

Represented France with Alfred Darcel

1878: Exposition Universelle, Paris

Awarded a Grand Prix; granted a Legion d’Honneur

1880: ‘Les Arts du Métal’ at the Union Centrale

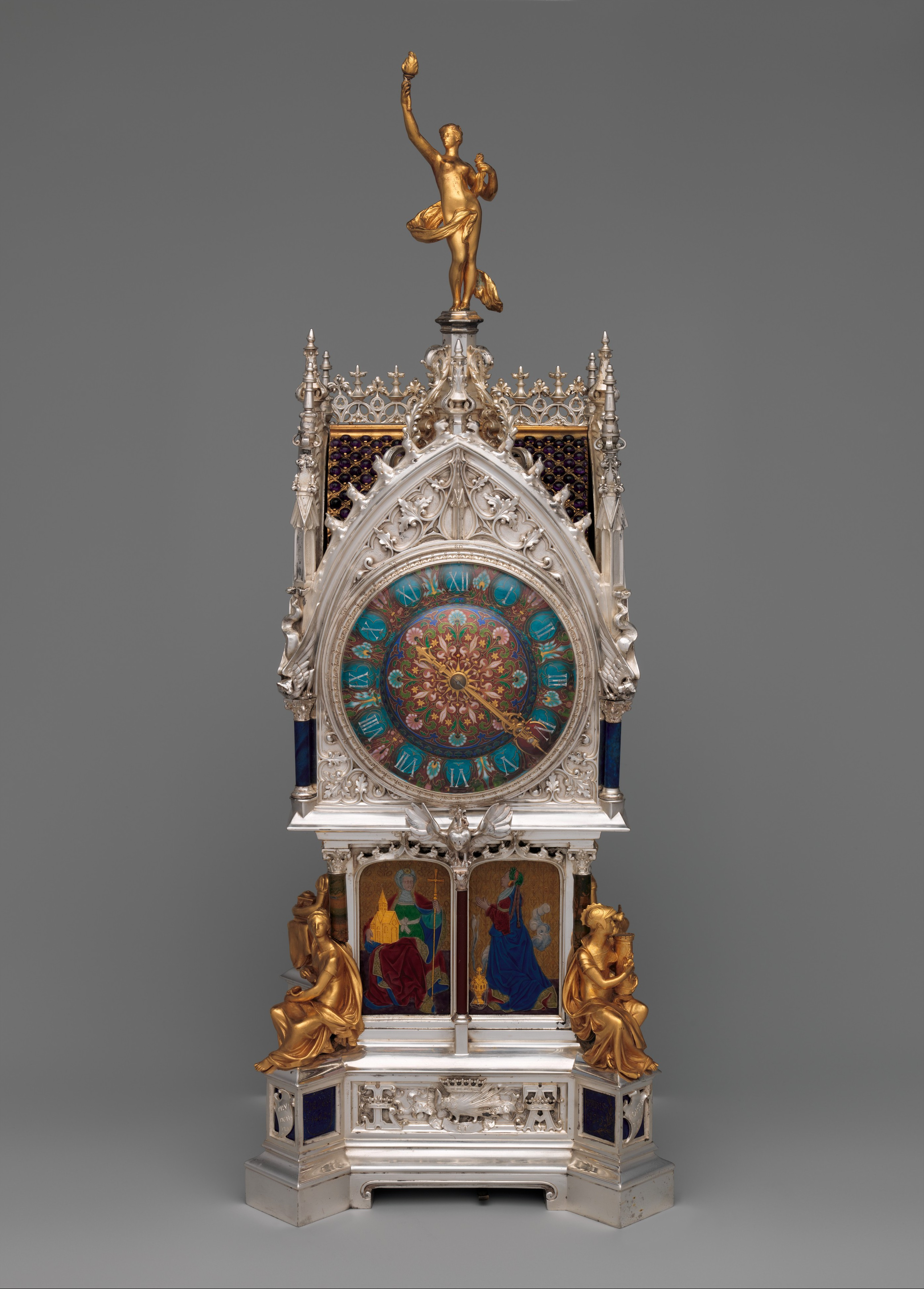
Gothic revival table clock with calendar, 1881, displayed at the 1889 Exposition Universelle

1889: Exposition Universelle, Paris

Official reporter on the goldsmith’s section, and was therefore unable to be awarded any prizes.
Received public recognition by being decorated Officer de la Légion d’Honneur

1896: Salon des Champs-Elysées

Lucien’s gold enamelled ‘hanap’ (lidded goblet) hailed as a technical masterpiece

== Commissions ==
- Alfred Morrison (1821 – 1897): second son of James Morrison (founder of firm Morrison, Dillon & Co which was to become the Fore Street Limited Liability Company)
- Gaston de Galard de Béarn, Prince de Viana (1840 – 1893): one of Lucien's most eminent patrons
- The Péreire brothers: Emile and Isaac, prominent property developers and financiers
- La Marquise Arconati-Visconti (1840 – 1923): daughter of Alphonse Peyrat
- Eduord Corroyer (1837 – 1904): architect and pupil of Viollet-le-Duc
- Princess Loetitia Bonaparte: great-niece of Napoleon I
- Tsar Nicholas II (1868 – 1918) and his wife, Empress Alexandra Feodorovna (1872 – 1918)
- Queen Marie (1875 – 1938) and King Ferdinand I (1865 – 1927) of Romania
- Prince Alfred (1844 – 1900), Duke of Edinburgh and Saxe-Coburg-Gotha: son of Queen Victoria
- Several sporting clubs in France enlisted Falize in creating sculptures, barometers, and clocks: The Jockey Club, the Société du Yacht-Club, Société des Steeple-Chases

== Gallery ==
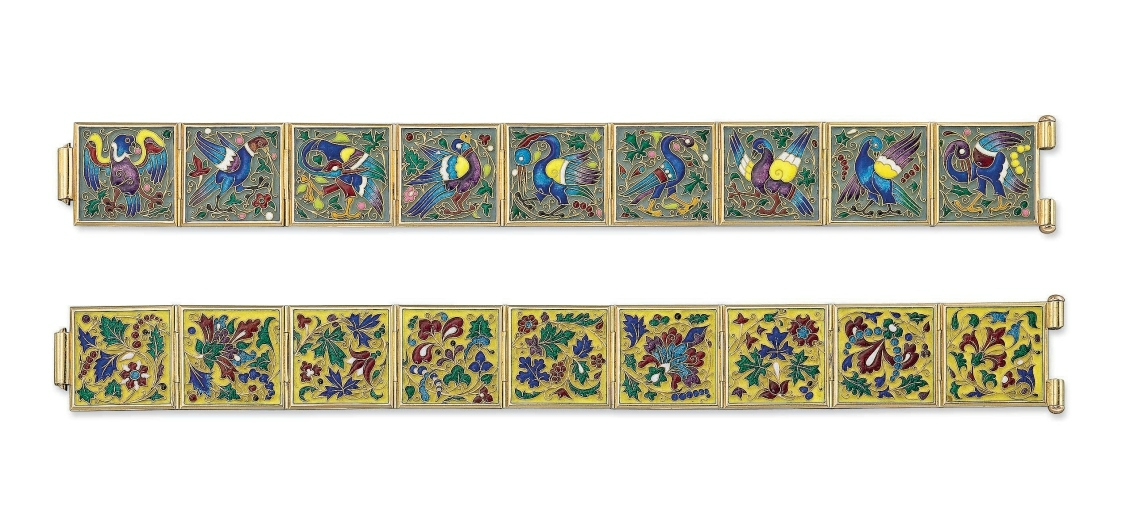

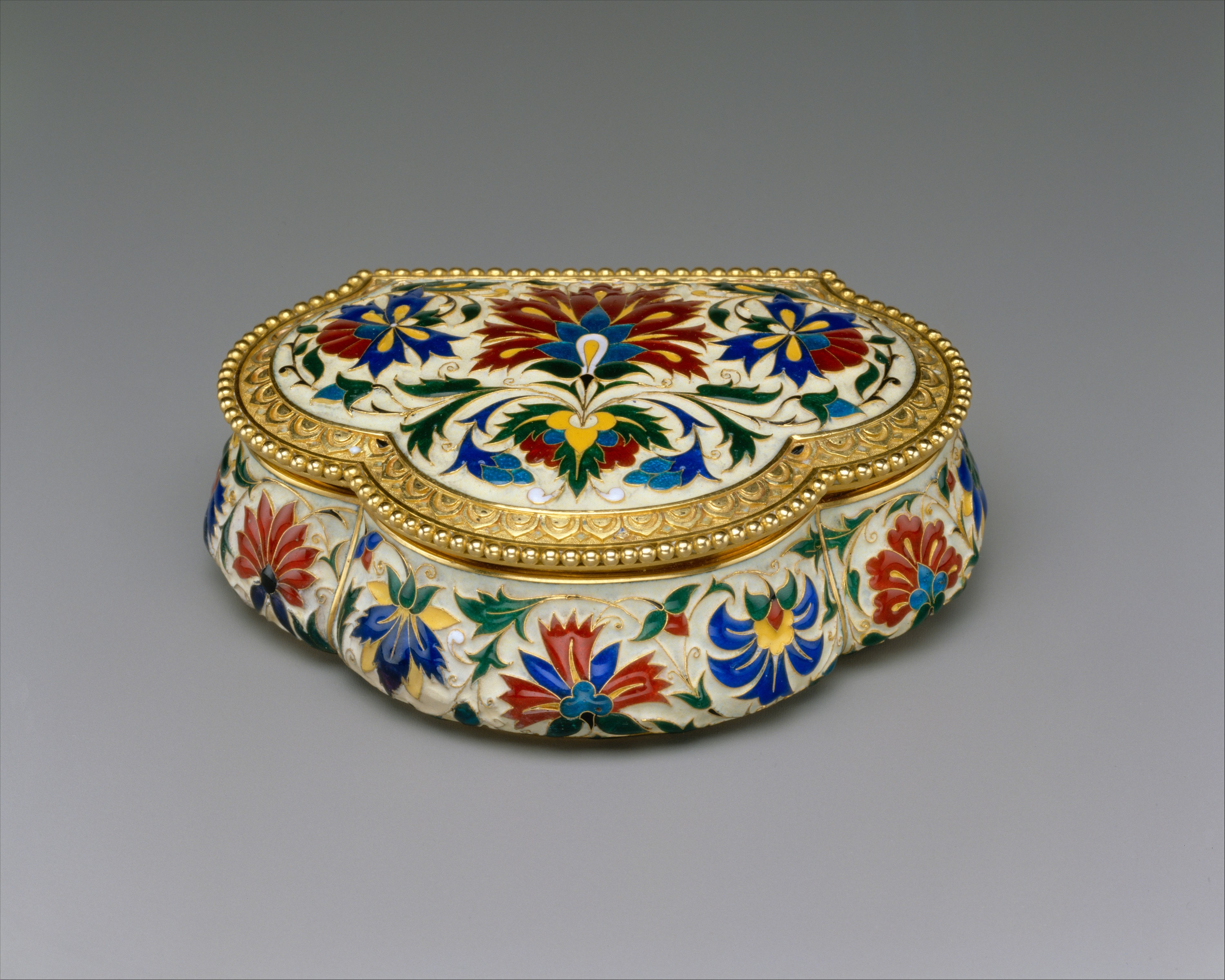

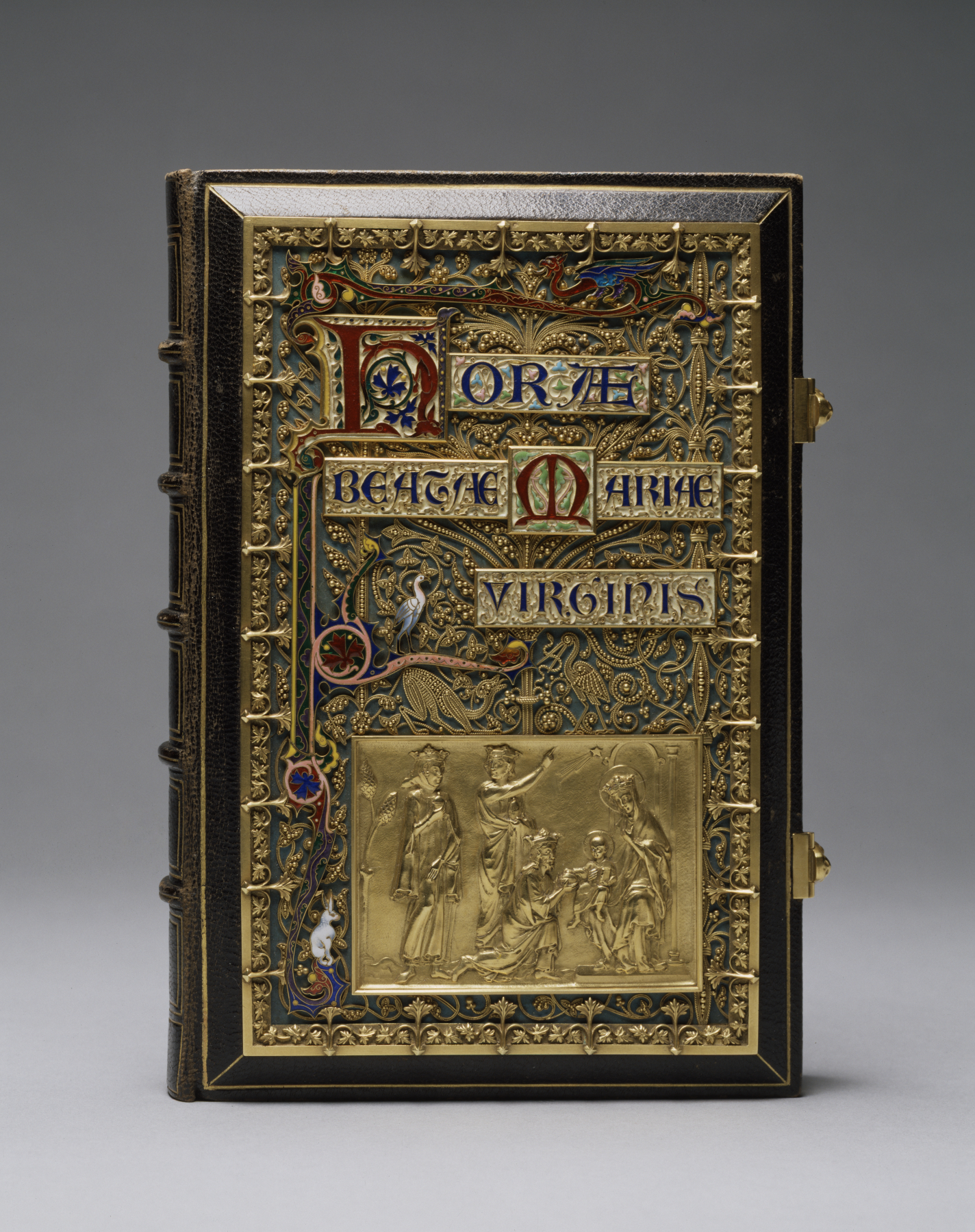

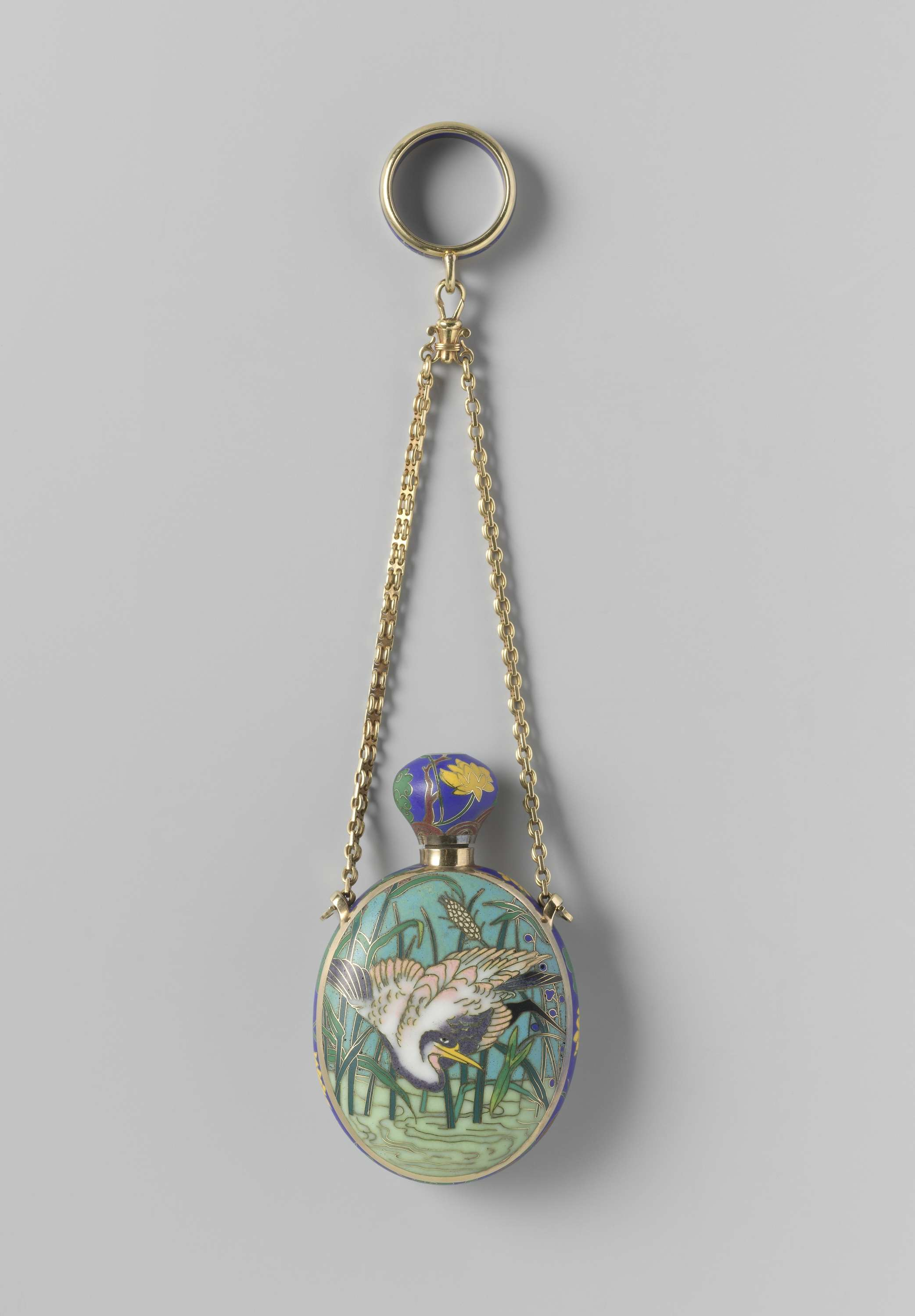

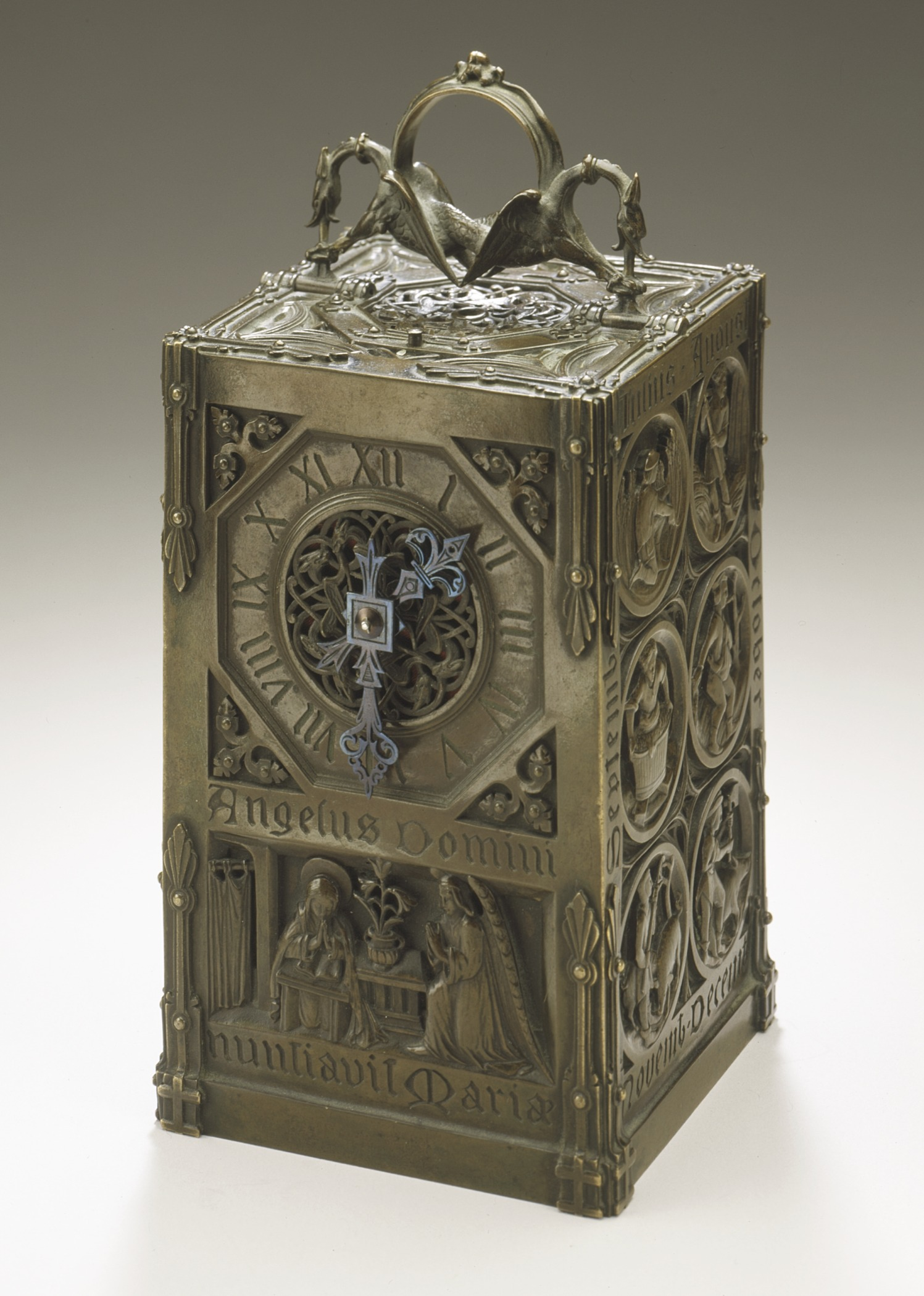
