= Prix Langlois =

The Prix Langlois was a prize awarded by the Académie française from 1868 to 1987 for "the best translation in verse or prose of a Greek, Latin or foreign-language work".

== Laureates ==
Prix Langlois winners
Year	Translator	title (French)	title (English)	prize
1987	Marcel Conche	les Fragments, d’Héraclite	the Fragments of Heraclitus	Silver Medal
1983	Philippe Lavergne	Finnegans Wake, de James Joyce	Finnegans Wake by James Joyce	3,000 Francs
1982	Efim Etkind	Œuvres poétiques, d’Alexandre Pouchkine	the poetic works of Alexander Pushkin	3,000 Francs
1980	André Berry	Anthologie de la poésie occitane	Anthology of Occitan poetry	2,500 Francs
1979	Jacques Dars	Au bord de l'eau, de Shi Naï-an et Luo Guan-Zhong	The Water Margin by Shi Nai'an and Luo Guanzhong	5,000 Francs
1978	Madeleine Horst	La Nef des fous, de Sébastien Brant	The Ship of Fools by Sebastian Brant	3,000 Francs
1977	Jean-Claude Schneider	Correspondance complète de Kleist	the complete correspondence of Heinrich von Kleist	2,000 Francs
1976	Henri Plard	Le Contemplateur solitaire, d'Ernst Jünger	The Lone Contemplator, selected essays by Ernst Jünger	2,000 Francs
1975	Émile Delage	Les Argonautiques, d'Apollonios de Rhodes	the Argonautica of Apollonius of Rhodes	2,000 Francs
1975	Francis Vian	Argonautiques, d'Apollonios de Rhodes	the Argonautica of Apollonius of Rhodes	2,000 Francs
1974	Jacqueline de Romilly	Œuvres de Thucydide	the works of Thucydides	2,500 Francs
1973	Alain Frontier	Le cheval de Troie ou le grec dans nos murs	The Trojan Horse or the Greek within Our Walls (school textbook)	1,000 Francs
1970	Philippe de Rothschild	Présentation et traduction des poètes élisabéthains	presentation and translation of the Elizabethan poets	Bronze Medal
1969	Geneviève Buckhardt	Italie poétique contemporaine	Contemporary Italian Poetics	500 Francs
1968	Jean Carrère	Correspondance de Hegel	Correspondence of Hegel	1,000 Francs
1968	Johana Ritt	Le dos tourné, récits de Marek Hlasko	All Backs Were Turned by Marek Hłasko	500 Francs
1968	Jacqueline Trabuc	Le dos tourné, récits de Marek Hlasko	All Backs Were Turned by Marek Hłasko	500 Francs
1967	Jean-Claude Margolin	Édition du De pueris d’Érasme and his work Érasme par lui-même	De pueris statim ac liberaliter instituendis by Erasmus with Margolin's book Erasmus, by himself	1,000 Francs
1966	Jean-Jacques Marie	Collines et autres poèmes, de Iossip Brodski	Hills, and Other Poems by Joseph Brodsky	500 Francs
1966	Jean-Paul Boucher	Études sur Properce	Studies on Propertius	1,000 Francs
1965	Serge Tsouladzé	Le Chevalier à la peau de tigre, de Chota Roustaveli	The Knight in the Panther's Skin by Shota Rustaveli	500 Francs
1965	Roger Richard	La Tragédie de l'homme, d'Imre Madach	The Tragedy of Man by Imre Madách	500 Francs
1964	Pierre Pascal	Traductions de Tolstoï et Dostoïevski	translations from Tolstoy and Dostoyevsky	1,000 Francs
1963	Pierre Leyris	Poèmes d'Emily Brontë	the poems of Emily Brontë	500 Francs
1962	André Authier	Manuscrit B, de Léonard de Vinci	Manuscript B of Leonardo da Vinci	300 Francs
1962	André Corbeau	Manuscrit B, de Léonard de Vinci	Manuscript B of Leonardo da Vinci	300 Francs
1962	Pierre Hébert & Yves Hébert	Poèmes mystiques de Saint Jean de la Croix	The Mystical Poems of St. John of the Cross	300 Francs
1962	André Robinet	Édition critique de Malebranche	critical edition of Malebranche	300 Francs
1962	Nando de Toni	Manuscrit B, de Léonard de Vinci	Manuscript B of Leonardo da Vinci	300 Francs
1961	René Herval			500 Francs
1960	Bernard Rochot	La Dissertation en forme de paradoxes contre les Aristotéliciens de P. Gassendi	Dissertation in the form of paradoxes against the Aristotelians by Pierre Gassendi	50,000 Francs
1959	Berthe Lacombe	Don Juan, de Maranon	Don Juan by Gregorio Marañón	15,000 Francs
1959	Marcel Thomas	La vie de J.-K. Huysmans	The Life of J. K. Huysmans	15,000 Francs
1958	Antoine Gentien	Le berceau des nuages, de Sudhin N. Ghose	The Cradle of the Clouds by Sudhindra Nath Ghose	5,000 Francs
1957	Pierre Paraf & Anne-Mathilde Paraf	Deux baronnes, de Hans Christian Andersen	Two Baronesses, by Hans Christian Andersen	10,000 Francs
1956	André Mirambel	Tasso Tassoulo et autres nouvelles, de Thrasso Castonakis		3,000 Francs
1955	Léon Guillot de Saix	Traduction d’Oscar Wilde		3,000 Francs
1955	Ferdinand Kolednik	Les Charretiers, de Ph. Tercelj-Griosky		2,000 Francs
1952	Jean Minassian	Traduction du poème Abou-Lala Mahari, de Avédik Issahakian		1,500 Francs
1951	Denise Meunier	Climat de lune, de Joyce Cary		500 Francs
1951	Léopold Niel	Les Géorgiques, de Virgile	Virgil's Georgics	600 Francs
1951	Jean-Michel Renaitour	Études latines	Latin Studies	600 Francs
1950	Dominique Arban	Correspondance de Dostoïevski	Correspondence of Dostoyevsky	1,000 Francs
1949	Alexandre Masseron	Traduction de Dante	Translation of Dante	500 Francs
1948	Christian Germoz	La vie des aliments, de G. Tallarico; Xanthippe, de Alfredo Panzini		575 Franca
1947	Guy Tosi	Correspondance de d’Annunzio à son traducteur Georges Hérelle		500 Francs
1946	Aubert Le Chesnaye			5,000 Francs
1945	Marius Perrin	Perte et Gain, de John-Henry Newman	Loss and Gain, by John Henry Newman	1,000 Francs
1944	Charles Chassé	Le Parfait pêcheur à la ligne, de Izaak Walton	The Compleat Angler, by Izaak Walton	950 Francs
1943	Louise Servicen	Carnets de Léonard de Vinci	The notebooks of Leonardo da Vinci	2,000 Francs
1942	Pierre-Georget Le Chesnais	Œuvres d'Henrik Ibsen	The Works of Henrik Ibsen	2,000 Francs
1942	Pierre Messiaen	Tragédies de Shakespeare	The Tragedies of Shakespeare	1,500 Francs
1941	Marie-Madeleine Davy	Traité de la vie solitaire, de Guillaume Saint-Thierry		1,000 Francs
1940	Michelin De Limoges	Apologie Pro vita sua, du cardinal J.-H. Newman	Apologia Pro Vita Sua, by cardinal John Henry Newman	1,000 Francs
1939	Julia Bastin	Marina di Vezza, de Aldoux Huxley	Marina di Vezza, by Aldous Huxley	540 Francs
1939	the Countess of Beaumont	Pépita, de Mme Sackeville West		540 Francs

== See also ==
- Former prizes awarded by the Académie française
