= Jacques-Evrard Bapst =

French jeweler (1771–1842)

Evrard Bapst
- Born: Jacques-Evrard Bapst; 1771; Swabia, Holy Roman Empire
- Died: 1842 (aged 70–71); Paris, France
- Known for: Jewelry making
- Spouse: Marie-Nicole Ménière
- Father: Georges-Christophe Bapst

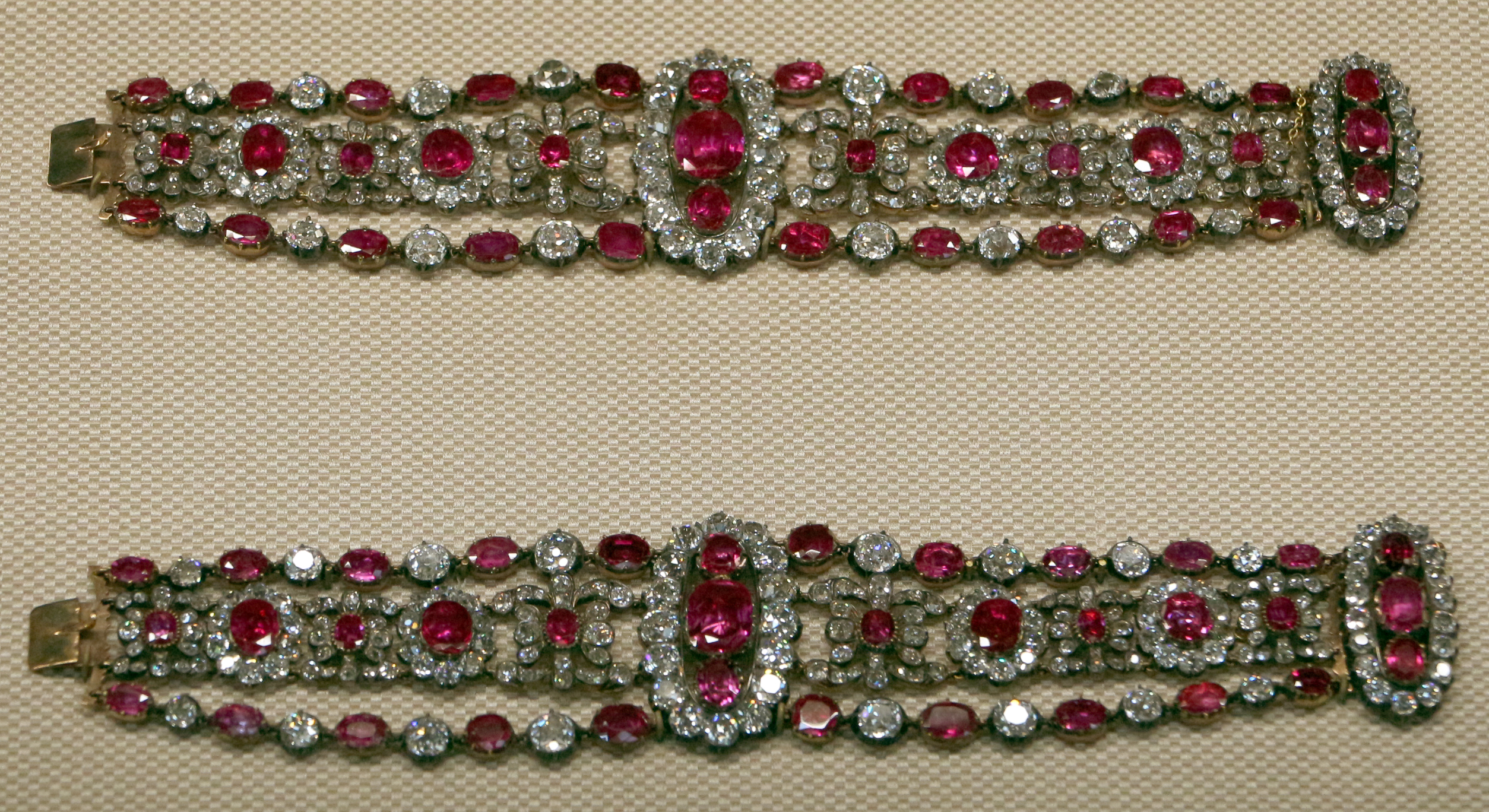
Bracelets of the Duchess of Angoulême c. 1816, by Bapst

Jacques-Evrard Bapst (1771 – 1842) was a French goldsmith and court jeweler to Louis XVIII and Charles X in Paris, France.

== Early life ==
Jacques-Evrard Bapst was born in 1771 in Swabia. He was the son of Georges-Christophe Bapst, a goldsmith in Hall.

He relocated from the Swabia region to Paris, France to assist his cousin Georges-Frédéric Bapst. His cousin had formed a partnership with crown jeweler Paul-Nicolas Menière. Evrard married Menière's daughter in 1796. His wife's name was Marie-Nicole Ménière.

== Career ==
During the Bourbon Restoration in France, Evrard designed and drafted numerous jewels for the family business. The remodelling of a ruby and diamond parure, originally commissioned by Napoleon and later included in the French Crown Jewels, was executed by Menière in 1816, based on designs sketched by Evrard Bapst. The bracelets he designed for Marie Thérèse Charlotte, Duchess of Angoulême, contained 24 oval rubies framed by 356 round brilliants. The rubies had once belonged to Napoleon's wife, the Empress Marie Louise.

Management of the Bapst-Menière firm was transferred to him by his father-in-law in 1817. When Menière resigned, it left vacant the position of goldsmith-jeweler to His Majesty. The title of Jeweler to the Crown was granted to Evrard Bapst in 1821 and continued under Maison Bapst until the Second French Empire ended. The family firm served as jewelers to the French court under Louis XVIII and Charles X.

The Diadem of the Duchess of Angoulême was executed by him and his nephew Christophe-Frédéric Bapst between September 1819 and July 1820, featuring the 14 largest emeralds from the crown jewels. It is currently displayed at the Galerie d'Apollon of the Louvre Paris. The 1822 Badge of the Danish Order of the Elephant that he designed is also exhibited at the Louvre.

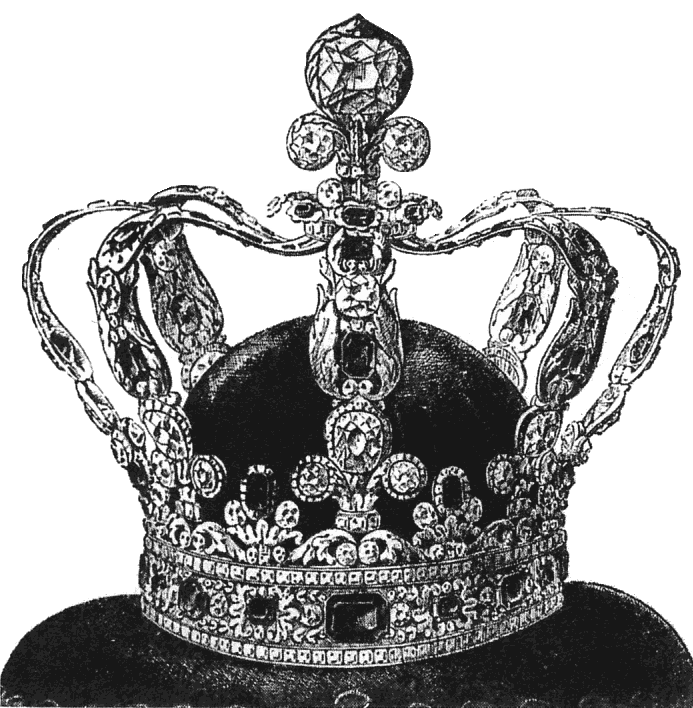
Crown of Charles X, c. 1824–1825

Evrard's design for a diamond-encrusted sword was carried out by Charles Bapst in 1824 and used during the Coronation of Charles X of France on May 29, 1825. It was modeled primarily on the diamond sword of Louis XVI. He also drafted the design for the crown for Charles X's coronation regalia that was made by Christophe-Frédéric Bapst.

In 1828, while serving as jeweler to the Crown, he was entrusted with the Sancy, one of the most renowned diamonds in European history. The stone, then associated with the collection of Manuel Godoy, was to be presented to Charles X for 600,000 francs, though the sale did not proceed.

== Death ==
Jacques-Evrard Bapst died in 1842 in Paris, France.

== Legacy ==
His lineage in the business continued through his son, Constant Bapst, and his grandson, Alfred Bapst. His grandson, Alfred Bapst, father of Germain Bapst, served as the final crown jeweler of the Second French Empire.

== Gallery ==
Works by Jacques-Evrard Bapst

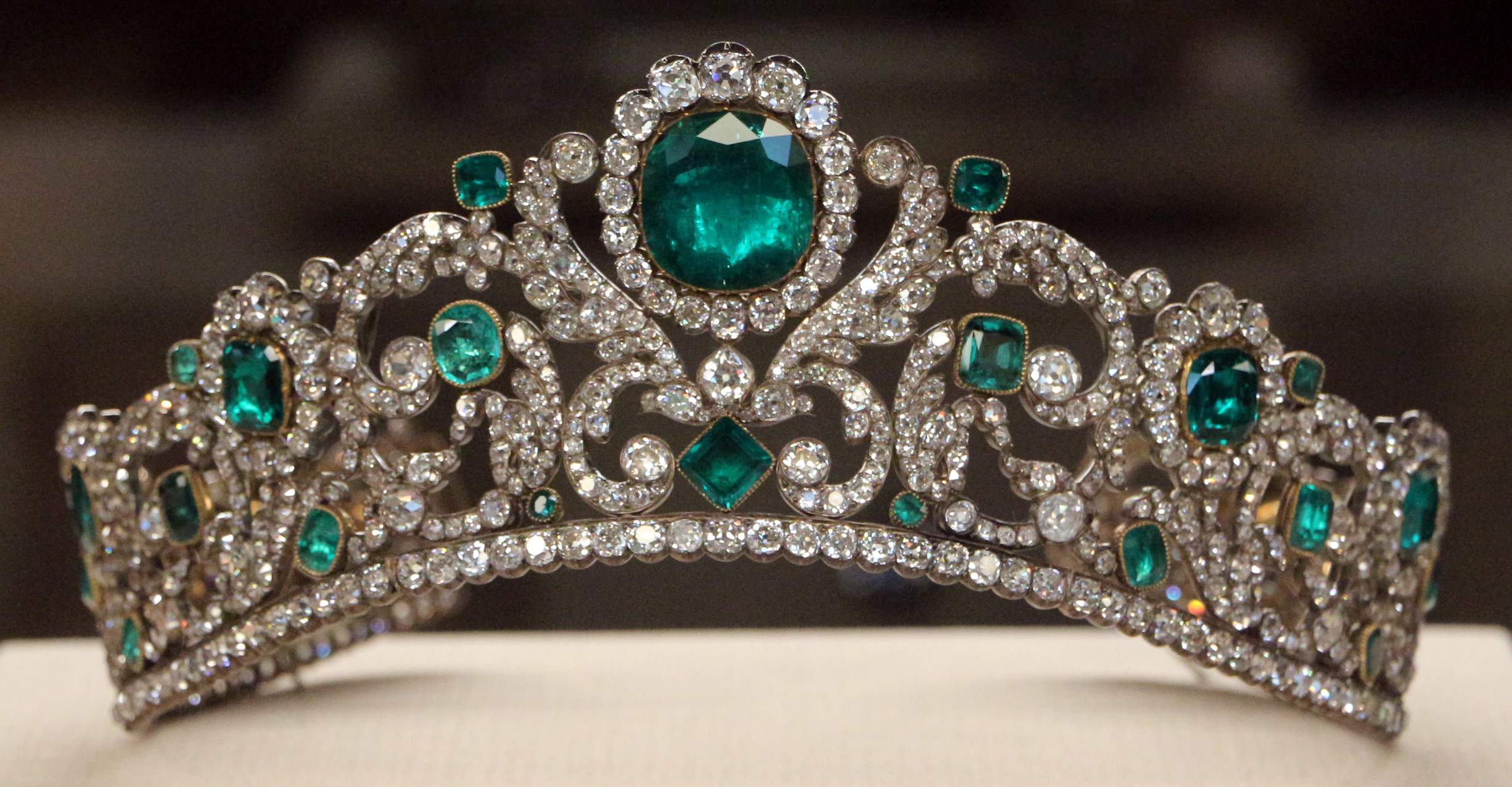
Diadem of the Duchess of Angoulême, c. 1819–1820

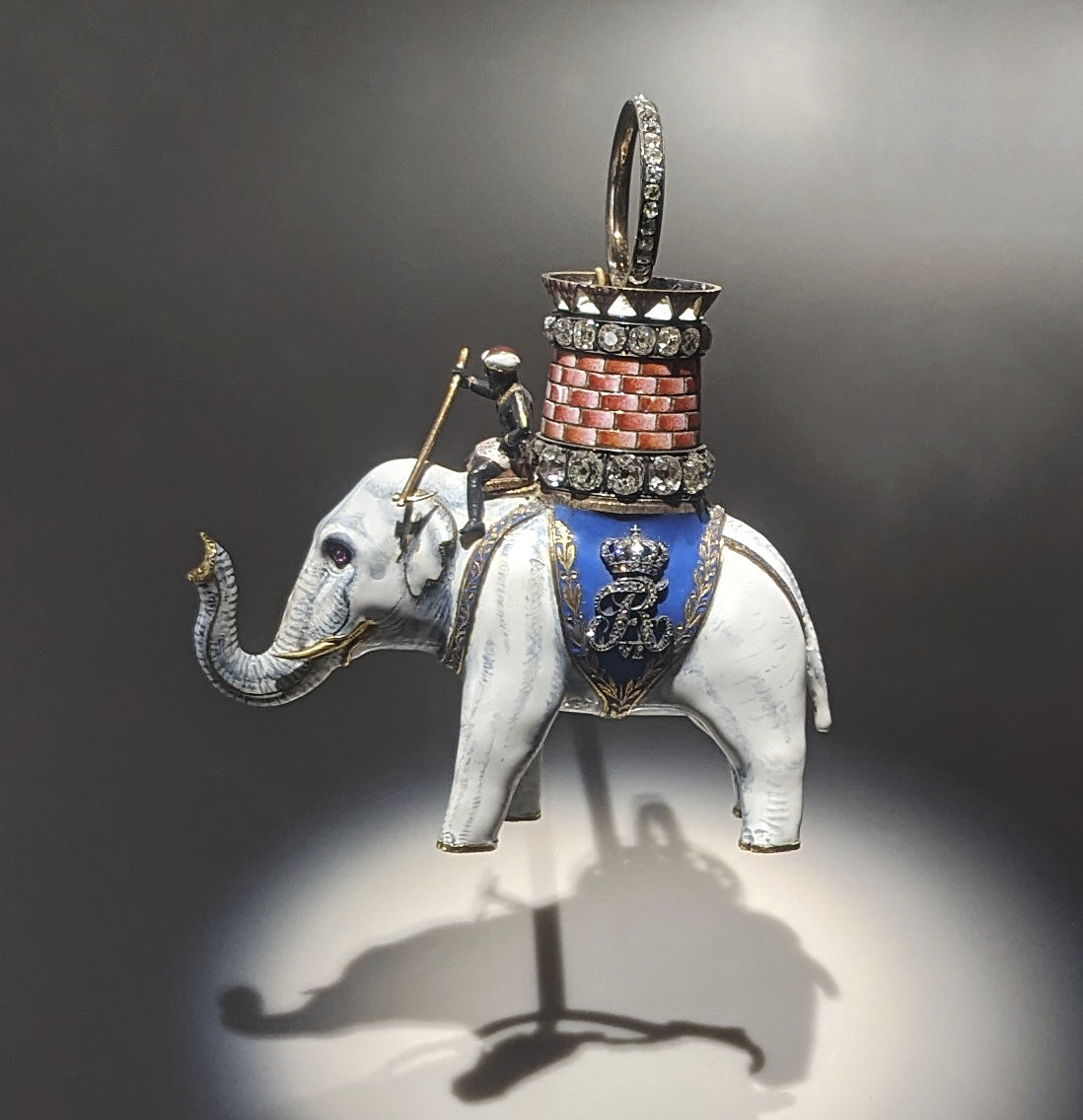
Badge of the Danish Order of the Elephant, c. 1822
