= Prix Thiers =

Annual prize given by the Académie française

The Prix Thiers (English: Thiers Prize) is an annual literary prize for history writing awarded by the Académie française since 1868.

== History ==
The Académie française, or French Academy, established the Prix Thiers in 1862. Founded by former French president and historian Adolphe Thiers, the annual literary award aimed to promote literature and historical writing.

In 1861, the French Academy awarded Adolphe Thiers, for his "History of the Consulate and the Empire," the biennial prize of 20,000 francs founded by the Emperor of France Napoleon III and intended to reward the work or discovery most likely to honor or serve the country. Thiers, through a notarial deed in 1862, founded a triennial prize of 3,000 francs, awarded to the author of a historical work recognized by the academy as deserving distinction. This prize became known as the Prix Thiers.

First awarded in 1868, the triennial prize of 3,000 francs recognized the most distinguished historical work published in the three years preceding 1 January 1868.

== See also ==
- Former prizes awarded by the Académie française
