= Émile Séraphin Vernier =

French sculptor

Émile-Séraphin Vernier
- Born: 16 October 1852; Paris, France
- Died: 9 September 1927 (aged 74); Paris, France
- Occupation: Engraver
- Known for: President of the Société des artistes décorateurs

Émile-Séraphin Vernier (16 October 1852 – 9 September 1927) was a French sculptor, metal worker, engraver and medalist. He was president of the Société des artistes décorateurs from 1905 to 1910. He later became an expert on antique jewelry in Egypt.

== Life ==
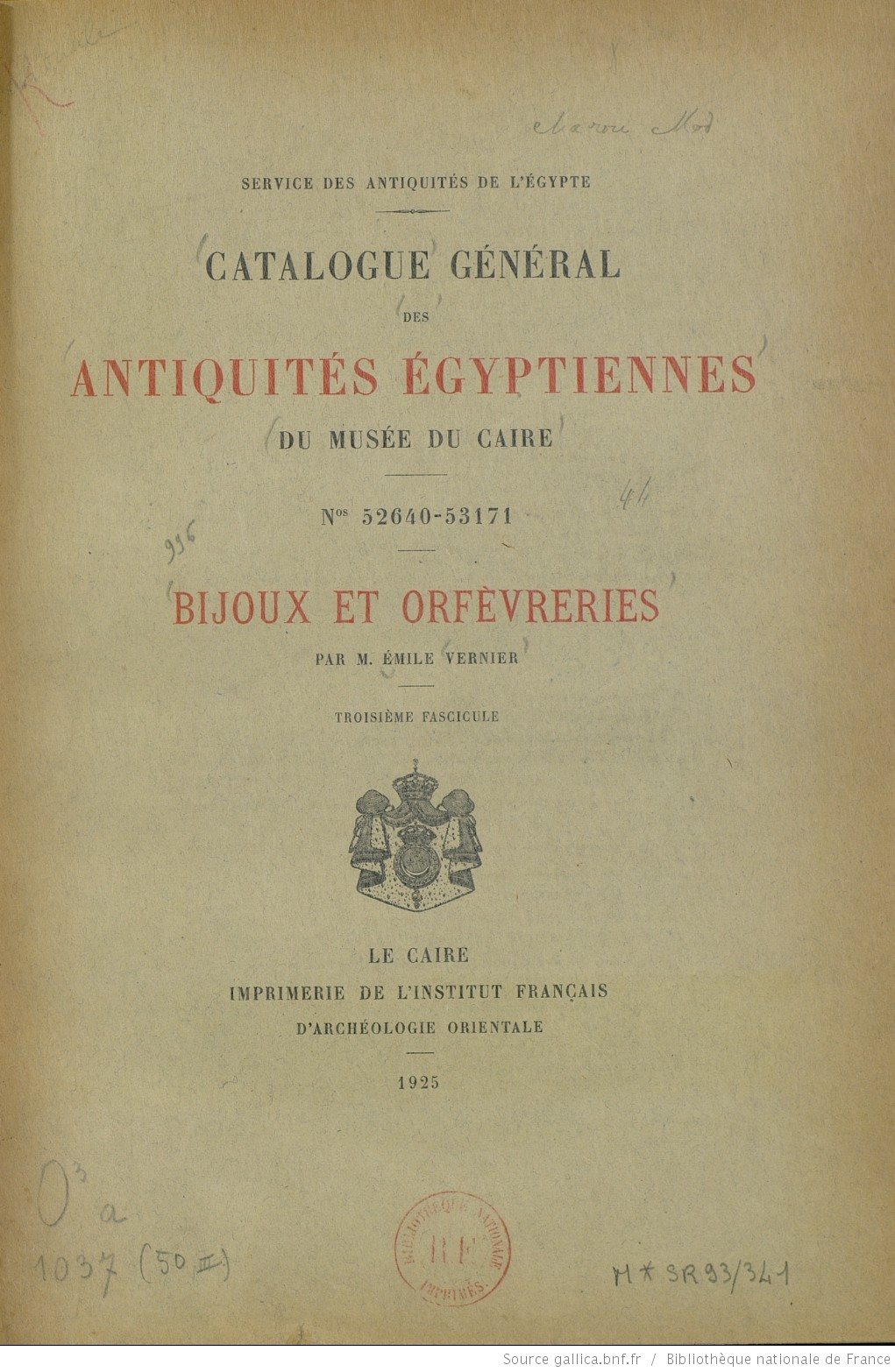

Émile-Séraphin Vernier was born in Paris on 16 October 1852. When he was aged 13 he was apprenticed to Poussielgue-Rusand, for whom he worked from 1865 to 1869. He studied sculpture, metal engraving and metal chasing. Vernier made jewelry for Bapst & Falize (1877–87), Froment-Meurice (1882–85), Vever (1888–92), Sandoz and Fonsèque et Olive. He was one of the first to apply the techniques of medal engraving to making jewelry. Vernier was distinguished as a sculptor, and was commissioned to make numerous commemorative plaques. His metal engravings also included allegorical subjects and architectural views.

Vernier first exhibited in Paris at the 1876 Salon. The 1886 Salon gave him an honorable mention, and he received an honorable mention at the Exposition Universelle (1889). He was esteemed as a lecturer on the goldsmith's art. Around the end of 1888 Vernier began to devote himself to making medals, which were used in brooches and pendants. In 1896–97 the French government gave him a special mission to Cairo to study the work of the antique Egyptian goldsmiths and jewelers. For his memoir on this subject the Académie des Inscriptions et Belles-Lettres gave him the prix Delalande-Guerineau. Vernier received a bronze medal at the Exposition Universelle (1900).

Vernier was made a Chevalier of the Legion of Honour in 1903 and an officer in 1911. He was a Member of the Council of the Société Nationale des Beaux-Arts. In 1905 he was elected president of the Société des artistes décorateurs for a five-year term. Vernier joined the Institut Français d'Archéologie Orientale in Cairo as a jewelry expert. In his catalog of jewelry and plates (Bijoux Et Orfèvreries) in the Cairo Museum, published in 1907–27, he described the way in which the gold objects in the museum had been made. This included descriptions of pre-dynastic objects found at Hierakonpolis, some of which had disintegrated when being cleaned.

Émile Vernier died in Paris on 9 September 1927. His work is held in many museums in Europe and North America.

== Publications ==
- Vernier, Émile Seraphin; Vernier, Émile Louis; Burty, Philippe (1870). Douze lithographies d'après Corot. Librairie artistique.
- Vernier, Emile-Séraphin (1907). Bijoux Et Orfèvreries. Institut Français d'archéologie orientale.
- Vernier, Emile-séraphin (1907). La bijouterie et la joaillerie égyptiennes. Institut Français d'archéologie orientale. p. 156.
- Vernier, Émile-Séraphin (1911). Notes sur les boucles d'oreilles égyptiennes.
- Vernier, Émile-Séraphin (1924). L'Or chez les anciens Egyptiens.
- Vernier, Émile; Service des Antiquités de l'Egypte (1927). Catalogue général des Antiquités égyptiennes du Musée du Caire. Vol. I: Bijoux et orfèvreries. Cairo: Institut français d'archéologie orientale.
- Vernier, Émile; Service des Antiquités de l'Egypte (1927). Catalogue général des Antiquités égyptiennes du Musée du Caire. Vol. II, Index et planches: Bijoux et orfèvreries. Cairo: Institut français d'archéologie orientale.

== Sources ==
- "Antique Art Nouveau French 18K Gold, Diamonds, Emile Vernier Cameo Stickpin". Ruby Lane.
- Arwas, Victor (2002). "Vernier, Émile Séraphin (1852-1927)". Art Nouveau: The French Aesthetic. Papadakis Publisher. ISBN 978-1-901092-37-0.
- Chavignerie, Émile Bellier de la; Auvray, Louis (1885). Dictionnaire général des artistes de l'école française, continué par L. Auvray.
- Hill, Marsha (2004). Royal Bronze Statuary from Ancient Egypt: With Special Attention to the Kneeling Pose. BRILL. ISBN 90-04-12399-7.
- Salon (1893). Explication des ouvrages de peinture, sculpture, architecture, gravure, dessins, modeles. Paul Dupont.
- "Séraphin Emile Vernier". Antique Jewelry University.
- Veldmeijer, André J. (2012). Tutankhamun's Footwear: Studies of Ancient Egyptian Footwear. Sidestone Press. ISBN 978-90-8890-076-1.
- Pr, Oxford Univ (2006). "VERNIER, Émile Séraphin (1852 - 1927), Sculptor, metal worker, engraver, medallist". Benezit Dictionary of Artists. ISBN 9780199773787.
