= Prix Thérouanne =

Annual prize given by the Académie française

The Prix Thérouanne is an annual prize for history writing awarded by the Académie française from 1869 to 1989.
