= Prix Marcelin Guérin =

Former annual prize given by the Académie française

The Prix Marcelin Guérin (English: Marcelin Guérin Prize) was an annual literary prize for history writing awarded by the Académie française from the 1872 to 1976.

== History ==
The Académie française, also known as the French Academy, created the Prix Marcelin Guérin in 1872. The annual literary prize, awarded by the Academy for the first time in 1874, was founded by the late Marcelin Guérin. Its purpose was to recognize newly produced works in history, eloquence, and literature that were most likely to bring distinction to France.

The prize was awarded for the first time to Alphonse Dantier for his work entitled "Italy, Historical Studies (2 vol.)" (French: L'Italie, études historiques). That year, the prize sum was valued at $4,000.

== See also ==
- Former prizes awarded by the Académie française
