= Arras-sur-Rhône =

- Commune
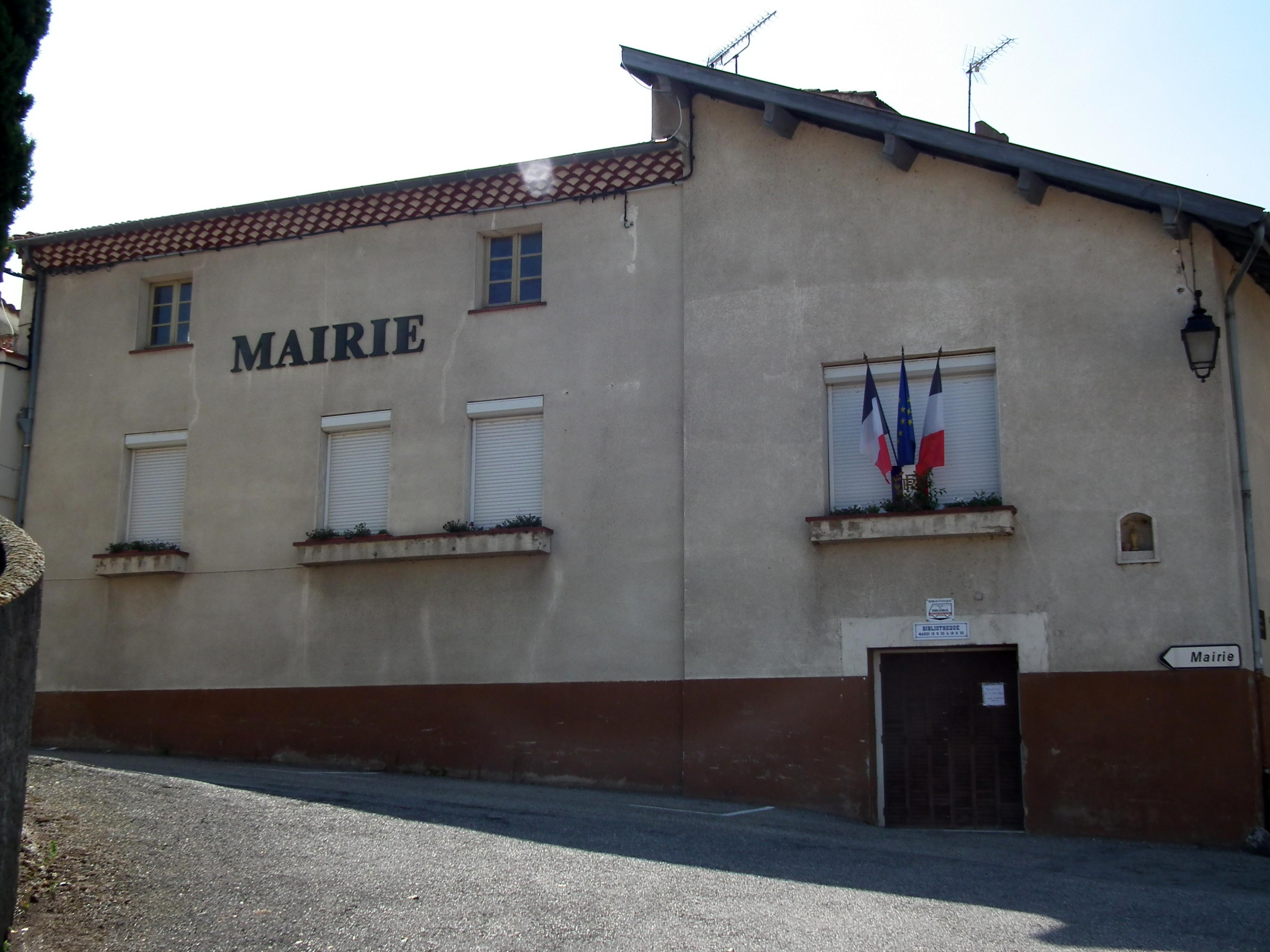
- Town hall
- Location of Arras-sur-Rhône
- Location within France Location within Auvergne-Rhône-Alpes
- Coordinates: 45°08′33″N 4°48′29″E
- Country: France
- Region: Auvergne-Rhône-Alpes
- Department: Ardèche
- Arrondissement: Tournon-sur-Rhône
- Canton: Sarras
- Intercommunality: CC Porte DrômArdèche

Government
  - Mayor (2020–2026): Jean-Marc Mouton
- Area^{1}: 5.89 km^{2} (2.27 sq mi)
- Elevation: 128 m (420 ft)
- Highest elevation: 388 m (1,273 ft)
- Lowest elevation: 117 m (384 ft)
- Population (2023): 529
  - Density: 89.8/km^{2} (233/sq mi)
- Time zone: UTC+01:00 (CET)
  - Summer (DST): UTC+02:00 (CEST)
- INSEE/Postal code: 07015 /07370
- ^{1} French Land Register data, which excludes lakes, ponds, glaciers > 1 km^{2} (0.386 sq mi or 247 acres) and river estuaries.

Arras-sur-Rhône (Occitan: Airàs-sus-Ròne) is a commune in the Ardèche department in the Auvergne-Rhône-Alpes region of southern France.

== Geography ==
Arras-sur-Rhône is located 2 km south of Saint-Vallier and 2 km north of Vion on the right bank of the Rhône. Access to the commune is by the D86 road from Ozon in the north passing down the length of the commune and through the village continuing south to Vion. The D800 road also goes south from the village crossing the Rhône via the Gervans Hydro-electric Dam to join National Highway N7 on the left bank. The Paris-Lyon-Marseille railway passes through the commune but there is no station. The nearest station is at Tournon-sur-Rhône to the south. The commune is mainly forests in the hills and farmland in the valley and along the Rhône with the village spread along the D86.

The Rhône forms the entire eastern border of the commune with the department of Drôme on the other side. A number of streams rise in the commune and flow down to the Rhône including the Ruisseau de la Tuillère, the Ruisseau de Bachasse, the Ruisseau d'Ozon, the Ruisseau des Marettes, and the Ruisseau de Pizon which forms the southern border of the commune.

== Toponymy ==
The village of Arras is mentioned for the first time in 987 as Villa Aratica. It then appears in various spellings such as:

- Villa Erattis 1050
- Erasio 1271
- Ras 1275
- Herasium/Heras 1282
- Herario 1400
- Heyras 1457
- Herras 1464
- Arrans 1576
- Heras 1617
- Arras 18th century
- Arras-sur-Rhône in 1918

The suffix -sur-Rhône was formalized by decree in 1925. Following the establishment of the railway, the name "Arras" was always confused with the city of Arras in the Pas-de-Calais.

Albert Dauzat qualified this name as "obscure".

== History ==
The first known lord of Arras was Sylvion d'Arras: according to a report dating from 1278 this lord owned the fief of tour brune. The village has seen many changes over time with the construction of the dam and the railway which resulted in numerous expropriations of land and the loss of local jobs.

Today the vineyard area of Arras is about 35 hectares against 100 hectares in 1956. In 1969 the Saint-Joseph AOC was established following a renovation plan for the vineyards dating from 1960. However the appellation zone was limited to the heights of the area in 1986. The main culture of the territory before the French Revolution was that of mulberries.

A Roman road passed through the village at the place called impasse de l’Ancienne Voie (Ancient Way cul-de-sac) where there are Milliaria indicating distances in Roman miles (1 mile was equivalent to 1.475 kilometres). Two were still in place and on one of them is the inscription "Millia Passum XXXI" = 31 Roman miles, or 48 kilometres which is the distance between Arras and Vienne but they were moved and sealed into the entrance to the courtyard of the castle museum of Tournon-sur-Rhône in 1939 and can no longer be moved. A main road has always passed through the village which is located on an important route between Lyon and Languedoc: first the Roman road then a royal road followed by an imperial road.

=== The Watermill ===
The Watermill was used to grind grain. It was installed in 1877 and was operational until 1943. Until the flour trade was successful, bread was the staple food of the population. A stone dam was built on the Ozon to retain water (at a place called la Levée) over a canal 200 metres wide with an iron wheel measuring 6m in diameter with which the fall of Water could drive a geared system. A valve system was used to regulate the flow rate. In 1935 the wheel was replaced by cylindrical machines and a diesel engine was also installed to ensure production even in times of low water. After World War II, the growing of wheat decreased and new modern mills were built.

=== The railway ===
The Paris-Lyon-Marseille line was built between 1848 and 1853. In 1879 two train stations were built: Vion and Sarras. It was not until 1897 that Arras station opened together with a line between Sécheras and Ozon. Today there is the Café de la halt on the location of the old station. There is also the inscription: ici on loge à pied ou à cheval (here one goes on foot or by horse) which is the location of the former postal relay. During the height of the station, 5-7 tons of fruit were transported by rail to Paris. In 1974 the station was destroyed following the construction of the dam. In 1978 the route was electrified in order to clear the left bank. The bridge over the river was built in 1876.

=== The fruit market ===
The fruit market was located on the square (Route du barrage), the last market took place in 1968 .

=== Other Historical Projects ===
The Dam

A project of the mid 1960s: on 26 June 1960 the first public meeting was held. The dam was built in the 3 years from 1969 to 1971. To do this 65 to 67 hectares of land were expropriated and Jamet island disappeared - an expanse of 12.58 hectares. The structure was built on a layer of clay (called "blue earth") in order to cope with the frequent flooding of the Rhône and support water speeds up to 7500 m3/s. The largest known flood occurred in 1856 when there were speeds of 6,100 m3/s. The largest observed flood was in 1957 with flows around 5,300 m3/s. The dam is 152 metres long and has 6 spillways 22 metres long and 12.8 metres high. Four sluice gates with shutters allow a water flow of 1,800 m3 per second. The lake to retain water for the dam extends for 20 km and it can store 3.24 million m3. It produces an average of 700 million kWh annually.

The hydroelectric power station of Gervans

It has 4 generating units of 30,000 KVA each. It uses water after the spillway of the dam passes through the canal.

The lock

The by-pass canal is 3.5 kilometres long and the lock is 12 metres wide and 195 metres long. The drop height varies between 9.8 and 11.55 metres following the low water of the Rhone. The total tonnage past the lock is 1,791,788 tonnes. The distribution of vessels using the lock is:

- merchant ships = 3,372;
- pleasure craft = 1,707;
- passenger vessels = 341;
- service vessels = 126;

a total of 5,546 ships in the year 1998. To ensure protection against floods the turbines can rotate at high speed without generating electricity. A project management structure allows it to work properly at low water: the reservoir level can be lowered to voluntarily make the turbines spin faster and produce more energy at a given time, especially during peak periods.

== Administration ==
List of Successive Mayors

From	To	Name
2001	2008	Jean Paul Guironnet
2008	2020	Brigitte Royer
2020	current	Jean-Marc Mouton

== Demography ==
The inhabitants of the commune are known as Arrageois or Arrageoises in French.

Historical population

Year	Pop.	±% p.a.
1793	422	—
1821	387	−0.31%
1846	548	+1.40%
1872	512	−0.26%
1901	506	−0.04%
1926	378	−1.16%
1946	402	+0.31%
1962	402	+0.00%
1968	401	−0.04%

Year	Pop.	±% p.a.
1975	332	−2.66%
1982	315	−0.75%
1990	351	+1.36%
1999	415	+1.88%
2007	487	+2.02%
2012	525	+1.51%
2017	520	−0.19%
2023	529	+0.29%

Source: EHESS and INSEE

== Sites and Monuments ==
A Roman Milestone in the cemetery is registered as an historical monument.

=== Remains of Arras Castle ===
The castle was organized around a high circular Keep called the Tower of Soubise or White Tower which is registered as an historical monument and is well preserved. Next to it was a square brown tower called "Joviac" of which only a wall remains. It is located on the top of a rocky outcrop overlooking the Rhône and the mouth of the valley of the Auzon. Today only a few walls remain to indicate the presence of the castle and the walls of the Keep. The Keep appears as a Saracen tower approximately 20 metres high and 6.1 metres in diameter. The granite rubble walls are 180 centimetres thick at the first level. The Keep may date from the first third of the 13th century. The two towers mark the presence of a co-lordship. An integral part of the defence system of the town, it guarded the entrance to the valley. It is possible that the site already played this role during Ancient Rome and the Romans would have used Arras as an aerarium (place to safeguard military treasure). Possession of the tower and the chateau gave the owners the right to levy tolls. The French Revolution abolished all tolls which removed any interest in the building and accelerated its erosion.

=== The Arras-sur-Rhône church ===
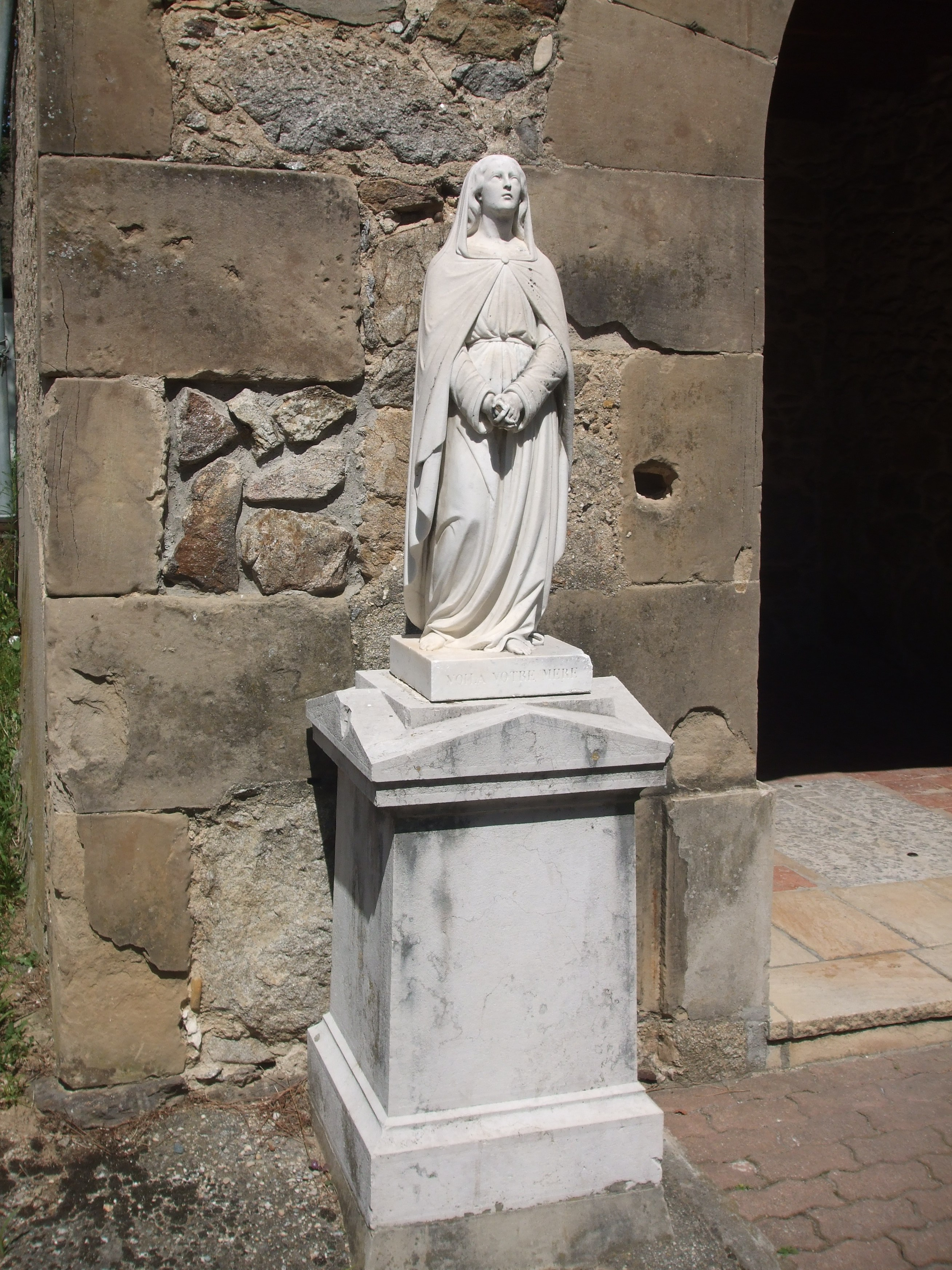
Statue of the Virgin Mary

The church was founded by Father De Pons d'Eyras. In 987 it was returned with the parish to the Abbey of Saint-Bernard of Romans, then passed to the Prior of the island of Saint-Vallier, and later to the Canons of Saint-Ruff (Diocese of Vienne) and the Archpriests of Saint-Félicien. Before the French Revolution, until 1790, the church and the priory house of Arras formed a whole with adjoining lands: 6400 m2 of vines, 1.7 hectares of land, and 7000 m2 of outcropping rocks.

In 1833 the bell tower was rebuilt with stone from the Guerrys quarry located one kilometre away on the old area of Ozon. Crussol Molasse was added to the stone. There followed many stages of restoration: in 1839 the roof was restored once, then a second time in 1900 with the rest of the frame, then a third time in 1988. During the years 1992 and 1993 the Interior was restored with tiles, ceilings and paintings. The walls of the old cemetery were destroyed to accommodate the square in 1959–1960. The patron saint of the parish is Saint-Clair. A remarkable mulberry tree is planted next to the church.

An ancient Gallo-Roman commemorative plaque in the church is listed as an historical object.

=== The ViaRhôna ===
The ViaRhôna cycling route from Geneva to the Mediterranean passes through the commune along the Rhone since 2014.

It passes from the bridge linking Saint-Vallier (26) and Arras (07) then successively the communes of Ozon, Arras-sur-Rhône, Tournon-sur-Rhone, then the woodland communes of Vion, Lemps, and Saint-Jean-de-Muzols where it crosses the Doux.

ViaRhôna.com

== Other places of interest ==
- The Communal wells, protected and maintained by the inhabitants as a valuable historical heritage of the town (located in Rue des Granges).
- Chalets and vineyard terraces are visible in the valley of the Ozon;
- The crosses in the village and a chair in carved walnut;
- The Ozon gorges have a meridional climate which explains the presence of Mediterranean-style vegetation with cacti, juniper, and also cicadas and scorpions. There are two hiking trails;
- The Museum displays tools used in old farming and winemaking and also old furniture and household goods;
- The Old Bridge: built before 1348 to avoid the use of the ford located at the end of the old Roman road and renovated in 1779;

== See also ==
- Communes of the Ardèche department
