= Chemin de fer du Vivarais =

Tourist railway in France

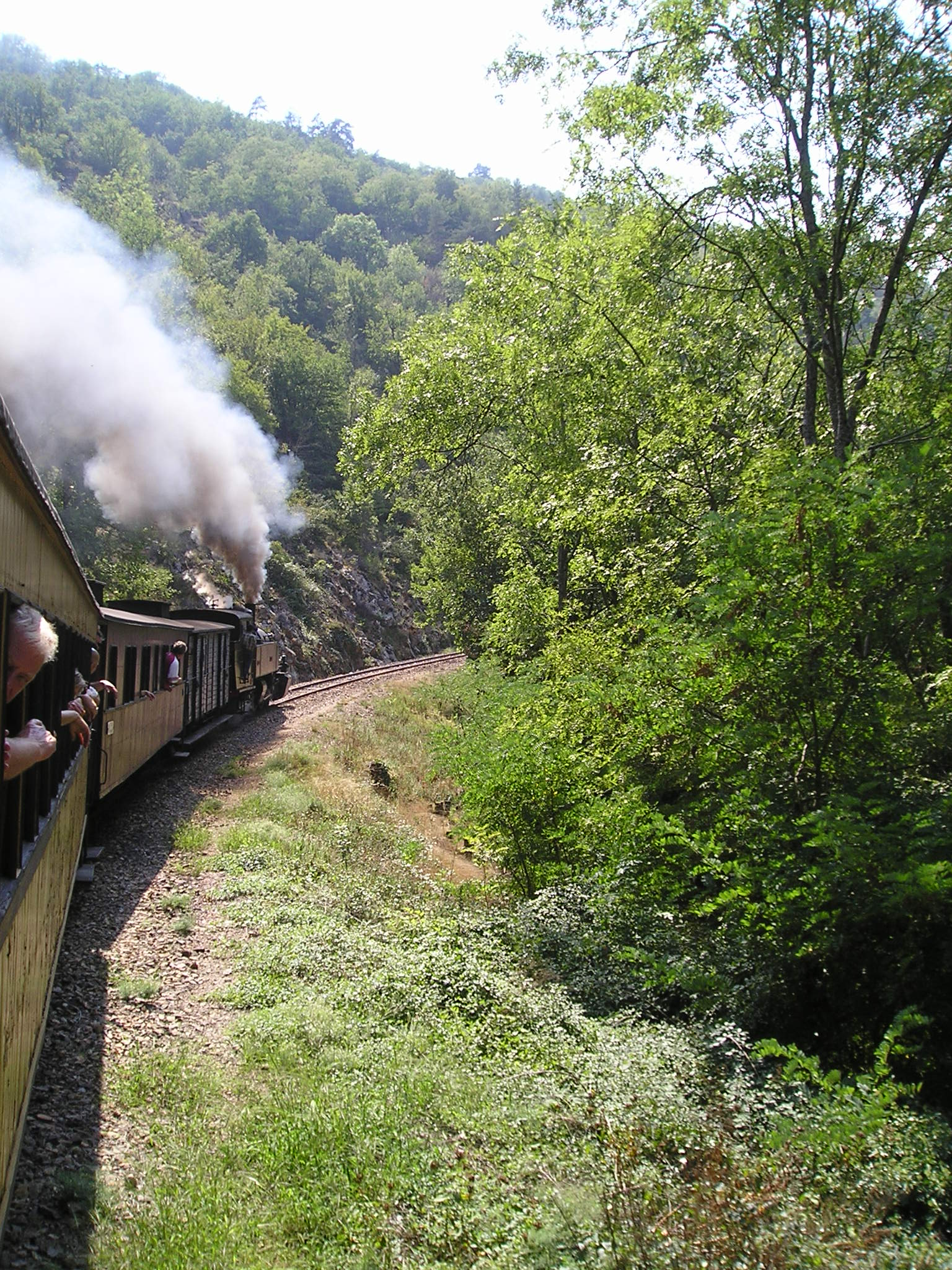
The train going to Lamastre

The Chemin de fer du Vivarais (French pronunciation: [ʃəmɛ̃ də fɛʁ dy vivaʁɛ], CFV) - often called Le Mastrou or Train de l'Ardèche - is a tourist railway in the Ardèche region of the South of France. The metre gauge line is 33 kilometres (21 mi) long. The railway is renowned for its historical steam locomotives in Mallet articulated locomotive style, as well as a collection of historic rolling stock and diesel railcars.

The line runs between Tournon, in the Rhône Valley, and Lamastre in the Doux valley. From Lamastre, the original line ran a further 19 kilometres (12 mi) to Le Cheylard. Originally opened on 12 July 1891, the line closed on 31 October 1968, and reopened as a heritage line the following year. In 2008, heritage services were suspended due to lack of funds to repair steam locomotives, among other issues. In 2013, steam returned to the Vivarais and services were resumed.

== History ==
A network of lines was constructed around Vivarais between 1898 and 1903. The network comprised:

- Lavoûte-sur-Loire - Yssingeaux - Raucoules-Brossettes (length 39.4 kilometres (24.5 mi))
- La Voulte-sur-Rhône - Le Cheylard (length 47.5 kilometres (29.5 mi))
- Tournon - Lamastre - Le Cheylard (length 52.2 kilometres (32.4 mi))
- Dunières -- Raucoules-Brossettes - Saint-Agrève - Le Cheylard (length 61 kilometres (38 mi))

When the Vivarais network closed in 1968, a group of enthusiasts decided to save part of the network and rolling stock. On 14 June 1969 a tourist operation started between Saint-Jean-de-Muzols and Lamastre. The Meyzieu Tourist Railway Company (CFTM) was created to operate the line, supported by the Association de soutien au Cheman de fer du Vivarais (SGVA), a group of volunteers who restore and maintain the rolling stock. It was not until February 1970 that access was restored to the railway station at Tournon, and the new Tournon - Lamastre line, 33 kilometres (21 mi) long, was officially opened on 18 April 1970.

In 1973 the company was forced to buy the rolling stock, track and stations, which made the CFTM one of the few French operators of tourist railways to own the infrastructure and rolling stock.

After operating without assistance for 35 years, the CFV searched for a partner. The department of Ardèche became majority shareholder of the CFV in 2004, when the realisation of the Joint Economic Society (SEM) to be substitutes resulted CFTM with the department's commitment to make a contribution of funds corresponding to the proportion of assets of CFTM. These flows of funds would be materialised in the form of investments on track and rolling stock.

However, these investments remained largely made on the equity of the company, thus creating an operating deficit. Although 7 km of track had been rebuilt, the steam locomotives - very expensive to maintain - were all in a state of disrepair at the beginning of the 2008 season. On 10 April 2008, the General Council of the Ardèche (the railway's majority shareholder) took the decision to suspend traffic for the remainder of the season.

Separately from this, another part of the original network, the section of the Dunières to Le Cheylard line between Dunières and Saint-Agrève, is currently operated by the Association des Voies Ferrées du Velay as the Velay Express.

== Re-opening efforts ==
2011 saw the introduction of a Vélorail service, using small cars on rails which are operated by the passenger like bicycles, but steam traction remained absent while the association continued to formulate an operating plan for the future of the railway.

In May 2012, the railway received a number of grants allowing work to commence in preparation for a steam service to return in the near future. As the railway was no longer permitted to operate on the dual-gauge section into Tournon, a new terminus station was constructed at Saint-Jean-de-Muzols, roughly 1.5 miles north of the historical terminus at Tournon.

For the first time in five years, a fire was lit in a steam locomotive in June 2013, when Mallet 030-030 no.403 (constructed in 1903, granted Monument Historique (MH) status in 1987) returned to steam after a brisk five-month overhaul at Lamastre. On 2 July 2013, the first passengers travelled behind no.403 as services resumed between Tournon Saint-Jean and Boucieu-le-Roi, a journey of around 16 km or 10 miles. This service operates daily throughout July and August (except Mondays), and weekends in September and October. Additionally, on Tuesdays during September and October, steam services will operate the full length of the line between Tournon Saint-Jean and the northern terminus of Lamastre, a journey of some 30 km. A second steam locomotive, Mallet 030-030 no.414 (constructed 1932), is currently being overhauled and is intended to join no.403 in service in the near future.

== Shared formation with the SNCF ==
Until the suspension of services in 2008, trains departed from the SNCF railway station at Tournon. Between here and Saint-Jean-de-Muzols, Vivarais trains operated along a dual gauge section of track shared with SNCF services for a length of 2.2 kilometres (1.4 mi). This section includes two tunnels and a viaduct. This line was opened by the PLM in the summer of 1879. As of 2013, this section of line is bypassed by Vivarais trains, which now begin at the new Saint-Jean-de-Muzols terminus.

== Stations ==
- Tournon, altitude: 123 metres (404 ft) (all quoted distances are from Tournon)
- Saint-Jean-de-Muzols (2.6 kilometres (1.6 mi))
- Troyes (7 kilometres (4.3 mi))
- Mordane (9 kilometres (5.6 mi))
- Clauzel (11 kilometres (6.8 mi))
- Colombier-le-Vieux / Saint-Barthélemy-le-Plain (13 kilometres (8.1 mi))
- Boucieu-le-Roi (18.5 kilometres (11.5 mi)), altitude: 276 metres (906 ft)
- Tincey (19 kilometres (12 mi))
- Arlebosc (22 kilometres (14 mi))
- Le Garnier (24 kilometres (15 mi))
- Le Plat-Empurany (26.1 kilometres (16.2 mi))
- Lamastre (32.6 kilometres (20.3 mi)), altitude: 373 metres (1,224 ft)

== Bridges and tunnels ==
The CFV has 3 viaducts crossing the River Doux:

- de Troyes, (6 kilometres (3.7 mi)) with 4 20 metres (66 ft) arches.
- d’Arlebosc, (21 kilometres (13 mi)) with 5 12 metres (39 ft) arches.
- du Garnier, (23 kilometres (14 mi)) with 6 12 metres (39 ft) arches.

... and one tunnel:

- Mordane, (9 kilometres (5.6 mi)) 265 metres (869 ft) in length.

In addition, the dual-gauge SNCF section, has:

- 2 tunnels under the city of Tournon, of 640 metres (2,100 ft) and 40 metres (130 ft) length.
- 1 viaduct over the River Doux, 165 metres (541 ft) long.

== Popular culture ==
- The IMDb lists the Chemain de fer du Vivarais as a filming location for François Truffaut's 1971 film, Two English Girls.
