= Plats, Ardèche =

Plats
- Commune
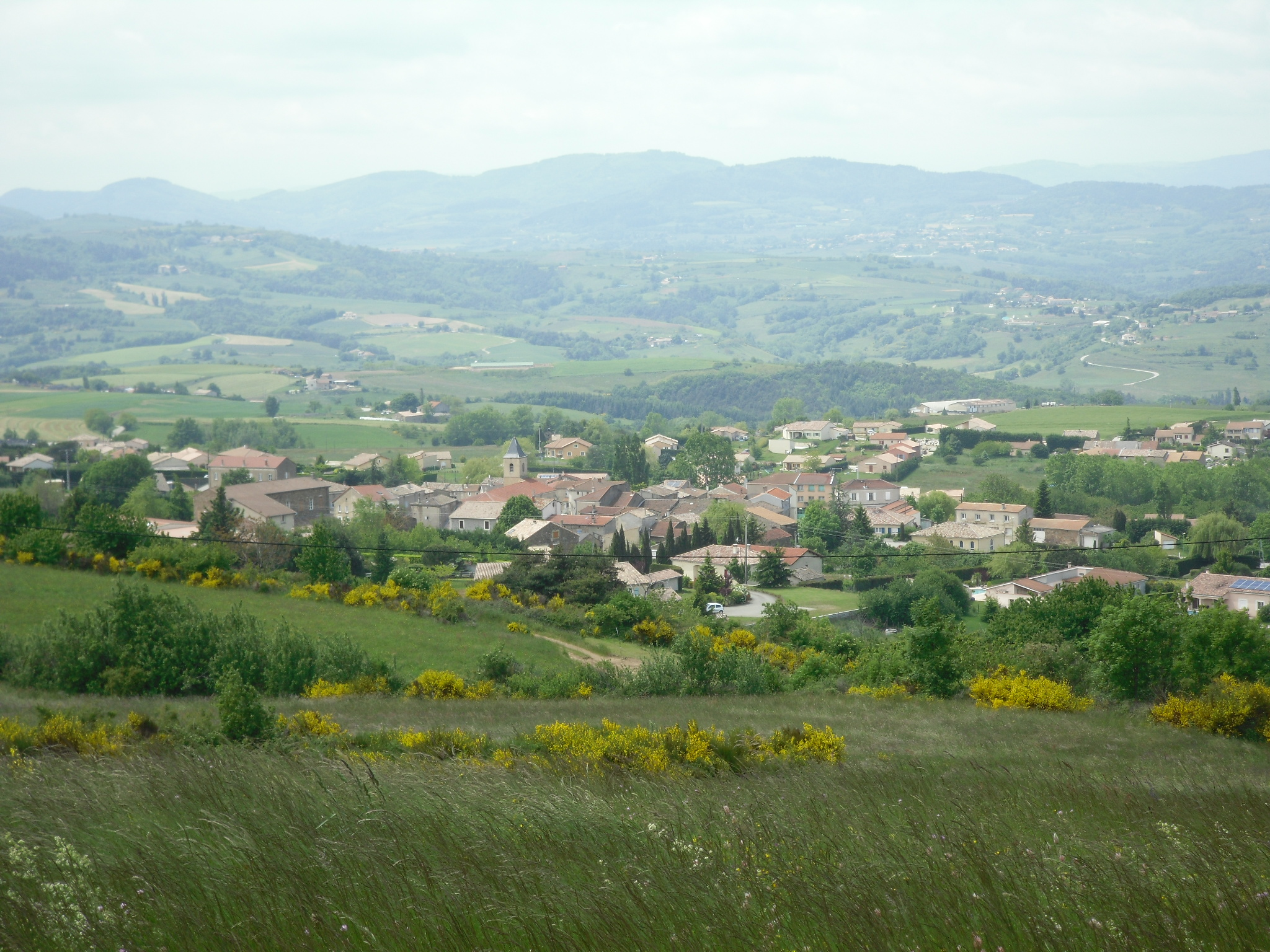
- A view of the village of Plats
- Location of Plats
- Location within France Location within Auvergne-Rhône-Alpes
- Coordinates: 45°00′39″N 4°46′59″E
- Country: France
- Region: Auvergne-Rhône-Alpes
- Department: Ardèche
- Arrondissement: Tournon-sur-Rhône
- Canton: Tournon-sur-Rhône
- Intercommunality: CA Arche Agglo

Government
  - Mayor (2021–2026): Régis Reynaud
- Area^{1}: 16.25 km^{2} (6.27 sq mi)
- Elevation: 460 m (1,510 ft)
- Highest elevation: 543 m (1,781 ft)
- Lowest elevation: 178 m (584 ft)
- Population (2023): 828
  - Density: 51.0/km^{2} (132/sq mi)
- Time zone: UTC+01:00 (CET)
  - Summer (DST): UTC+02:00 (CEST)
- INSEE/Postal code: 07177 /07300
- Website: (in French) www.plats.fr
- ^{1} French Land Register data, which excludes lakes, ponds, glaciers > 1 km^{2} (0.386 sq mi or 247 acres) and river estuaries.

Plats (French pronunciation: [pla]; Occitan: Plat) is a commune in the Ardèche department in southern France.

== Population ==
Historical population
Year	Pop.	±% p.a.
1968	350	—
1975	321	−1.23%
1982	381	+2.48%
1990	443	+1.90%
1999	509	+1.56%
2007	733	+4.66%
2012	809	+1.99%
2017	854	+1.09%
2023	828	−0.51%
Source: INSEE

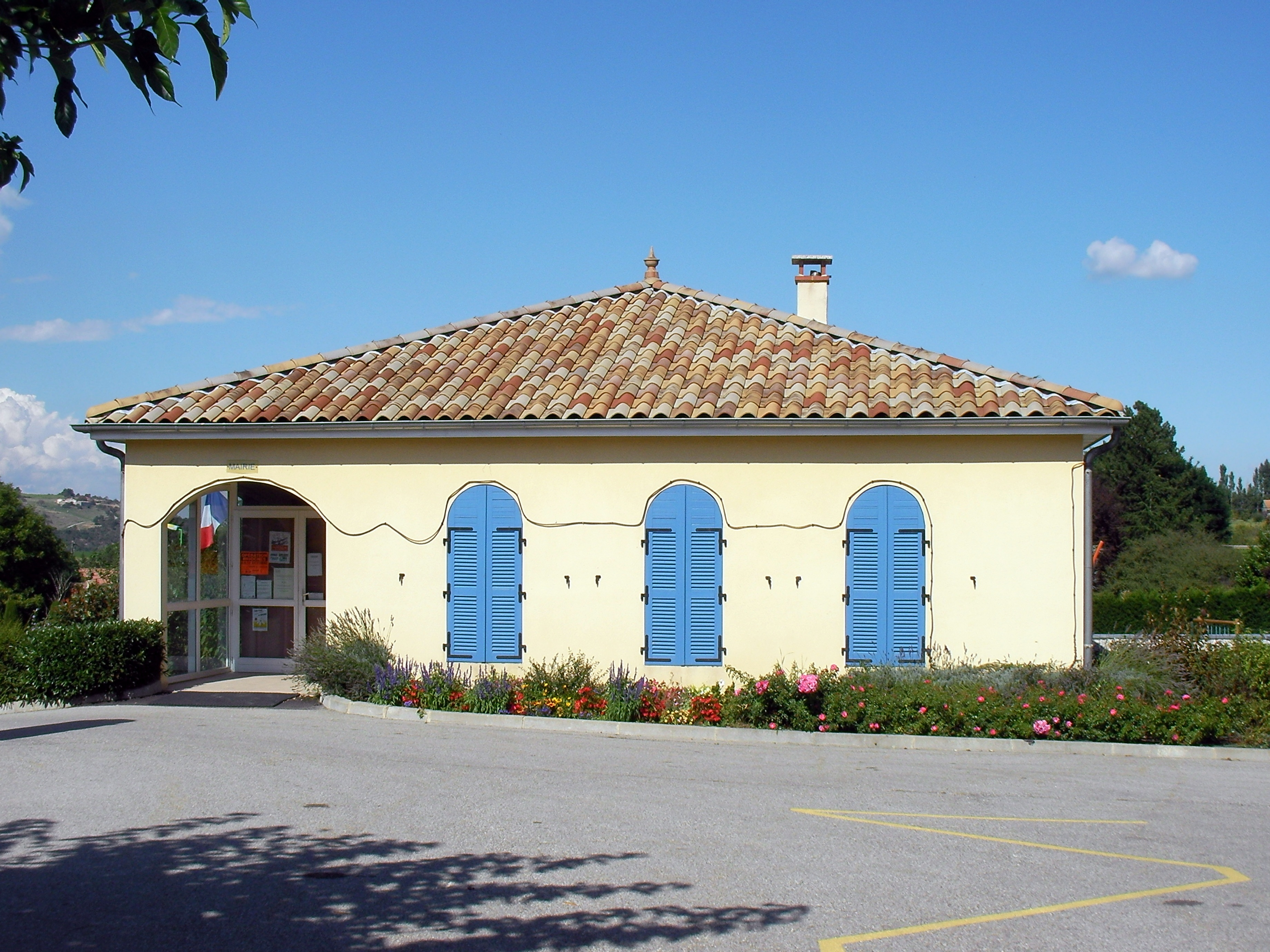
Town hall

== Toponymy ==
Plats was called Planum in 1275, Plana in XIV^{e}, Plais in XVIII^{e}, then it was called Plas and Plats. The name of the town is written プラ in Japanese, Пла in Russian and 쁠라 in Korean.

== Town planning ==
=== Housing ===
Evolution of housing between 1968 and 2017.
1968	1975	1982	1990	1999	2007	2012	2017
134	170	183	198	240	311	345	371

== Personalities linked to Plats ==
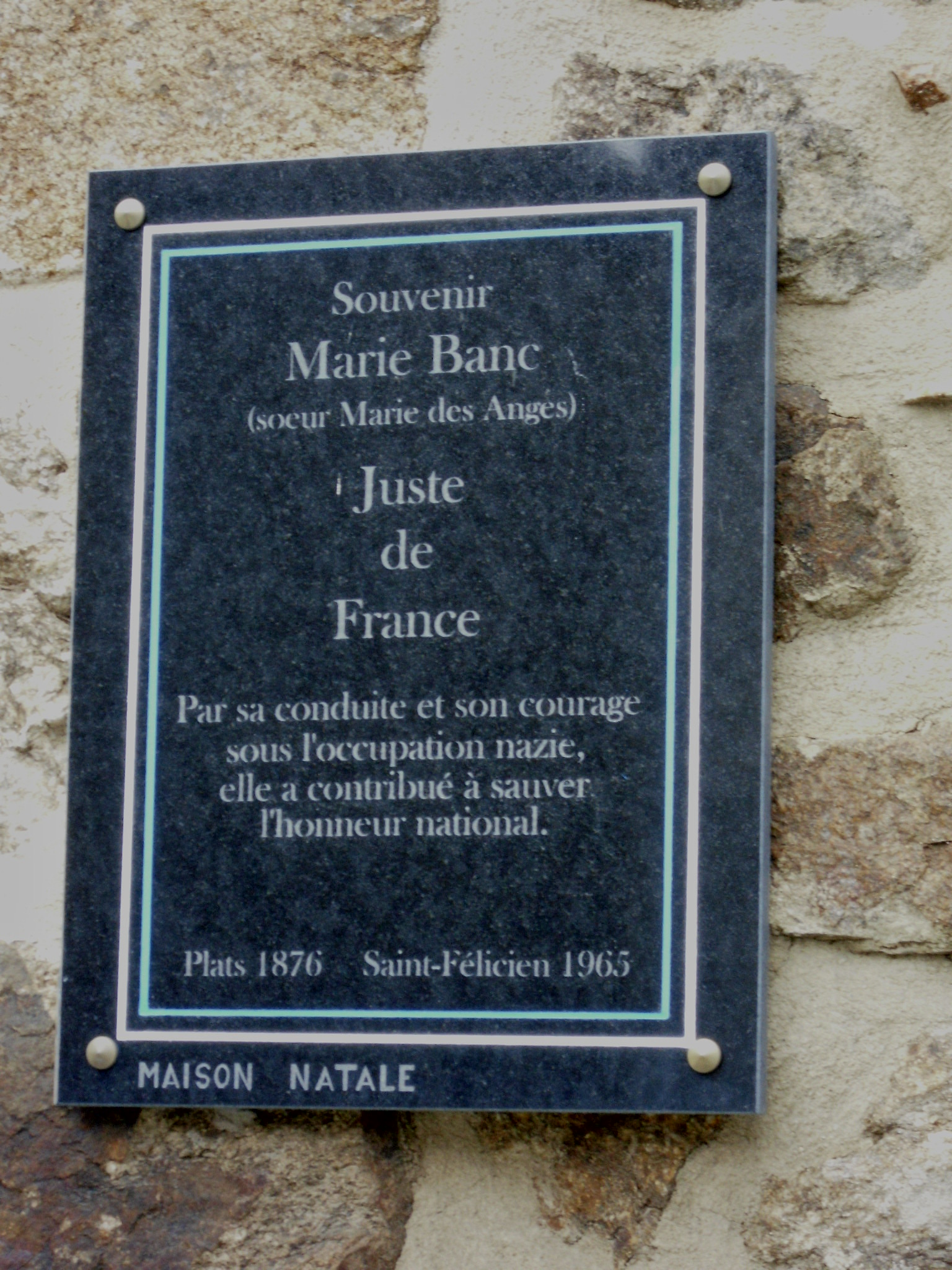
Commemorative plaque for Marie Banc (Sister Mary of the Angels) at the house of her birth in Plats.

- Marie-France Banc (1876 - 1965), Righteous Among the Nations. She was born in Plats and died in Saint-Félicien.

== See also ==
- Communes of the Ardèche department
