= RhB C4 2271–2281 =

RhB C^{4} 2271–2281
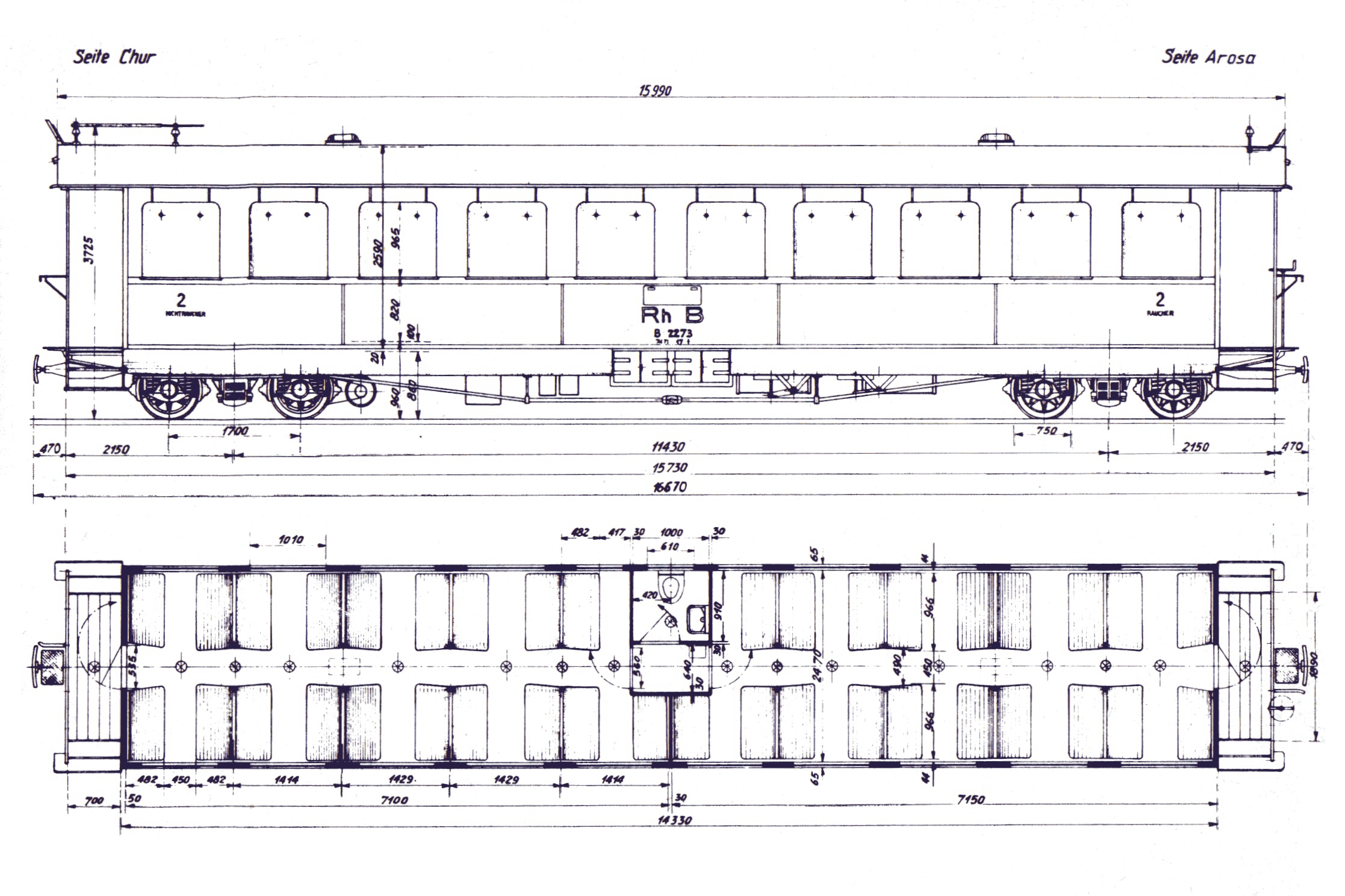
- Technical drawing
- In service: 1946–19xx
- Manufacturer: Rhaetian Railway
- Built at: Rhaetian Railway main workshop in Landquart
- Constructed: 1946–1951
- Operator: Rhaetian Railway

Specifications
- Car body construction: Steel sheet cladding wooden body, Body-on-frame, non-integral
- Car length: 16,670 mm (54 ft 8 1/4 in)
- HVAC: electric
- Bogies: Schindler SWP 49
- Braking system: automatic vacuum
- Coupling system: centre-buffer coupling with two lateral screwlink coupler
- Track gauge: 1,000 mm (3 ft 3 3/8 in)

The C^{4} 2271–2281 of the metre-gauge Rhaetian Railway (RhB), designated B 2271–2281 following the 1956 classification reform, are passenger carriages with a steel sheet-clad wooden body, open boarding platforms and a central aisle. They were primarily intended for the Chur–Arosa railway line, which was built and, until 1942, also operated by the Chur–Arosa Railway (ChA), but could also be found throughout the main network. Two carriages have been preserved by French heritage railways.

== History ==
The eleven carriages were built between 1946 and 1951 by the Rhaetian Railway itself at its main workshop in Landquart. In doing so, well-preserved components from the 22 two-axle C 2034–2055 carriages built by Schweizerische Wagons- und Aufzügefabrik AG Schlieren-Zürich (SWS) – part of the C 2028–C 2055 series, originally designated C 228–255 and dating from 1903 – were reused.

The carriages offered 76 seats on wooden benches, arranged in ten relatively narrow compartments with vis-à-vis seating and a 2+2 seating configuration. The compartments were incomplete around the spartan toilet in the centre of the carriage, which was fitted with a drop chute toilets typical of the time and a washbasin. The carriages feature a truss frame and two new Schindler SWP 49 (SWP for Schindler Waggon Pratteln) bogies with coil springs for the primary suspension and transverse leaf springs for the secondary suspension. The skirts on the longitudinal beams gave the carriages a contemporary appearance.

The carriages are fitted with a centre-buffer coupling with two lateral screwlink coupler, as well as a vacuum brake, which, as a distinctive feature, consists of two air reservoirs and brake cylinders in each case. They are fitted with frameless, retractable windows and electric lighting using incandescent bulbs, which are powered by a 36 volt direct current battery charged by an axle driven generator.

The first carriages to be built, numbers 2271–2278, were fitted with roof-rod couplers for the electric heating line on the Chur–Arosa route, which at that time was still electrified with 2,400 volts DC. They were also fitted with a heating line for an electric heating system operating at 300 volts AC on the main network. The three further carriages, numbers 2279–2281 from 1951, did not, however, have roof-rail couplers, but were fitted only with an electric heating system operating at 300 volts AC, as they were primarily intended for the main network.

Following the withdrawal of the last two-axle carriages, carriages 2271–2281 were used only for less important trains, that is, as additional carriages on passenger trains, on the Bergün/Bravuogn–Preda toboggan trains, and as accompanying carriages (caboose) on all-freight trains or on goods train with passenger servic.

== Donor vehicles ==
The table lists the respective donor vehicles. The side members, parts of the interior fittings, air reservoirs and brake cylinders were reused in a modified form, with each four-axle vehicle having two air reservoirs and two brake cylinders:

- C 2047 and C 2048 to C^{4} 2271
- C 2049 and C 2050 to C^{4} 2272
- C 2034 and C 2035 to C^{4} 2273
- C 2036 and C 2041 to C^{4} 2274
- C 2043 and C 2046 to C^{4} 2275
- C 2054 and C 2055 to C^{4} 2276
- C 2037 and C 2039 to C^{4} 2277
- C 2044 and C 2051 to C^{4} 2278
- C 2038 and C 2040 to C^{4} 2279
- C 2042 and C 2044 to C^{4} 2280
- C 2052 and C 2053 to C^{4} 2281

== Colour schemes used by the Rhaetian Railway ==
- 1947–1956: Green and cream colour scheme, with the front panels painted entirely green. Lettering in white. The letters ‘Rh B’ in white in the centre of the carriage’s long side.
- 1957 to 1986. As of 2026, it cannot be verified when the passenger carriages changed their colour scheme from green/cream to green, nor whether this applied to all carriages.<ref>B2 2075–2078 der Rhätischen Bahn von 1952, die letzten Zweiachser, ein Thread aus dem Jahre 2019 im Forum Drehscheibe Online, Zitat: Auch der B^{2} However, it is considered certain that the Rhaetian Railway was still repainting carriages in green/cream as late as the 1970s.[2] Lettering in white; ‘Rh B’ initially in white, then in yellow.

== Where have all the passenger carriages gone? ==
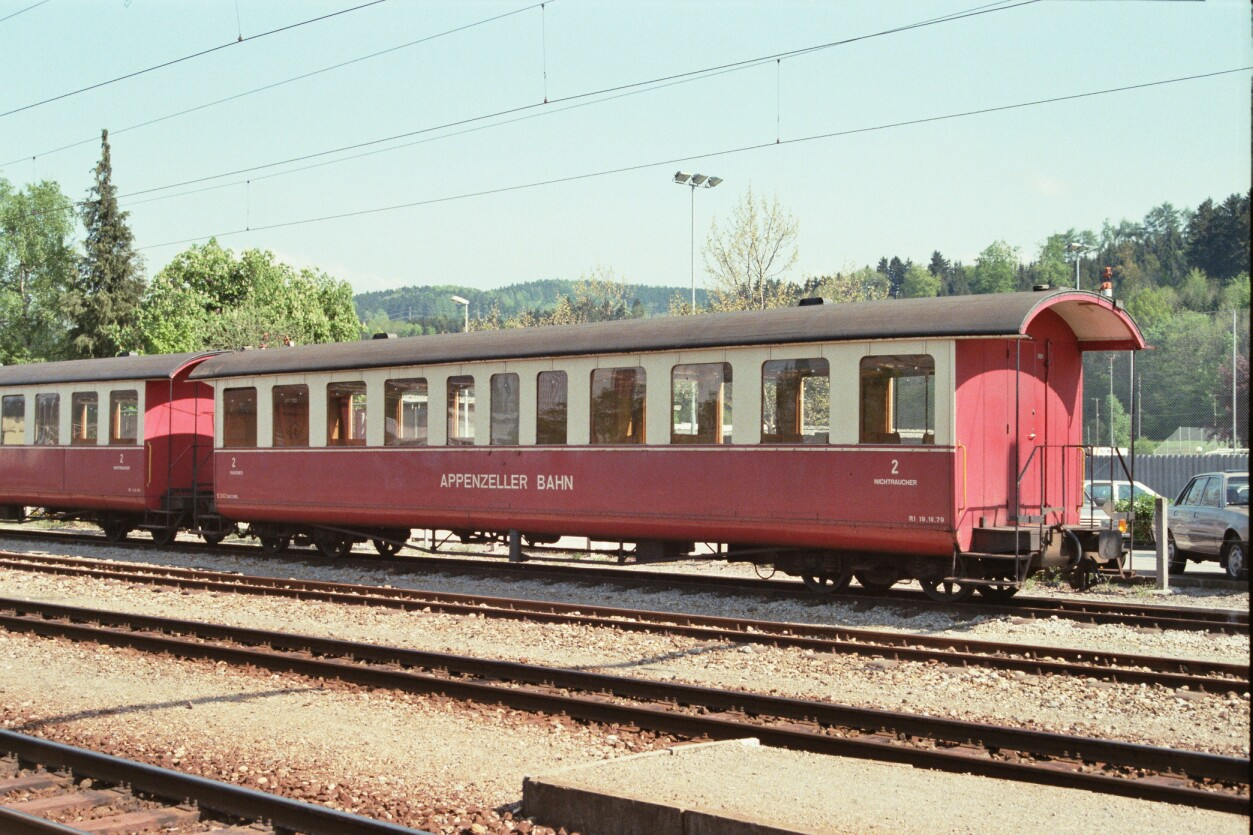
B 241 and B 242 of the AB in Gossau, 1986

The B 2271 and 2272 were transferred to the Appenzell Railways (AB) in 1979 as the B 13 and 14. They were authorised to run at 75 km/h on that line. Initially, the carriages were still in service in their green livery, but were soon repainted in red and cream, with the fronts entirely red. The lettering ‘Appenzeller Bahn’ was written entirely in capital letters. In 1985, the designations B 13 and 14 were changed to B 241 and 242, as two refurbished two-axle carriages from the Säntis Railways (SB), dating from 1912 and bearing the old designations C 13 and C 14, were returned to service that year.

The B 2273 was transferred to the Chemin de fer de La Mure (SGLM) in France in 1979. There, it was designated B 202. In 1998, it was transferred to the Velay-Express and redesignated Bfv 202.

The B 2274 was scrapped in 1983, whilst the B 2275–2281 were scrapped in 1985. Their bogies were used in the construction of the low costs carriages for peak season of the Rhaetian Railway, the B 2261–2271.

In 1987, the AB B 241, formerly RhB B 2271, was scrapped.

The AB B 242, formerly RhB B 2272, was transferred to the Chemin de fer de La Mure (SGLM) in France in 1993. There, it retained the designation B 242. In 2021, it was transferred to the Chemin de fer du Vivarais (CFV). There, too, it retained the designation B 242.

== Bibliography ==
- Claude Jeanmaire: Die elektrischen und Diesel-Triebfahrzeuge schweizerischer Eisenbahnen. Dritter Teil: Die Rhätische Bahn (Stammnetz). Archiv Nr. 19, Verlag Eisenbahn, Villingen 1973, ISBN 3-85649-019-1 (in German)
