= Lemps =

Lemps may refer to the following places in France:

- Lemps, Ardèche, a commune in the department of Ardèche
- Lemps, Drôme, a commune in the department of Drôme
- Le Grand-Lemps, a commune in the department of Isère
