= Vion =

Vion may refer to:

- Vion NV, European meat processor
- FC ViOn Zlaté Moravce, a football team from Zlaté Moravce in Slovakia
- Michel Vion, French alpine skier
- places in France:
  - Vion, Ardèche, a commune in the department of Ardèche
  - Vion, Sarthe, a commune in the department of Sarthe

== See also ==
- Voies, a former municipality in Greece, sometimes spelled Vion
