= Cheminas =

- Commune
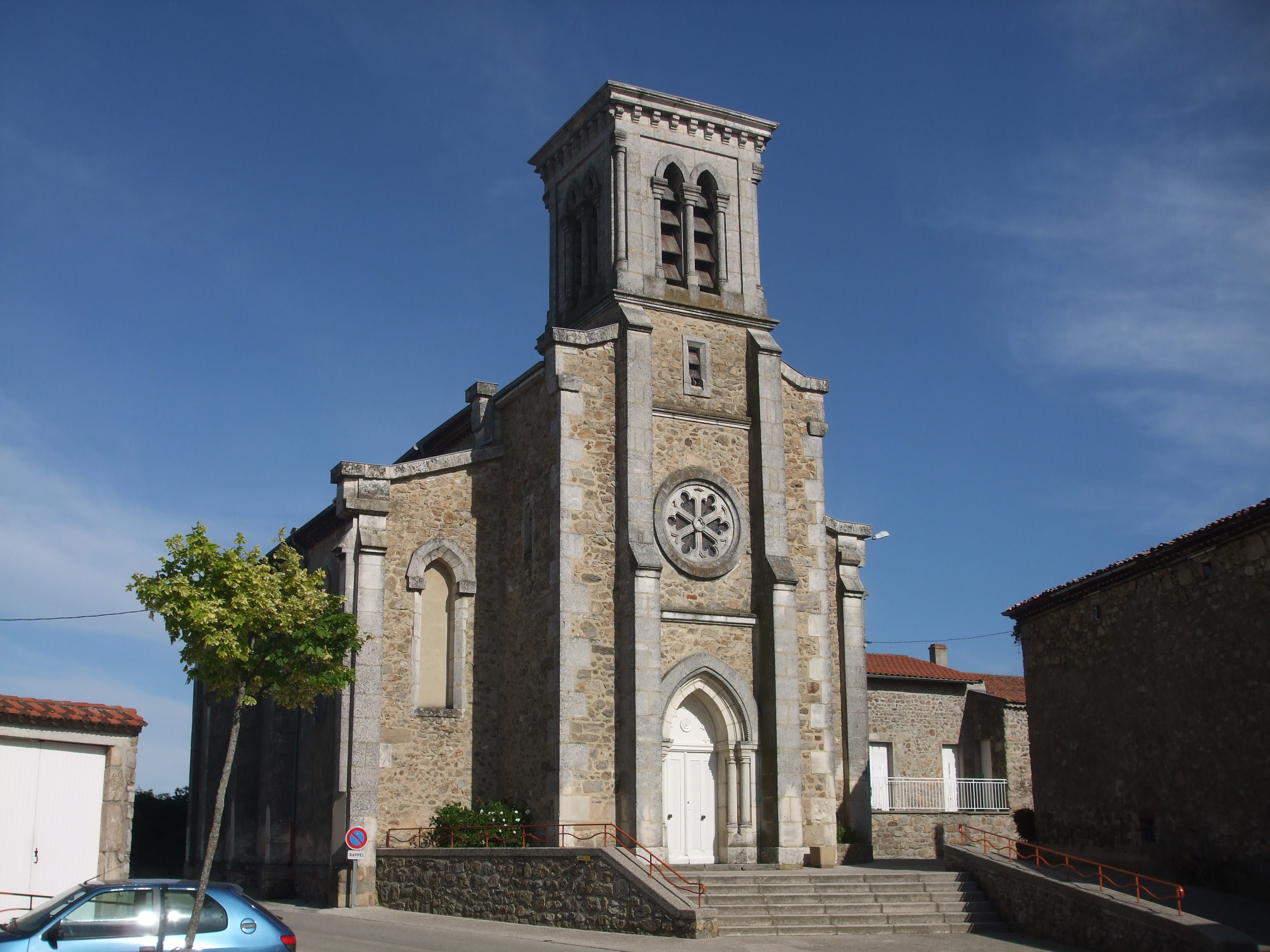
- The church in Cheminas
- Location of Cheminas
- Location within France Location within Auvergne-Rhône-Alpes
- Coordinates: 45°07′30″N 4°45′07″E
- Country: France
- Region: Auvergne-Rhône-Alpes
- Department: Ardèche
- Arrondissement: Tournon-sur-Rhône
- Canton: Tournon-sur-Rhône
- Intercommunality: CA Arche Agglo

Government
  - Mayor (2020–2026): Christiane Ferlay
- Area^{1}: 9.39 km^{2} (3.63 sq mi)
- Elevation: 460 m (1,510 ft)
- Highest elevation: 563 m (1,847 ft)
- Lowest elevation: 352 m (1,155 ft)
- Population (2023): 423
  - Density: 45.0/km^{2} (117/sq mi)
- Time zone: UTC+01:00 (CET)
  - Summer (DST): UTC+02:00 (CEST)
- INSEE/Postal code: 07063 /07300
- ^{1} French Land Register data, which excludes lakes, ponds, glaciers > 1 km^{2} (0.386 sq mi or 247 acres) and river estuaries.

Cheminas (Occitan: Caminas) is a commune in the Ardèche department in southern France.

== Population ==
Historical population
Year	Pop.	±% p.a.
1968	270	—
1975	212	−3.40%
1982	206	−0.41%
1990	193	−0.81%
1999	226	+1.77%
2007	258	+1.67%
2012	328	+4.92%
2017	402	+4.15%
2023	423	+0.85%
Source: INSEE

== See also ==
- Communes of the Ardèche department
