= Étables =

- Commune
- Location of Étables
- Location within France Location within Auvergne-Rhône-Alpes
- Coordinates: 45°06′07″N 4°43′34″E
- Country: France
- Region: Auvergne-Rhône-Alpes
- Department: Ardèche
- Arrondissement: Tournon-sur-Rhône
- Canton: Tournon-sur-Rhône
- Intercommunality: CA Arche Agglo

Government
  - Mayor (2020–2026): Pascal Seignovert
- Area^{1}: 15.7 km^{2} (6.1 sq mi)
- Elevation: 440 m (1,440 ft)
- Highest elevation: 563 m (1,847 ft)
- Lowest elevation: 178 m (584 ft)
- Population (2023): 1,000
  - Density: 64/km^{2} (160/sq mi)
- Time zone: UTC+01:00 (CET)
  - Summer (DST): UTC+02:00 (CEST)
- INSEE/Postal code: 07086 /07300
- ^{1} French Land Register data, which excludes lakes, ponds, glaciers > 1 km^{2} (0.386 sq mi or 247 acres) and river estuaries.

Étables (French pronunciation: [etabl]; Occitan: Estables) is a commune in the Ardèche department in the Auvergne-Rhône-Alpes region in southern France.

== Population ==
Historical population
Year	Pop.	±% p.a.
1968	468	—
1975	426	−1.33%
1982	468	+1.35%
1990	483	+0.40%
1999	553	+1.52%
2007	723	+3.41%
2012	848	+3.24%
2017	906	+1.33%
2023	1,000	+1.66%
Source: INSEE

== See also ==
- Communes of the Ardèche department
