= Marie-France Banc =

- Born: 30 May 1876; Plats, Ardèche, France
- Died: 27 March 1965 (aged 88); Saint-Félicien, France
- Other name: Sister Mary of the Angels
- Occupations: Nun, Mother Superior
- Known for: Righteous Among the Nations

Marie-France Banc (30 May 1876 – 27 March 1965) was a Catholic Mother Superior in France, recognized as Righteous Among the Nations, for protecting two Jewish children for the last two years of World War II.

== Biography ==
Born on 30 May 1876 in Plats, Ardèche, Banc entered religious life as a novitiate nun at 17 and received the name “Sister Marie des Anges” (Sister Mary of the Angels). In time, she taught in Saint-Victor, Arras (Pas-de-Calais), Saint-Félicien (Ardèche) and Arlebosc.

In 1942, Marie Banc was the Mother Superior of the Saint-Joseph Convent in Saint-Félicien, where she was responsible for two boarding schools, one for boys and one for girls. In December of that year, she was asked to conceal two Jewish children: Henri Amzel, age ten, and his sister, Denise, age six, at the schools.

A simplified version of the medal awarded to those who are named Righteous Among the Nations.

The Amzel family had immigrated to Paris from Eastern Europe but left that city when the war reached Paris, traveling to Marseilles where the parents rented an apartment with their two children. Their building's owner, understanding the danger facing the family in that city, suggested that instead of staying there, the children be housed in the Catholic boarding schools in Saint-Félicien, run by Banc. The parents moved from Marseilles to the schools' nearby village and Banc welcomed the children to the school and enrolled them as Catholics. With their close proximity, the parents and children could see one another on Sundays. Because the family was of only modest means, Banc covered the enrollment and boarding expenses for both students for both years at no cost to the family.

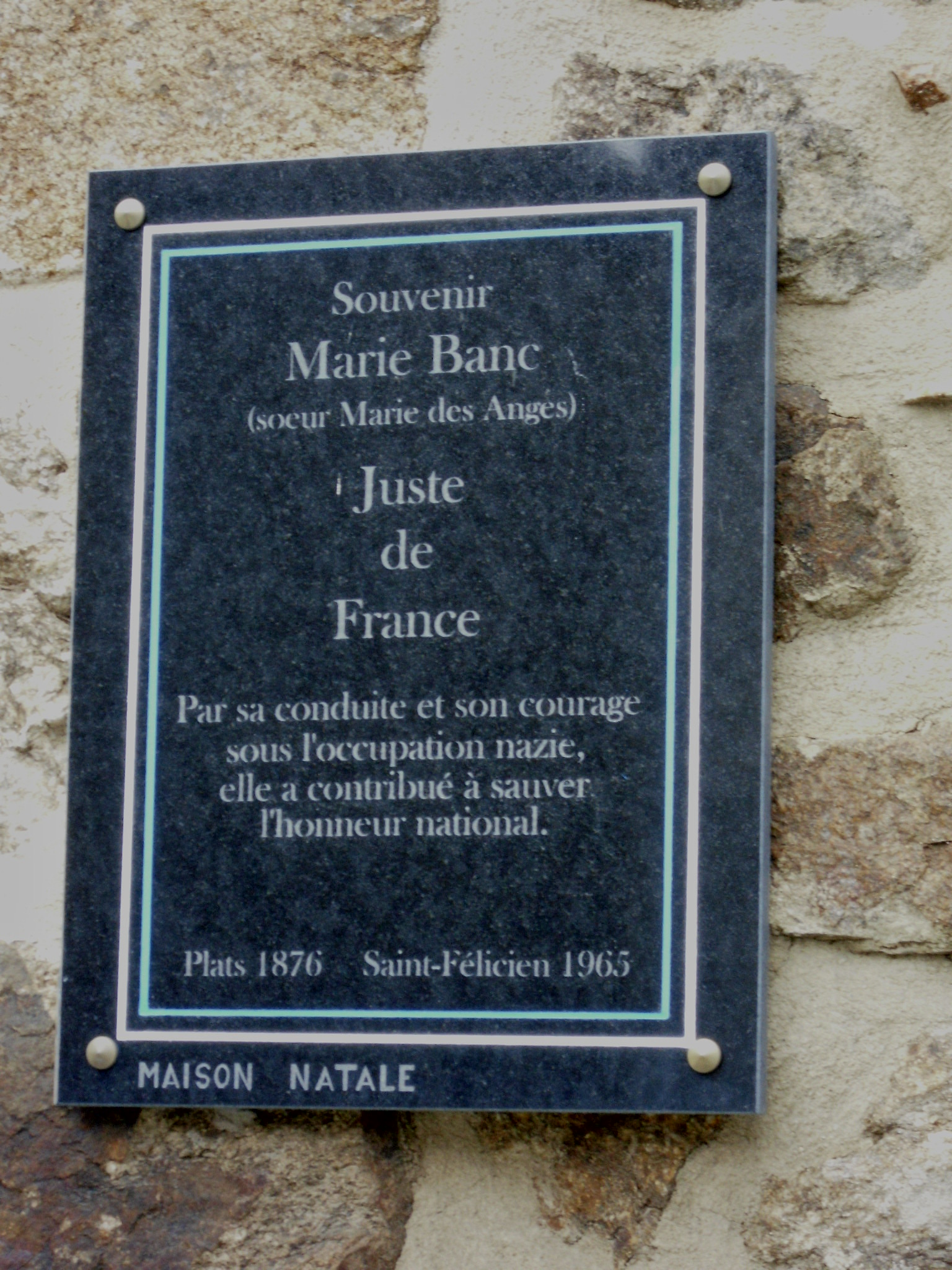
Commemorative plaque for Marie Banc (Sister Mary of the Angels).

Even though the German Gestapo searched the village regularly, and deported any Jews found there, the two children remained undetected because only Marie Banc and the directors of the two boarding schools knew that two Jewish children were living among the other Christian students. The scheme worked. Henri and Denise both survived undetected at the school and at war's end they were permanently reunited with their parents.

Marie Banc died at 88 years of age on 27 March 1965 in Saint-Félicien, France.

== Recognition ==
On March 4, 2001, Yad Vashem recognized Marie Banc as Righteous Among the Nations, which is recognition given to "non-Jews who took great risks to save Jews during the Holocaust."

A commemorative plaque was installed at the house where Banc was born and unveiled by the mayor of the village of Plats during an official ceremony held on Saturday, May 30, 2009.
