= Colombier-le-Jeune =

- Commune
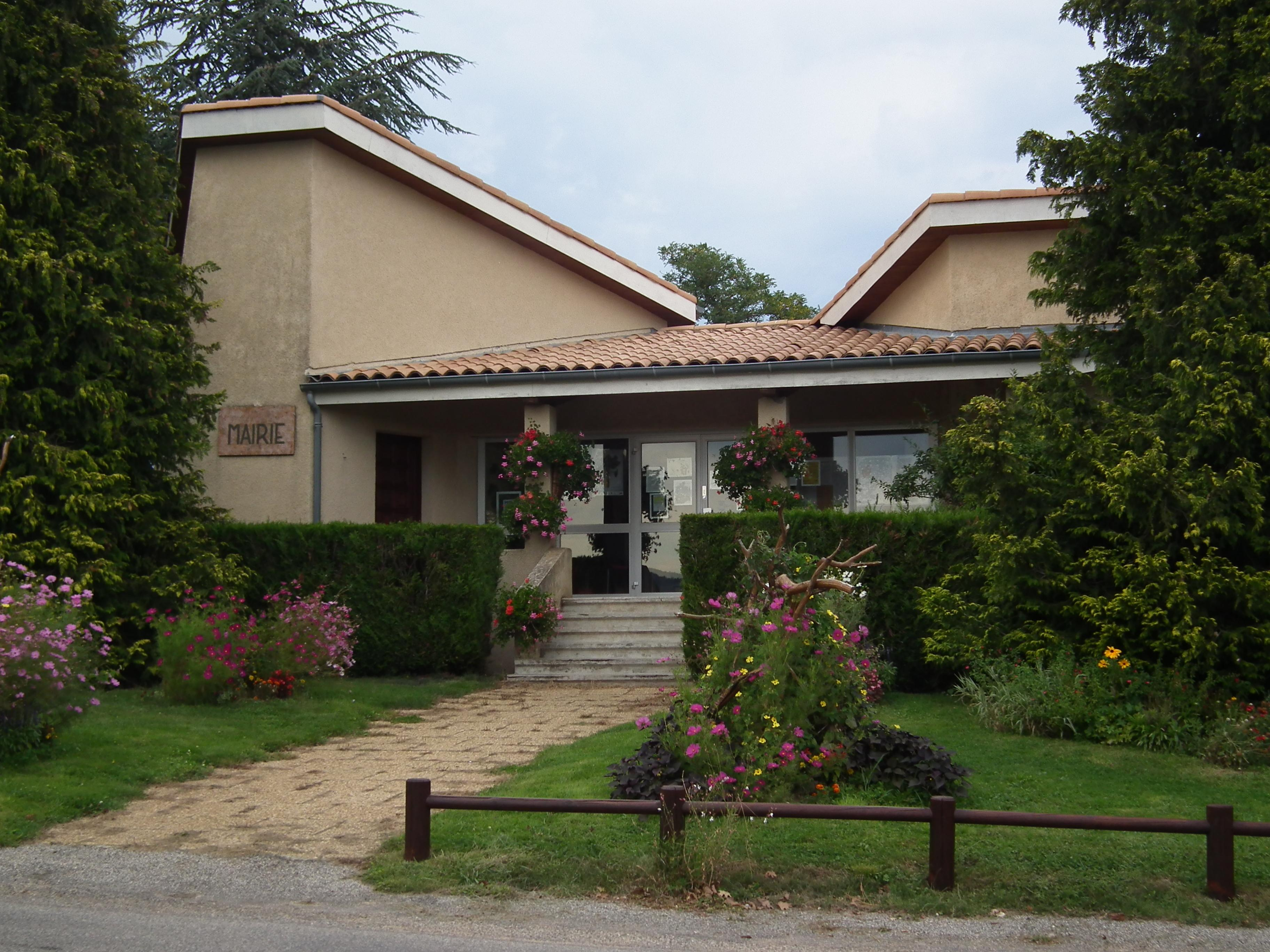
- Town hall
- Location of Colombier-le-Jeune
- Location within France Location within Auvergne-Rhône-Alpes
- Coordinates: 45°00′39″N 4°42′12″E
- Country: France
- Region: Auvergne-Rhône-Alpes
- Department: Ardèche
- Arrondissement: Tournon-sur-Rhône
- Canton: Tournon-sur-Rhône
- Intercommunality: CA Arche Agglo

Government
  - Mayor (2020–2026): Delphine Comte Deloche
- Area^{1}: 15.14 km^{2} (5.85 sq mi)
- Elevation: 450 m (1,480 ft)
- Highest elevation: 762 m (2,500 ft)
- Lowest elevation: 277 m (909 ft)
- Population (2023): 563
  - Density: 37.2/km^{2} (96.3/sq mi)
- Time zone: UTC+01:00 (CET)
  - Summer (DST): UTC+02:00 (CEST)
- INSEE/Postal code: 07068 /07270
- ^{1} French Land Register data, which excludes lakes, ponds, glaciers > 1 km^{2} (0.386 sq mi or 247 acres) and river estuaries.

Colombier-le-Jeune (French pronunciation: [kɔlɔ̃bje lə ʒœn]; Occitan: Colombier le Jeune) is a commune in the Ardèche department in southern France.

== Population ==
Historical population
Year	Pop.	±% p.a.
1968	541	—
1975	512	−0.78%
1982	503	−0.25%
1990	522	+0.46%
1999	505	−0.37%
2007	546	+0.98%
2012	568	+0.79%
2017	573	+0.18%
2023	563	−0.29%
Source: INSEE

== See also ==
- Communes of the Ardèche department
