= Canton of Tournon-sur-Rhône =

Coordinates: 45.06°N 4.83°E

- Canton
- Situation of the canton of Tournon-sur-Rhône in the department of Ardèche
- Country: France
- Region: Auvergne-Rhône-Alpes
- Department: Ardèche
- No. of communes: {{{nbcomm}}}
- Population (2023): 21,807
- INSEE code: 0714

The canton of Tournon-sur-Rhône is an administrative division of the Ardèche department, southern France. Its borders were modified at the French canton reorganisation which came into effect in March 2015. Its seat is in Tournon-sur-Rhône.

It consists of the following communes:

1. Boucieu-le-Roi
2. Cheminas
3. Colombier-le-Jeune
4. Étables
5. Glun
6. Lemps
7. Mauves
8. Plats
9. Saint-Barthélemy-le-Plain
10. Saint-Jean-de-Muzols
11. Sécheras
12. Tournon-sur-Rhône
13. Vion
