= Dunières =

- Commune
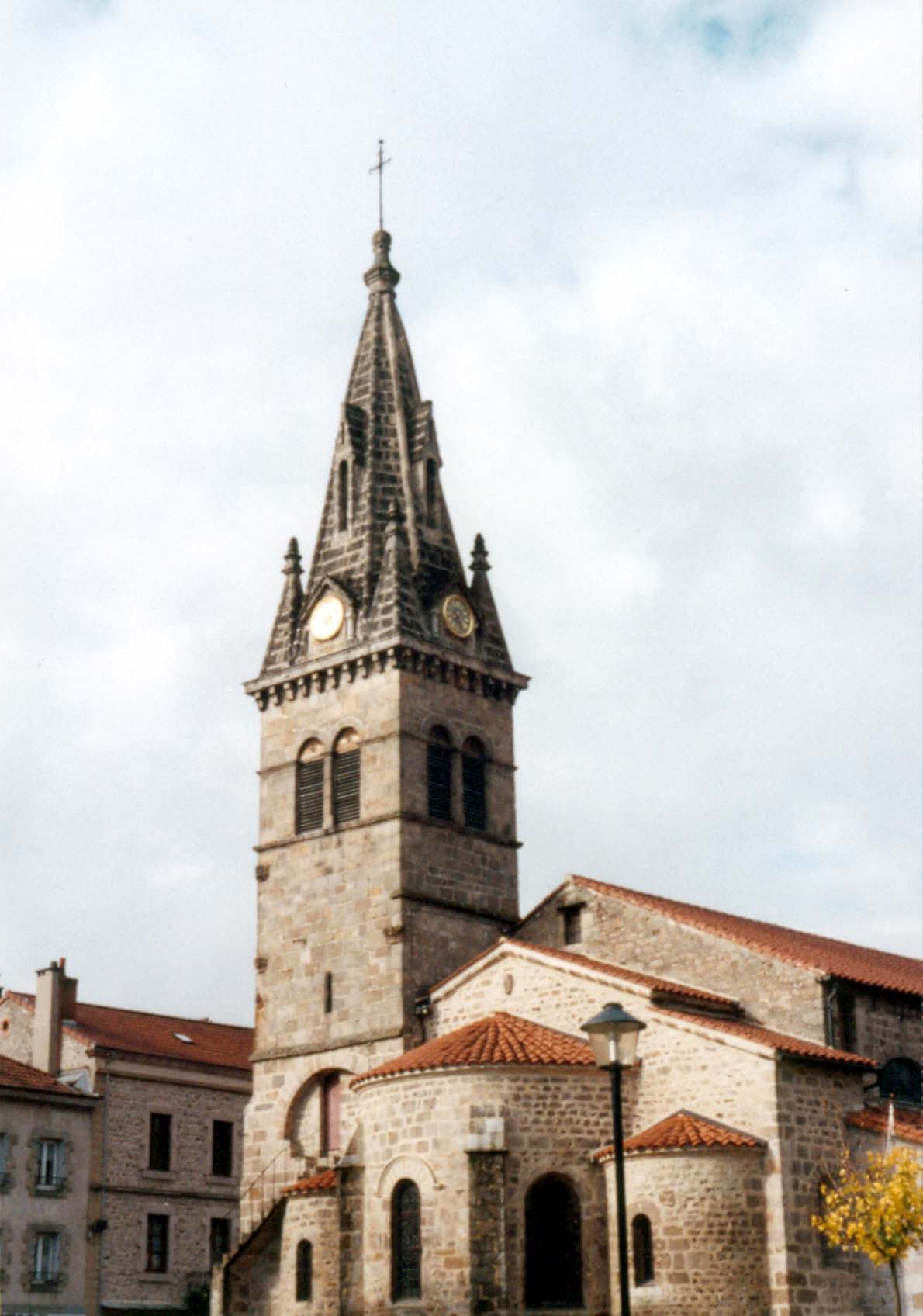

- Coat of arms
- Location of Dunières
- Location within France Location within Auvergne-Rhône-Alpes
- Coordinates: 45°12′59″N 4°20′44″E
- Country: France
- Region: Auvergne-Rhône-Alpes
- Department: Haute-Loire
- Arrondissement: Yssingeaux
- Canton: Boutières

Government
  - Mayor (2020–2026): Pierre Durieux
- Area^{1}: 34.75 km^{2} (13.42 sq mi)
- Elevation: 765 m (2,510 ft)
- Highest elevation: 1,033 m (3,389 ft)
- Lowest elevation: 711 m (2,333 ft)
- Population (2023): 2,670
  - Density: 76.8/km^{2} (199/sq mi)
- Time zone: UTC+01:00 (CET)
  - Summer (DST): UTC+02:00 (CEST)
- INSEE/Postal code: 43087 /43220
- ^{1} French Land Register data, which excludes lakes, ponds, glaciers > 1 km^{2} (0.386 sq mi or 247 acres) and river estuaries.

Dunières (French pronunciation: [dynjɛʁ]) is a commune in the Haute-Loire department in south-central France.

== Population ==
Historical population

Year	Pop.	±% p.a.
1793	2,010	—
1821	2,495	+0.77%
1846	2,339	−0.26%
1872	2,470	+0.21%
1901	3,219	+0.92%
1926	3,173	−0.06%
1946	3,077	−0.15%
1962	3,227	+0.30%
1968	3,146	−0.42%

Year	Pop.	±% p.a.
1975	2,996	−0.70%
1982	3,014	+0.09%
1990	3,009	−0.02%
1999	2,949	−0.22%
2007	2,996	+0.20%
2012	2,898	−0.66%
2017	2,787	−0.78%
2023	2,670	−0.71%

Source: EHESS and INSEE (1968–2023)

== See also ==
- Communes of the Haute-Loire department
