= Ozon, Ardèche =

Ozon
- Commune
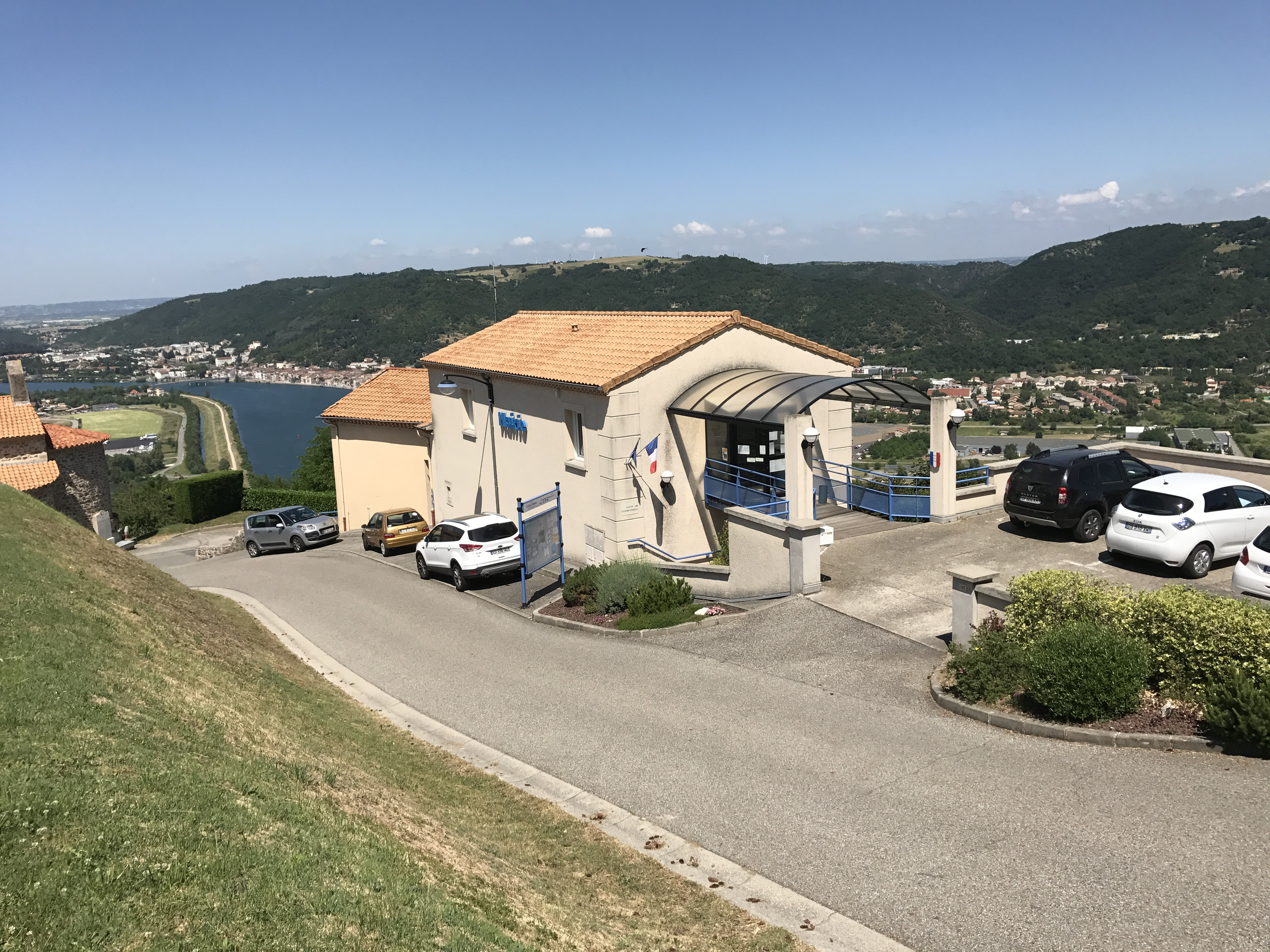
- Town hall
- Location of Ozon
- Location within France Location within Auvergne-Rhône-Alpes
- Coordinates: 45°10′00″N 4°48′13″E
- Country: France
- Region: Auvergne-Rhône-Alpes
- Department: Ardèche
- Arrondissement: Tournon-sur-Rhône
- Canton: Sarras

Government
  - Mayor (2020–2026): Maurice Sargier
- Area^{1}: 8.32 km^{2} (3.21 sq mi)
- Elevation: 271 m (889 ft)
- Highest elevation: 403 m (1,322 ft)
- Lowest elevation: 126 m (413 ft)
- Population (2023): 382
  - Density: 45.9/km^{2} (119/sq mi)
- Time zone: UTC+01:00 (CET)
  - Summer (DST): UTC+02:00 (CEST)
- INSEE/Postal code: 07169 /07370
- ^{1} French Land Register data, which excludes lakes, ponds, glaciers > 1 km^{2} (0.386 sq mi or 247 acres) and river estuaries.

Ozon (French pronunciation: [ozɔ̃]; Occitan: Auzon) is a commune in the Ardèche department in southern France.

== Population ==
Historical population
Year	Pop.	±% p.a.
1968	216	—
1975	204	−0.81%
1982	244	+2.59%
1990	275	+1.51%
1999	314	+1.48%
2007	341	+1.04%
2012	383	+2.35%
2017	398	+0.77%
2023	382	−0.68%
Source: INSEE

== See also ==
- Communes of the Ardèche department
