= Saint-Barthélemy-le-Plain =

- Commune
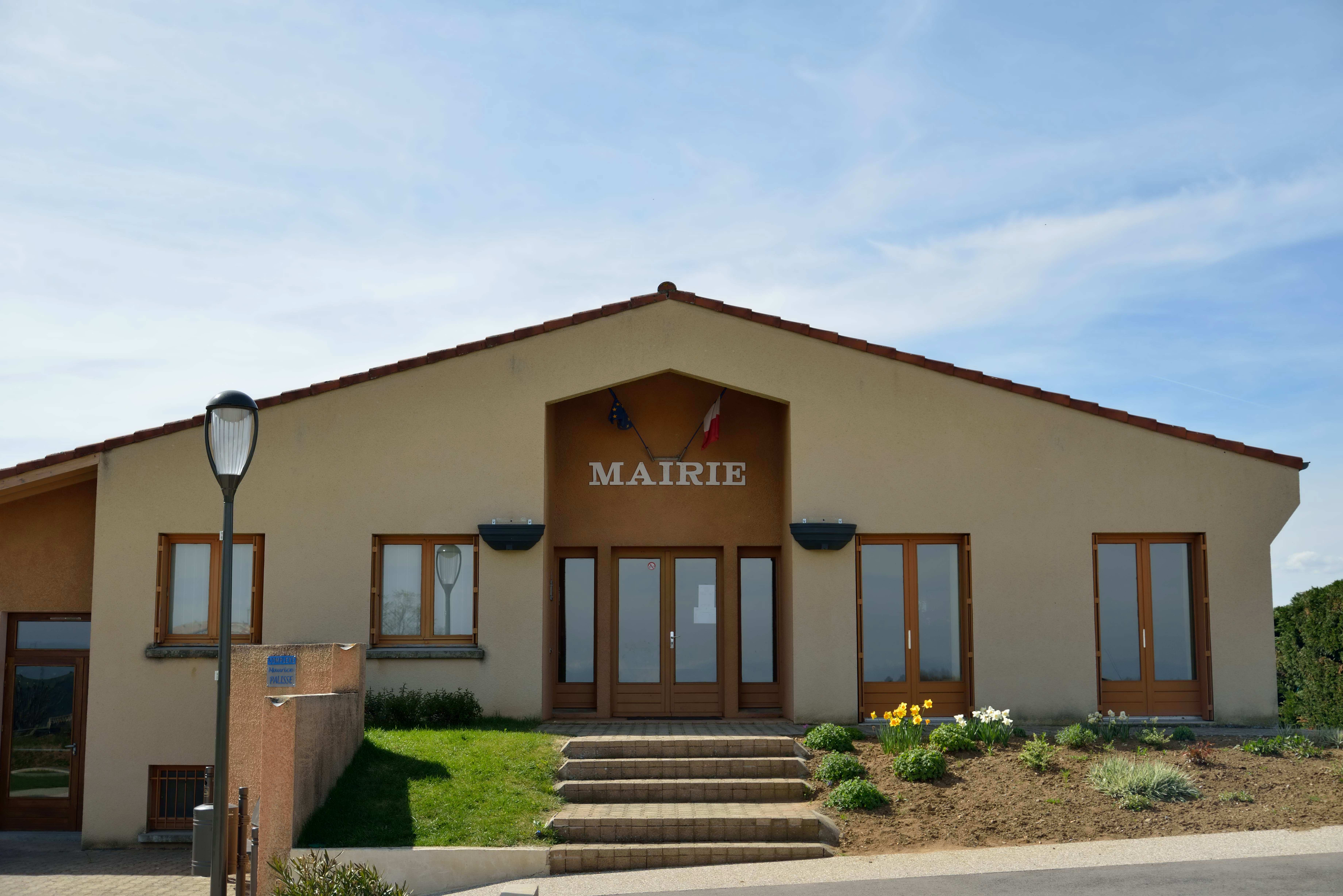
- The town hall in Saint-Barthélemy-le-Plain
- Location of Saint-Barthélemy-le-Plain
- Location within France Location within Auvergne-Rhône-Alpes
- Coordinates: 45°03′19″N 4°44′51″E
- Country: France
- Region: Auvergne-Rhône-Alpes
- Department: Ardèche
- Arrondissement: Tournon-sur-Rhône
- Canton: Tournon-sur-Rhône
- Intercommunality: CA Arche Agglo

Government
  - Mayor (2020–2026): Thierry Dard
- Area^{1}: 19.08 km^{2} (7.37 sq mi)
- Elevation: 420 m (1,380 ft)
- Highest elevation: 532 m (1,745 ft)
- Lowest elevation: 137 m (449 ft)
- Population (2023): 858
  - Density: 45.0/km^{2} (116/sq mi)
- Time zone: UTC+01:00 (CET)
  - Summer (DST): UTC+02:00 (CEST)
- INSEE/Postal code: 07217 /07300
- ^{1} French Land Register data, which excludes lakes, ponds, glaciers > 1 km^{2} (0.386 sq mi or 247 acres) and river estuaries.

Saint-Barthélemy-le-Plain (French pronunciation: [sɛ̃ baʁtelemi lə plɛ̃]; Occitan: Sant Bertomieu de Plan) is a commune in the Ardèche department in southern France.

== Population ==
Historical population
Year	Pop.	±% p.a.
1968	535	—
1975	517	−0.49%
1982	551	+0.91%
1990	587	+0.79%
1999	663	+1.36%
2007	752	+1.59%
2012	826	+1.89%
2017	825	−0.02%
2023	858	+0.66%
Source: INSEE

== See also ==
- Communes of the Ardèche department
