= Boucieu-le-Roi =

- Commune
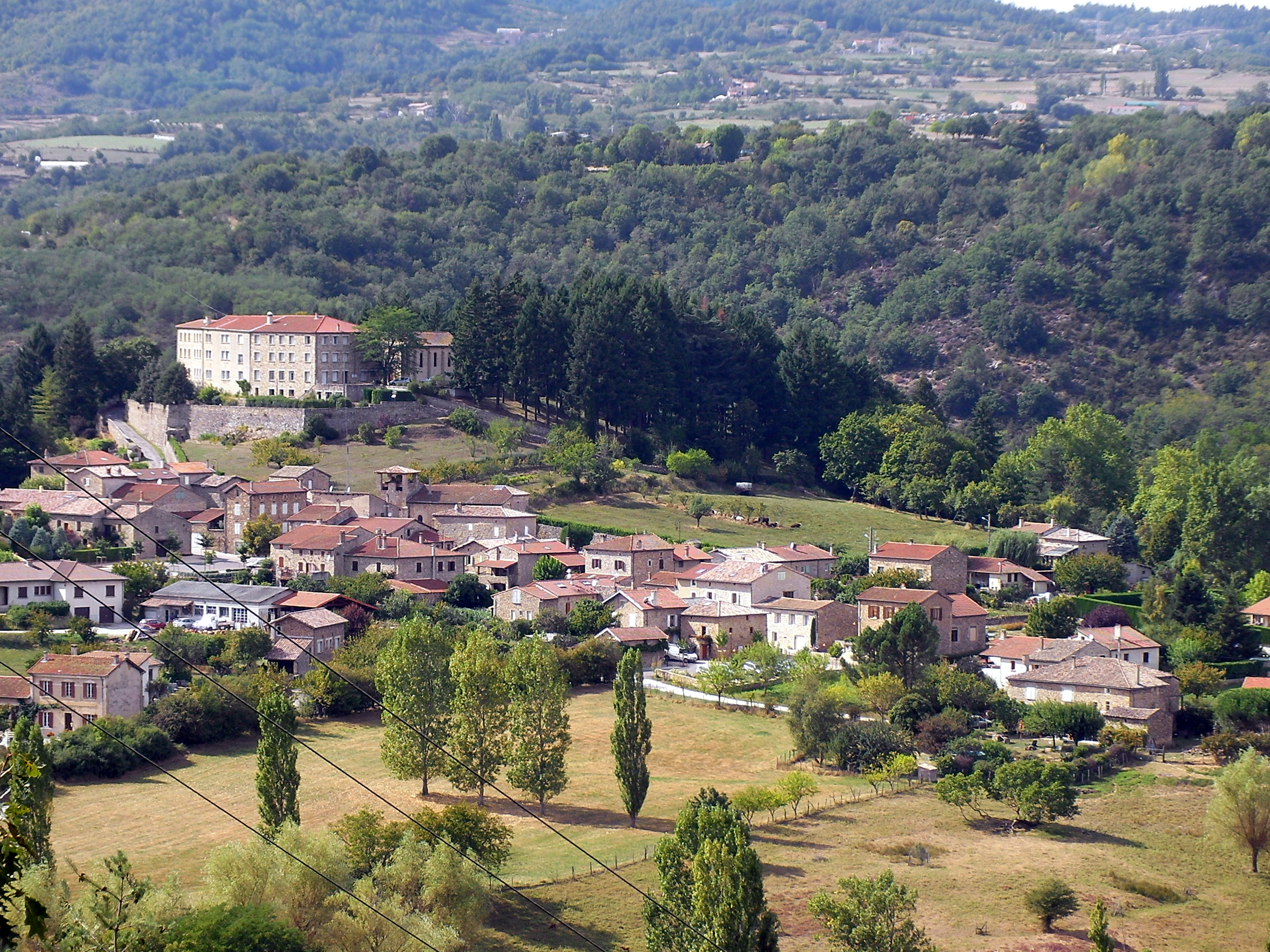
- A general view of Boucieu-le-Roi
- Location of Boucieu-le-Roi
- Location within France Location within Auvergne-Rhône-Alpes
- Coordinates: 45°02′12″N 4°40′58″E
- Country: France
- Region: Auvergne-Rhône-Alpes
- Department: Ardèche
- Arrondissement: Tournon-sur-Rhône
- Canton: Tournon-sur-Rhône
- Intercommunality: CA Arche Agglo

Government
  - Mayor (2020–2026): Patrick Fourchegu
- Area^{1}: 8.94 km^{2} (3.45 sq mi)
- Elevation: 276 m (906 ft)
- Highest elevation: 623 m (2,044 ft)
- Lowest elevation: 242 m (794 ft)
- Population (2023): 243
  - Density: 27.2/km^{2} (70.4/sq mi)
- Time zone: UTC+01:00 (CET)
  - Summer (DST): UTC+02:00 (CEST)
- INSEE/Postal code: 07040 /07270
- ^{1} French Land Register data, which excludes lakes, ponds, glaciers > 1 km^{2} (0.386 sq mi or 247 acres) and river estuaries.

Boucieu-le-Roi (French pronunciation: [busjø lə ʁwa]; Occitan: Bociu) is a commune in the Ardèche department in southern France.

== Population ==
Historical population
Year	Pop.	±% p.a.
1968	363	—
1975	287	−3.30%
1982	256	−1.62%
1990	277	+0.99%
1999	259	−0.74%
2007	275	+0.75%
2012	286	+0.79%
2017	269	−1.22%
2023	243	−1.68%
Source: INSEE

== See also ==
- Communes of the Ardèche department
