= Raucoules =

- Commune
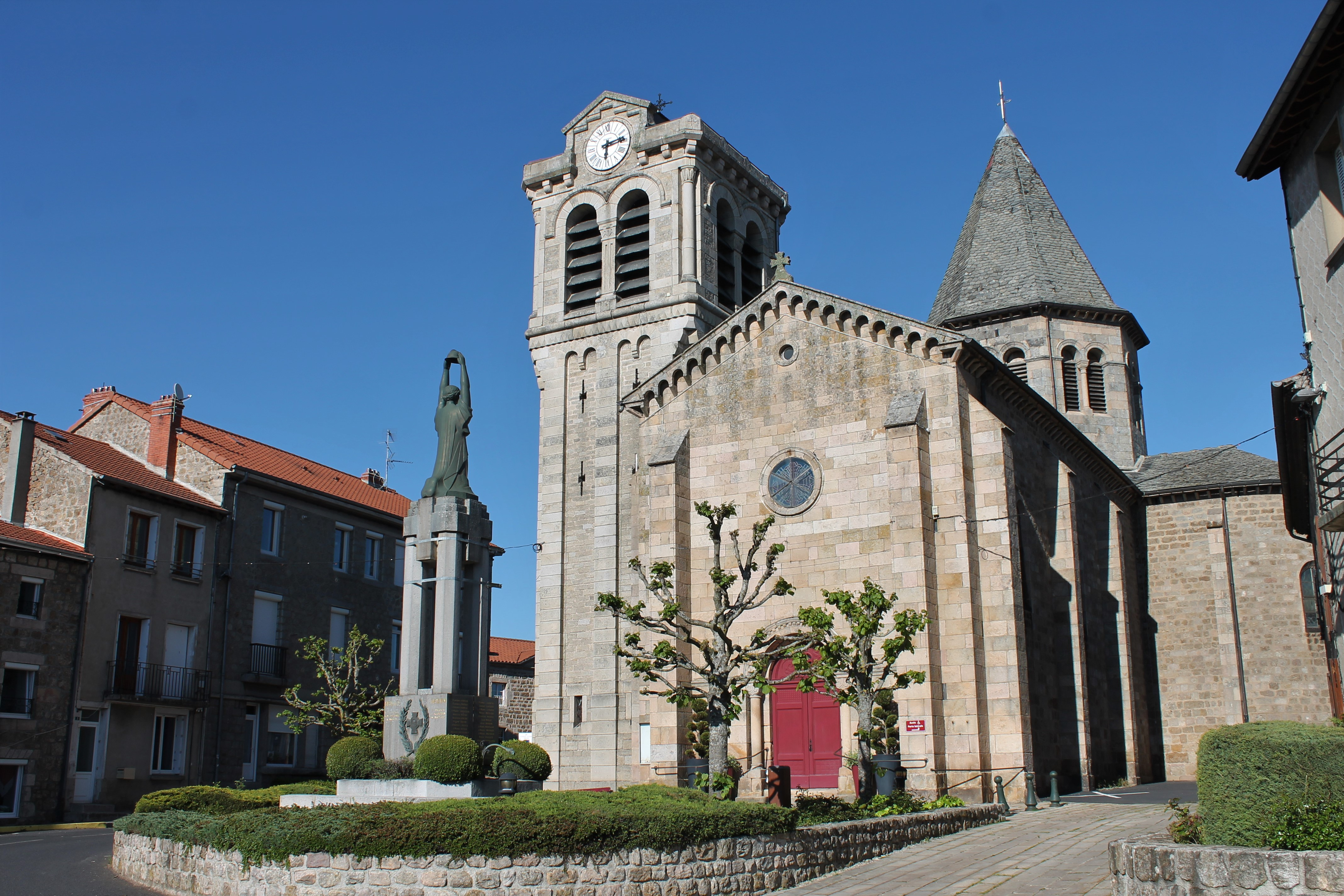
- Location of Raucoules
- Location within France Location within Auvergne-Rhône-Alpes
- Coordinates: 45°11′18″N 4°17′45″E
- Country: France
- Region: Auvergne-Rhône-Alpes
- Department: Haute-Loire
- Arrondissement: Yssingeaux
- Canton: Boutières

Government
  - Mayor (2020–2026): Bernard Souvignet
- Area^{1}: 21.01 km^{2} (8.11 sq mi)
- Elevation: 837 m (2,746 ft)
- Highest elevation: 915 m (3,002 ft)
- Lowest elevation: 630 m (2,070 ft)
- Population (2023): 948
  - Density: 45.1/km^{2} (117/sq mi)
- Time zone: UTC+01:00 (CET)
  - Summer (DST): UTC+02:00 (CEST)
- INSEE/Postal code: 43159 /43290
- ^{1} French Land Register data, which excludes lakes, ponds, glaciers > 1 km^{2} (0.386 sq mi or 247 acres) and river estuaries.

Raucoules (French pronunciation: [ʁɔkul]) is a commune in the Haute-Loire department in south-central France.

== Population ==
Historical population
Year	Pop.	±% p.a.
1968	675	—
1975	632	−0.94%
1982	588	−1.03%
1990	684	+1.91%
1999	751	+1.04%
2007	846	+1.50%
2012	897	+1.18%
2017	923	+0.57%
2023	948	+0.45%
Source: INSEE

== See also ==
- Communes of the Haute-Loire department
