= Sécheras =

- Commune
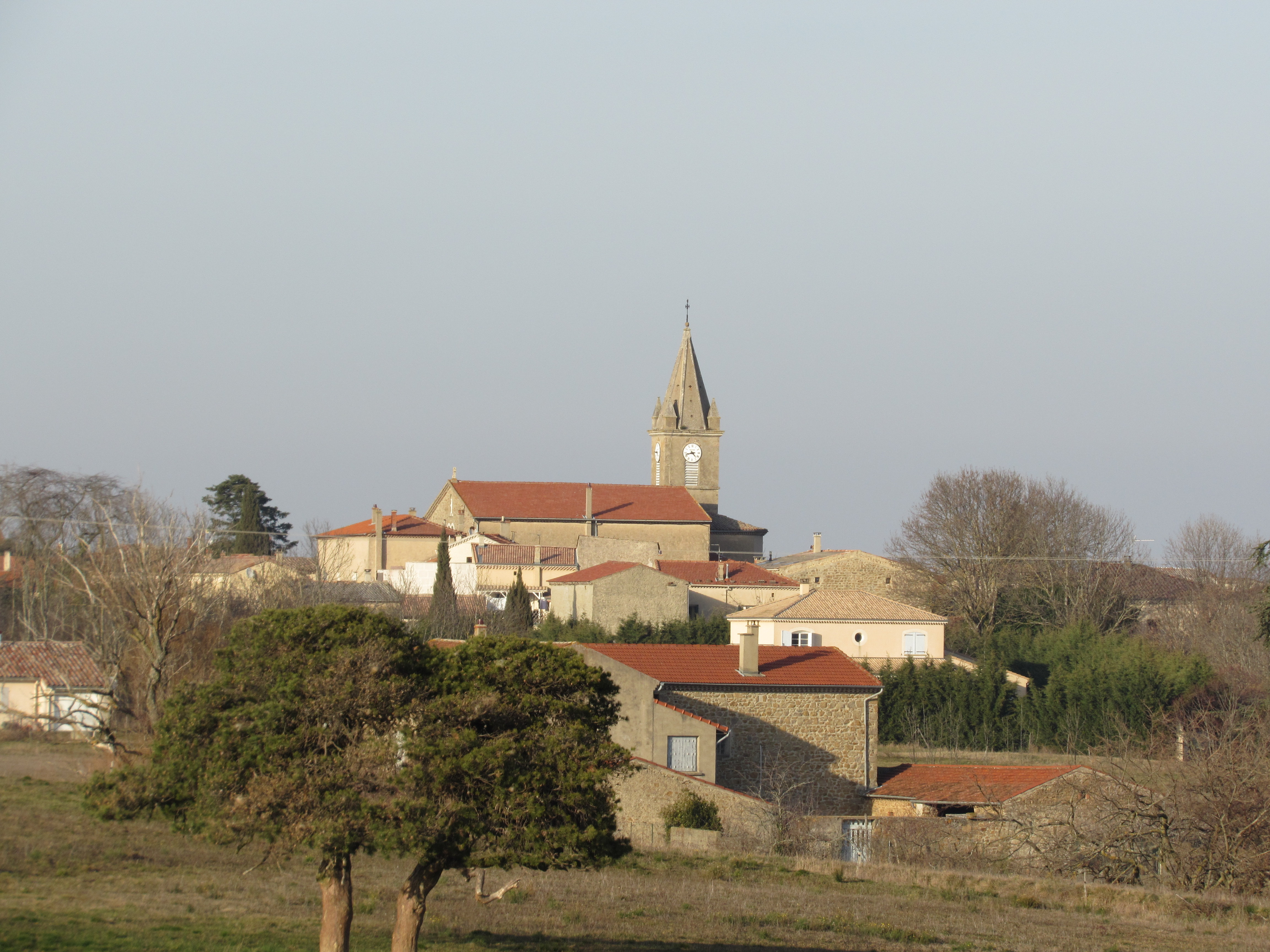
- Location of Sécheras
- Location within France Location within Auvergne-Rhône-Alpes
- Coordinates: 45°07′51″N 4°46′16″E
- Country: France
- Region: Auvergne-Rhône-Alpes
- Department: Ardèche
- Arrondissement: Tournon-sur-Rhône
- Canton: Tournon-sur-Rhône
- Intercommunality: CA Arche Agglo

Government
  - Mayor (2020–2026): Pascal Balay
- Area^{1}: 7.26 km^{2} (2.80 sq mi)
- Elevation: 432 m (1,417 ft)
- Highest elevation: 449 m (1,473 ft)
- Lowest elevation: 170 m (560 ft)
- Population (2023): 516
  - Density: 71.1/km^{2} (184/sq mi)
- Time zone: UTC+01:00 (CET)
  - Summer (DST): UTC+02:00 (CEST)
- INSEE/Postal code: 07312 /07610
- ^{1} French Land Register data, which excludes lakes, ponds, glaciers > 1 km^{2} (0.386 sq mi or 247 acres) and river estuaries.

Sécheras (Occitan: Sec) is a commune in the Ardèche department in the Auvergne-Rhône-Alpes region in southern France. It is around 60 km south of Lyon.

== Population ==
Historical population
Year	Pop.	±% p.a.
1968	253	—
1975	233	−1.17%
1982	233	+0.00%
1990	297	+3.08%
1999	308	+0.40%
2007	477	+5.62%
2012	502	+1.03%
2017	554	+1.99%
2023	516	−1.18%
Source: INSEE

== See also ==
- Communes of the Ardèche department
