= Vion, Ardèche =

Vion
- Commune
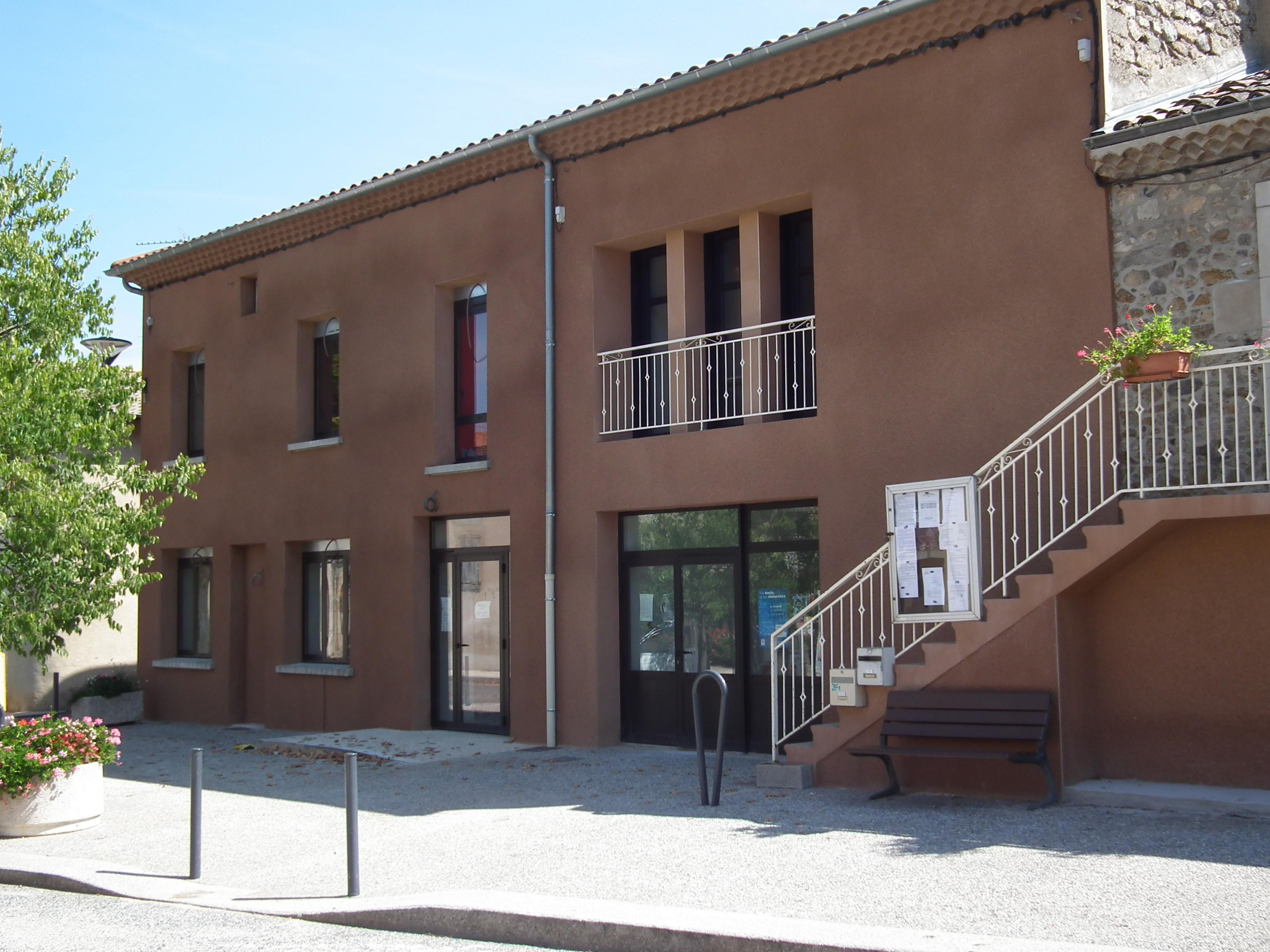
- The town hall in Vion
- Location of Vion
- Location within France Location within Auvergne-Rhône-Alpes
- Coordinates: 45°06′40″N 4°48′27″E
- Country: France
- Region: Auvergne-Rhône-Alpes
- Department: Ardèche
- Arrondissement: Tournon-sur-Rhône
- Canton: Tournon-sur-Rhône
- Intercommunality: CA Arche Agglo

Government
  - Mayor (2020–2026): David Bonnet
- Area^{1}: 6.21 km^{2} (2.40 sq mi)
- Elevation: 129 m (423 ft)
- Highest elevation: 446 m (1,463 ft)
- Lowest elevation: 115 m (377 ft)
- Population (2023): 923
  - Density: 149/km^{2} (385/sq mi)
- Time zone: UTC+01:00 (CET)
  - Summer (DST): UTC+02:00 (CEST)
- INSEE/Postal code: 07345 /07610
- ^{1} French Land Register data, which excludes lakes, ponds, glaciers > 1 km^{2} (0.386 sq mi or 247 acres) and river estuaries.

Vion (French pronunciation: [vjɔ̃]) is a commune in the Ardèche department in southern France. It is known for its ancient church that is dated from the 1400s. There are many local winemakers in this small town.

== Population ==
Historical population
Year	Pop.	±% p.a.
1968	506	—
1975	541	+0.96%
1982	596	+1.39%
1990	701	+2.05%
1999	753	+0.80%
2007	866	+1.76%
2012	946	+1.78%
2017	939	−0.15%
2023	923	−0.29%
Source: INSEE

== See also ==
- Communes of the Ardèche department
