= Lemps, Ardèche =

Lemps
- Commune
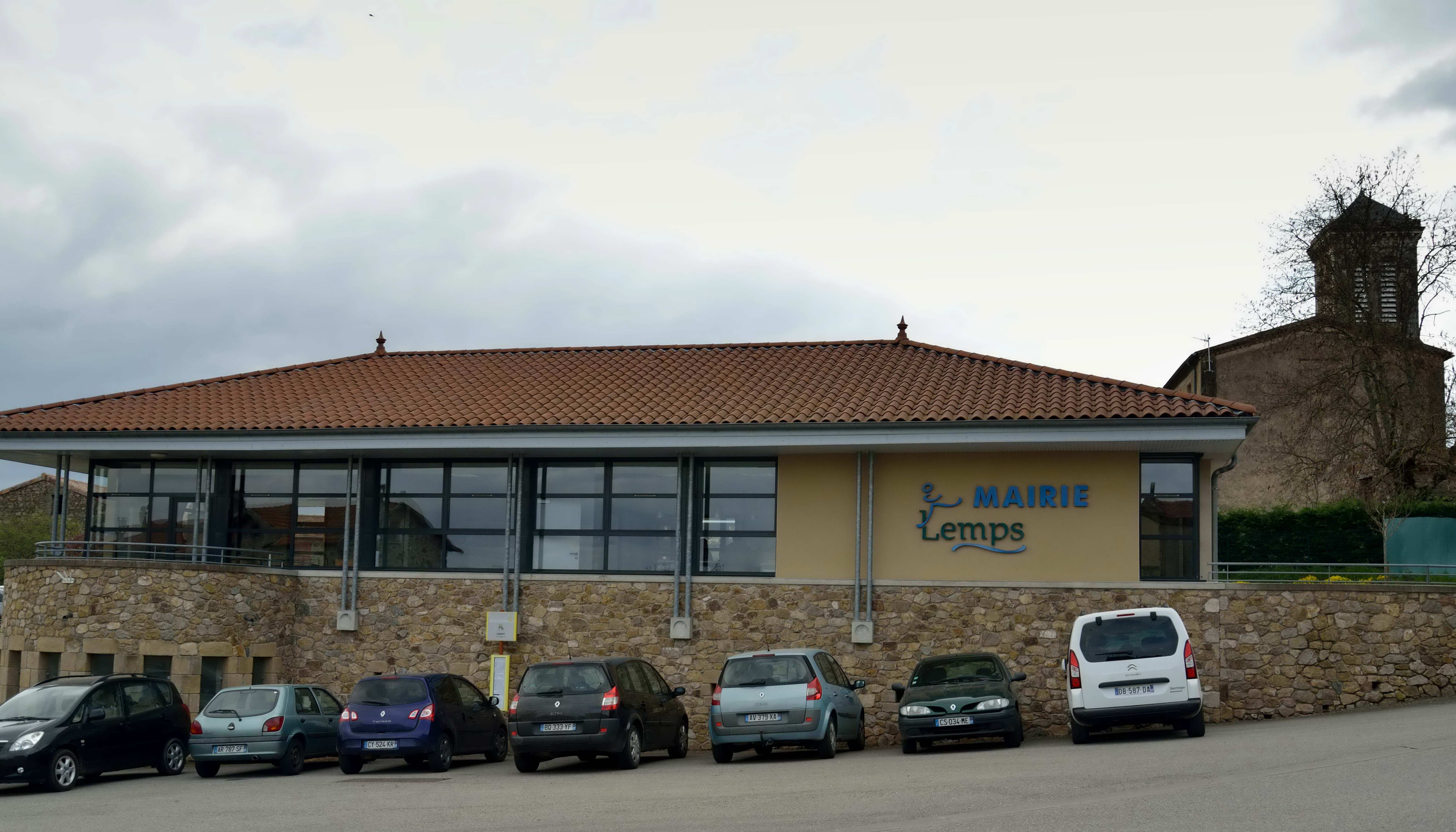
- The town hall in Lemps
- Location of Lemps
- Location within France Location within Auvergne-Rhône-Alpes
- Coordinates: 45°06′36″N 4°45′55″E
- Country: France
- Region: Auvergne-Rhône-Alpes
- Department: Ardèche
- Arrondissement: Tournon-sur-Rhône
- Canton: Tournon-sur-Rhône
- Intercommunality: CA Arche Agglo

Government
  - Mayor (2020–2026): Patrick Cettier
- Area^{1}: 12.18 km^{2} (4.70 sq mi)
- Elevation: 400 m (1,300 ft)
- Highest elevation: 478 m (1,568 ft)
- Lowest elevation: 117 m (384 ft)
- Population (2023): 798
  - Density: 65.5/km^{2} (170/sq mi)
- Time zone: UTC+01:00 (CET)
  - Summer (DST): UTC+02:00 (CEST)
- INSEE/Postal code: 07140 /07610
- ^{1} French Land Register data, which excludes lakes, ponds, glaciers > 1 km^{2} (0.386 sq mi or 247 acres) and river estuaries.

Lemps (French pronunciation: [lɛ̃s]) is a commune in the Ardèche department in southern France.

== Population ==
Historical population
Year	Pop.	±% p.a.
1968	326	—
1975	348	+0.94%
1982	431	+3.10%
1990	507	+2.05%
1999	572	+1.35%
2007	740	+3.27%
2012	779	+1.03%
2017	785	+0.15%
2023	798	+0.27%
Source: INSEE

== See also ==
- Communes of the Ardèche department
