= Saint-Félicien, Ardèche =

Saint-Félicien
- Commune
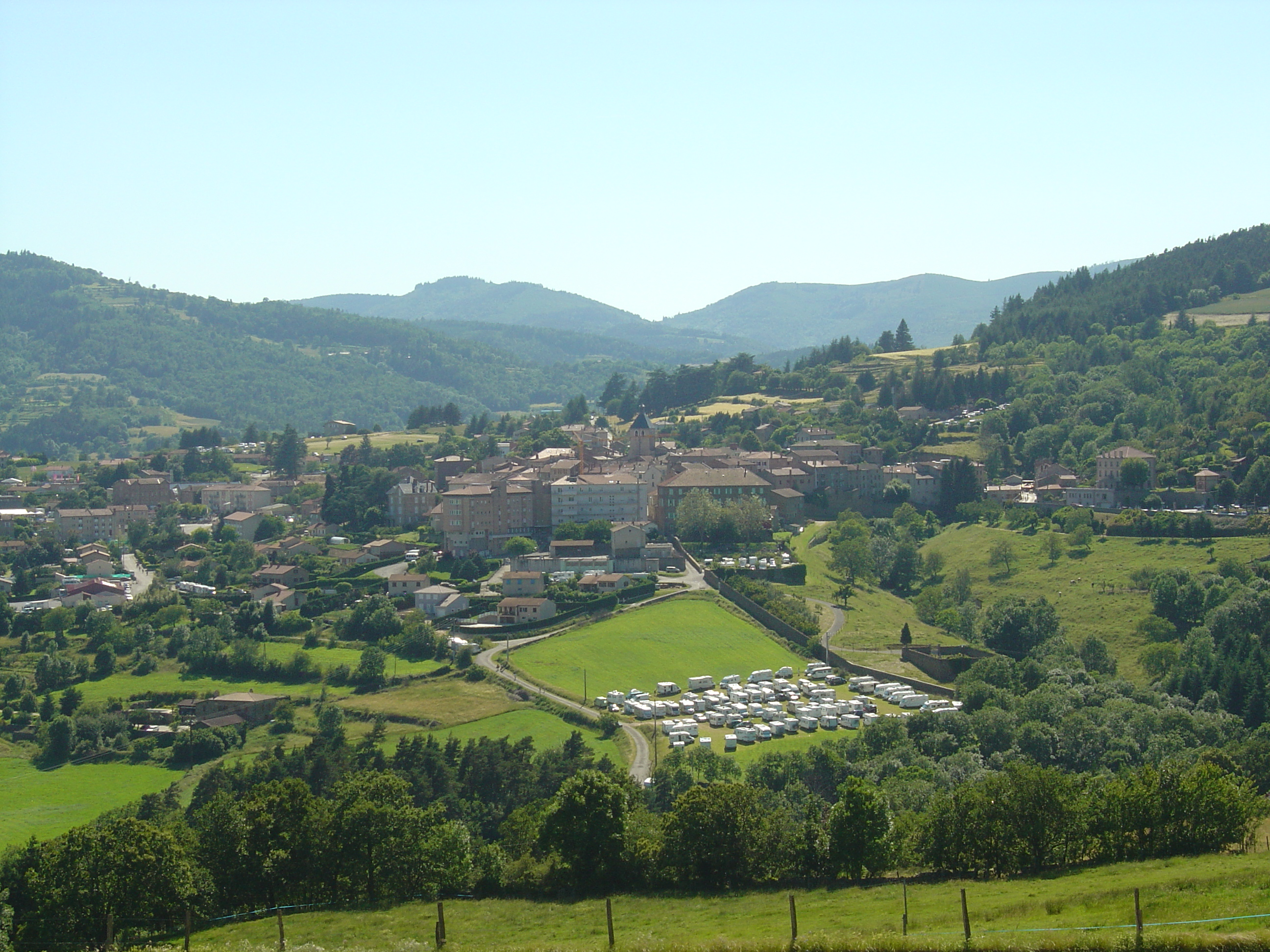
- A view of Saint-Félicien from the route to the Col de Fontaille

- Coat of arms
- Location of Saint-Félicien
- Location within France Location within Auvergne-Rhône-Alpes
- Coordinates: 45°05′12″N 4°37′41″E
- Country: France
- Region: Auvergne-Rhône-Alpes
- Department: Ardèche
- Arrondissement: Tournon-sur-Rhône
- Canton: Haut-Vivarais
- Intercommunality: CA Arche Agglo

Government
  - Mayor (2020–2026): Yann Eyssautier
- Area^{1}: 21.44 km^{2} (8.28 sq mi)
- Elevation: 542 m (1,778 ft)
- Highest elevation: 1,028 m (3,373 ft)
- Lowest elevation: 414 m (1,358 ft)
- Population (2023): 1,119
  - Density: 52.19/km^{2} (135.2/sq mi)
- Time zone: UTC+01:00 (CET)
  - Summer (DST): UTC+02:00 (CEST)
- INSEE/Postal code: 07236 /07410
- ^{1} French Land Register data, which excludes lakes, ponds, glaciers > 1 km^{2} (0.386 sq mi or 247 acres) and river estuaries.

Saint-Félicien (French pronunciation: [sɛ̃ felisjɛ̃]; Vivaro-Alpine: Sant Farcian) is a commune in the Ardèche department in southern France.

== Population ==
Historical population
| Year | Pop. | ±% p.a. |
|---|---|---|
| 1968 | 1,214 | — |
| 1975 | 1,144 | −0.84% |
| 1982 | 1,238 | +1.13% |
| 1990 | 1,240 | +0.02% |
| 1999 | 1,183 | −0.52% |
| 2007 | 1,226 | +0.45% |
| 2012 | 1,161 | −1.08% |
| 2017 | 1,191 | +0.51% |
| 2023 | 1,119 | −1.03% |
Source: INSEE

== Personalities linked to Saint-Félicien ==
- Marie-France Banc (1876 - 1965), Righteous Among the Nations. Under the name Sister Mary of the Angels, Mother Superior Banc ran the two boarding houses in Saint-Félicien during World War II and protected two Jewish children for two years. She died in Saint-Félicien in 1965.

== See also ==
- Communes of the Ardèche department
