= Depictions of Kiddush levana =

Images of Jewish blessing of the moon

Kiddush levana is a Jewish ritual and prayer service, generally observed on the first or second Saturday night of each Hebrew month. Artists have depicted Kiddush levana for centuries, in paintings, woodcuts, engravings, and manuscript illuminations. Some depictions of moon divination on Hoshana Rabbah have been misattributed to Kiddush levana by reference works.

== Manuscript illuminations (1300–1600) ==
One 13th-century Italian prayerbook decorates Kiddush levana with a moon accompanied by a series of ladders in a field of stars. Portrayals of Kiddush levana are particularly common in 15th-century Italian liturgical manuscripts, which often show a silver crescent moon. The moon is generally anthropomorphized, a practice which had been adopted from Christian art in the 13th century.

=== Gallery ===
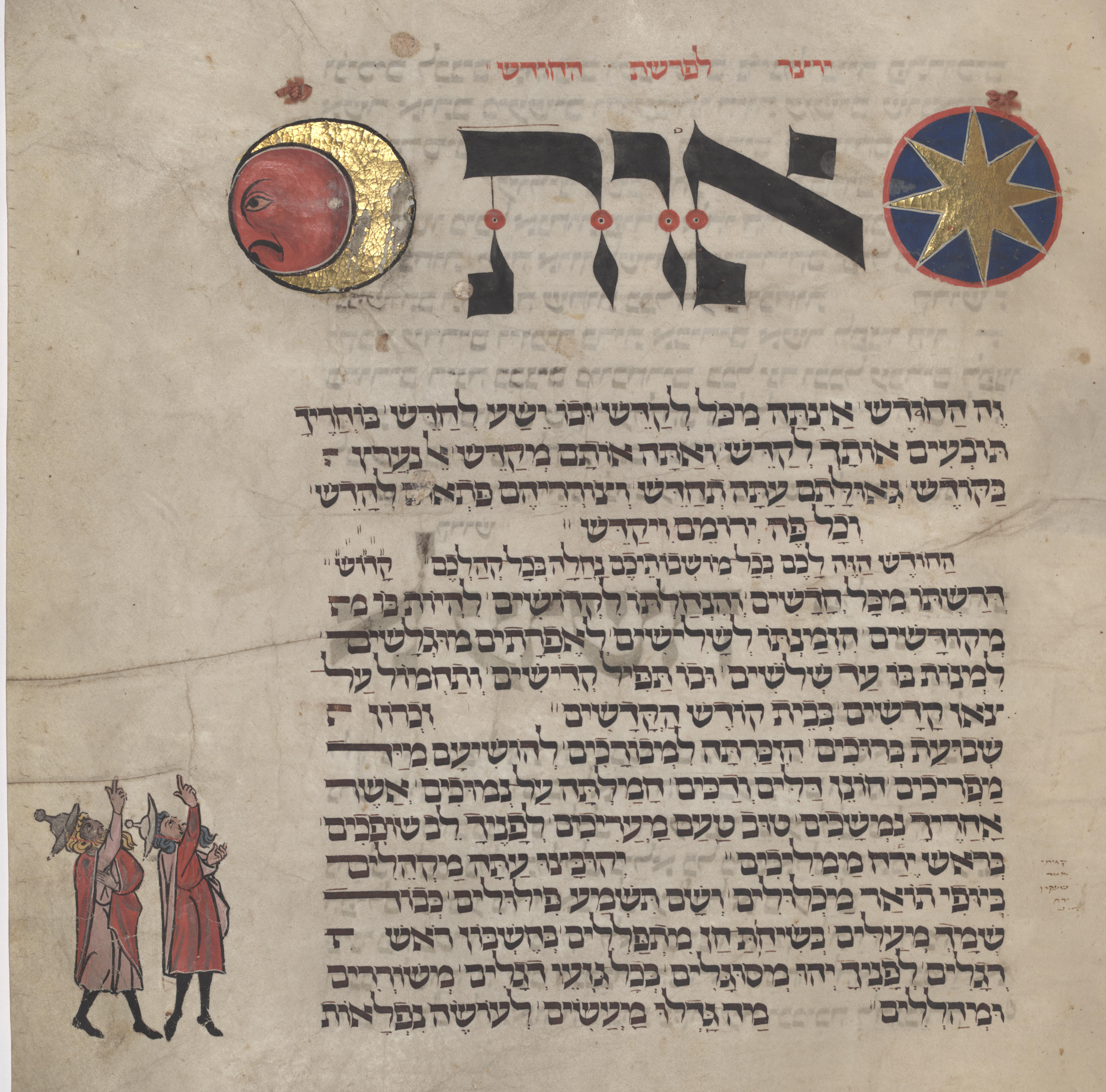
c. 1310, in Machzor Leipzig (Note: Imitated by MS Mich. 434 f. 42r (1604). Regarding the large sun and moon to either side of the incipit, cf. Worms Mahzor f. 26v (c. 1272–1280), Tripartite Mahzor f. 85v, Darmstadt MS Or. 13 f. 60r, Bodleian MSS Laud. Or. 321 f. 57v, Opp. 161 f. 40v, and Mich. 617 f. 26r, and MS Kaufmann A 388 vol. I f. 90r (c. 1270–1290). Retrieved 9 March 2025 – via Dávid Kaufmann. See Shalev-Eyni, Sarit (2004). "Cosmological Signs in Calculating the Time of Redemption: The Christian Crucifixion and the Jewish New Moon of Nissan". Viator. 35 (1): 265-287, "The similar size of both luminaries, their position in the two upper corners of the panel, as well as the human features of the moon are based on the Christian model . . . From the surviving Ashkenazi prayer books we can deduce that the iconography of the luminaries as an illustration to the piyyut 'Sign of this Month' was formed towards the middle of the thirteenth century, close to the time when eschatological calculations were flourishing in Jewish and Christian sources . . .")

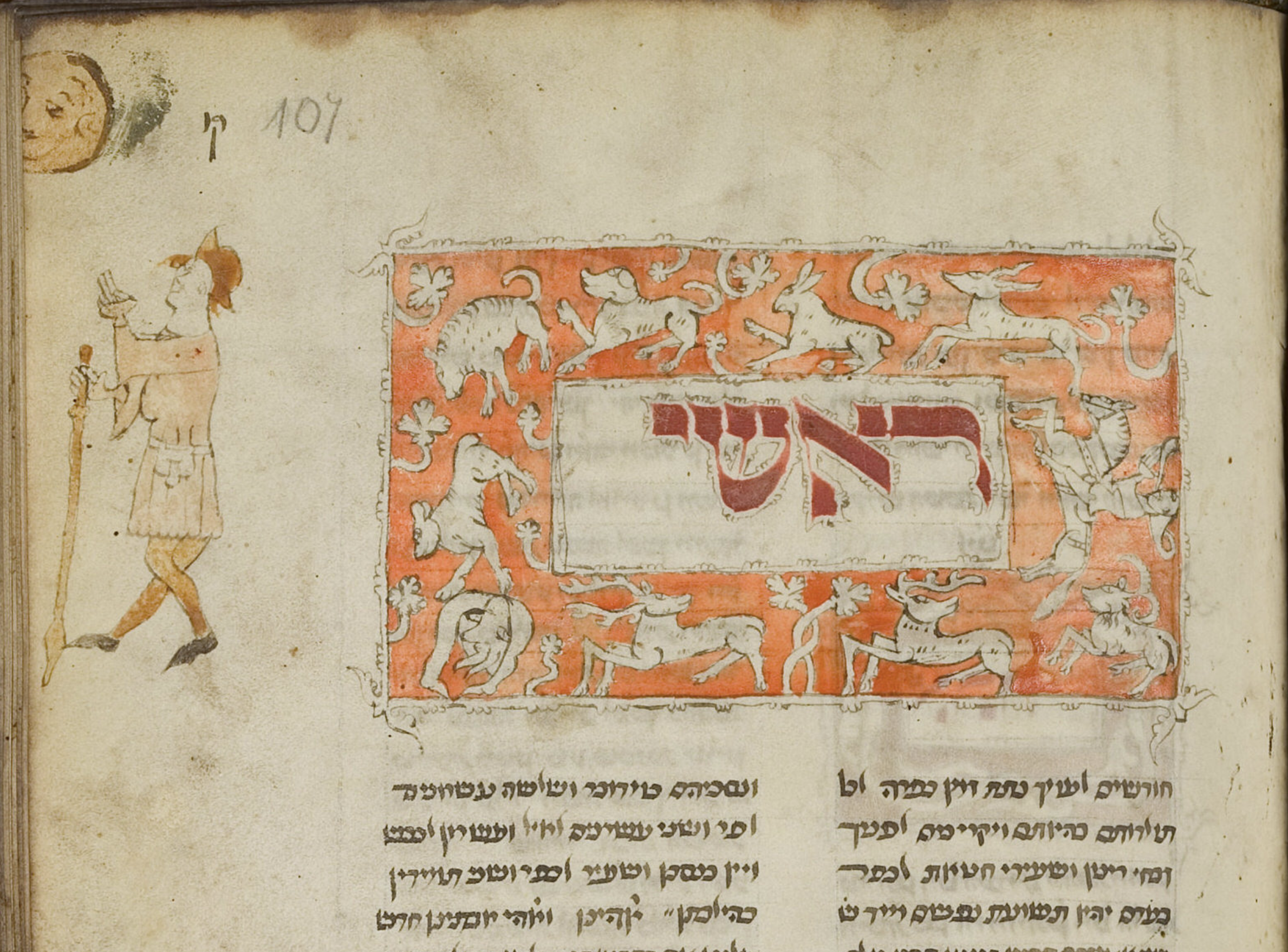
1393, by Abraham ben Samuel of Wenigerode

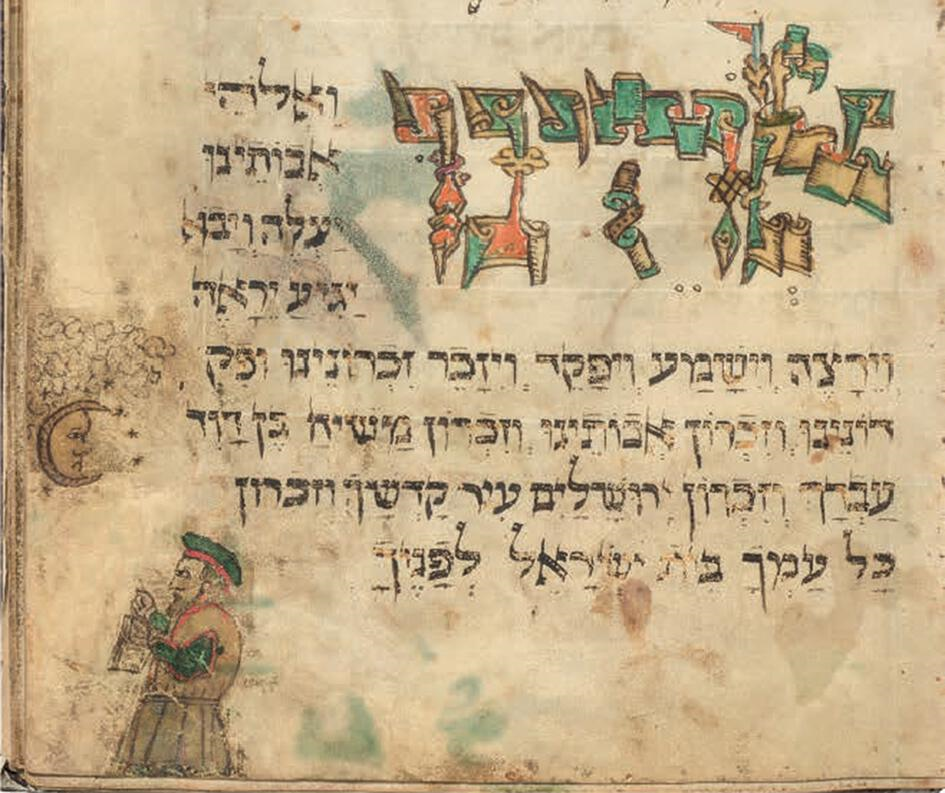
1589, in the Nuremberg Miscellany
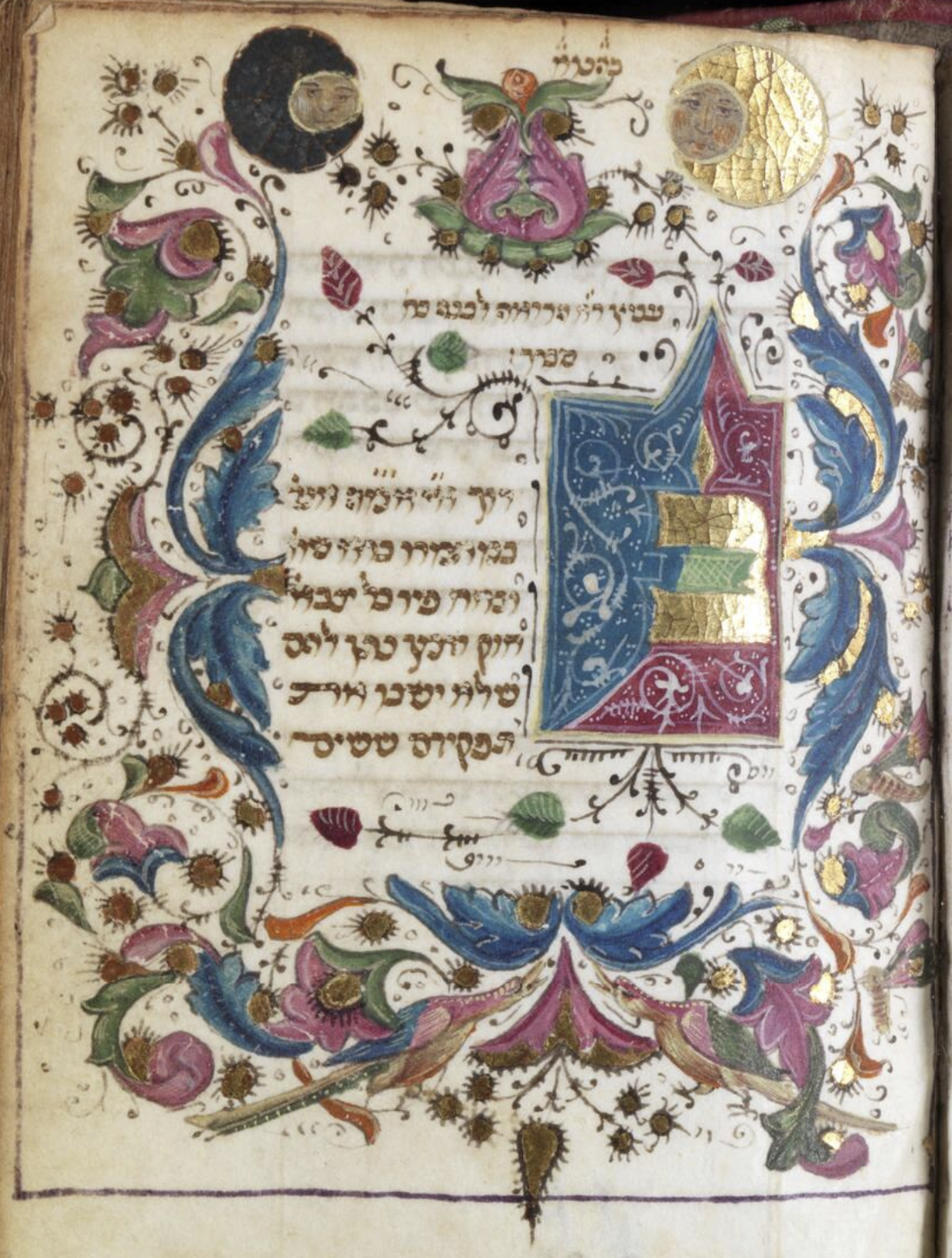
15th century (Italy), by "Isaac"

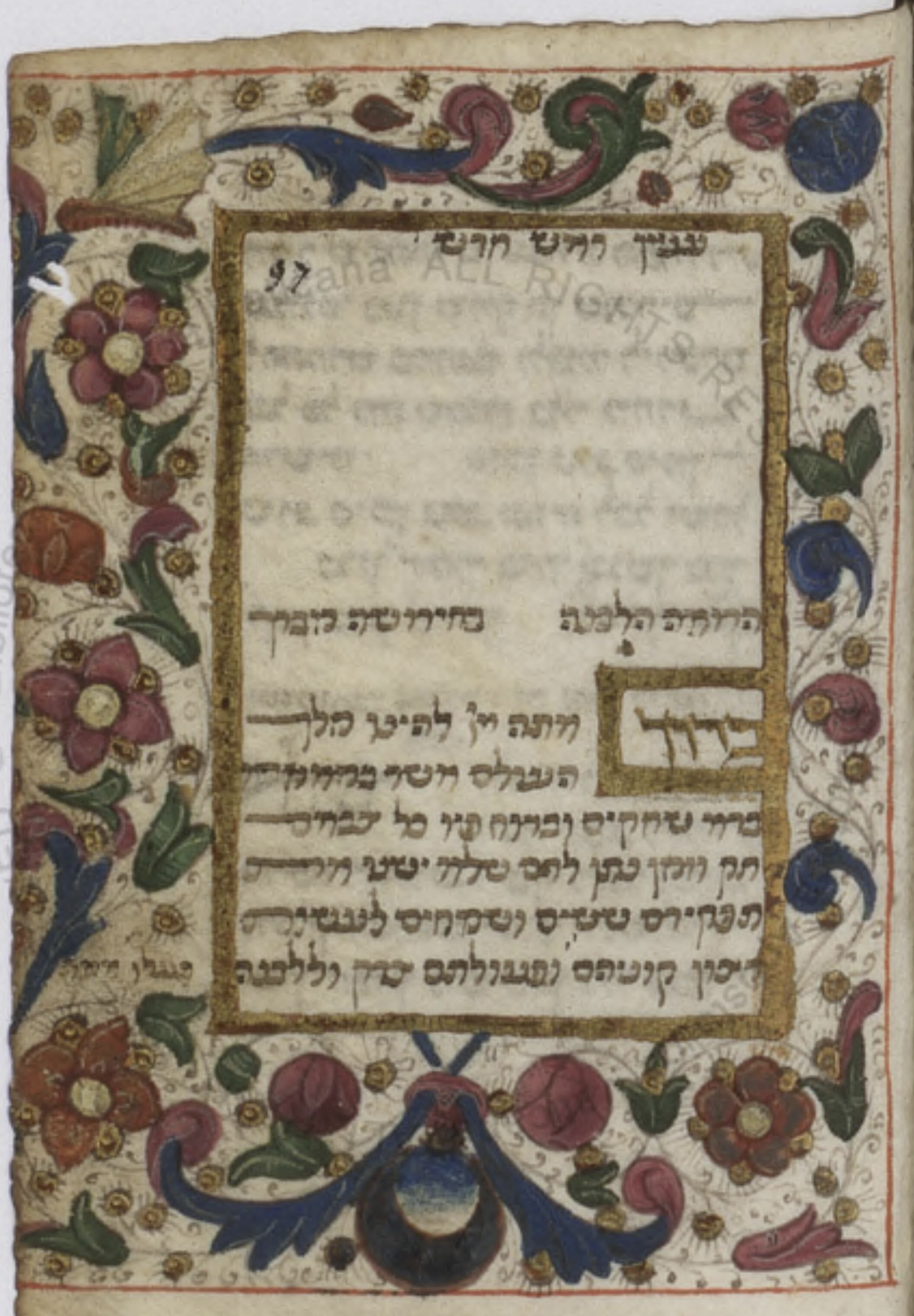
15th century (Italy)

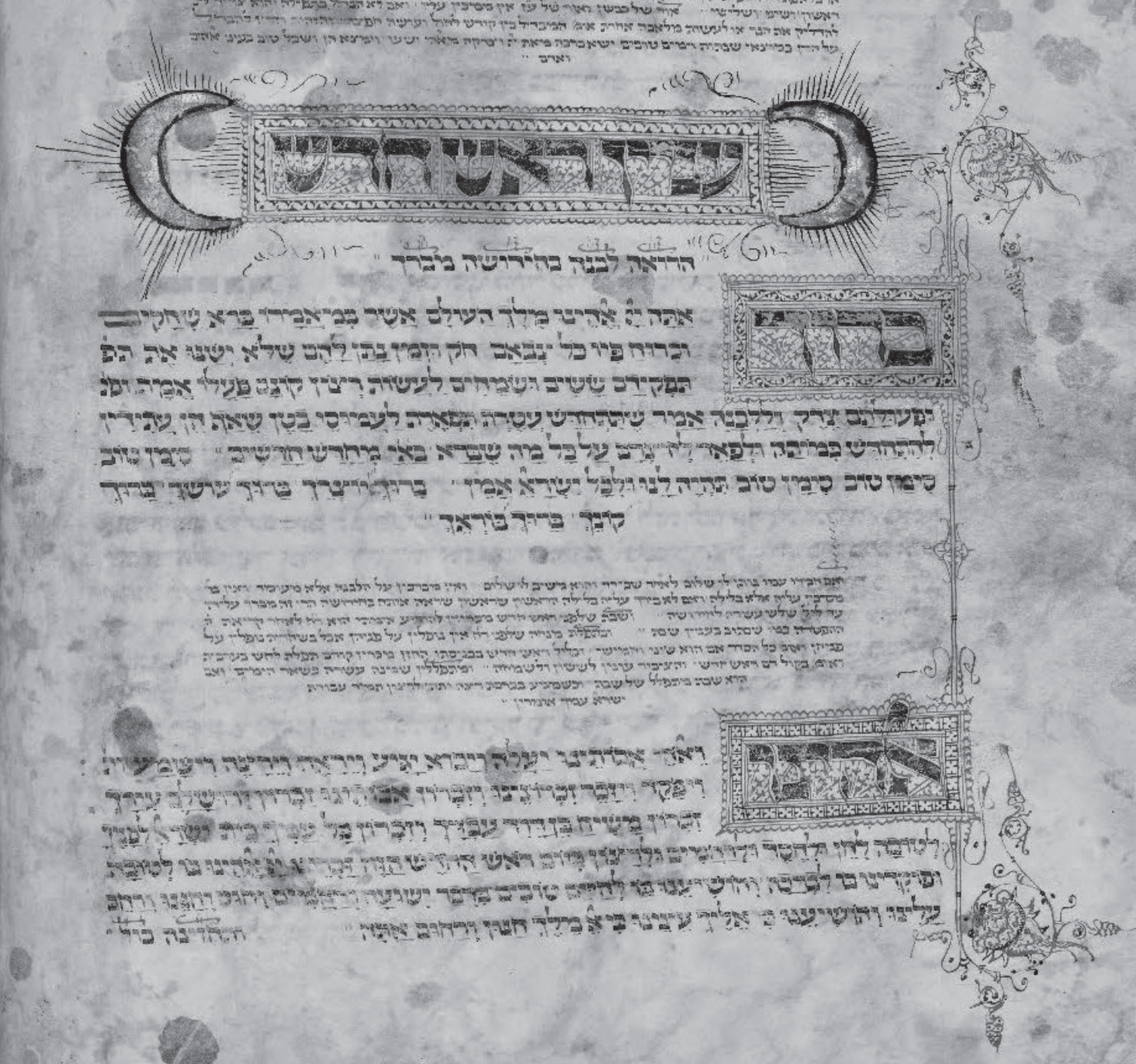
1441, in the Schottenstein Mahzor, text by Moses ben Avraham (Note: Said to be “written on a red and blue panel decorated by the scribe . . . flanked on either side by a crescent moon embellished with silver leaf. The decision to depict both a waxing and a waning moon is atypical because the benediction is recited specifically upon seeing the New Moon”. Cohen, Evelyn M. (2024). "The Art of the Schottenstein Italian Mahzor of 1441: A Preliminary Study". Beloved David. pp. 503–504. See however other examples of reversed moon in this gallery, including MS Parma 1756 f. [93r].)

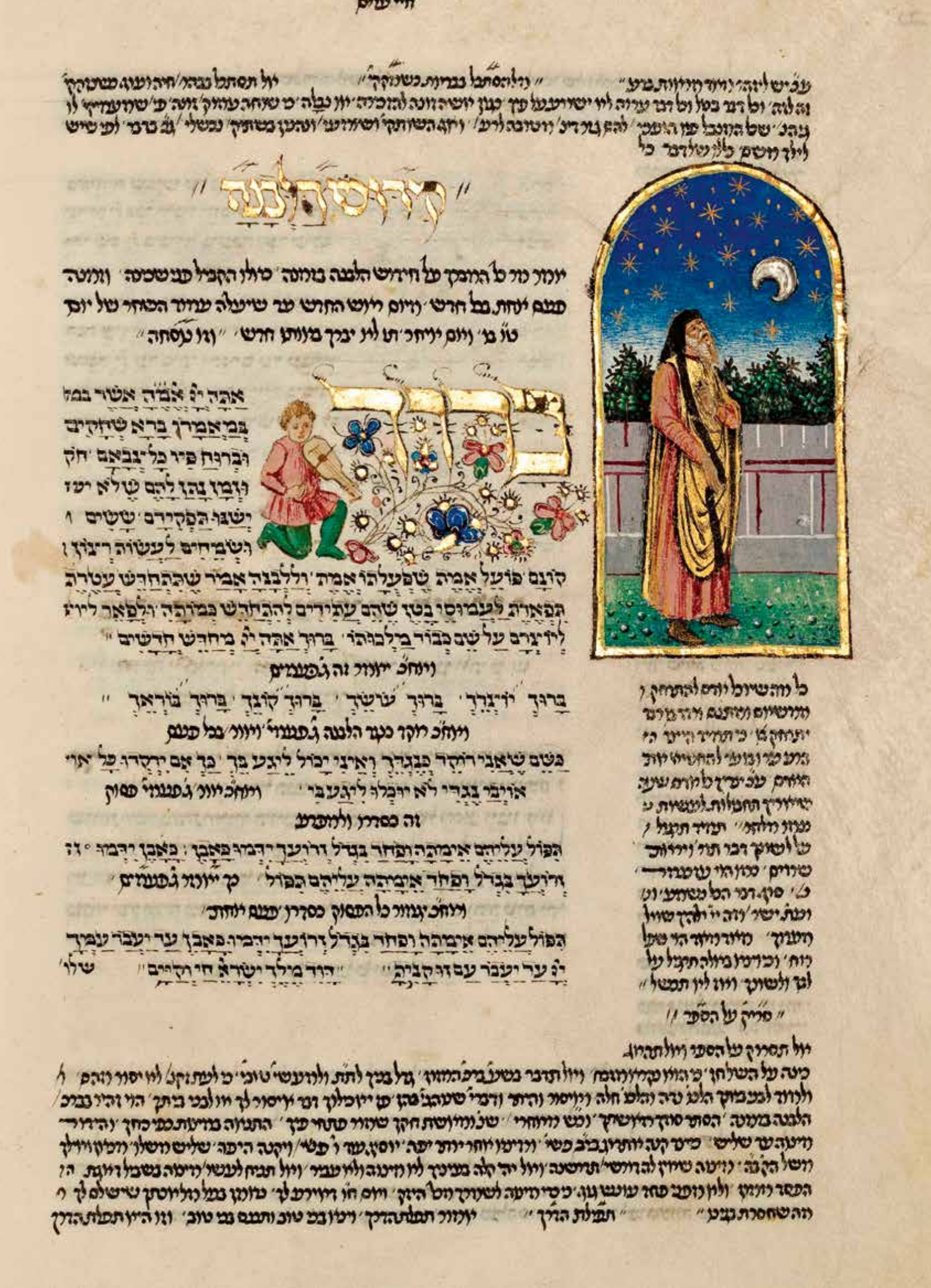
1478–1480, in the Rothschild Miscellany (Note: The Israel Museum's Wing of Jewish Life proposed sending a facsimile of this page into space with Artemis I. Nizza-Caplan, Anna (Winter 2022-2023). "Moonstruck: Curators Gazing Starward!". Israel Museum Magazine (English). pp. 71-72.)

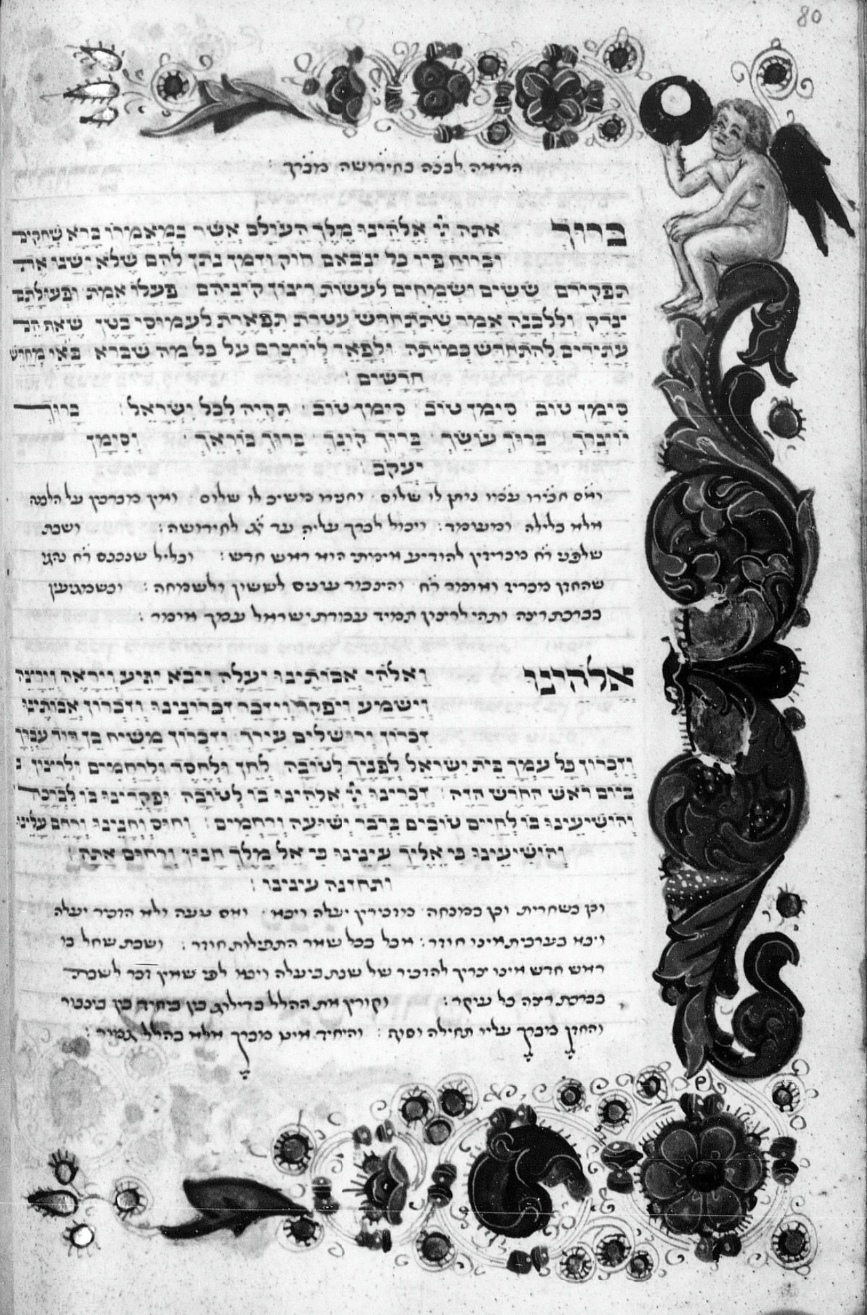
1480 (Pesaro), text by Abraham ben Matityahu Trèves Tzarfati (Note: For an undecorated Kiddush levana by the same scribe, see MS Kaufmann A380 f. 50r. This scribe refers to his father by the well-wishing ישר״ו, indicating that Matityahu was still alive when the latter manuscript was completed in 1481. "Mattityahu" and "Abraham" were traditional names in the famous Trèves rabbinical family; see Horowitz, Yehoshua (2007). "Treves". Encyclopedia Judaica. 2nd edition. pp. 134–135.)

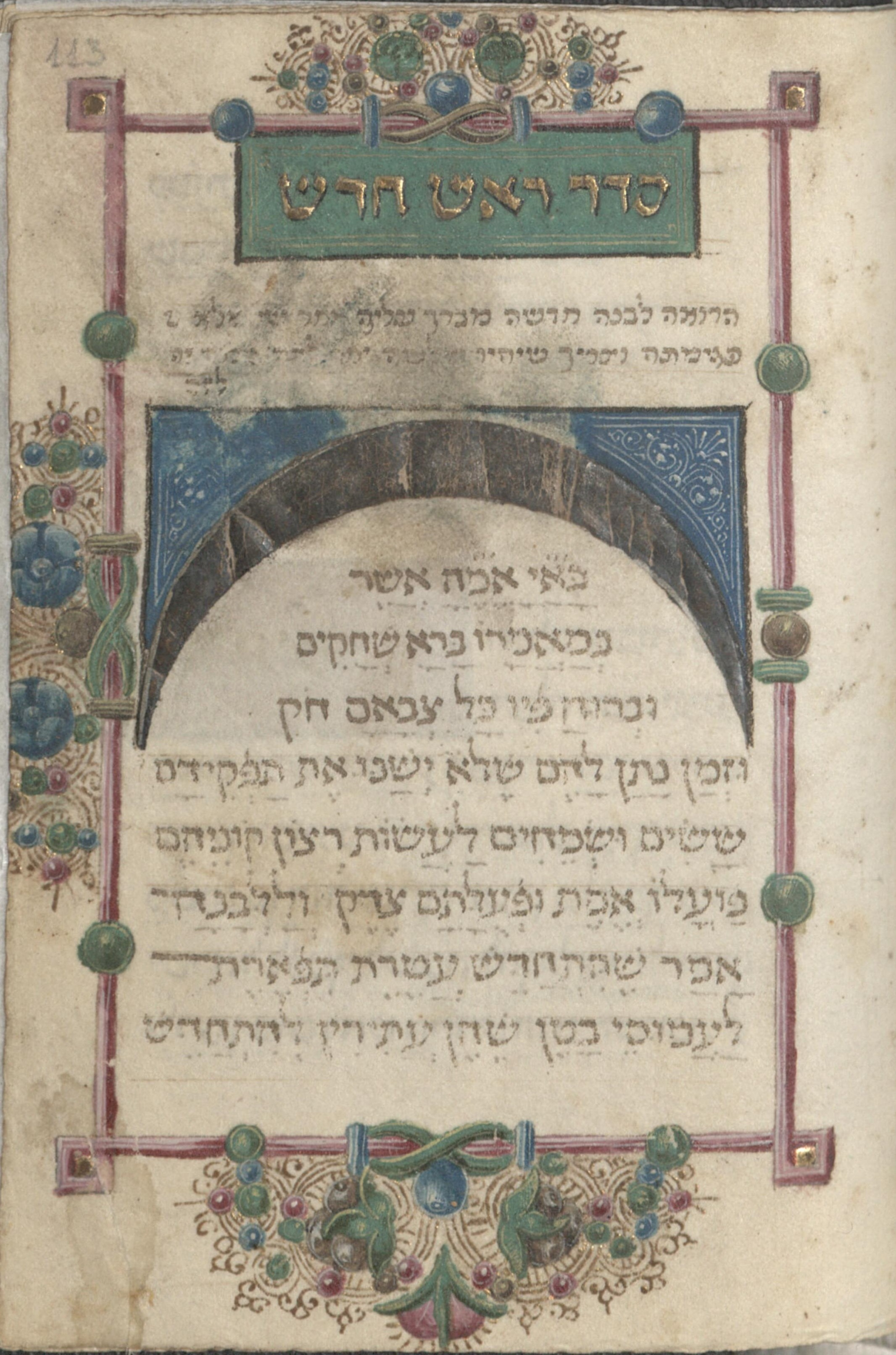
1480 (Mantua), by Abraham Farissol (Note: Farissol's 1471 copy for a woman, MS JTS 8255 f. 63v, was included above. That version contains only the Talmudic blessing, but in 1480 he supplemented it with "Blessed be your Creator . . ." and the exchange of greetings. In 1473, Farissol had copied the Alilot Devarim, which critiques "Blessed by your Creator . . ." Moritz Steinschneider proposed that Farissol was in fact the original author of the Alilot Devarim. Ibid. (March–April 1864). "Periodische Literatur". Hebraeische Bibliographie. 7 (38): 28. Retrieved July 23, 2025 - via Internet Archive. Note that Steinschneider is suspicious of the 1468 manuscript's date, but for no good reason. He has misread "Nissan" as "Sivan".)

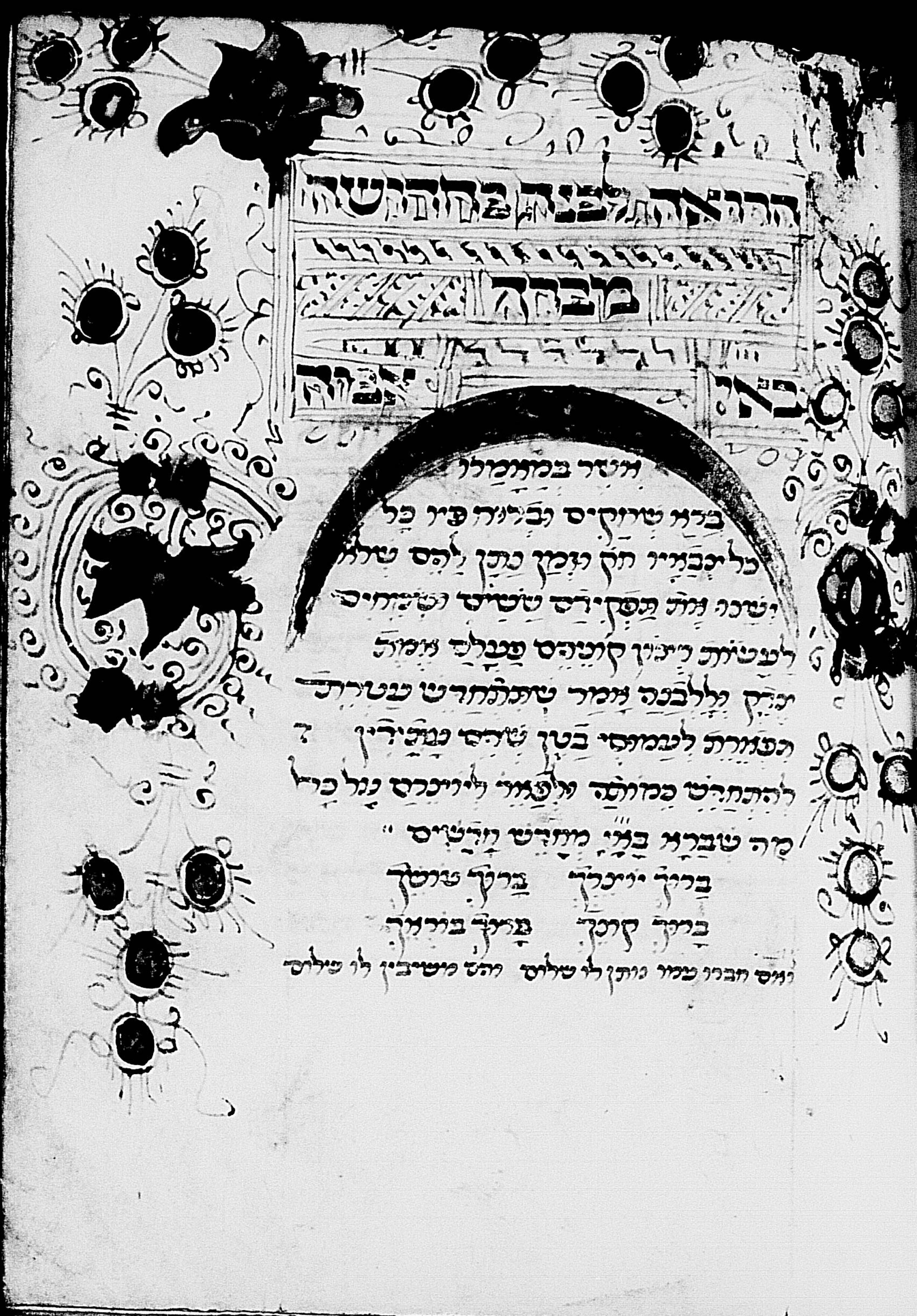
15th century (Italy)

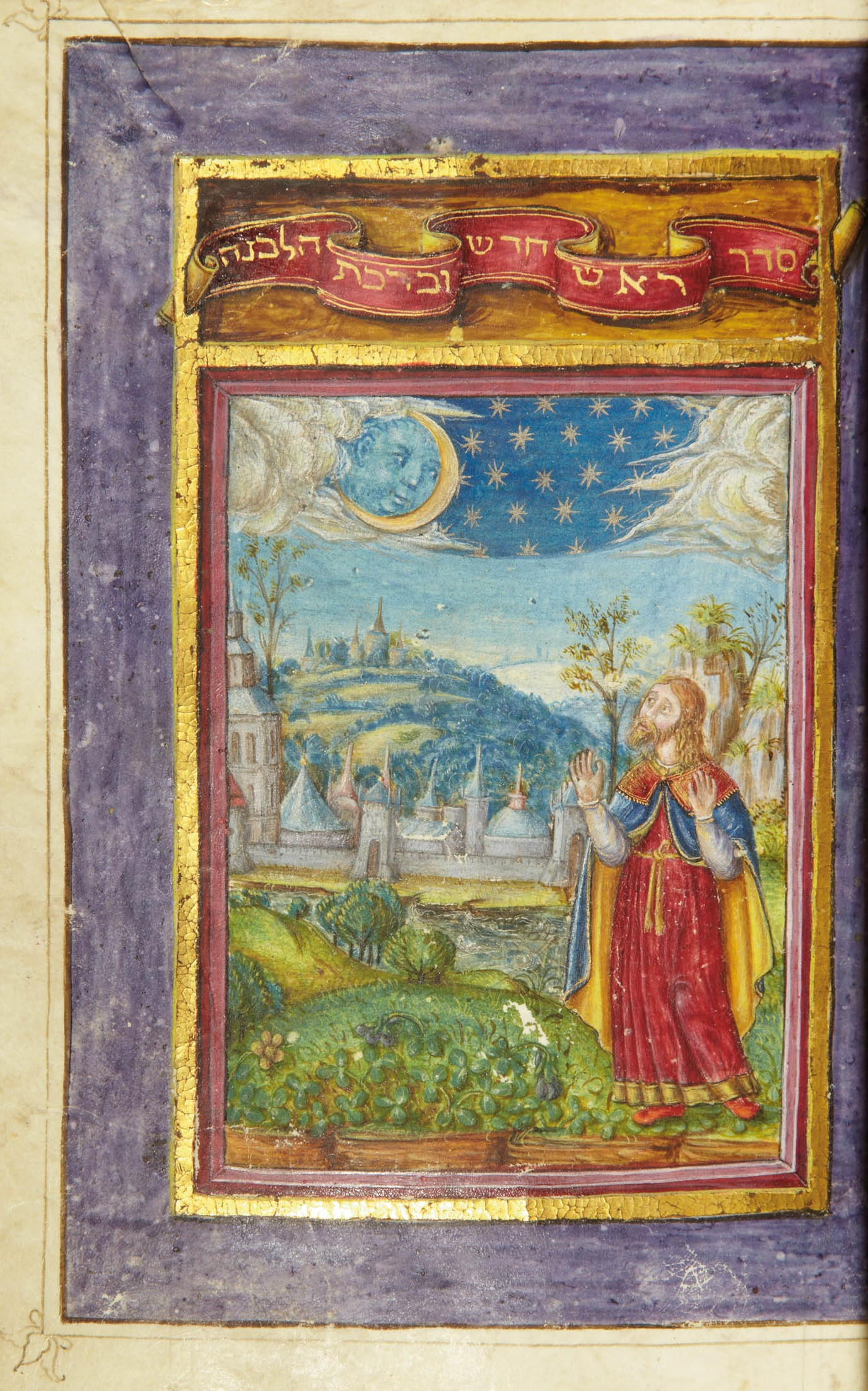
1490s (Florence), by Giovanni di Giuliano Boccardi, "one of the last representatives of the golden age of Florentine renaissance illumination"

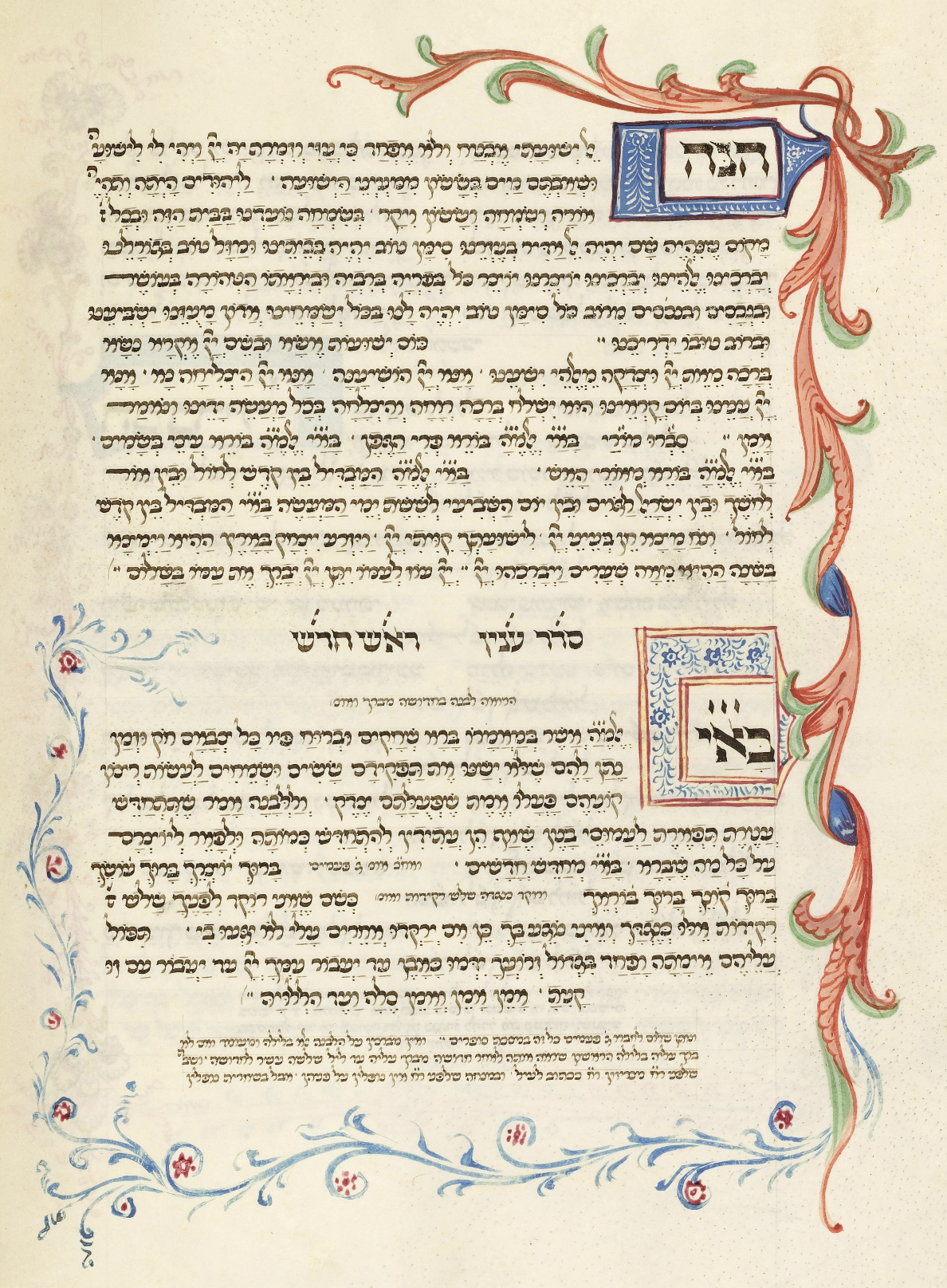
1490, by Abraham Judah ben Yehiel of Camerino. In the Rothschild Mahzor.

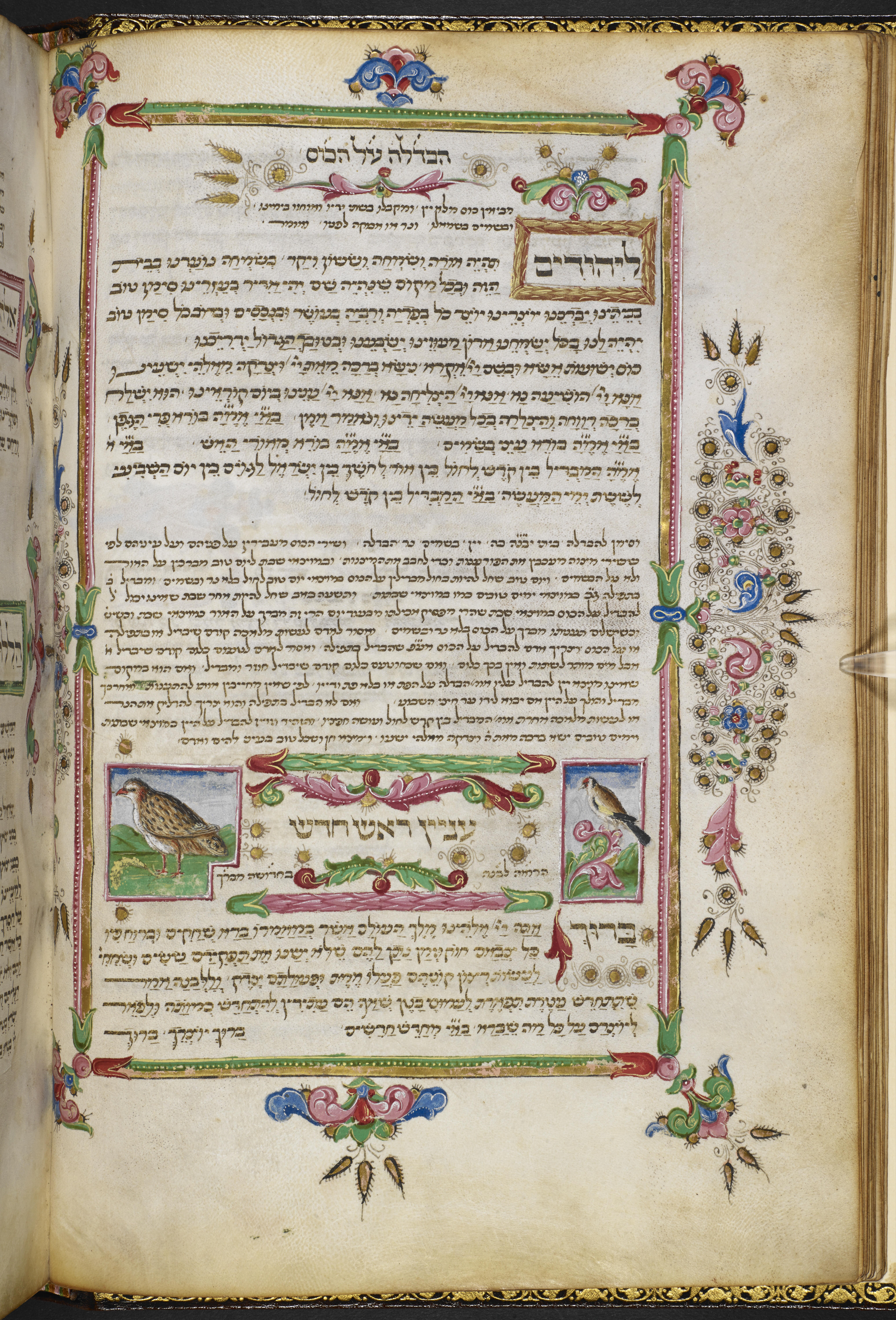
15th century (Ferrara?)

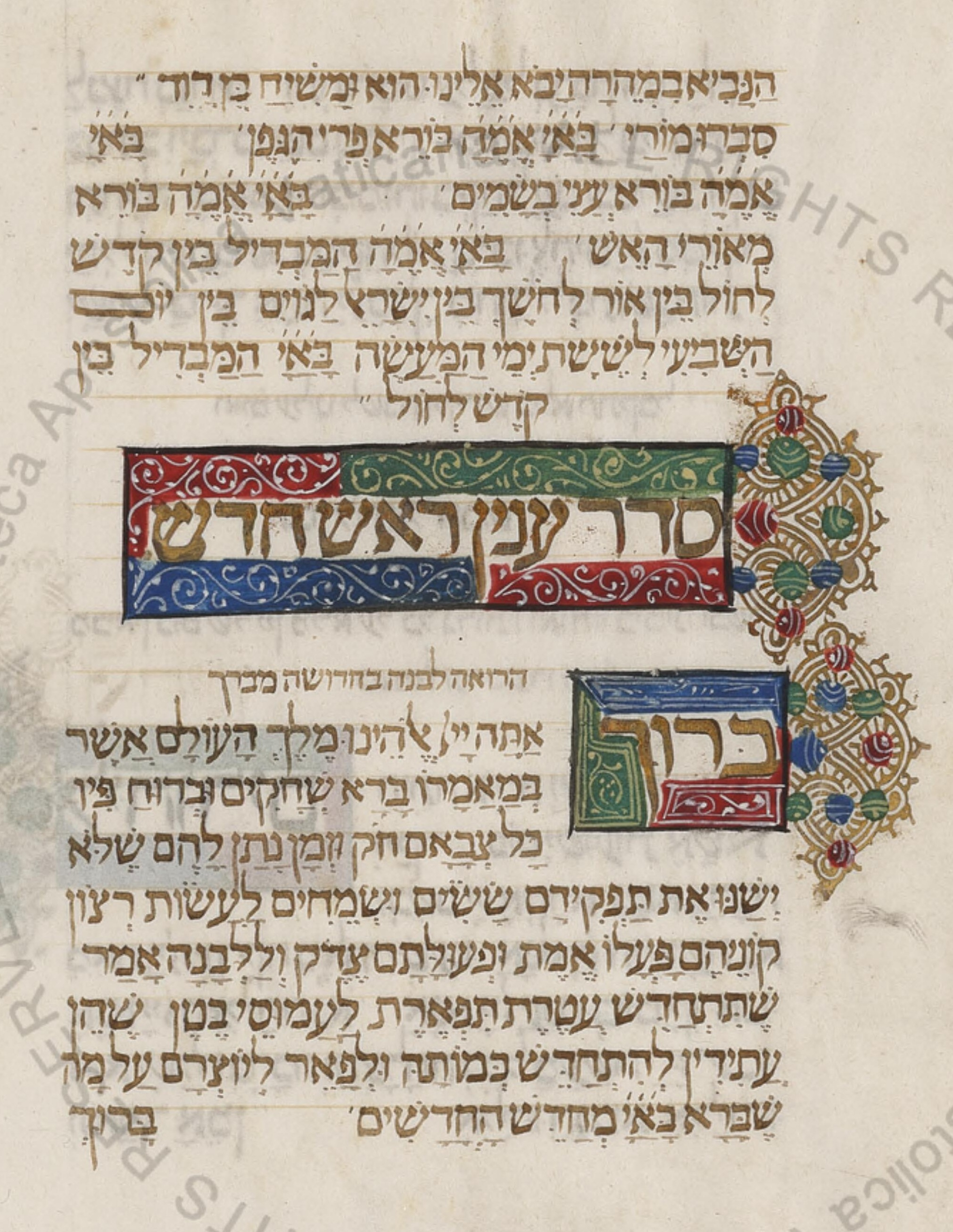
1512 (Ferrara), by Moses ben Hayyim Aqrish (Note: See MS Musée de Cluny 13995 f. 67v and MSS Free Library of Philadelphia 141 p. 78 (scan) and 142 p. 66 (scan) for similar work by Aqrish. Cf. the following image.)

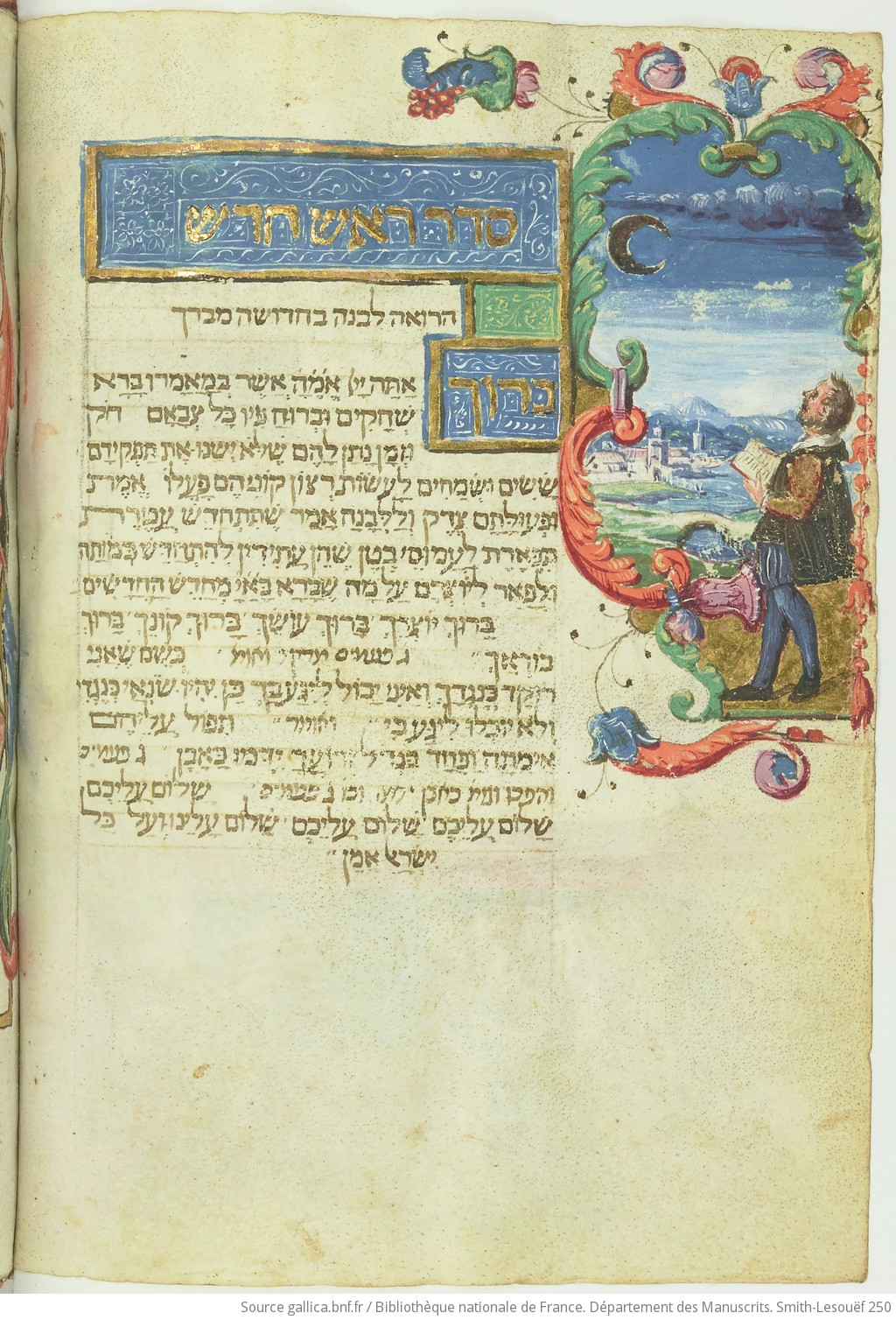
1520 (Italy), text by Moshe ben Hayyim Aqrish

== Woodcuts (1525–1775) ==
Woodcuts depicting Kiddush levana began to appear in Jewish books in the 16th century, especially in editions of the Minhagim-bukh. The form of these depictions follows a template established by early woodcuts of astrologers. The participants wear Sabbath finery, as instructed by Soferim. They stand outdoors, as recommended since the 13th century. Stars are shown along with the moon, to link Kiddush levana to the end of the Sabbath (which is determined by the appearance of stars), and to symbolically link the Sabbath and Kiddush levana "to one another as tokens of gratitude for the weekly and monthly cycles of time". Partial cloud cover is included in reference to the threat that clouds will obscure the moon, but the sky is always shown clear enough to allow for Kiddush levana to be recited.

=== Gallery ===
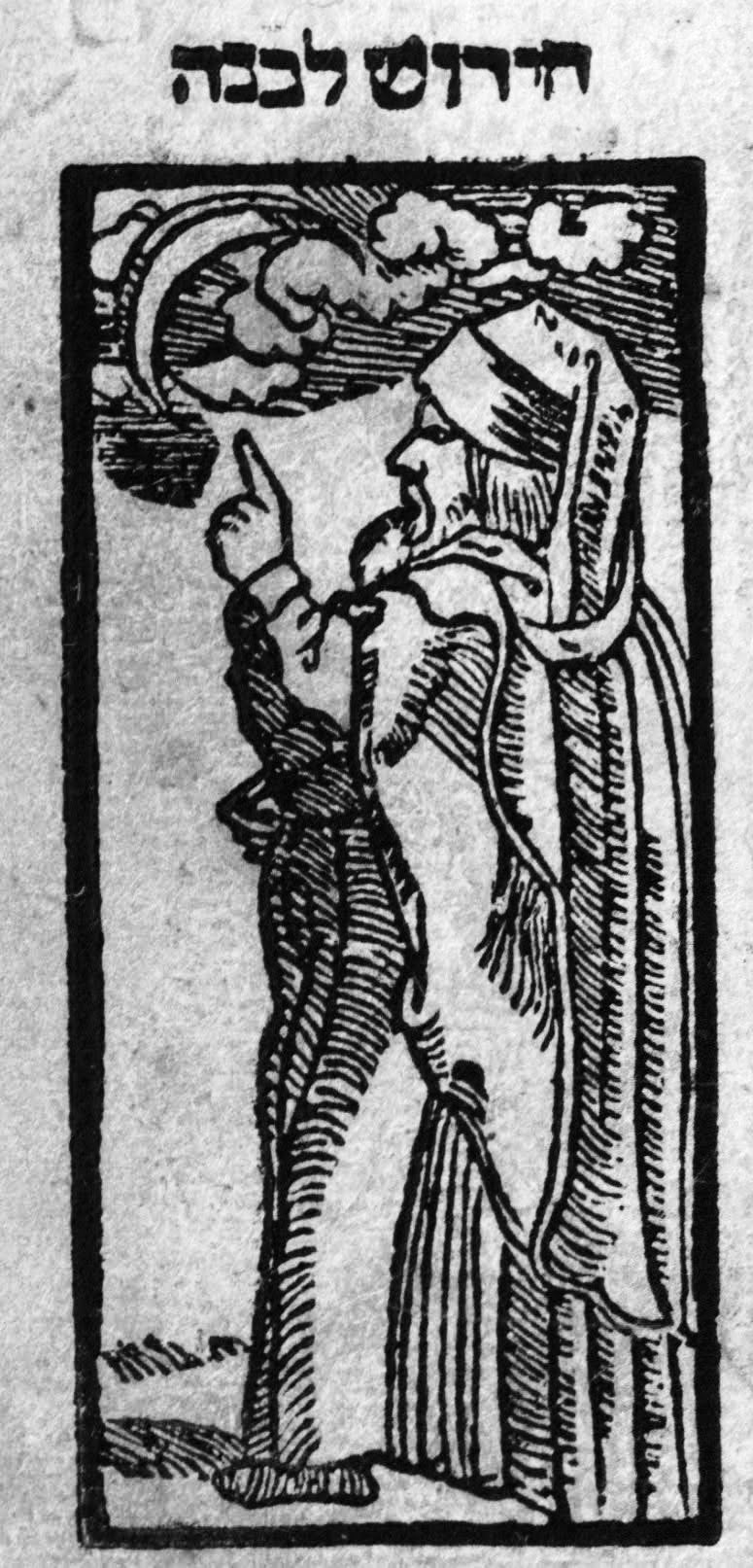
1526, in the Prague Haggadah

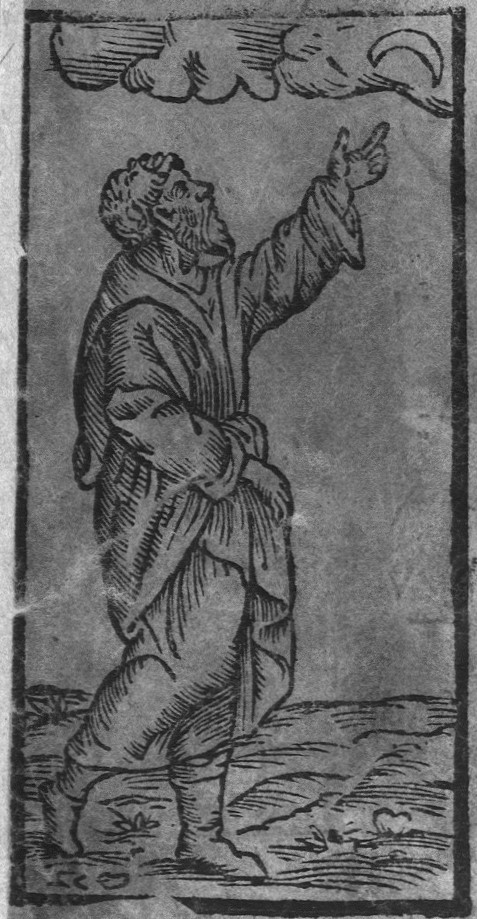
1560 (Mantua), by "Artist A" of this work.

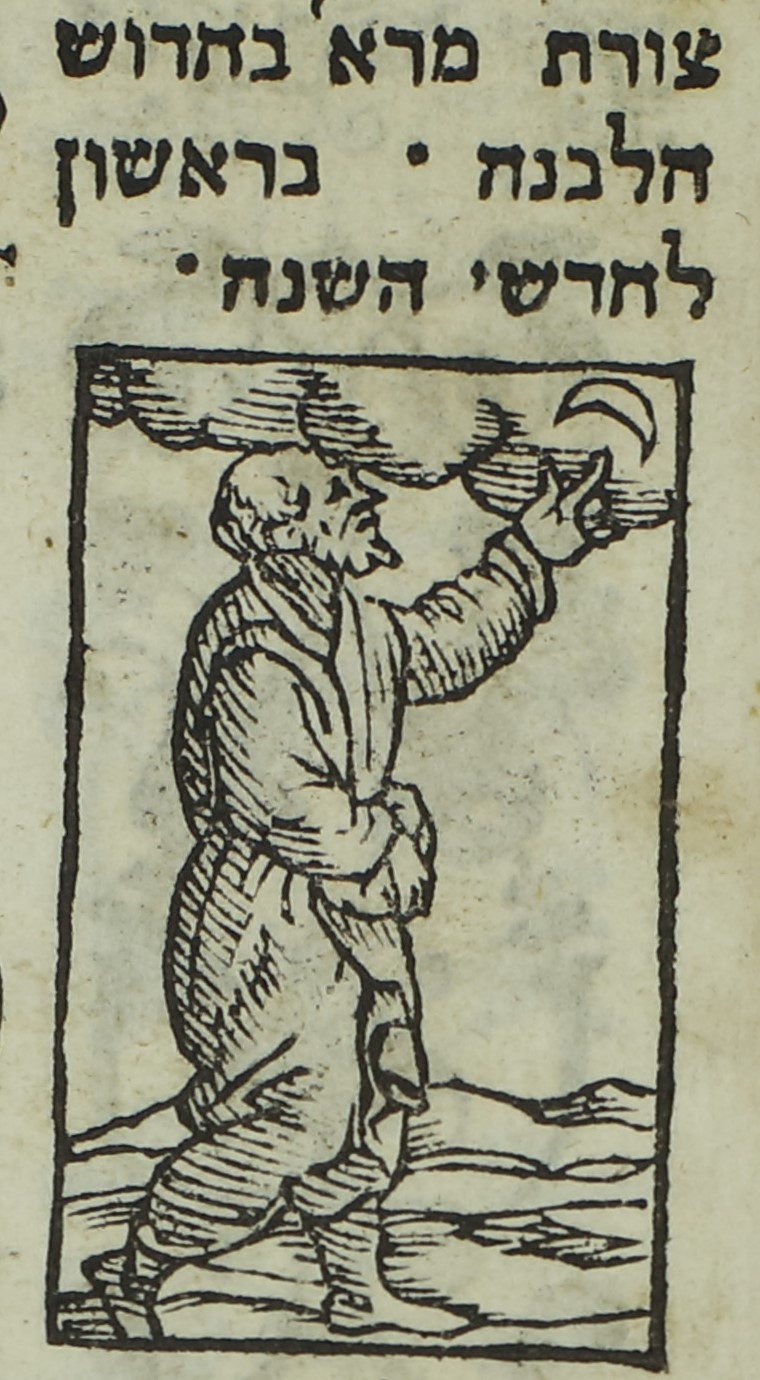
1601 (Venice). This haggadah reuses the same woodcut to depict Pharaoh's astrologers and Terah.
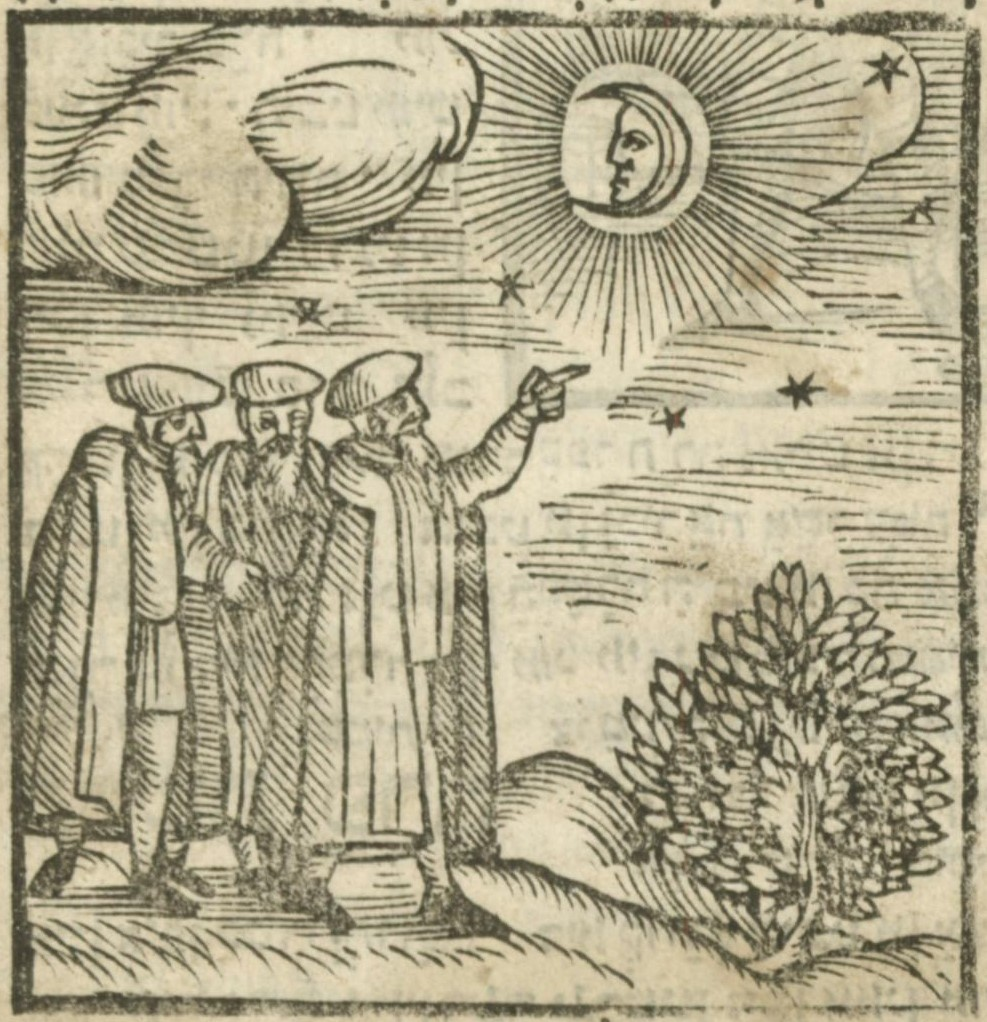
1593 (Venice) (Note: A similar image appears in MS Paris 586, a Yiddish manuscript produced before 1503, on f. 78v with the incomplete caption אִיז נַאַכְט מַן מַג וואל אוֹרַן [די]א שְׁטַעְרַן זִיין אִם הִימַל, ". . . is night. One may well pray. Stars are in the sky". Diane Wolfthal has called it the "most unusual image of synagogue ritual" in that manuscript. The surrounding text relates to Sukkot, and Wolfthal writes that it "cannot represent the blessing of the moon" but must instead show men realizing that night has fallen before returning to the synagogue for Maariv. Ibid. (2004). Picturing Yiddish. pp. 41-42, 236. This 1593 woodcut has been reinterpreted in Mark Podwal's Blessing the New Moon, a digitial archival pigment print on paper. See here. Retrieved March 6, 2025 – via Skirball Museum.)

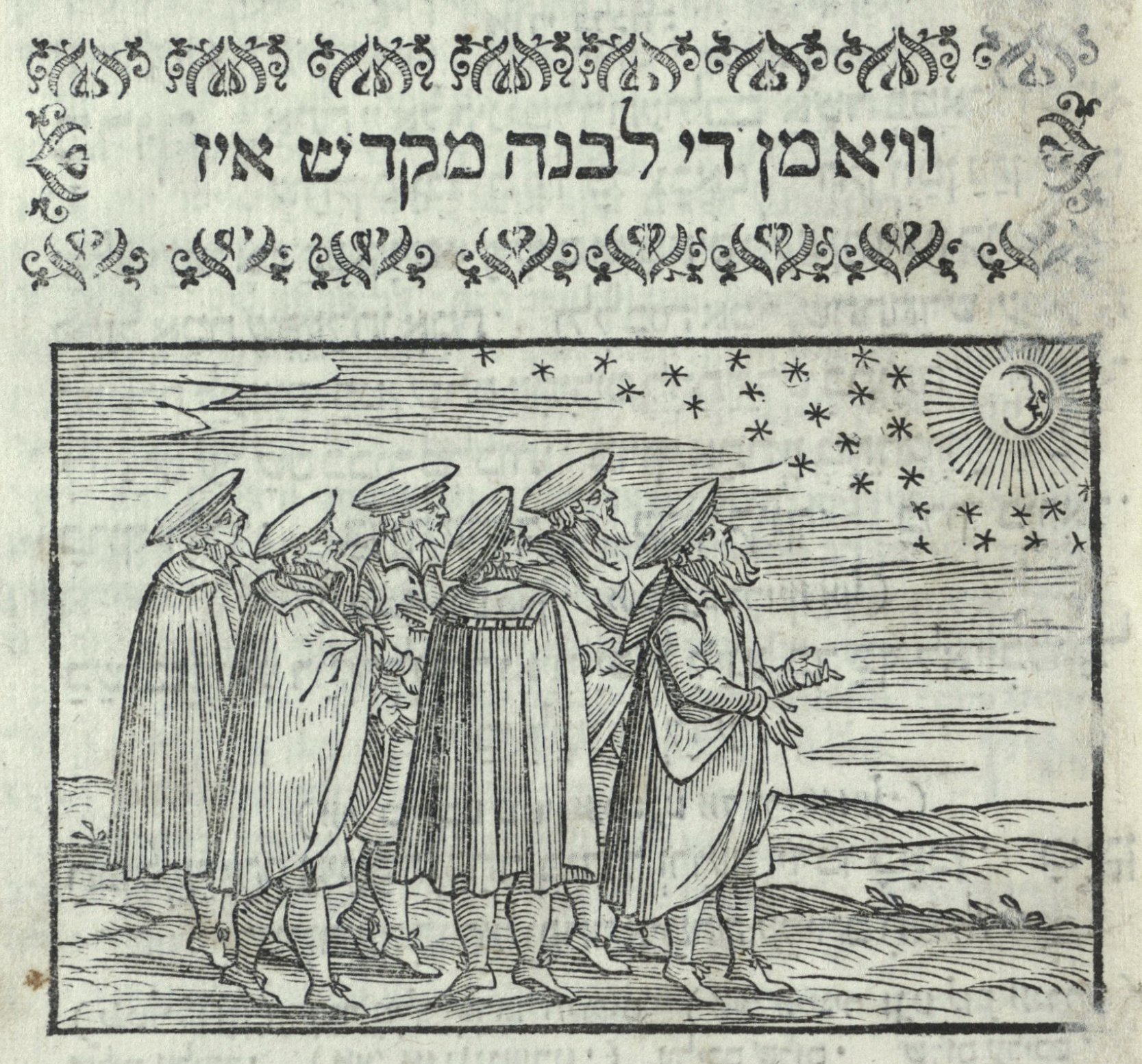
1601 (Venice)

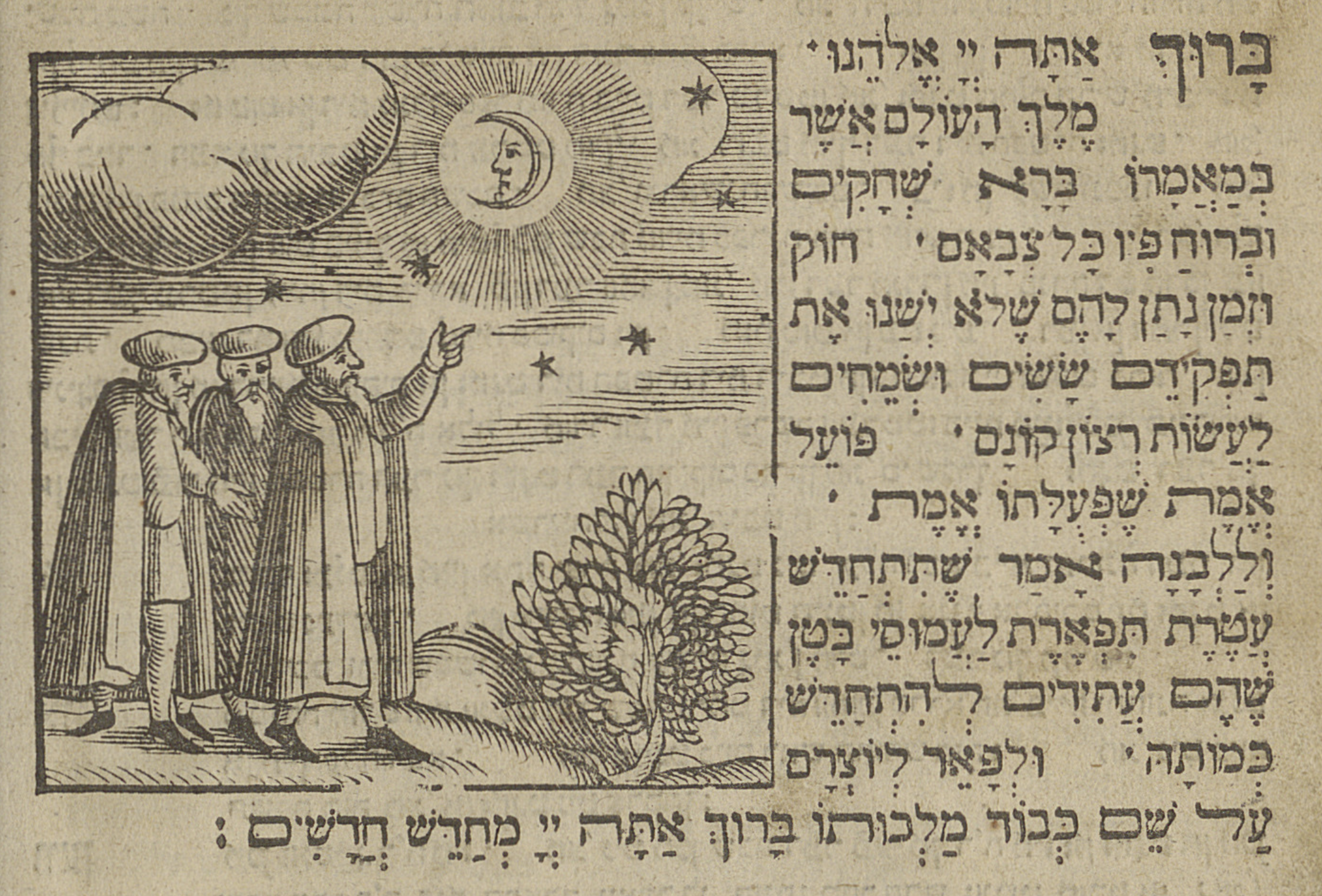
1645 (Amsterdam)

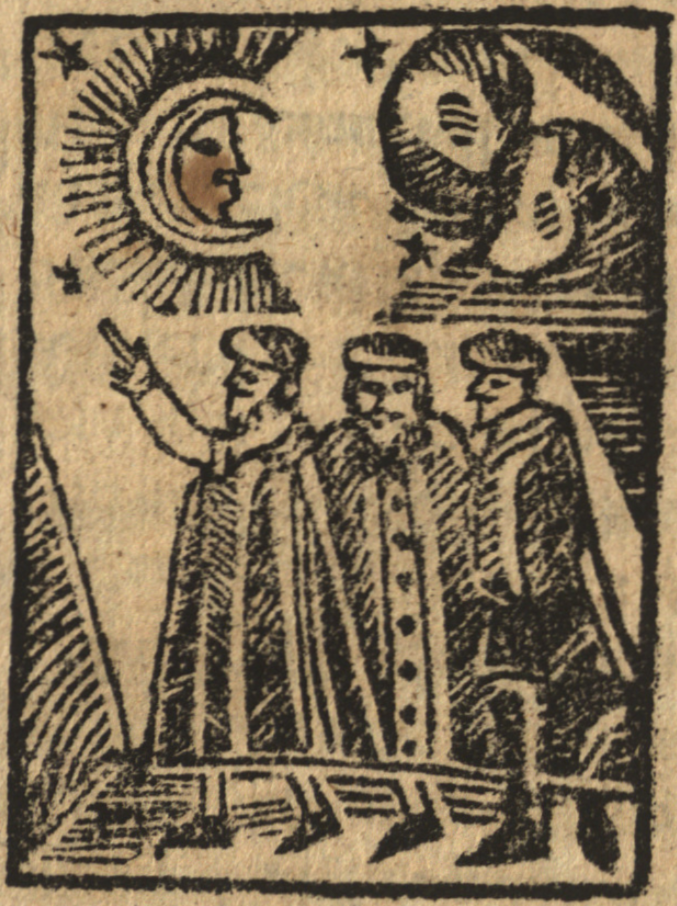
1660 (Prague)

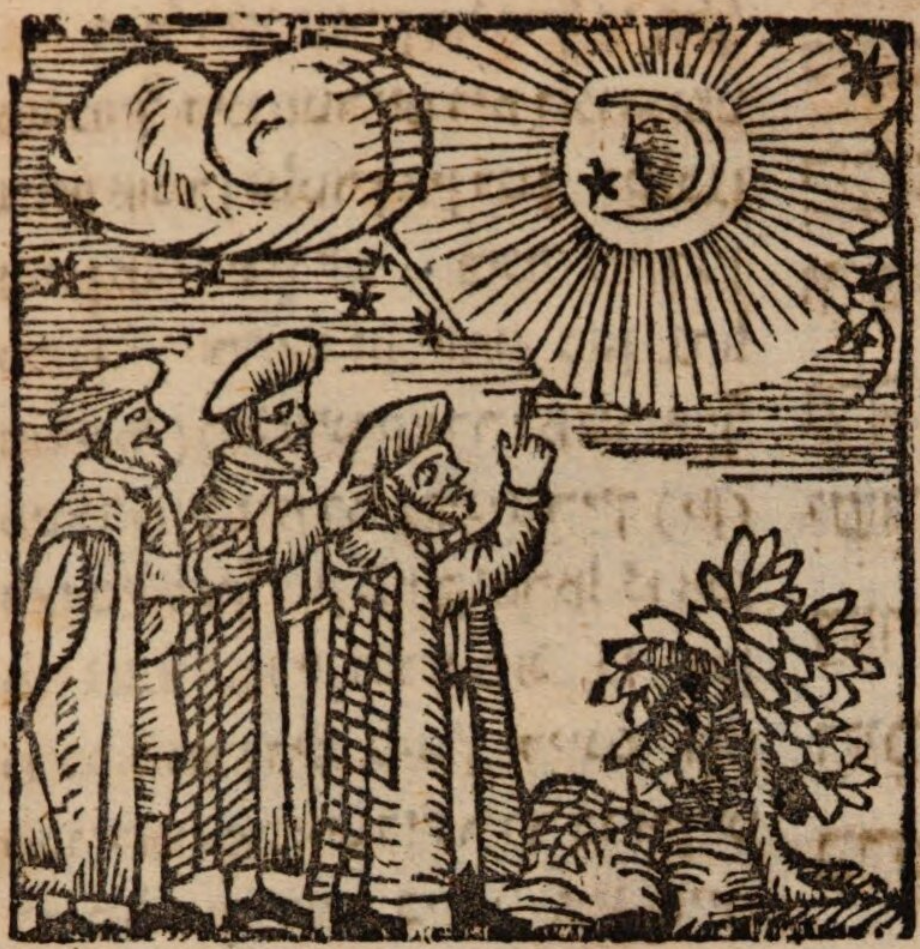
1669 (Sulzbach)

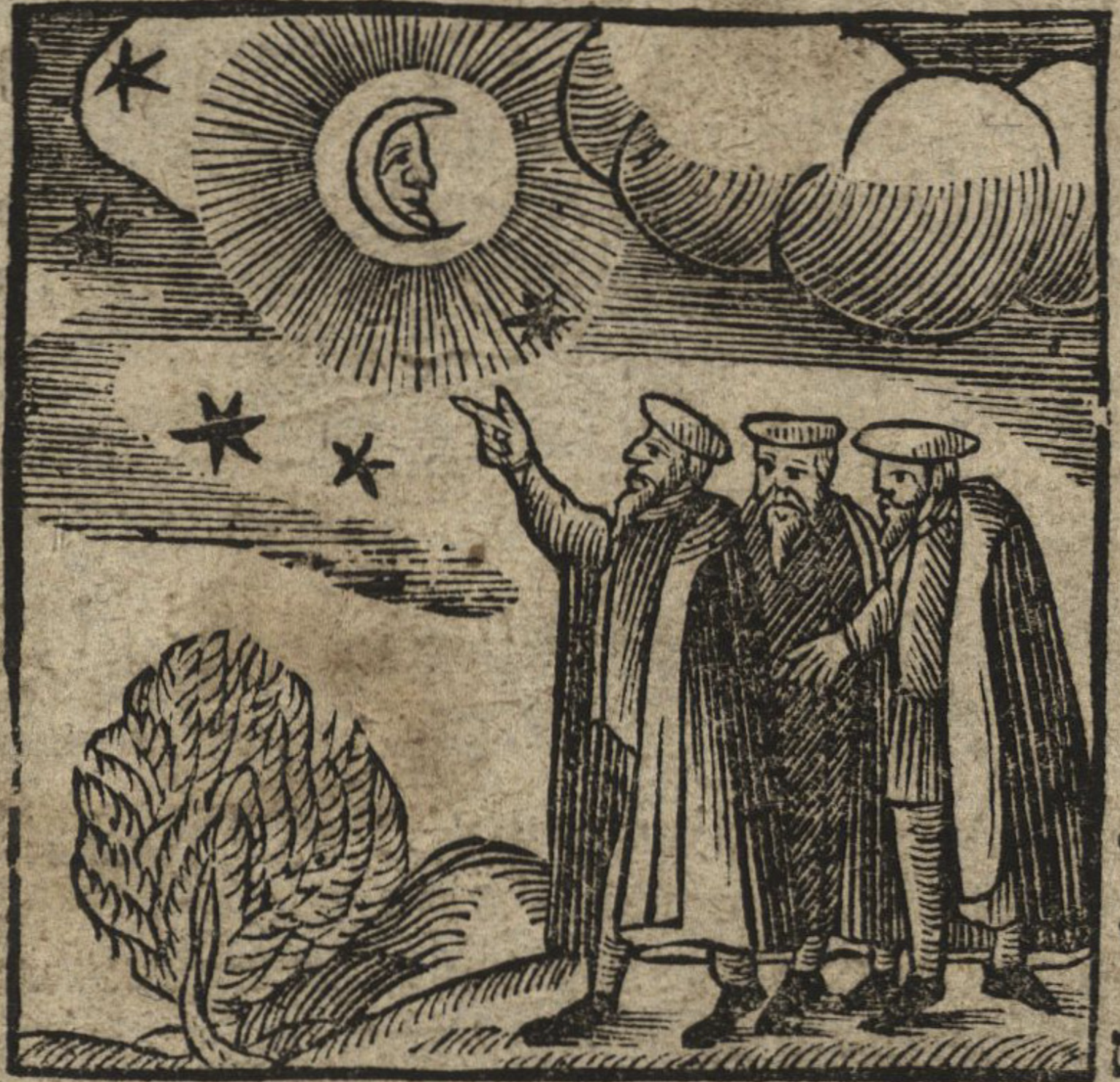
1690 (Frankfurt am Main)

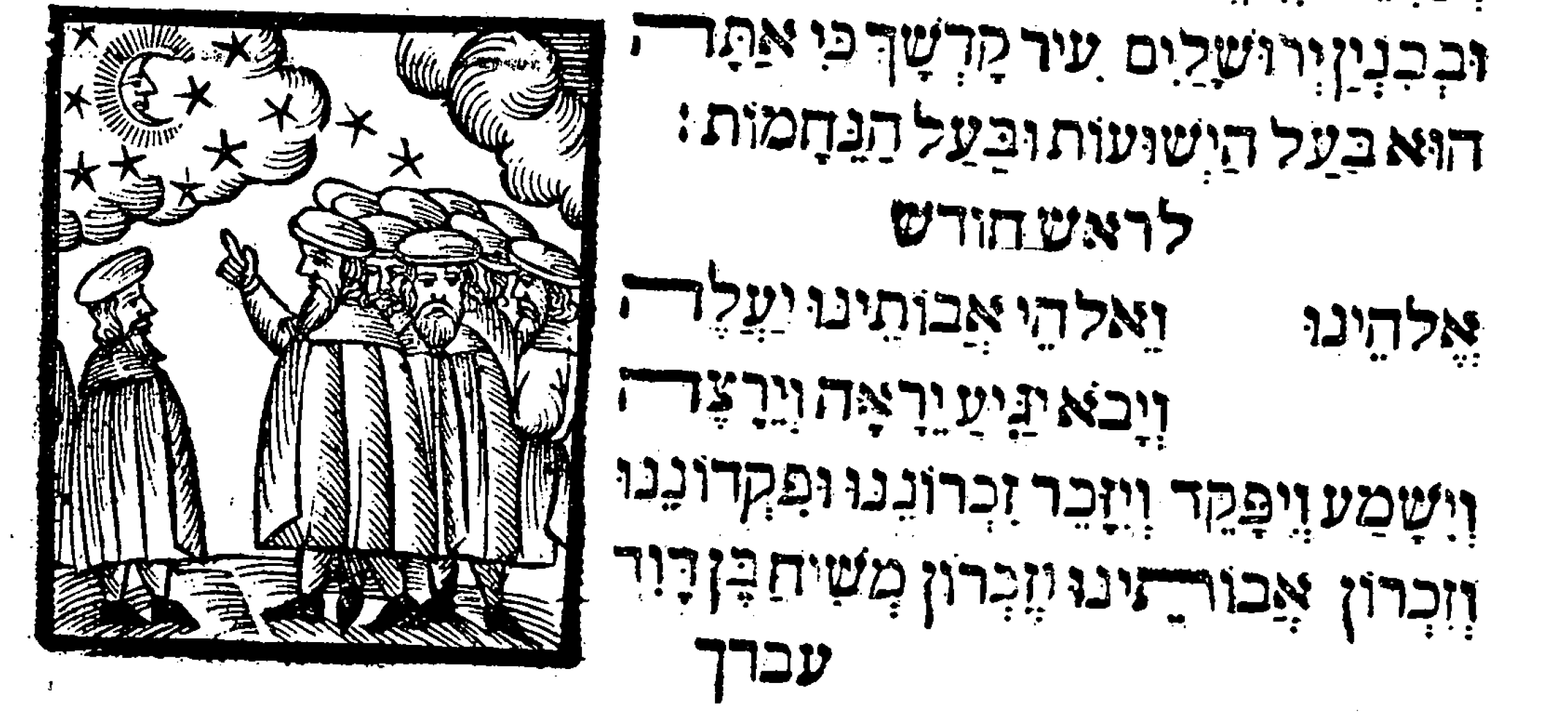
1692 (Dyhernfurth)

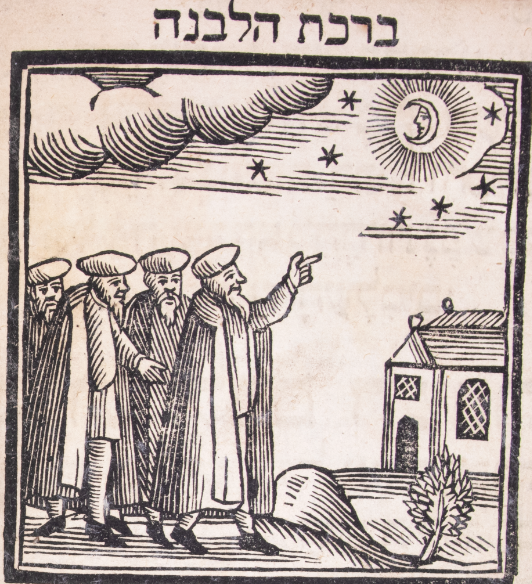
1707 (Amsterdam)

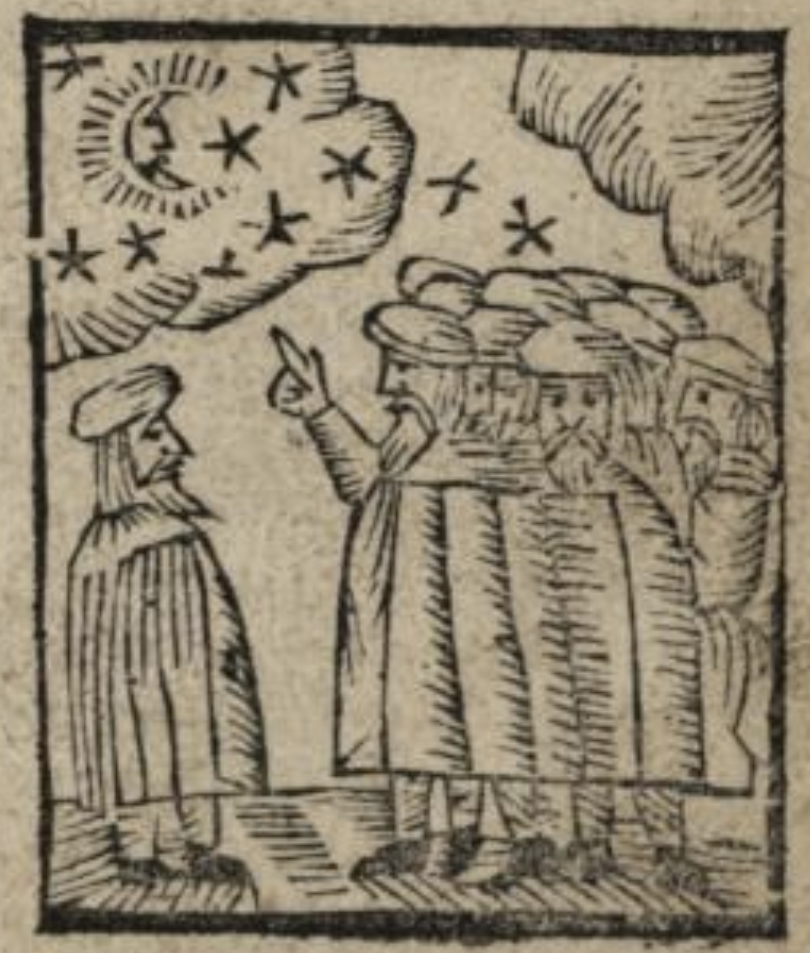
1707 (Frankfurt an der Oder)

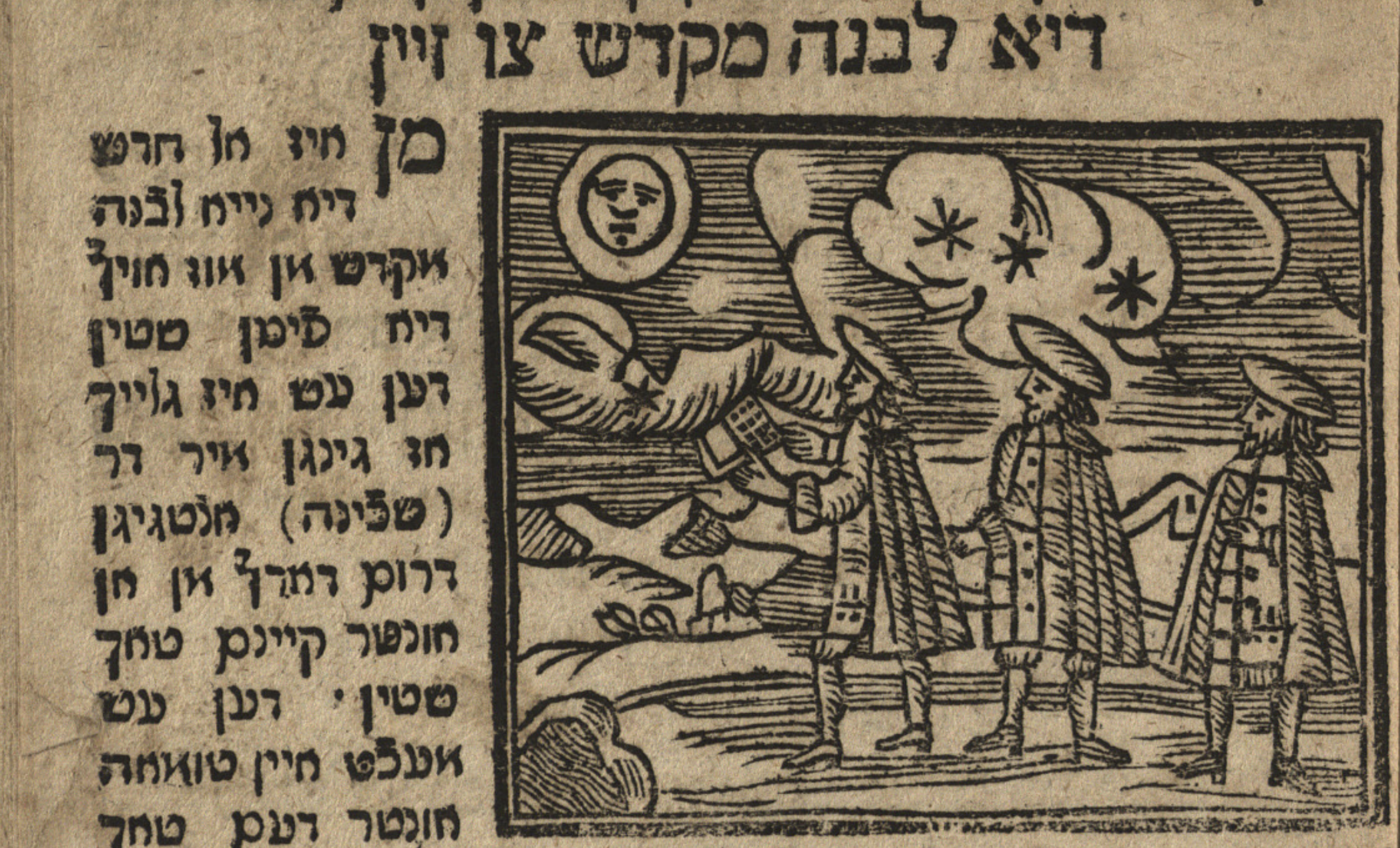
1708 (Frankfurt am Main)

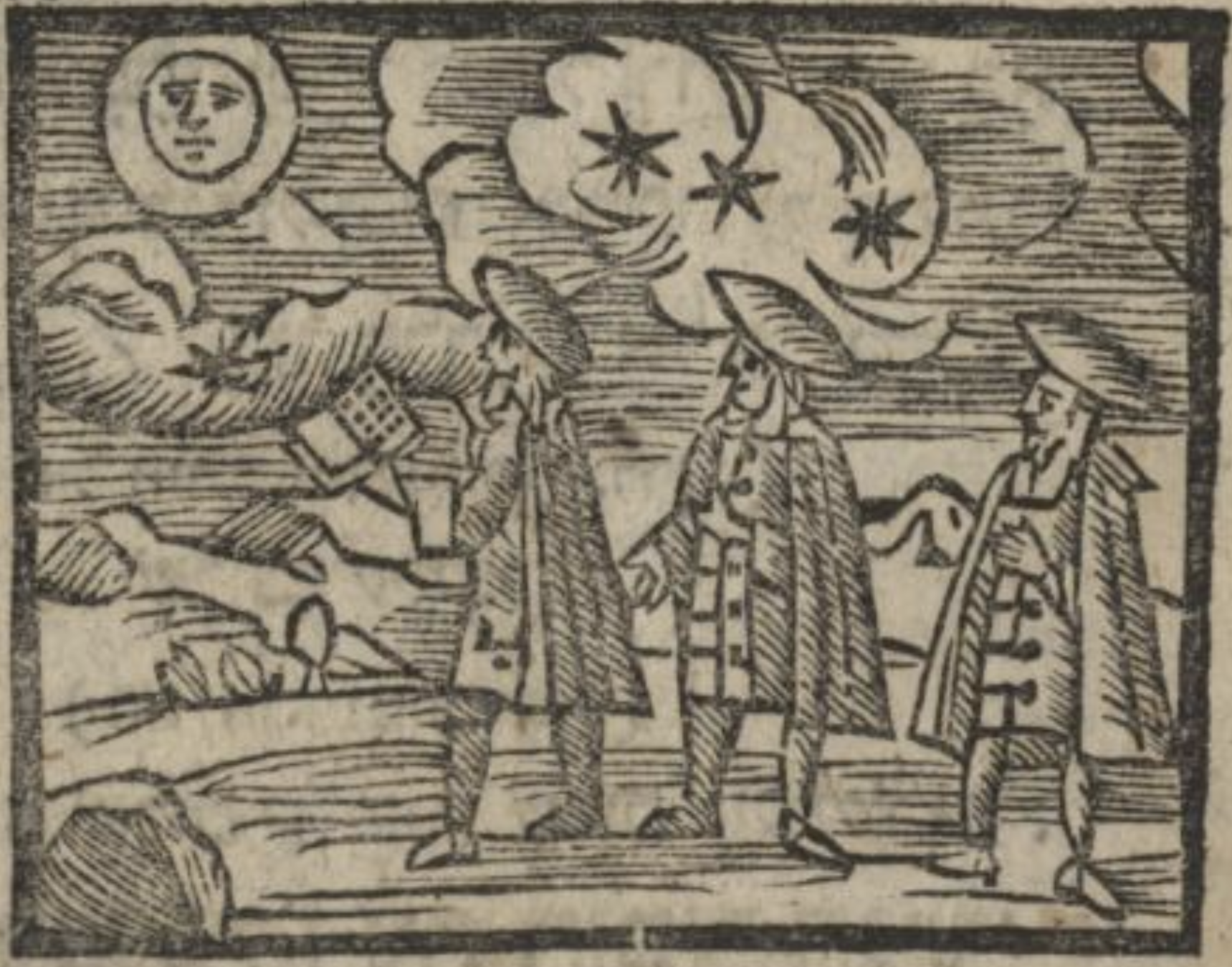
1715 (Frankfurt am Main)

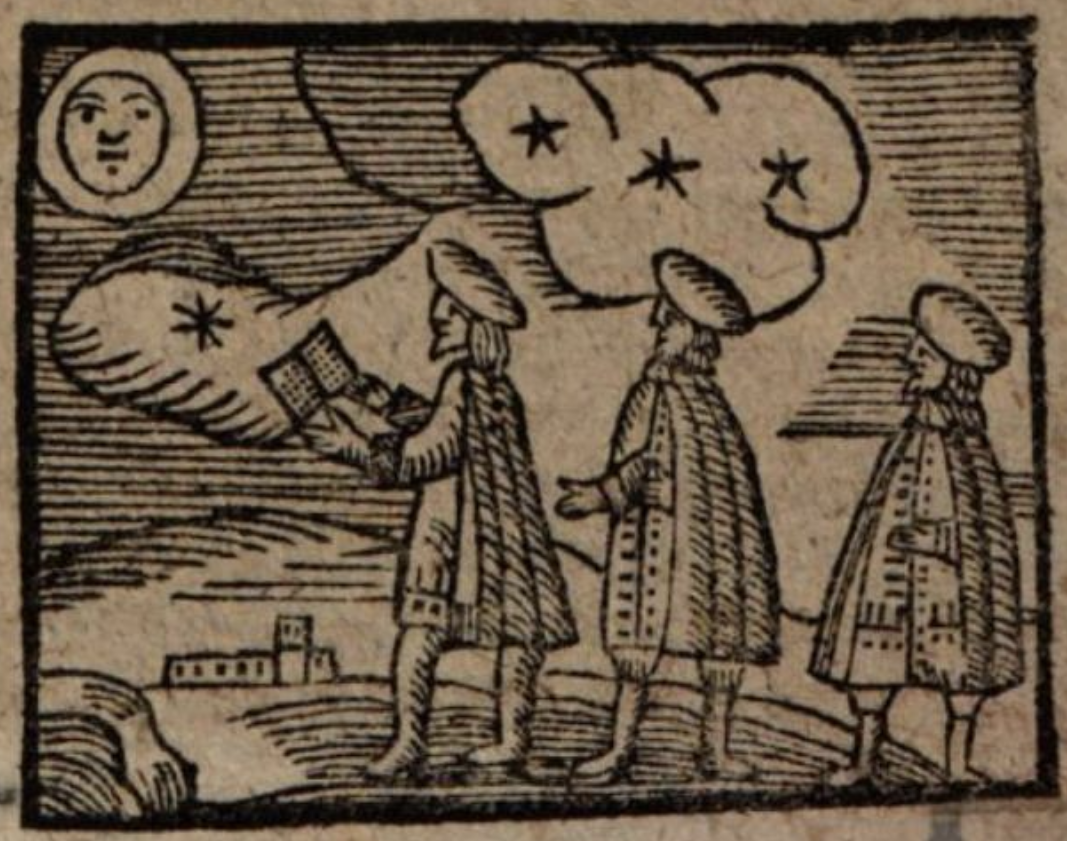
1722 (Frankfurt am Main)

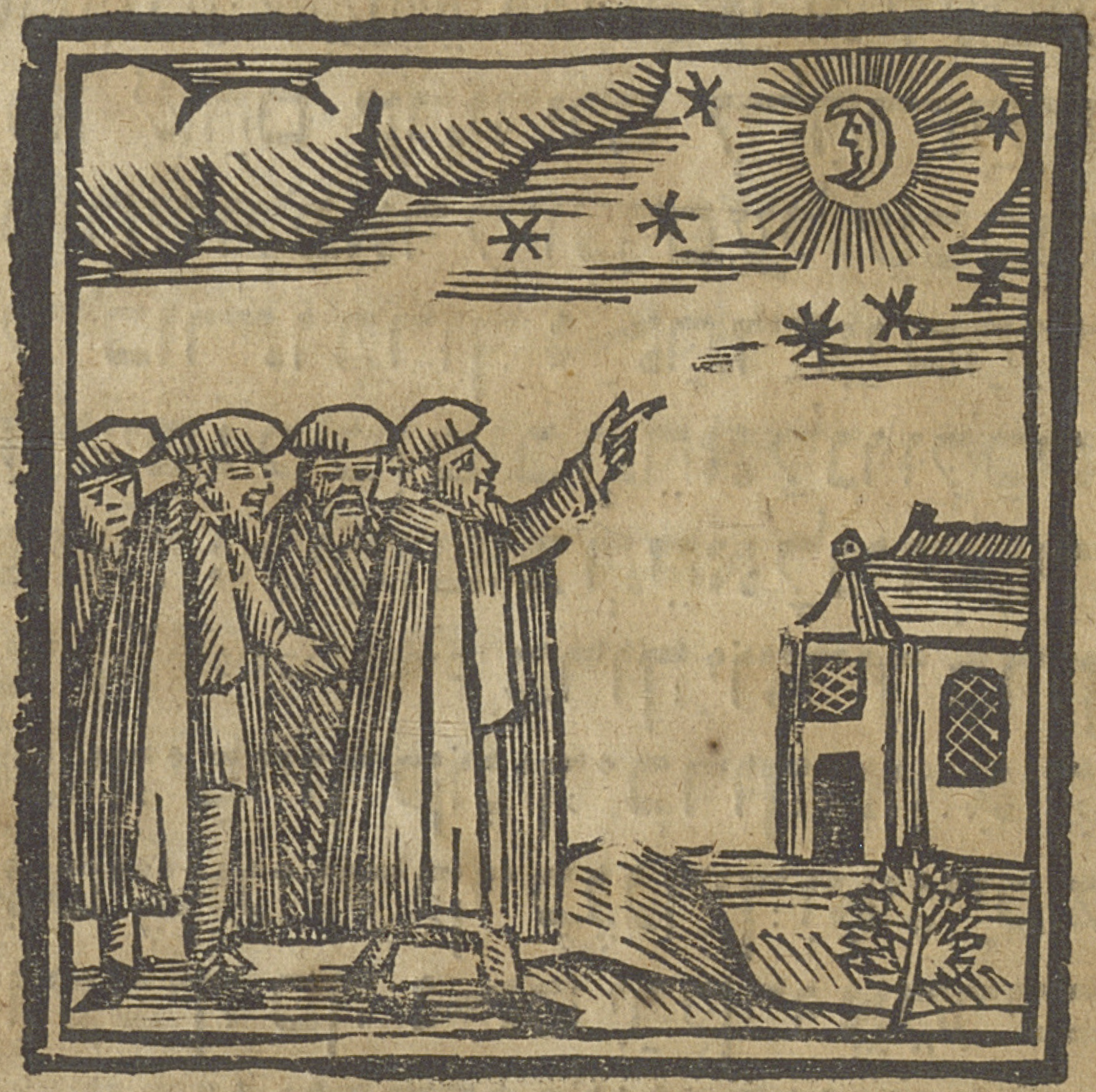
1723 (Amsterdam)

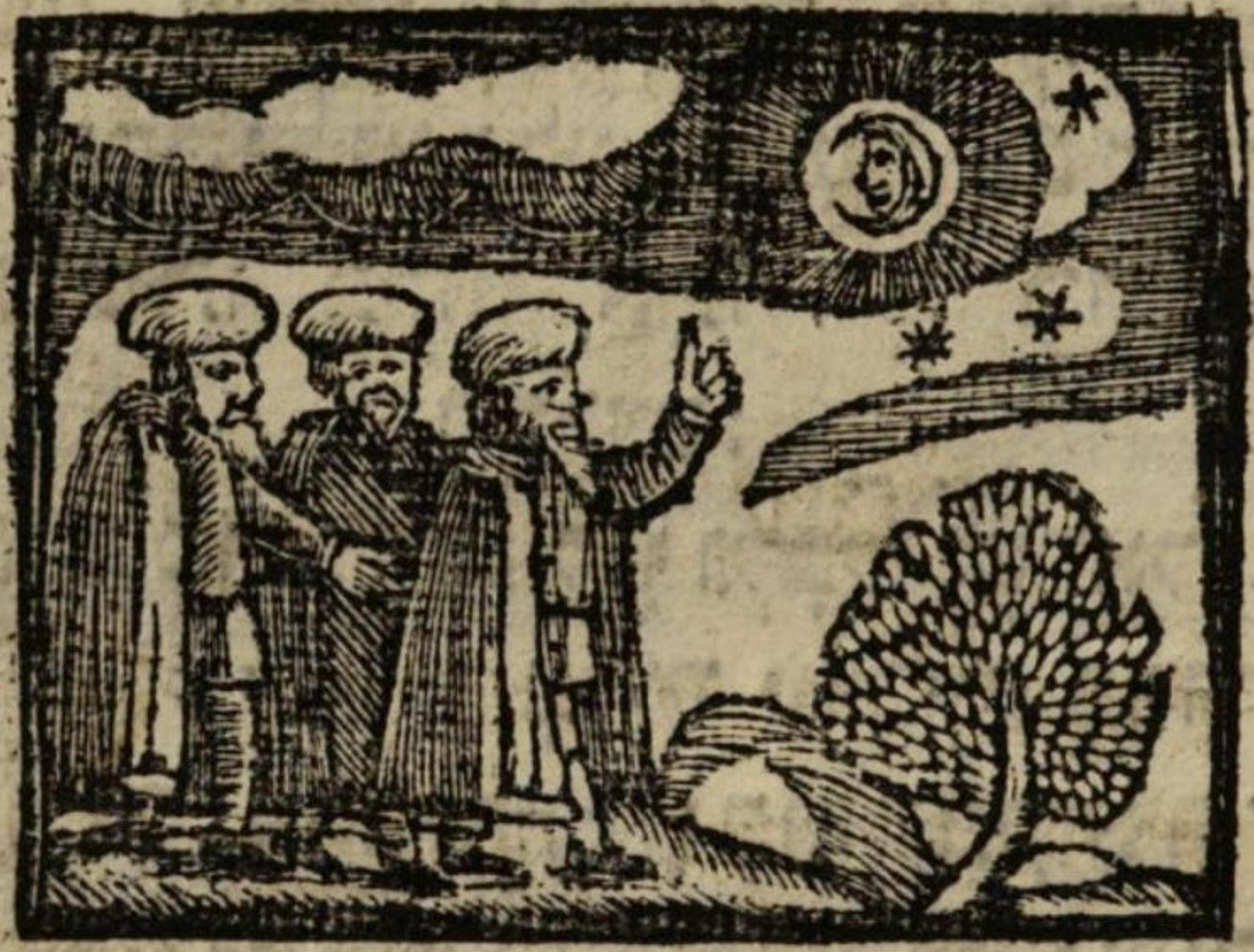
1768 (Amsterdam)

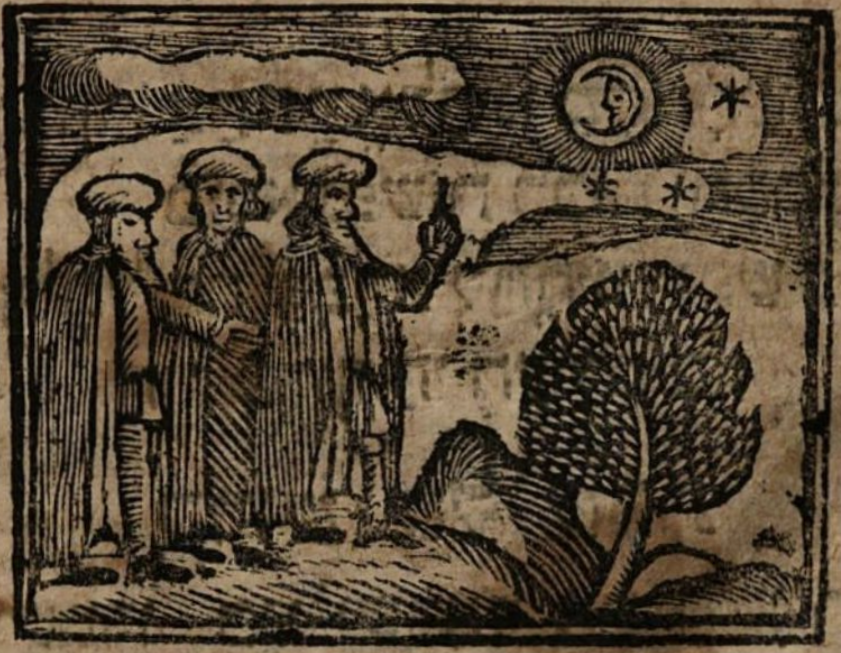
1775 (Amsterdam)

== Engravings (1685–1800) ==
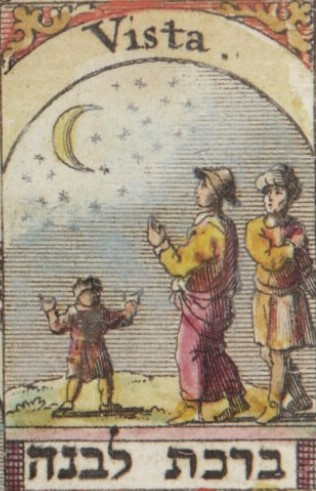
1687, by Benjamin Senior Godines, with watercolors

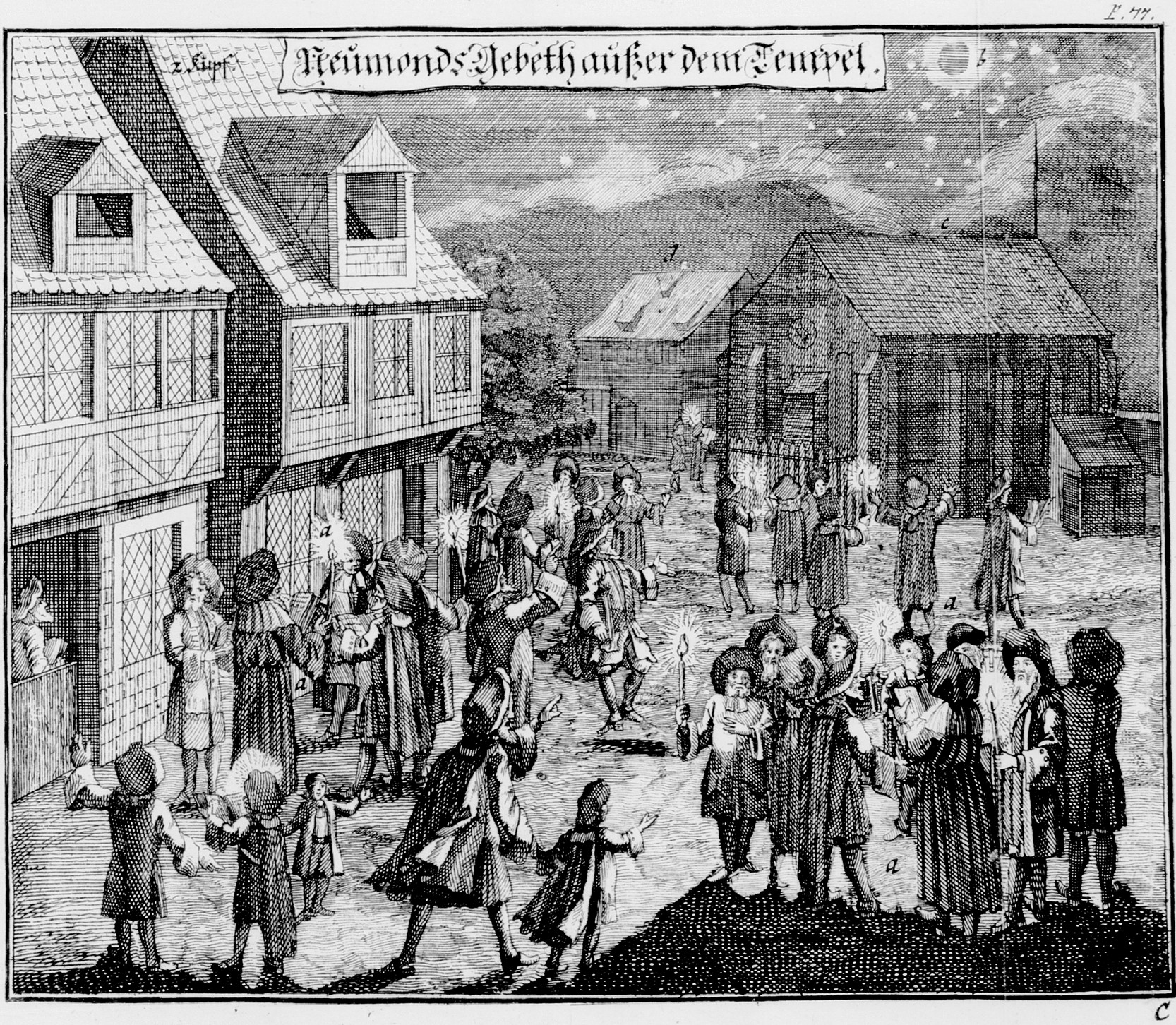
1720 (Fürth), by "C." (Note: Signed in the 1734 edition only.)

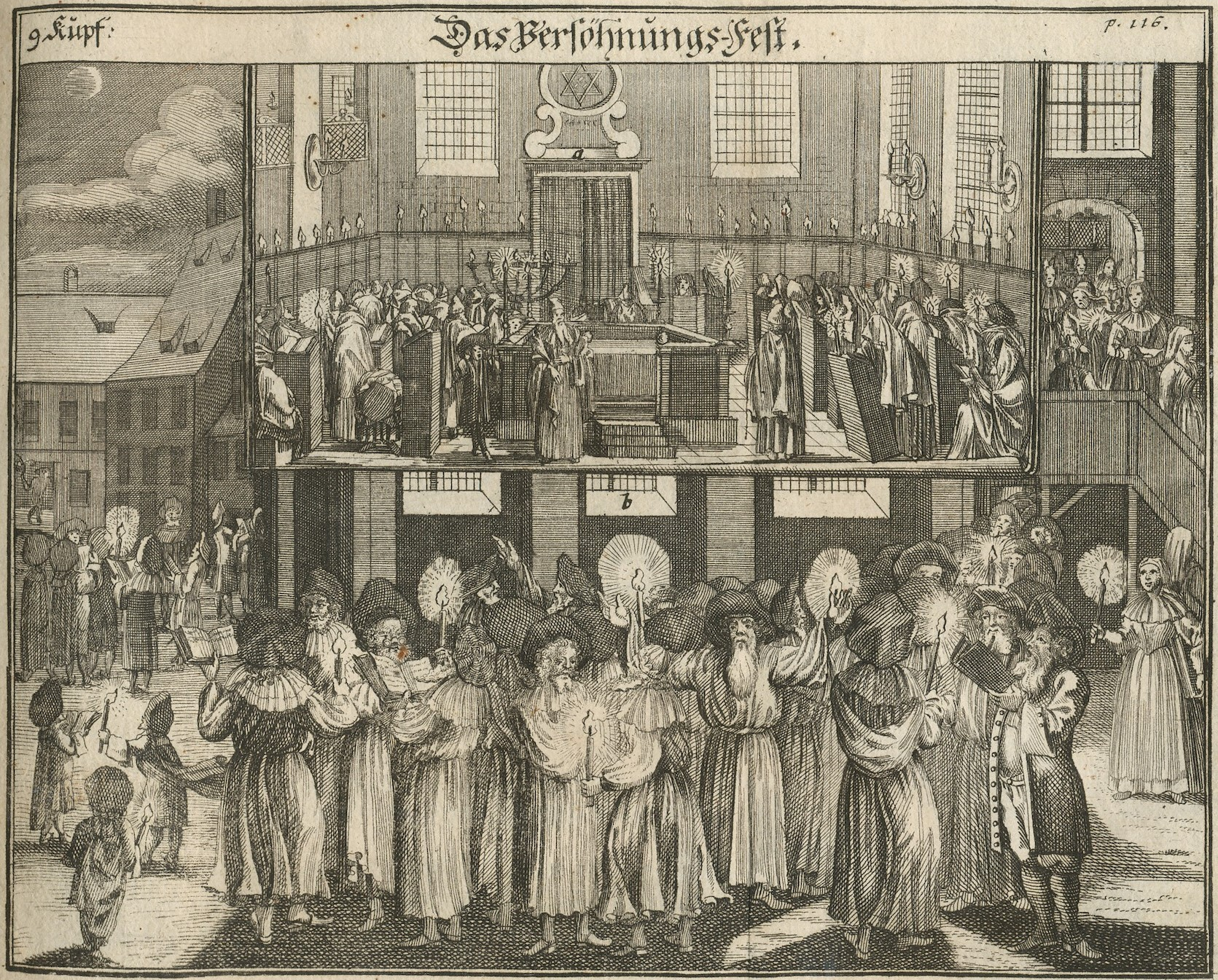
1720, following Yom Kippur

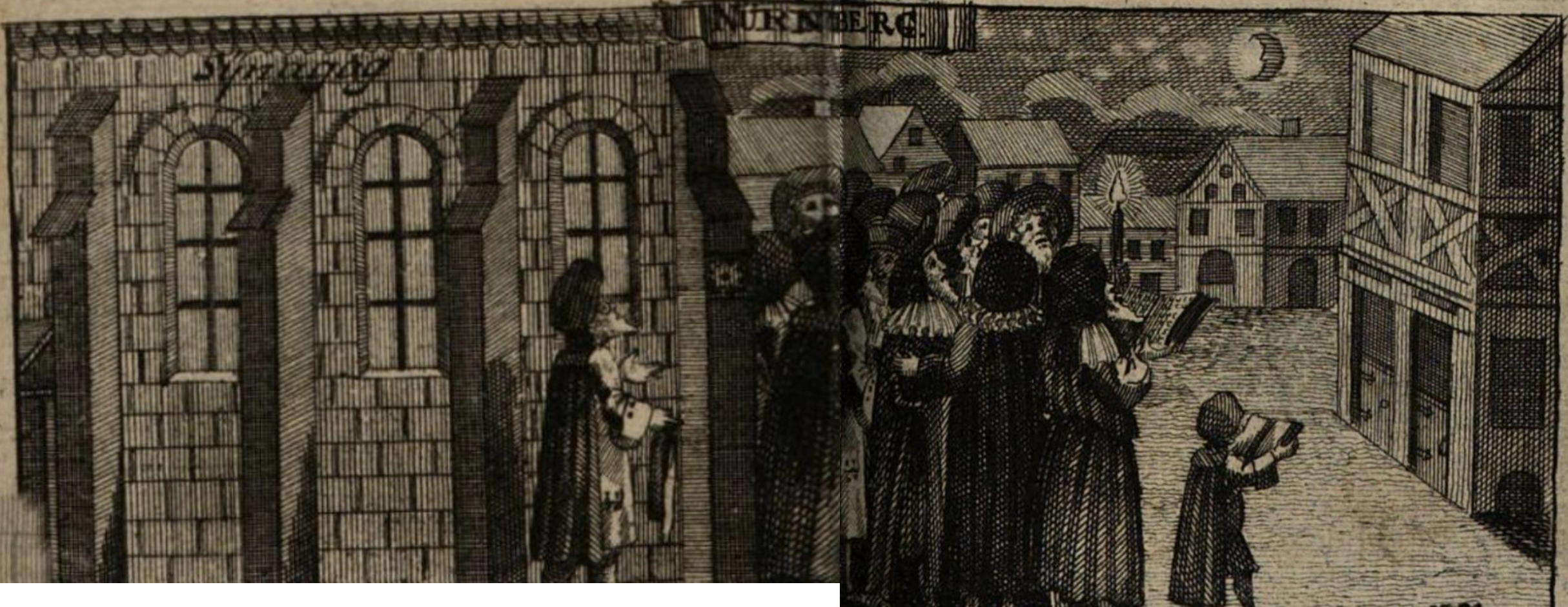
c. 1731 (Nuremberg) (Note: Compare the engraving of a wedding in Jüdische Ceremonien (1720), plate 22. Retrieved April 24, 2025 – via Flickr. In the 1734 edition, this wedding engraving is signed "A. A.".)

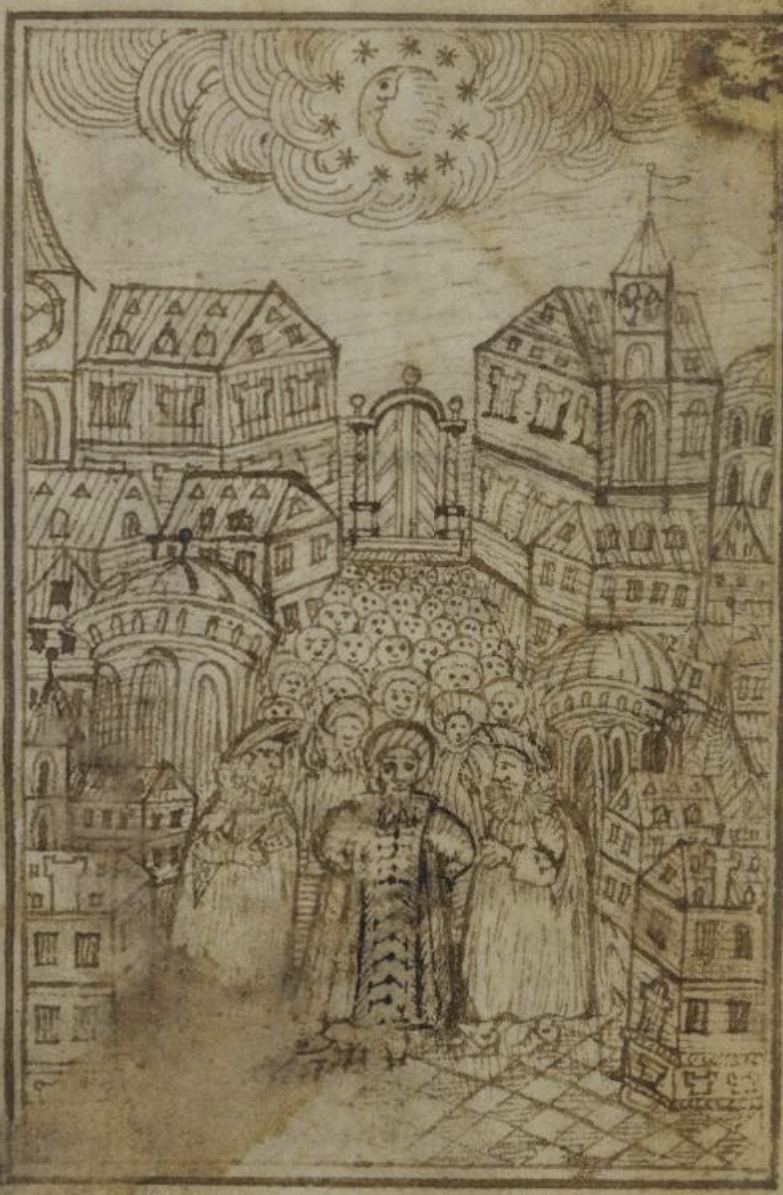
1738 sketch (Mainz) by Juspe ben Meir Schmalkalden, apparently after an engraving (Note: The same scribe is known from two other illuminated books, MSS Library of Congress 229, dated 1745, and Israel Museum B84.0907, undated. Neither contains Kiddush levana, perhaps because they were intended for women. See Brener, Ann (November 13, 2020). "Portrait of the Artist as Rain(bow) Maker: Joseph ben Meir Schmalkalden". 4 Corners of the World: International Collections at the Library of Congress. Retrieved 3-23-2025. Republished with additional content in Ibid. (2024). "Portrait of the Artist as Rain(bow) Maker: A Miniature Prayerbook from Germany". Books Like Sapphires: From the Library of Congress Judaica Collection. Brandeis University Press. pp. 166–176.)

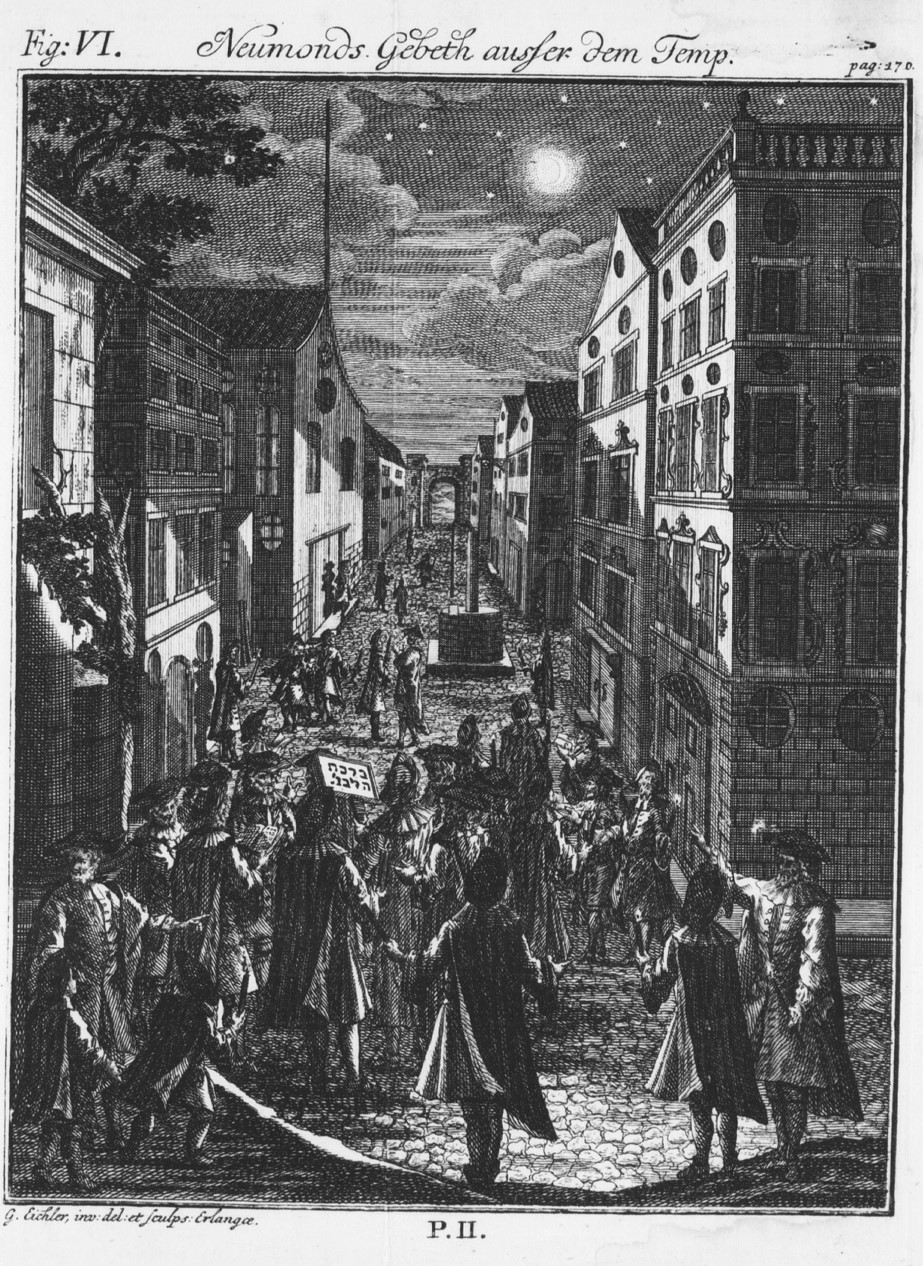
1748, by Gottfried Eichler

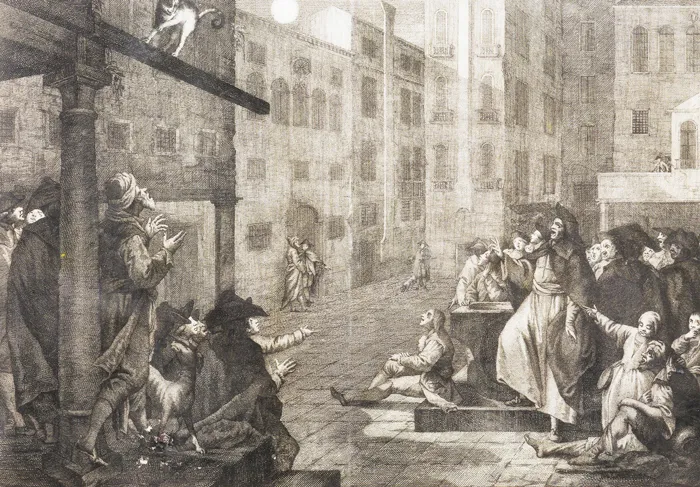
1786–1800 (Padua? Venice?), by Giovanni Maria de Pian

== Revival illuminations (1712–1800) ==
Many illuminations survive from the 18th century Jewish illuminated prayerbook revival, often adapted from earlier woodcuts. Some 18th-century illuminations show a group of ten men, an exact minyan.

=== Gallery ===
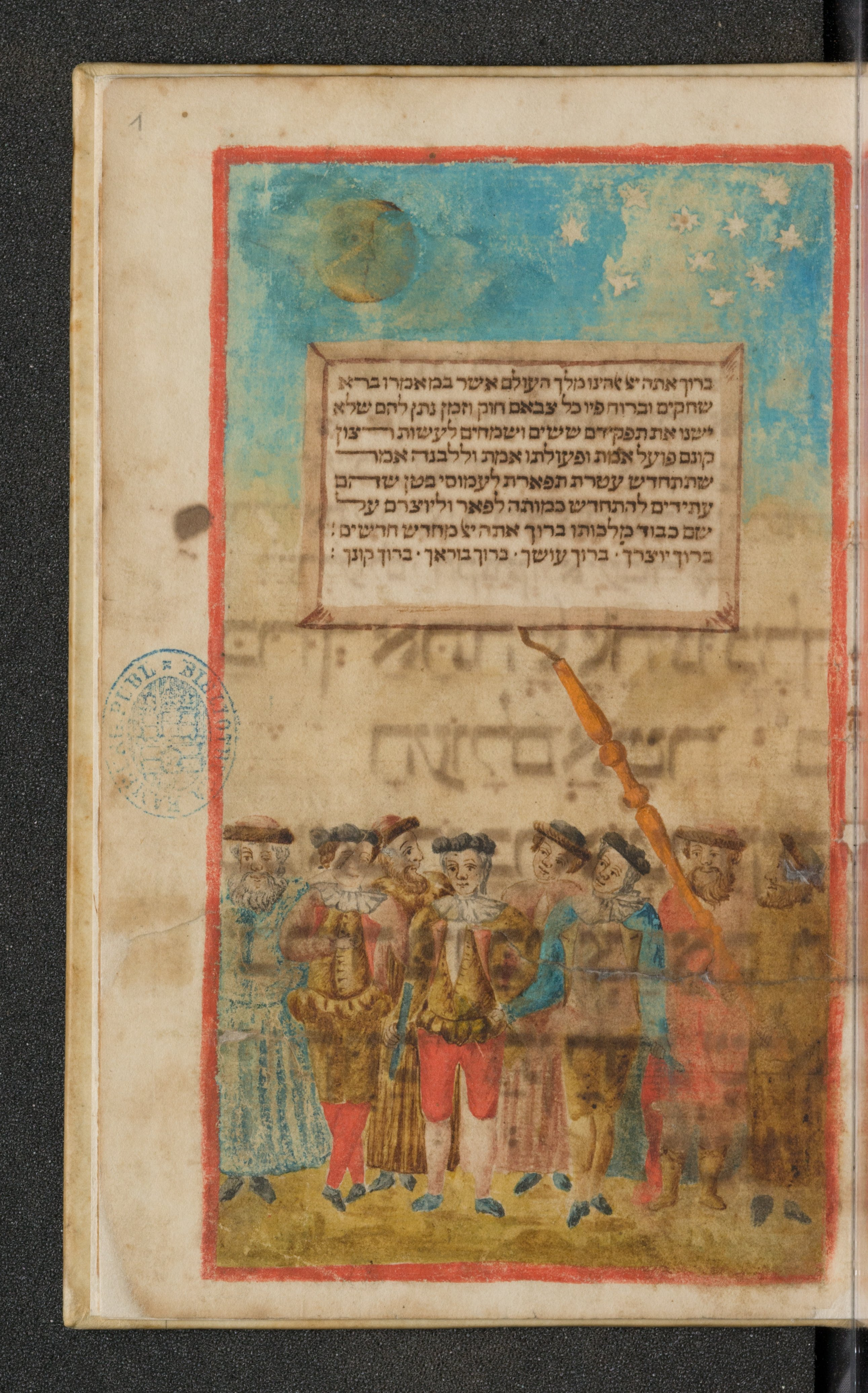
18th-century

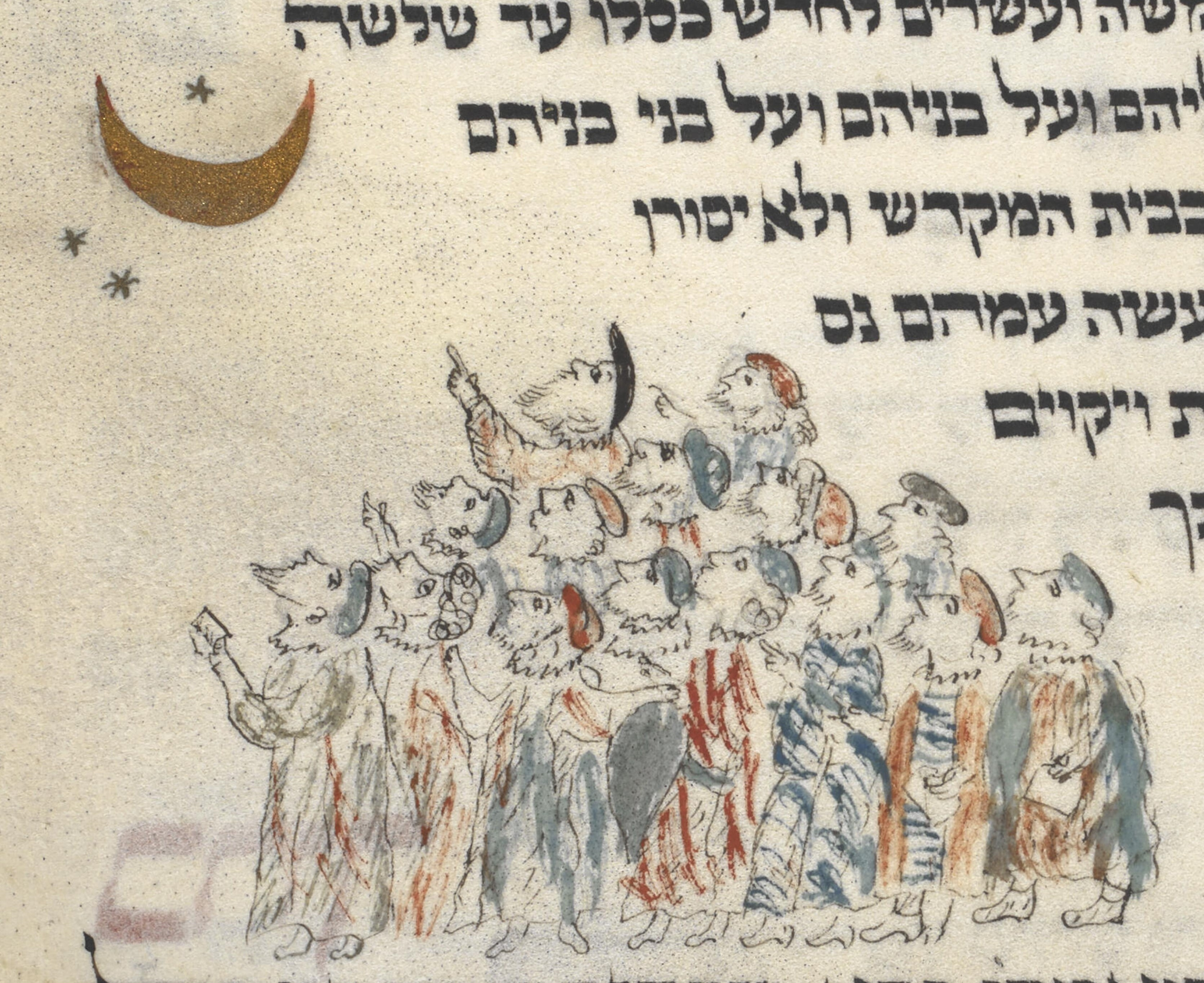
1714, by Aaron ben Moses of Novardok

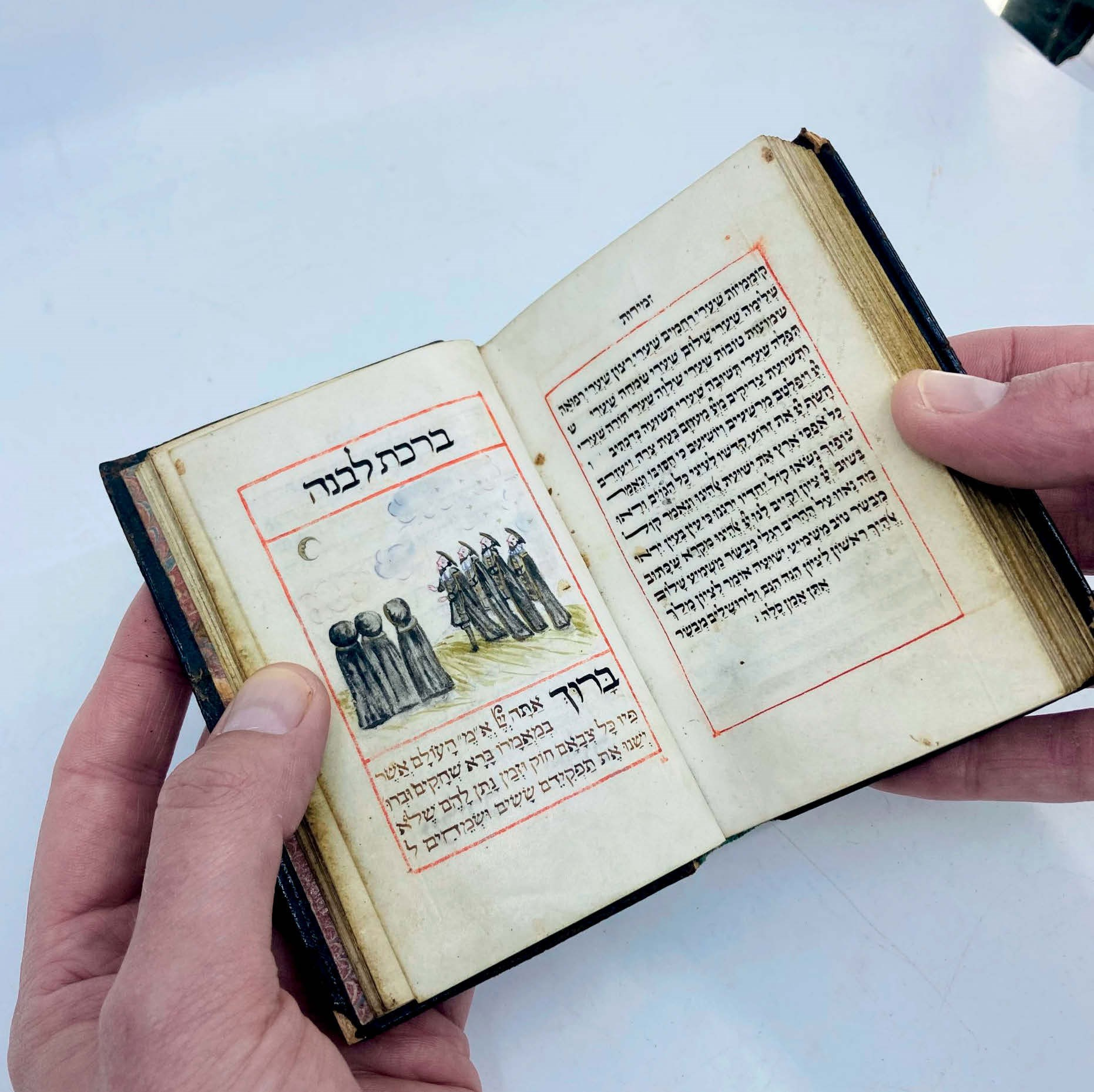
1717 (Amsterdam)

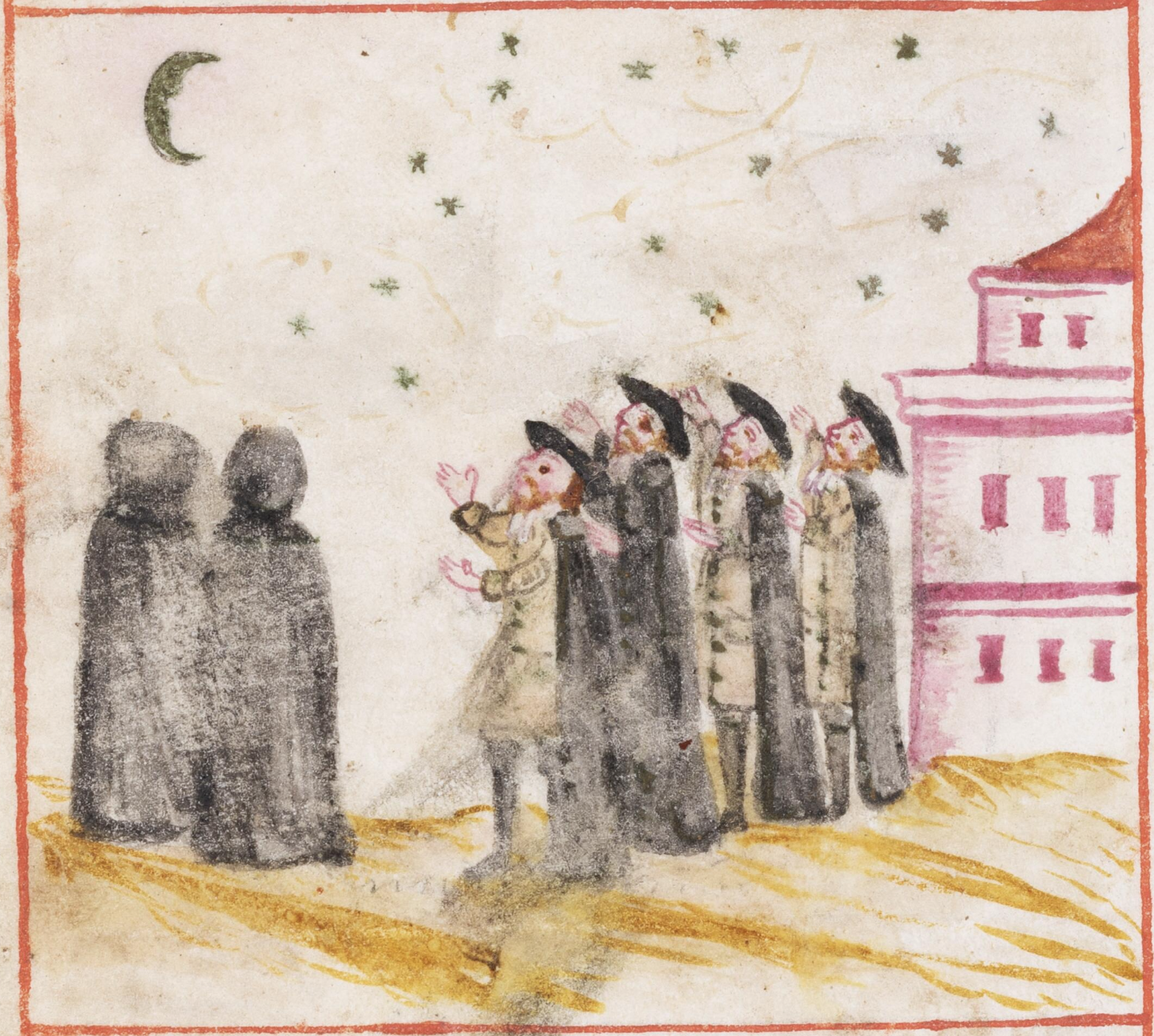
1717 (Germany)

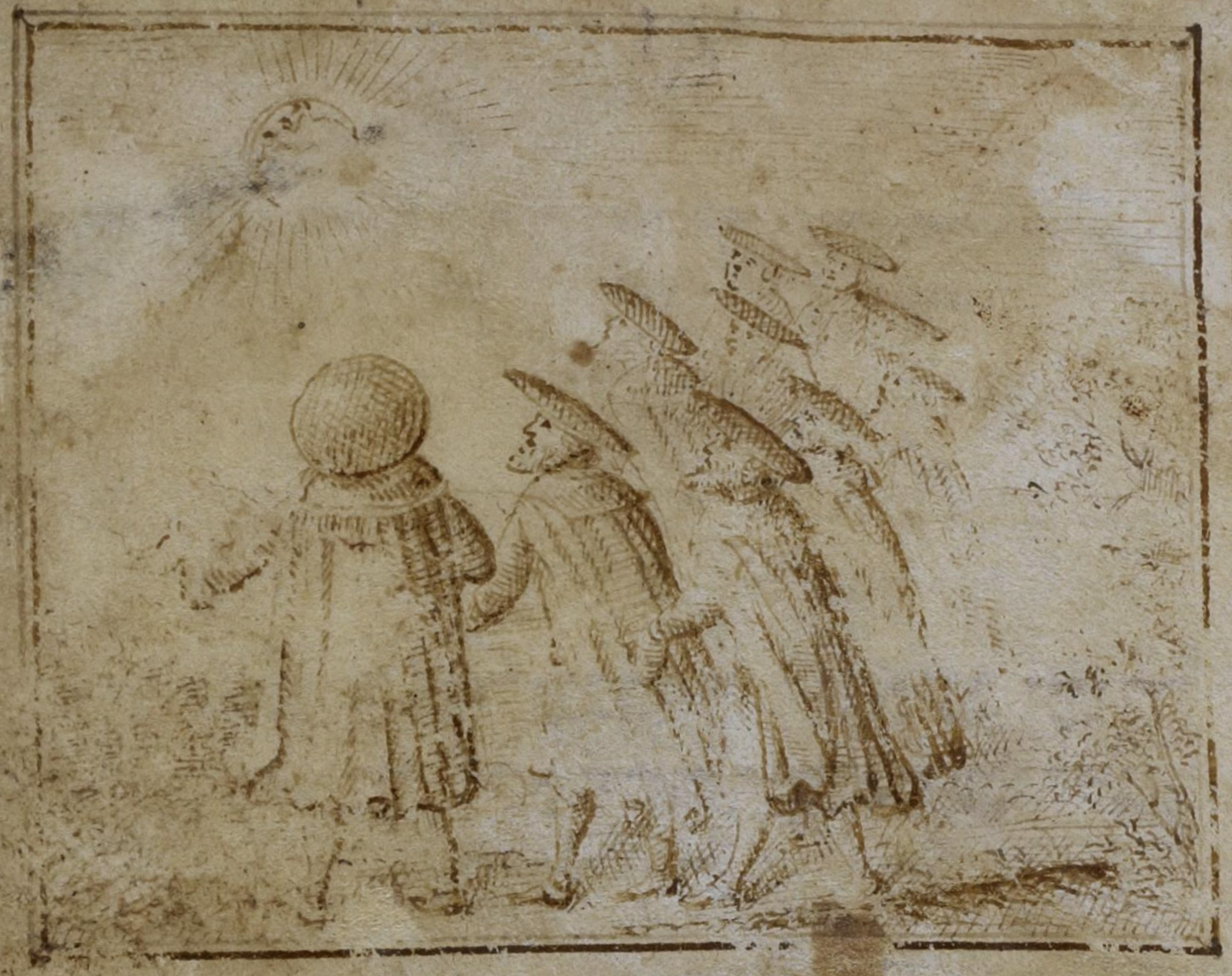
1719 (Prague? Vienna?), by Meshullam ben Moshe, "Zimmel of Polin"

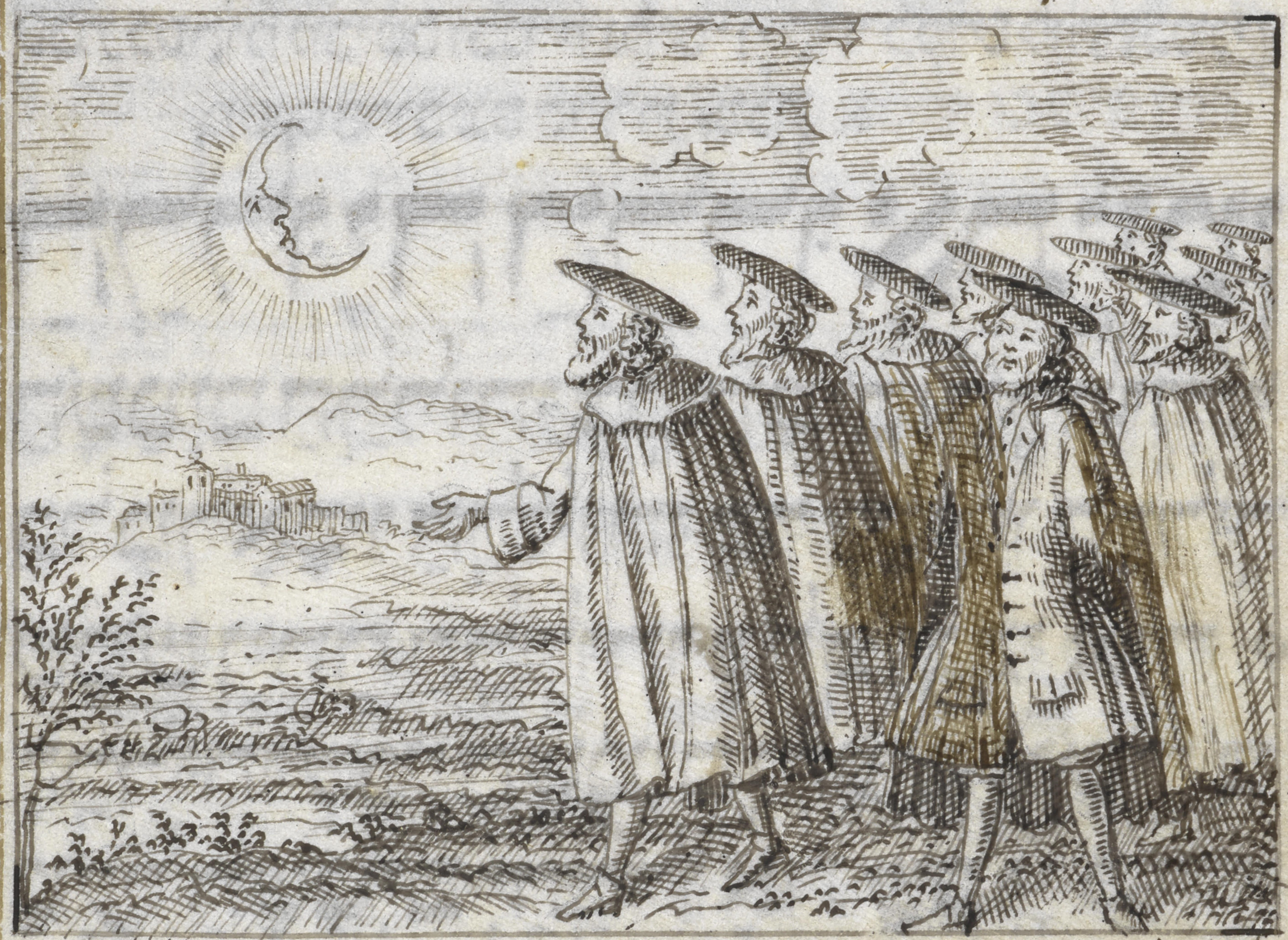
Early 18th-century, by Zimmel of Polin?

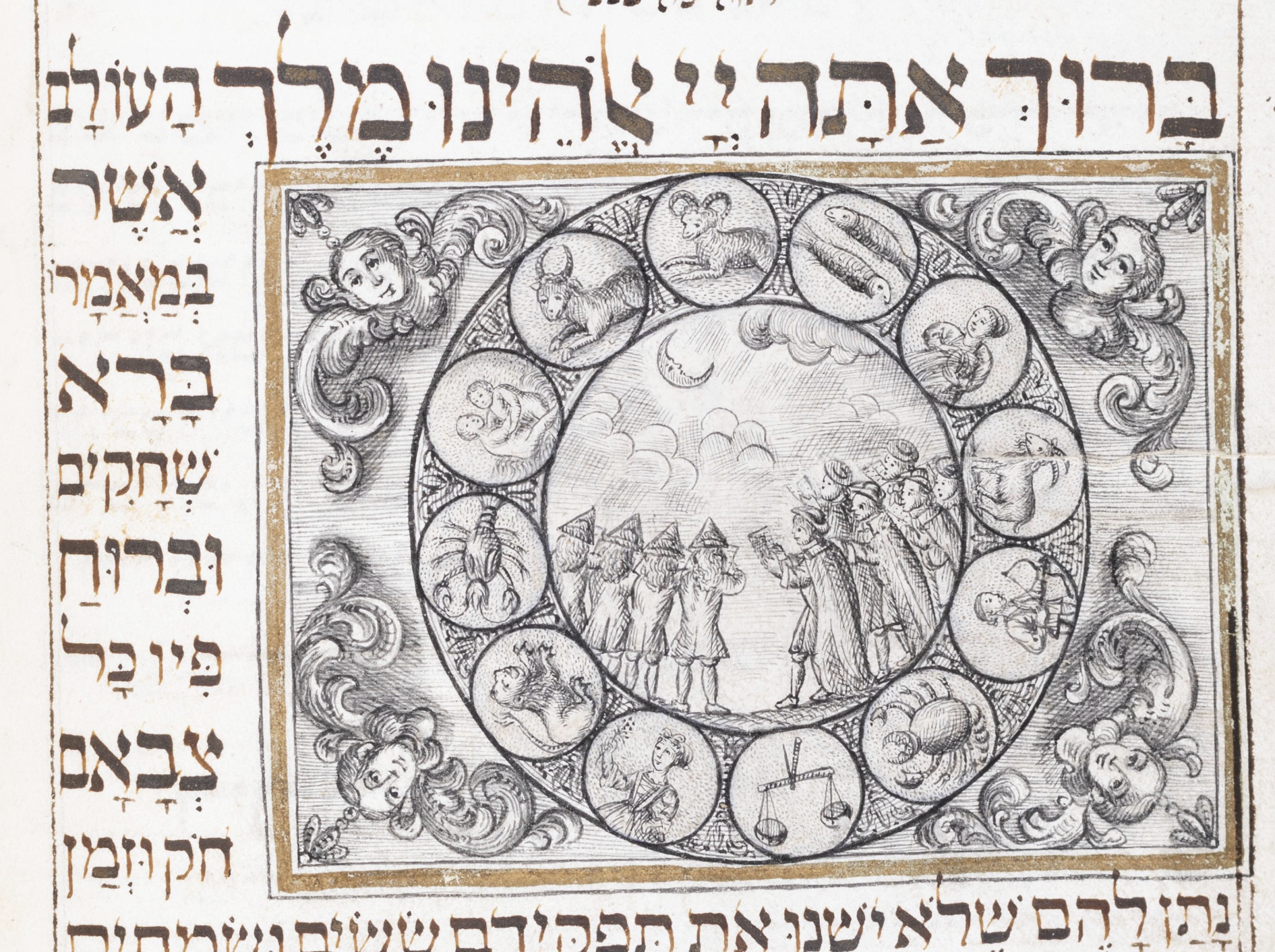
18th-century, with zodiac (Note: "By its very nature, the Blessing of the Moon was a subject that invited zodiac illustration . . . In this manuscript, a product of German-Jewish culture, the illustrator did not avoid drawing the human form, and he may have copied the zodiac signs from a printed German mahzor". Fishof, Iris (ed.) (2001). Written in the Stars. p. 72. See also broadsheet above and Hachlili, Rachel (2013). Ancient Synagogues – Archaeology and Art. Brill. pp. 382–385.)

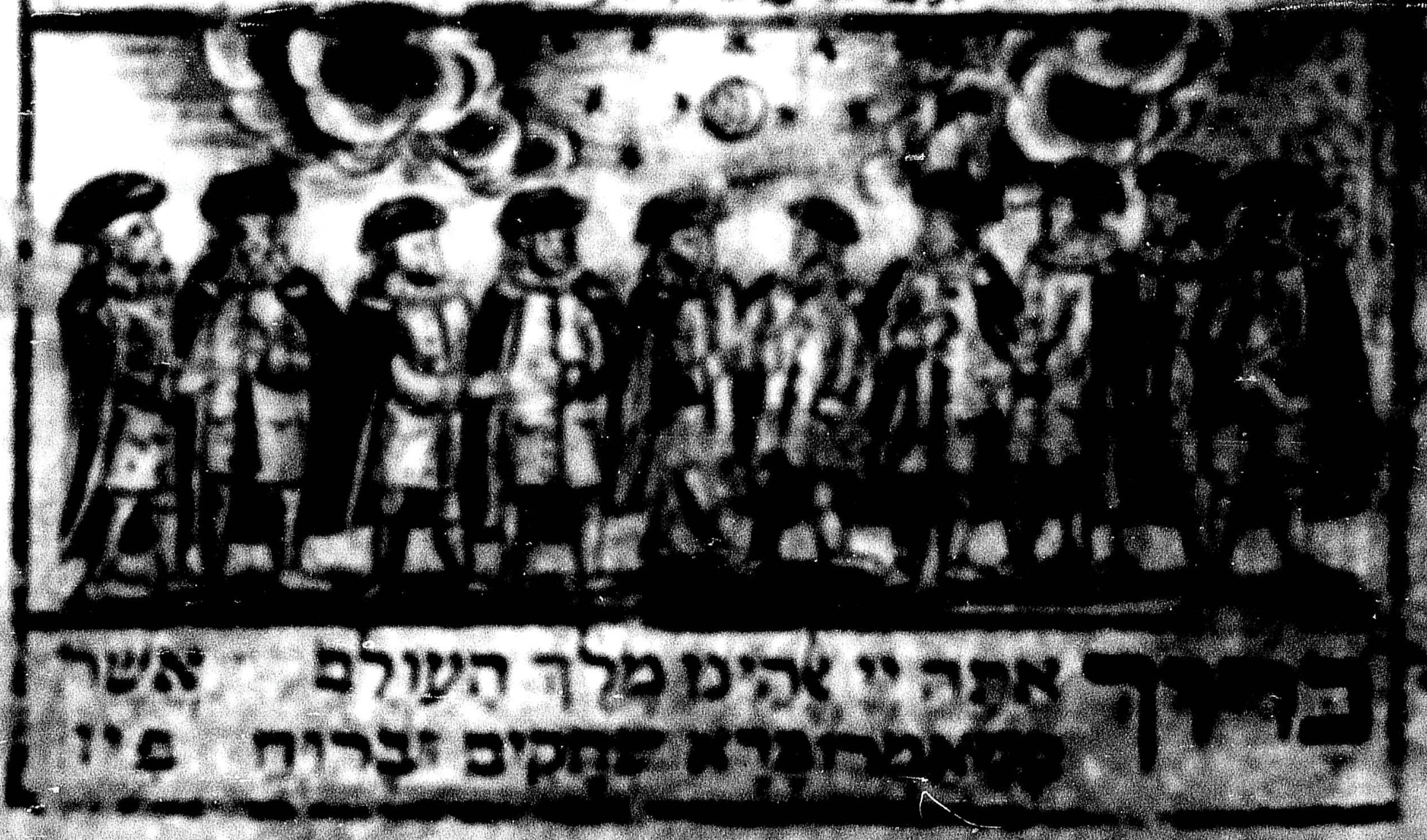
1722

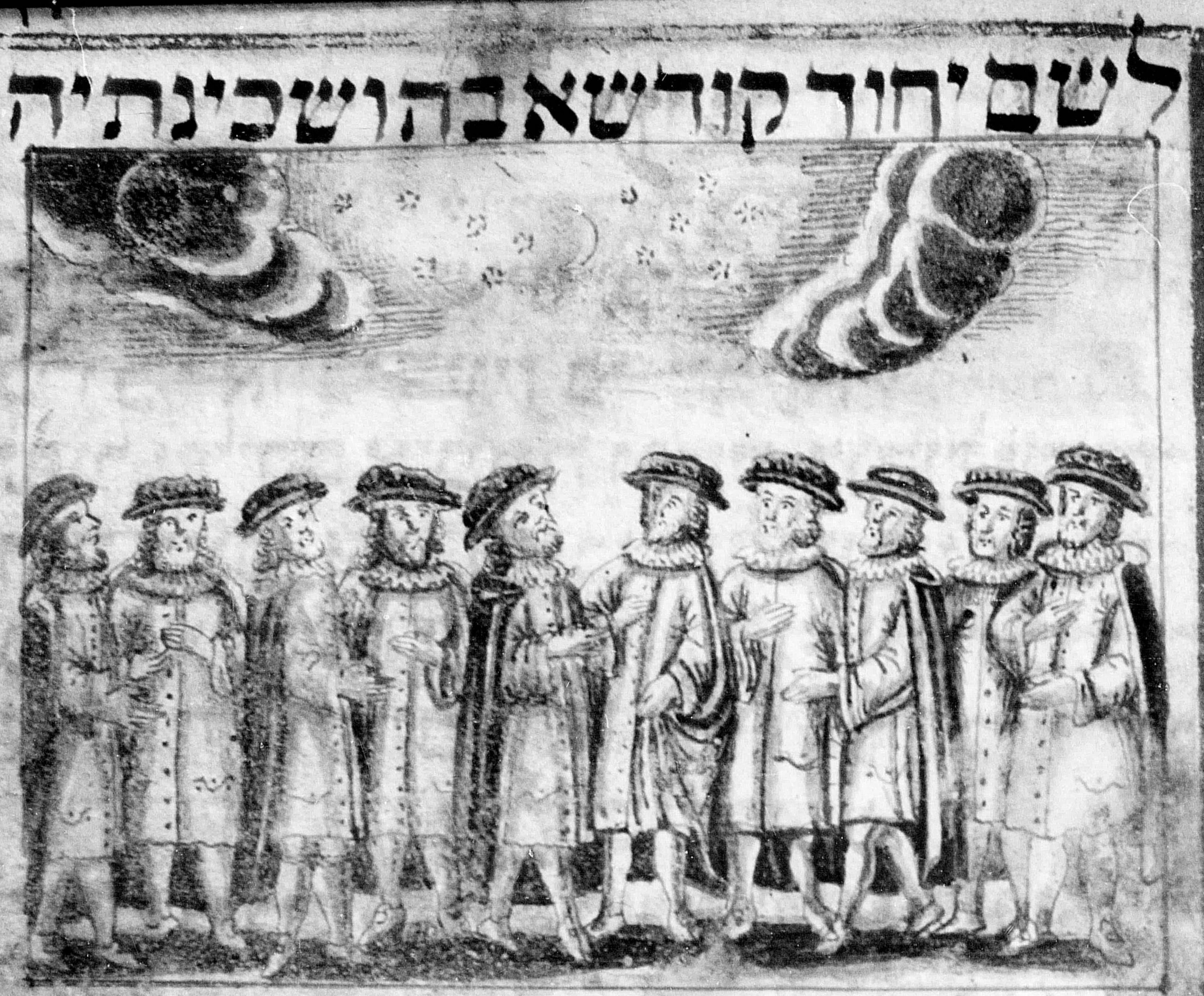
1722 (Moravia), by Nathan ben Samson [of Mezhyrich]

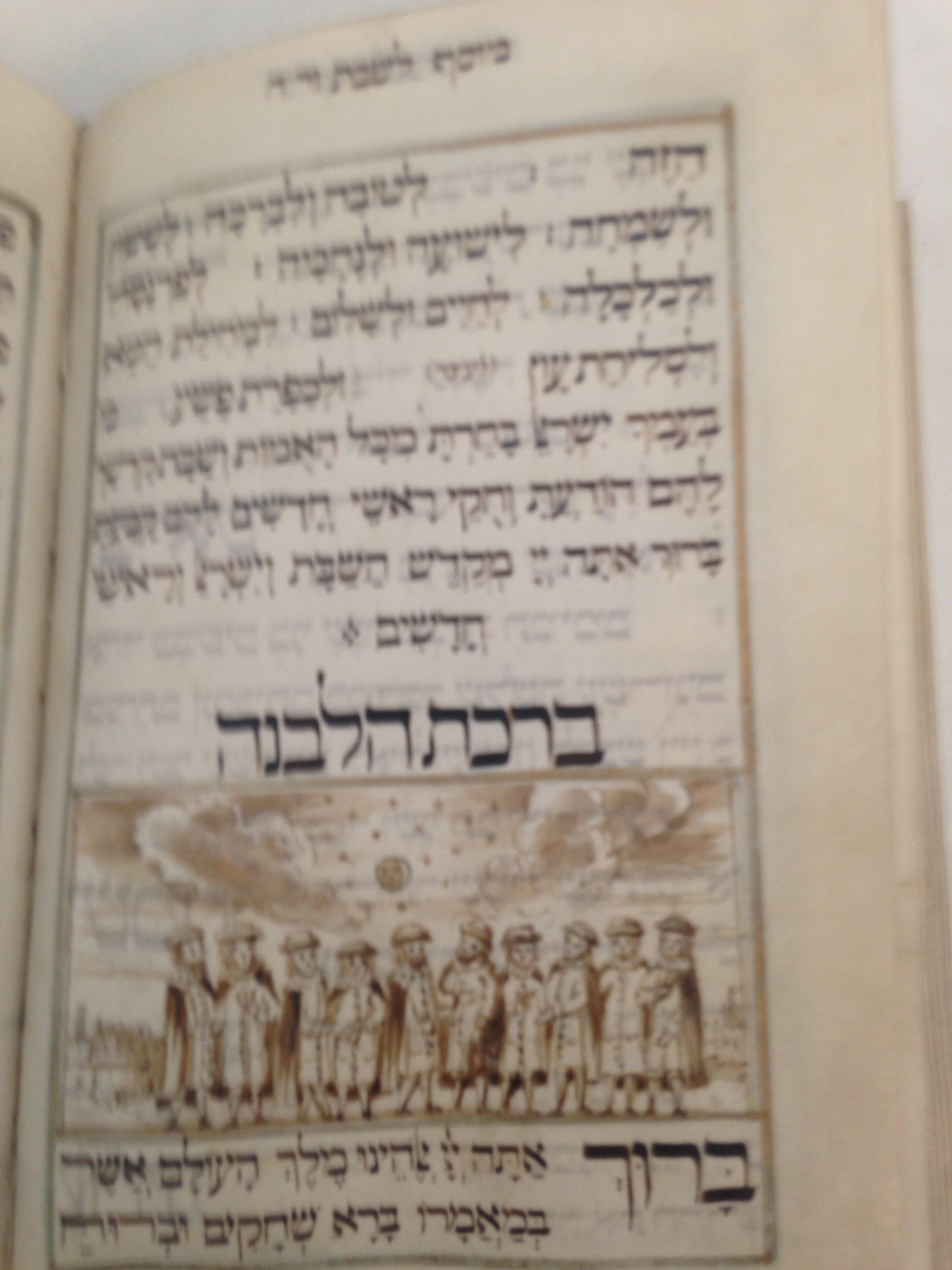
1723, by Moses Leib ben Wolf of Trebitsch

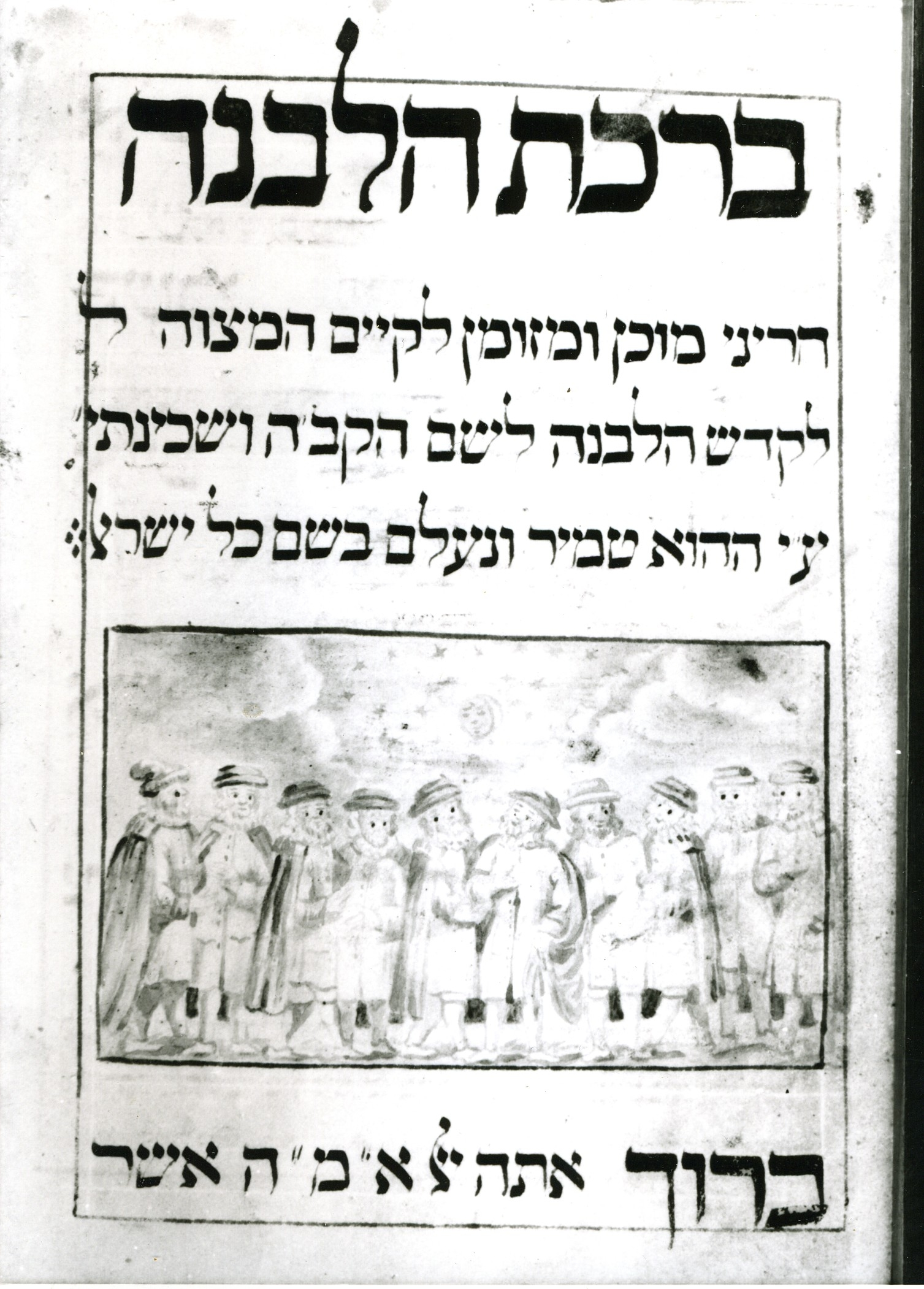
Undated, by Moses Leib ben Wolf of Trebitsch

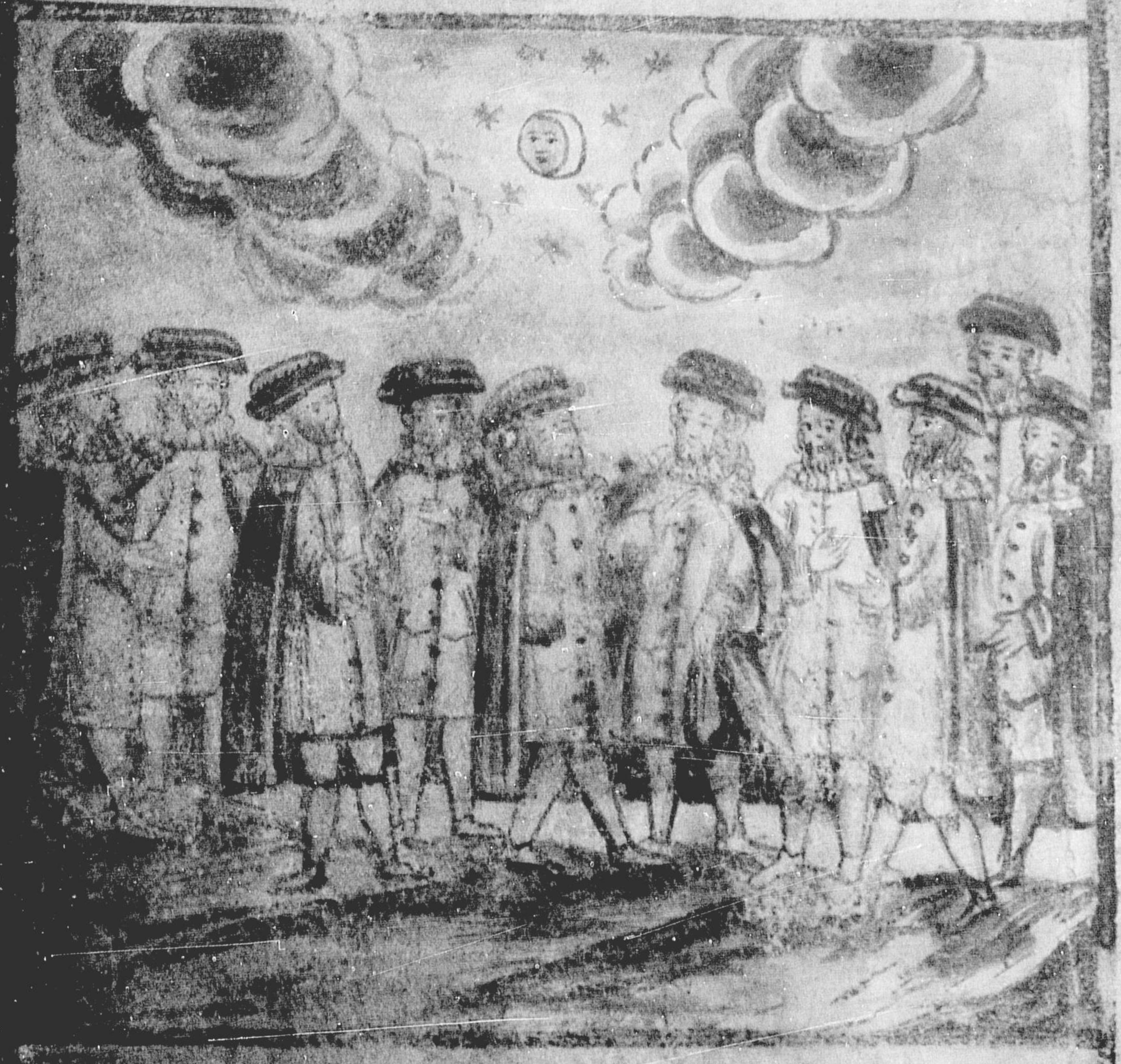
1723 (Amsterdam? Vienna?)

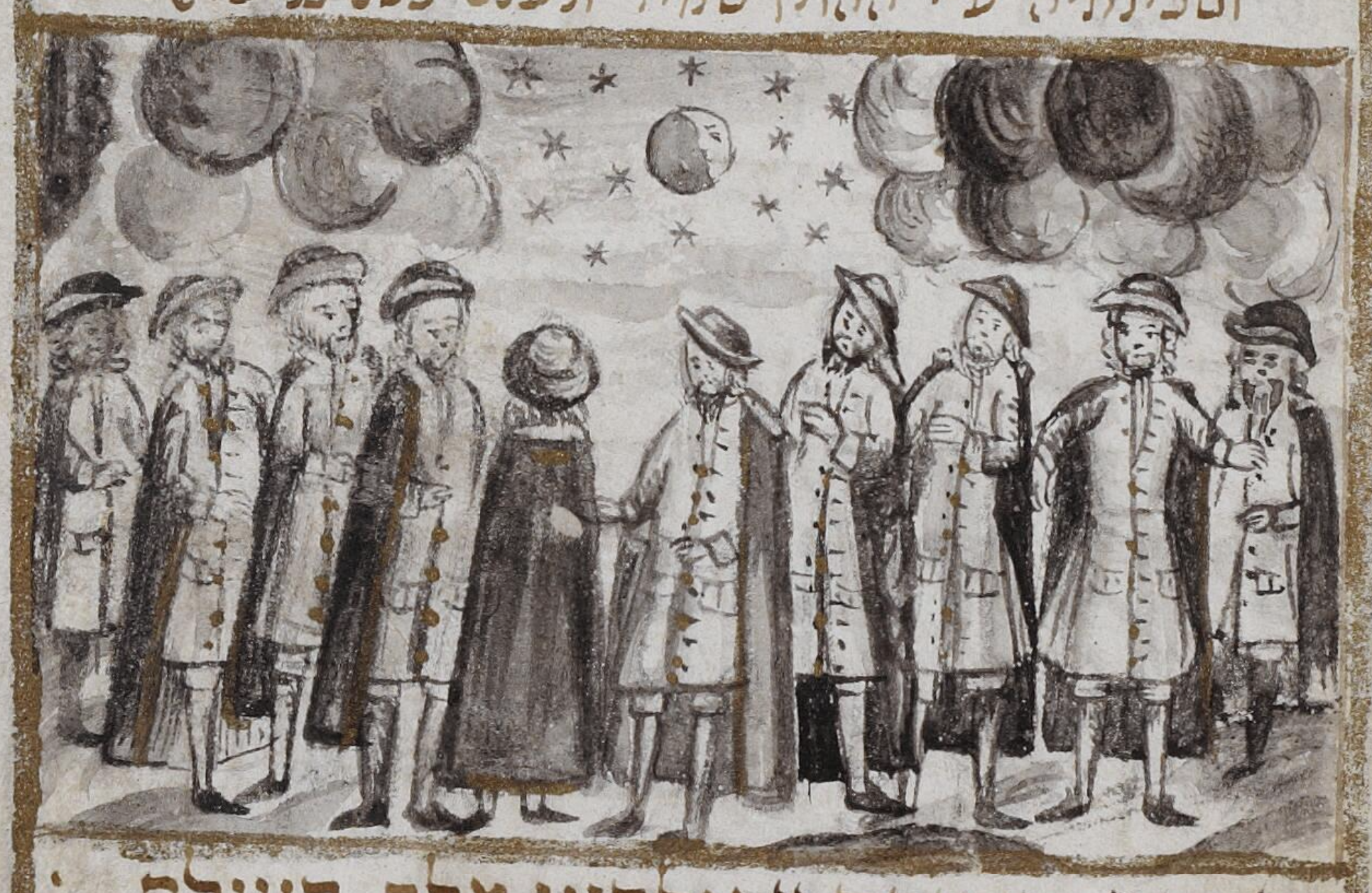
1724 (Vienna), by Samuel Dreznitz? Zimmel of Polin?

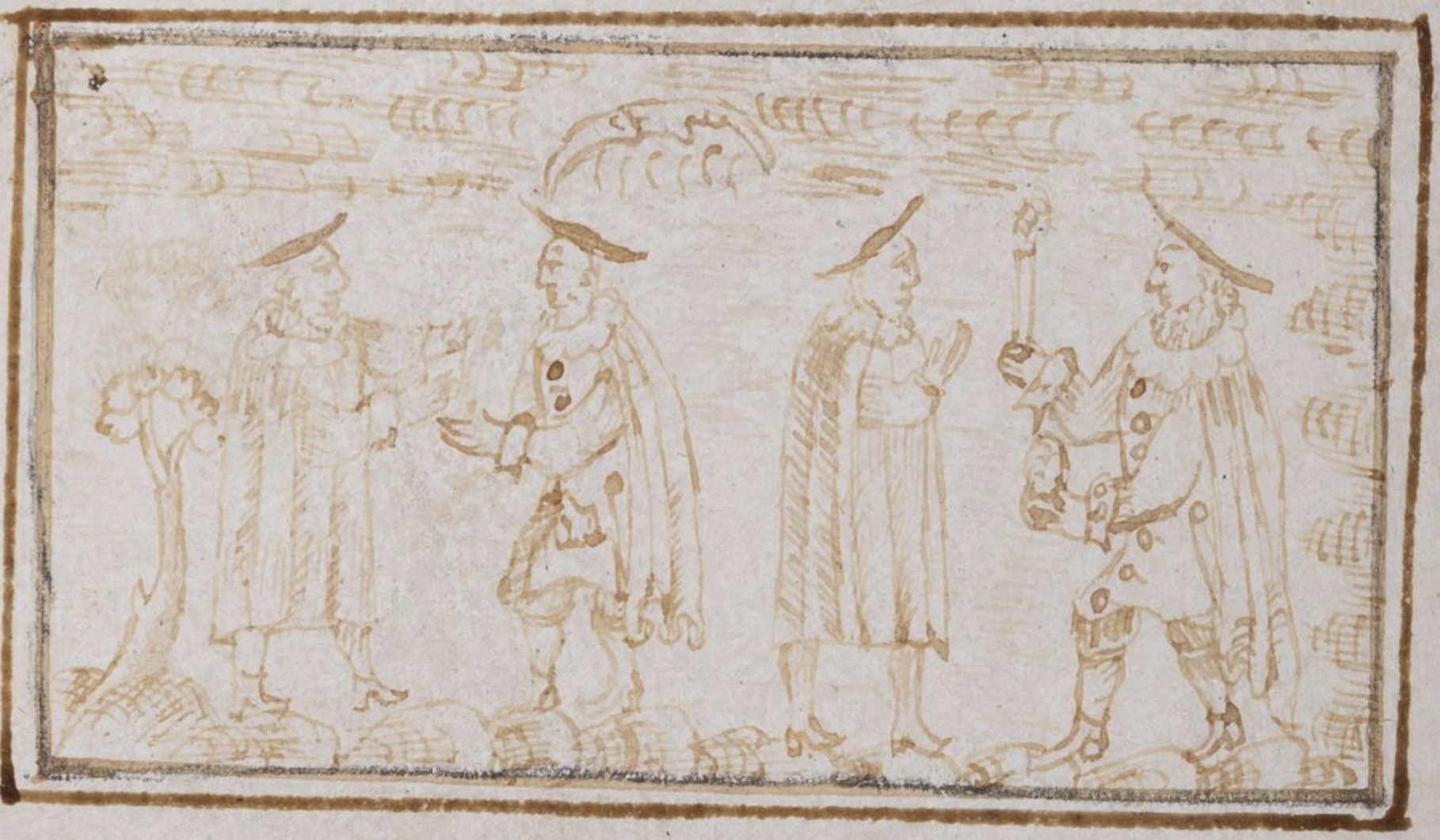
18th-century (Moravia), by Nathan ben Samson of Mezhyrich (incomplete)

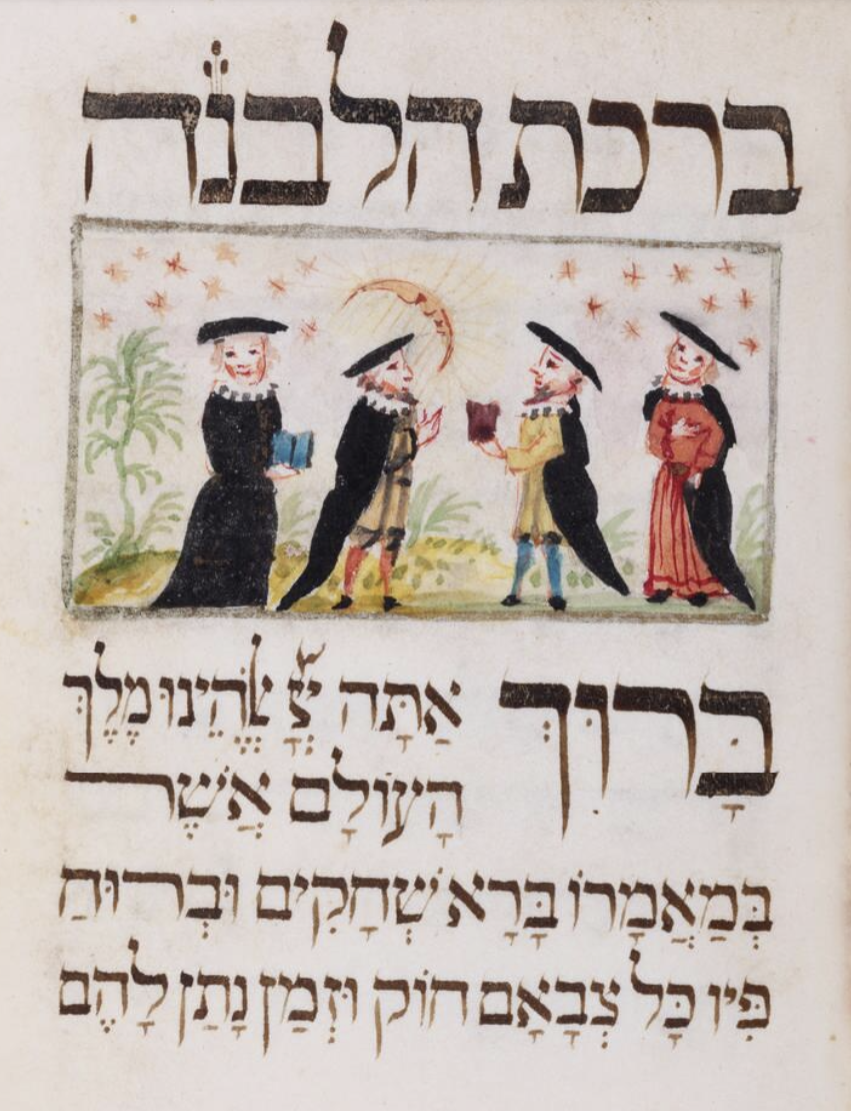
1727 (Moravia?), by Nathan ben Samson of Mezhyrich

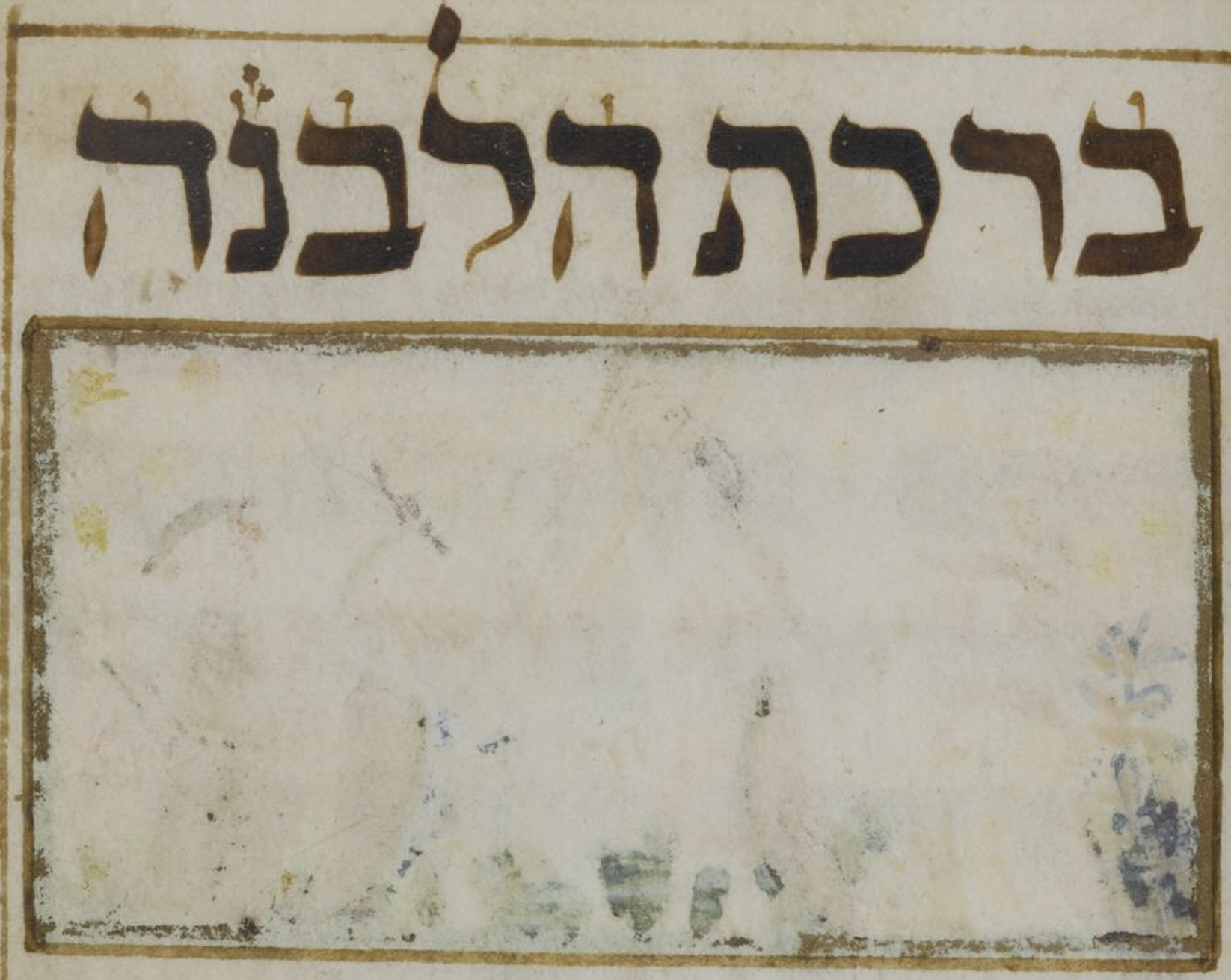
18th-century (damaged)

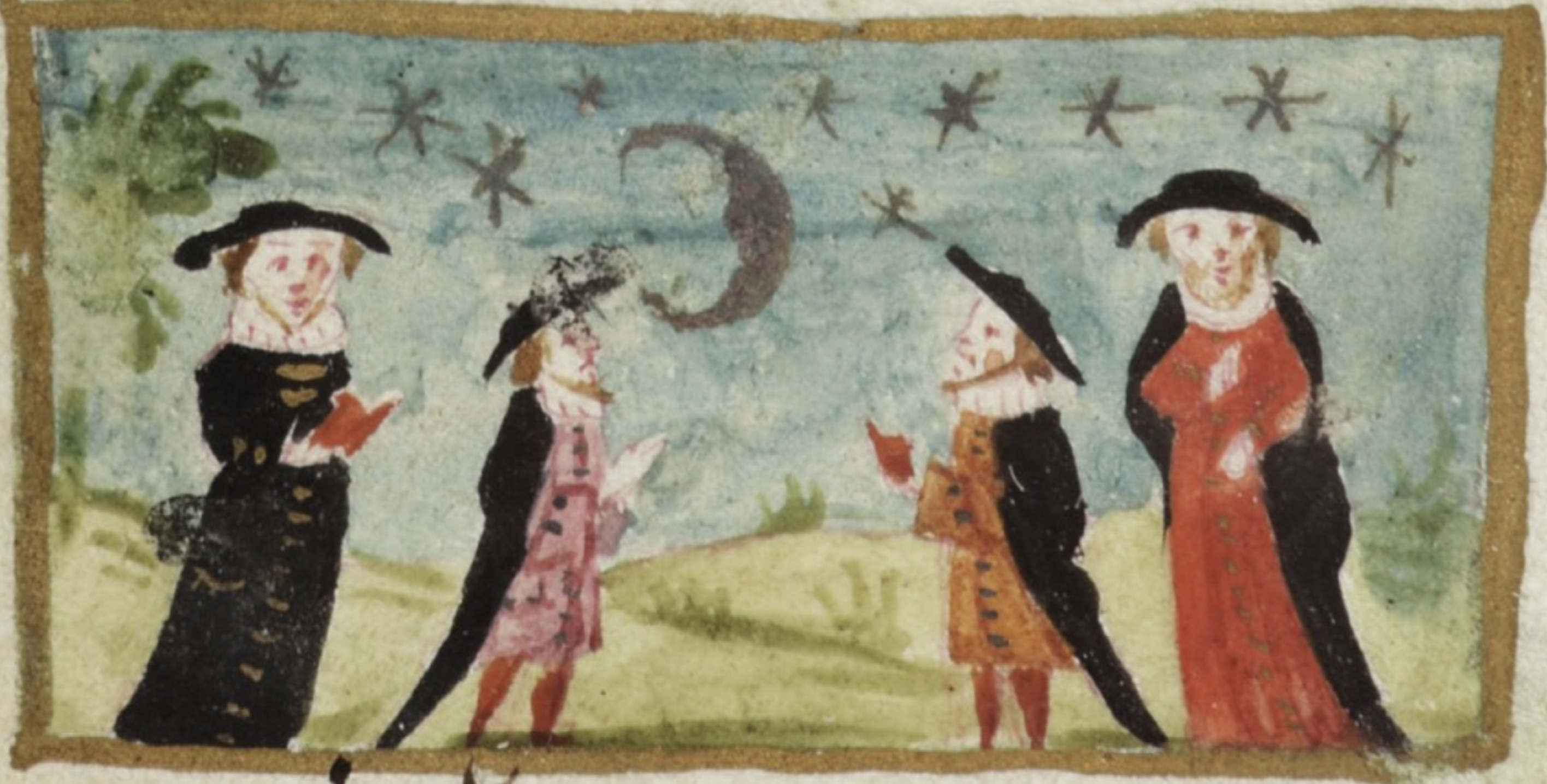
1728 (Moravia?), by Nathan ben Samson of Mezhyrich

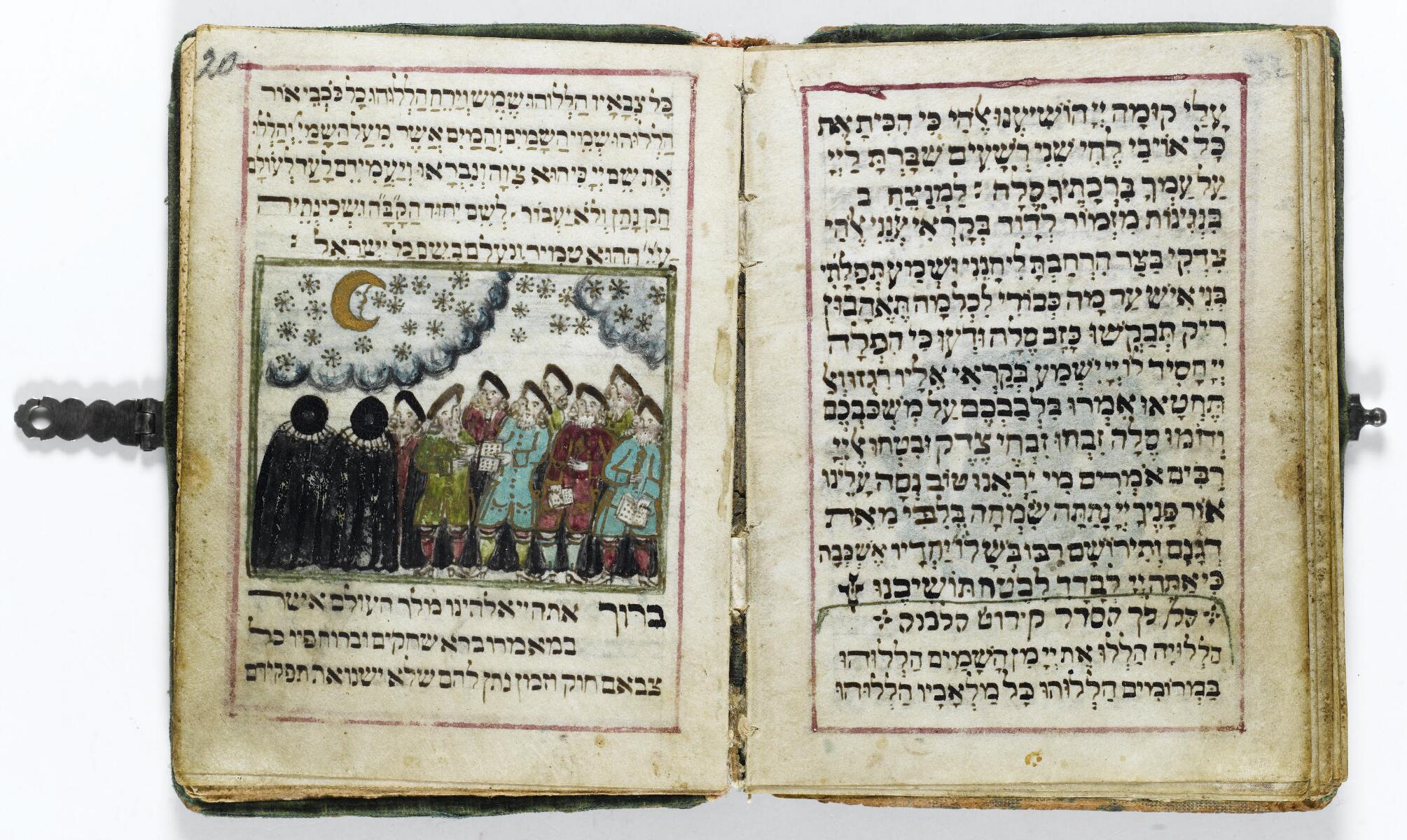
1728

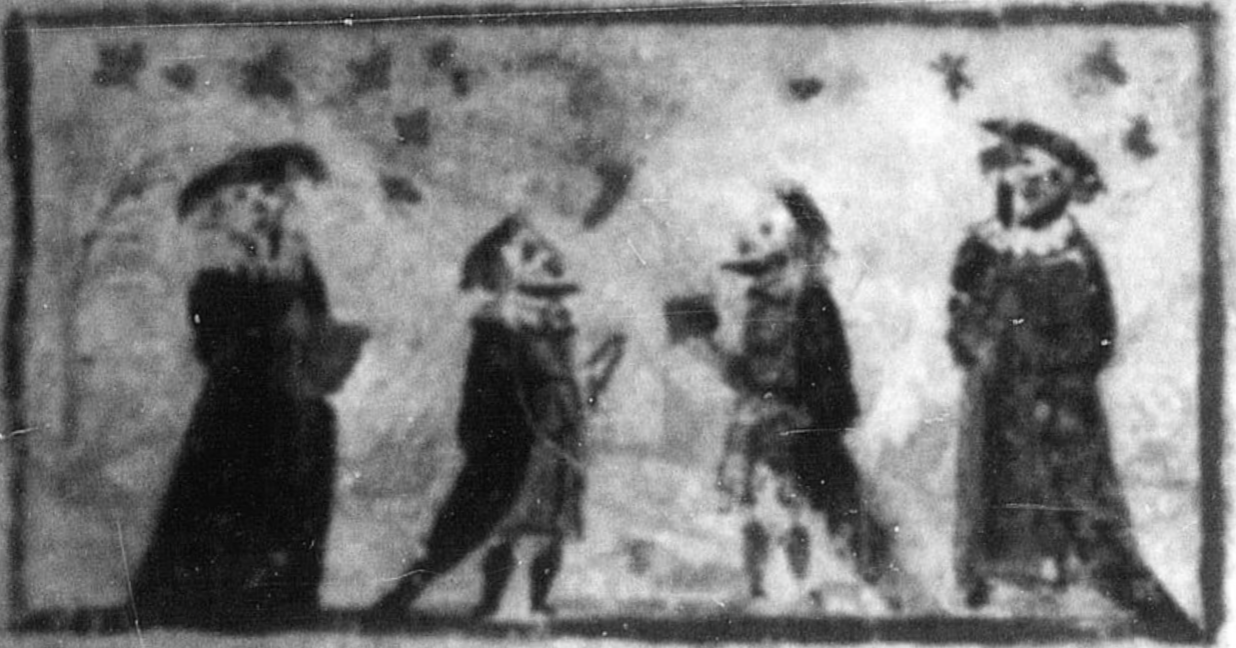
1729 (Moravia), by Nathan ben Samson of Mezhyrich

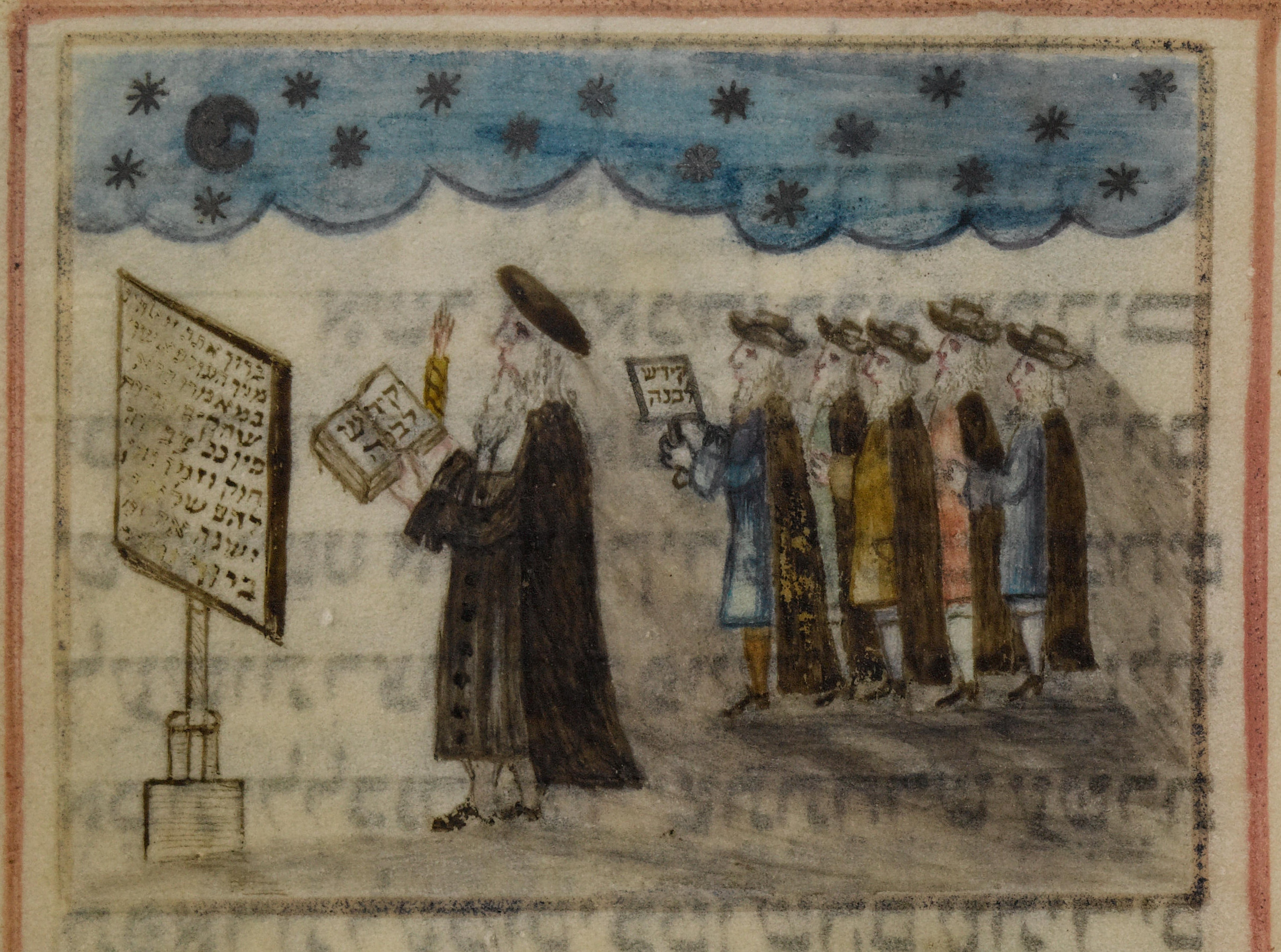
1736 (Netherlands?), by "Isaac" (Note: "A group of men is depicted outside the city saying the prayer for the New Moon. The image doubtlessly was taken from one of the many Minhagim booklets". Schrijver (1993). p. 97.)

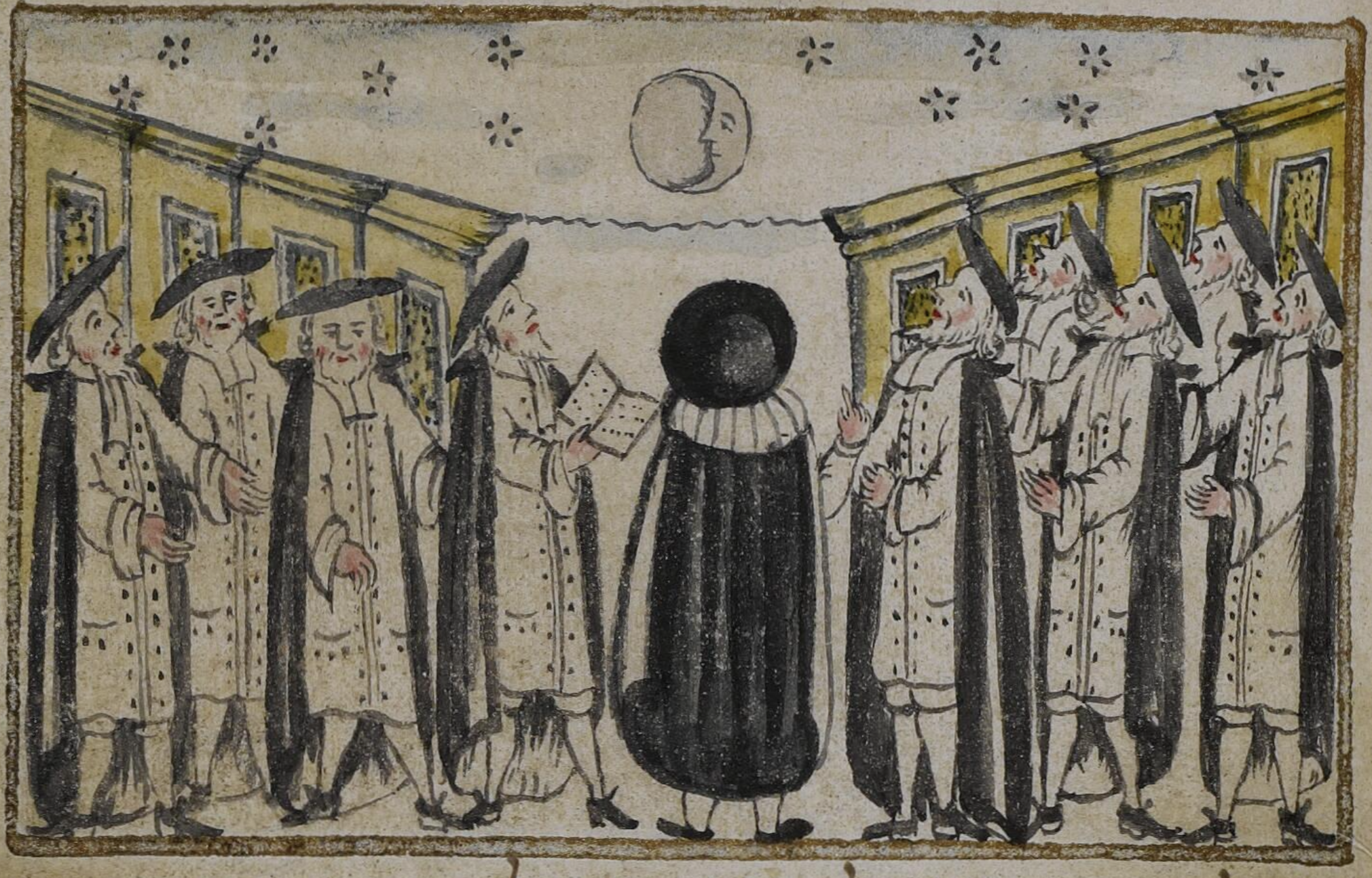
1736 (Mannheim), by Simha Pihem Segal.

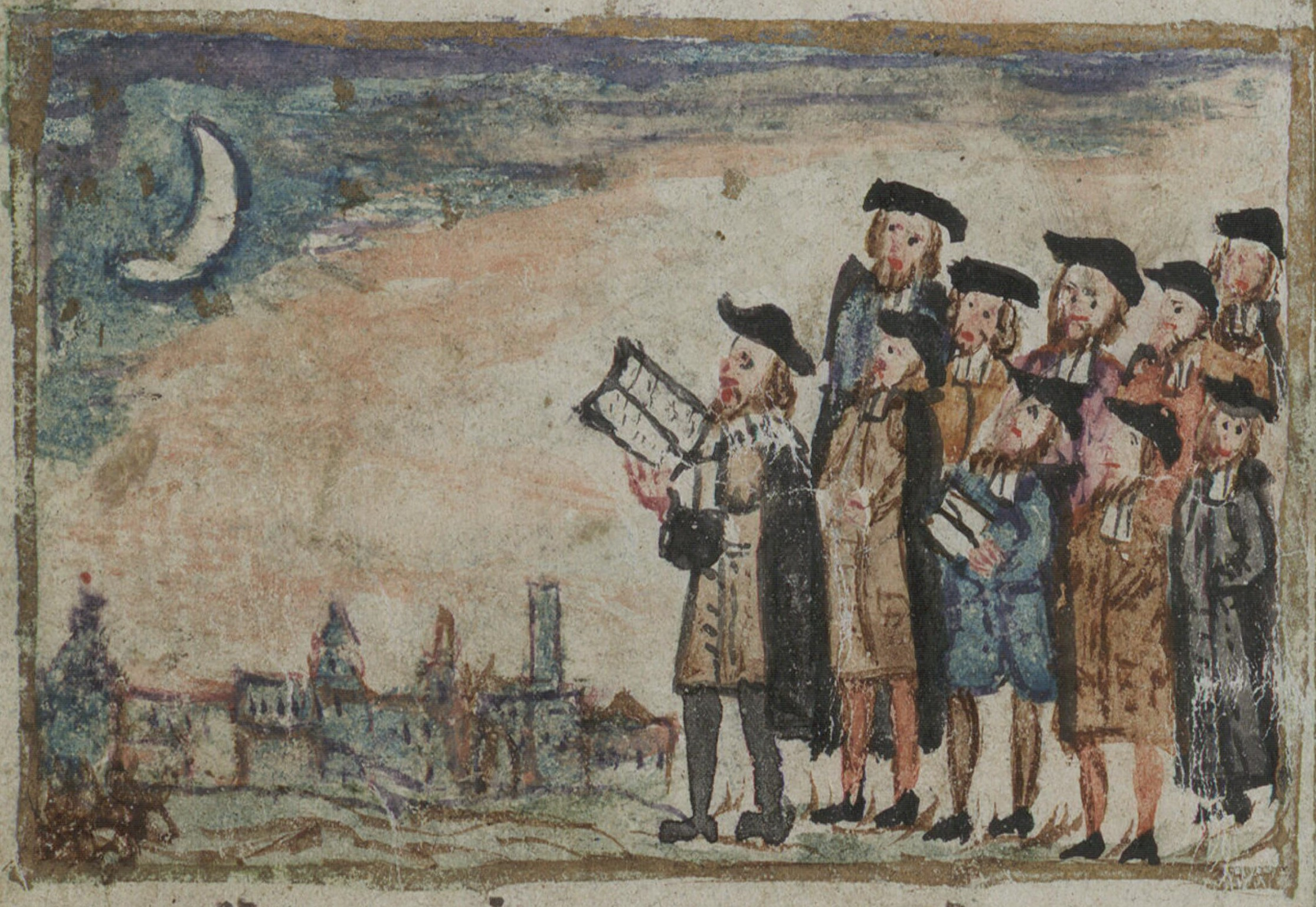
1737

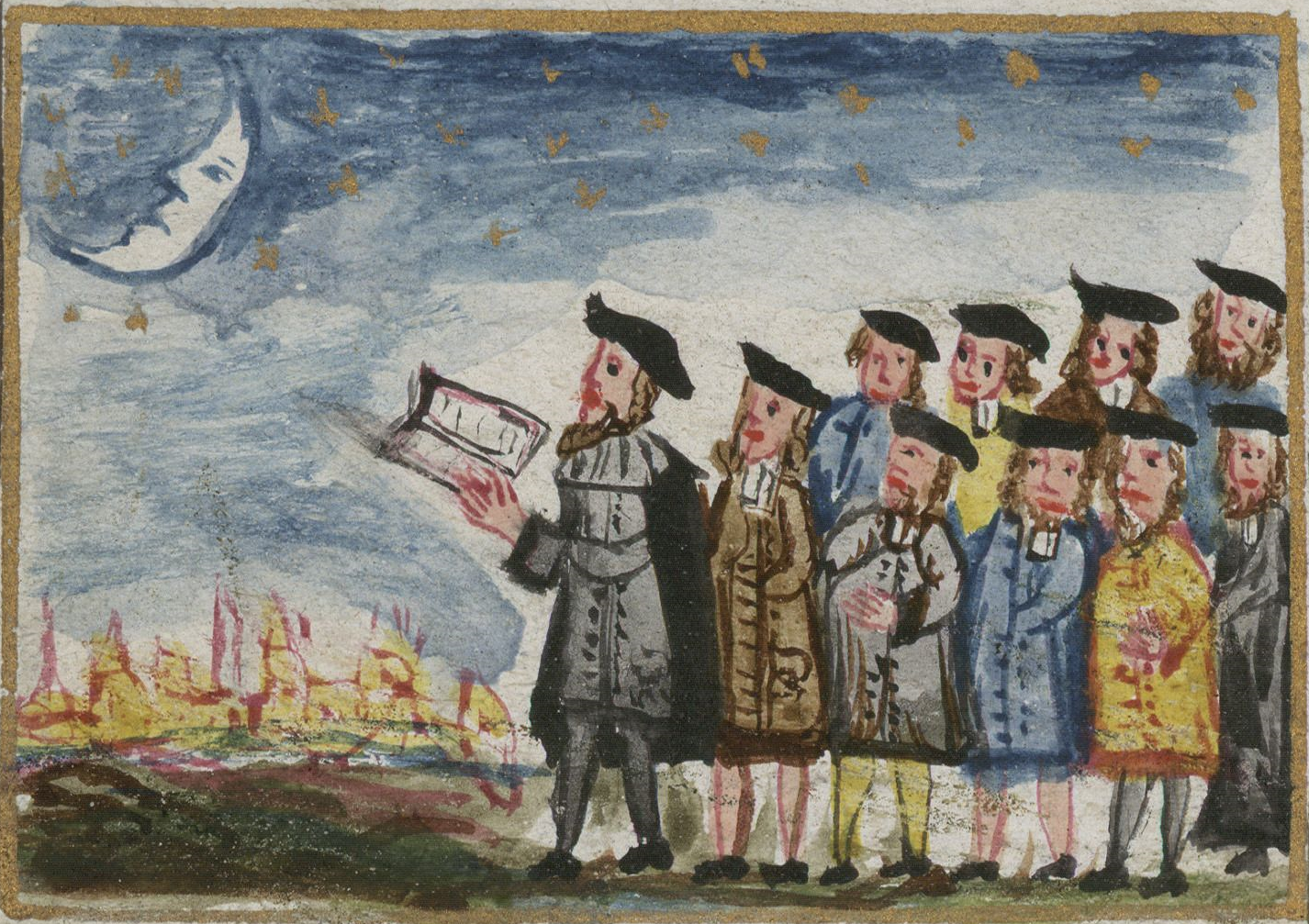
1738 (Fürth).

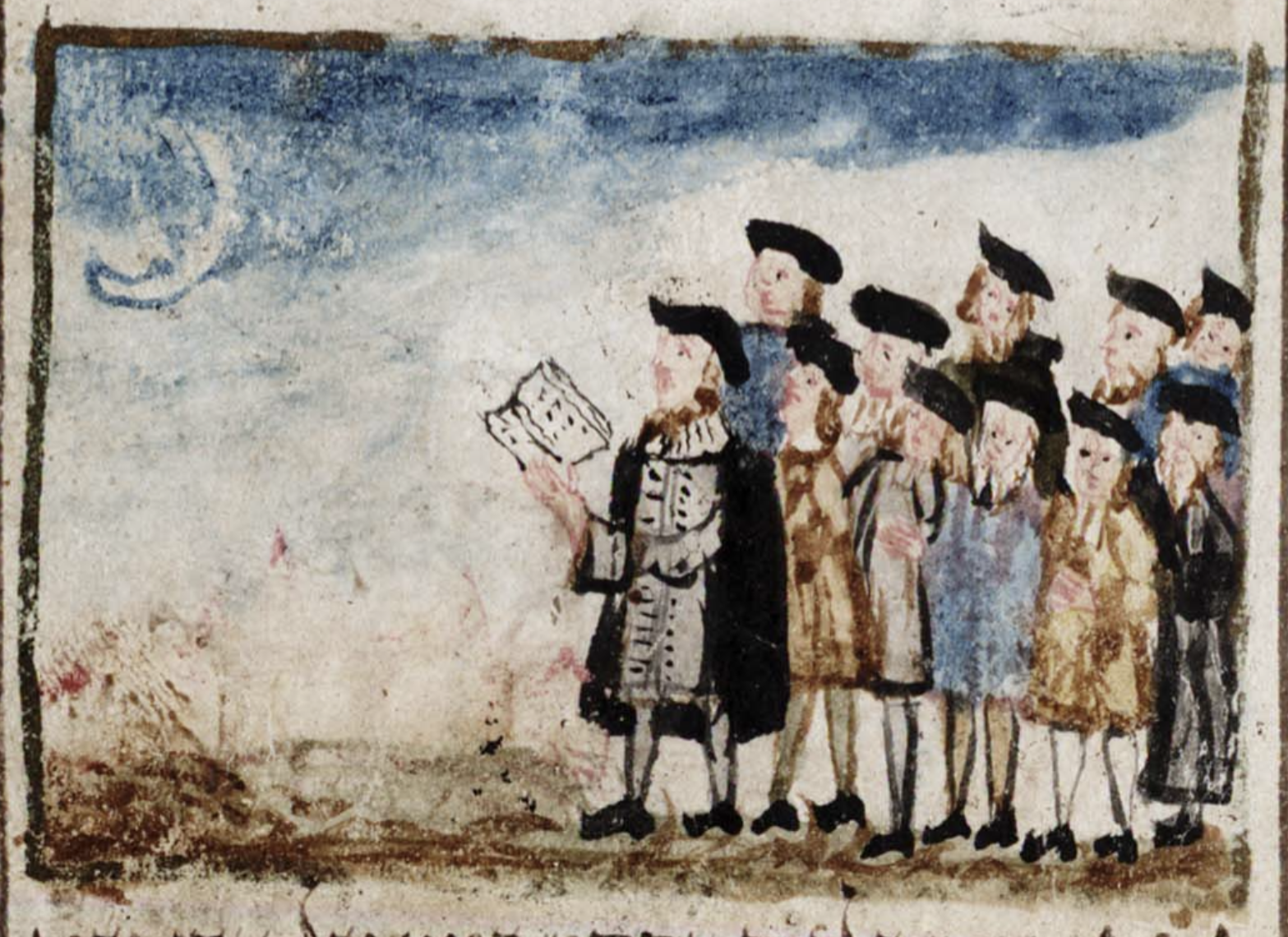
1738 (Fürth)

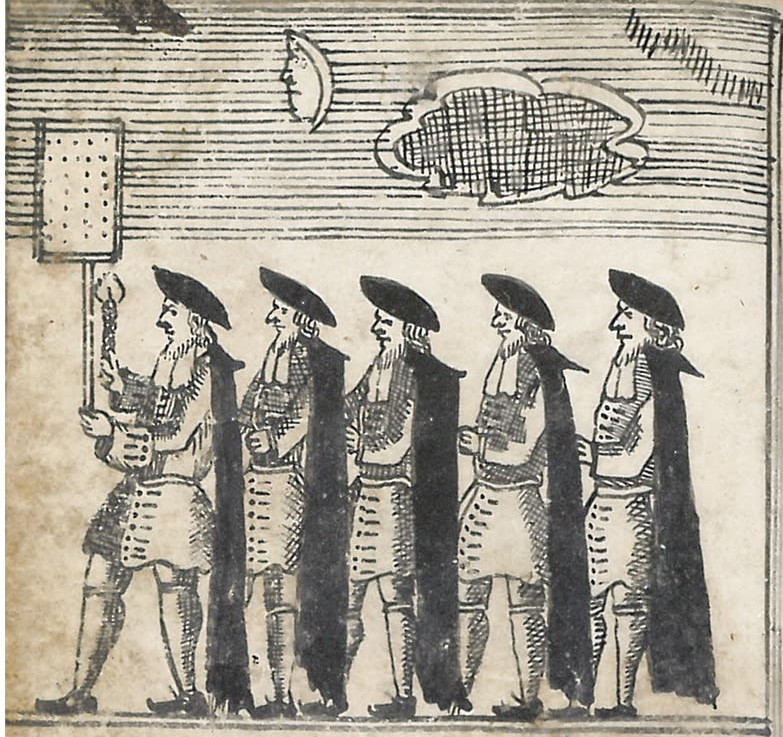
1738 (Germany)

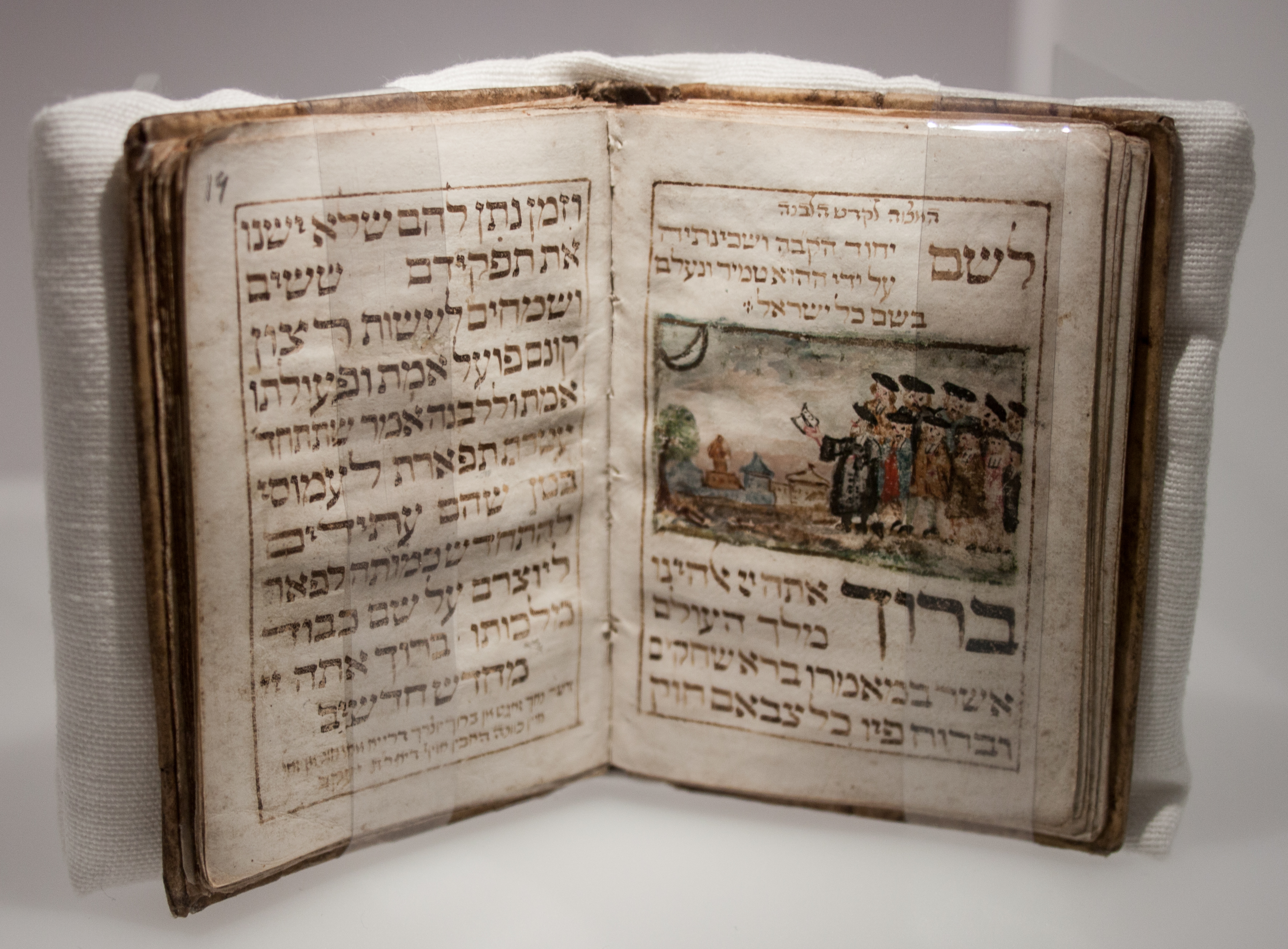
1739

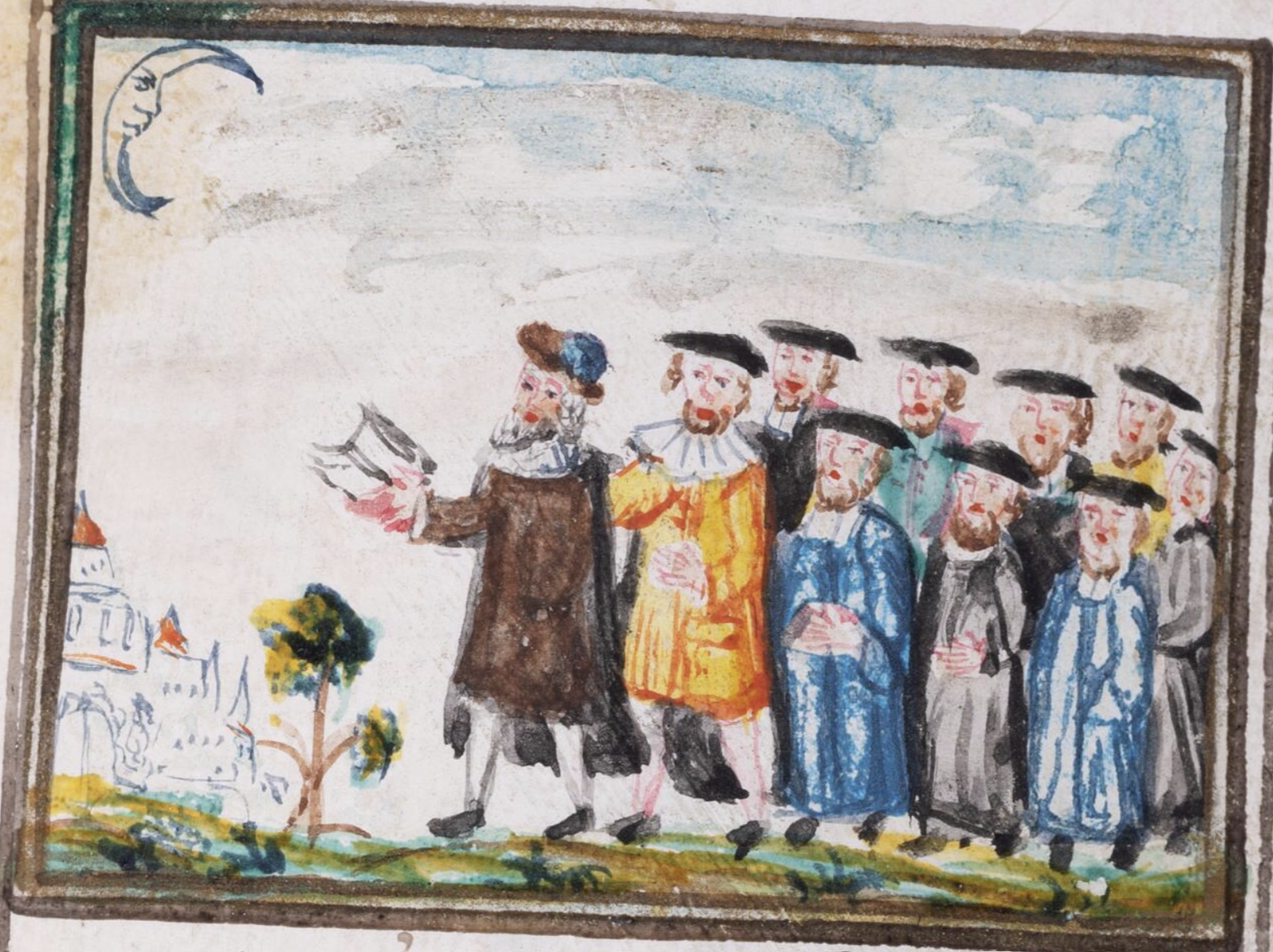
c. 1725-1750

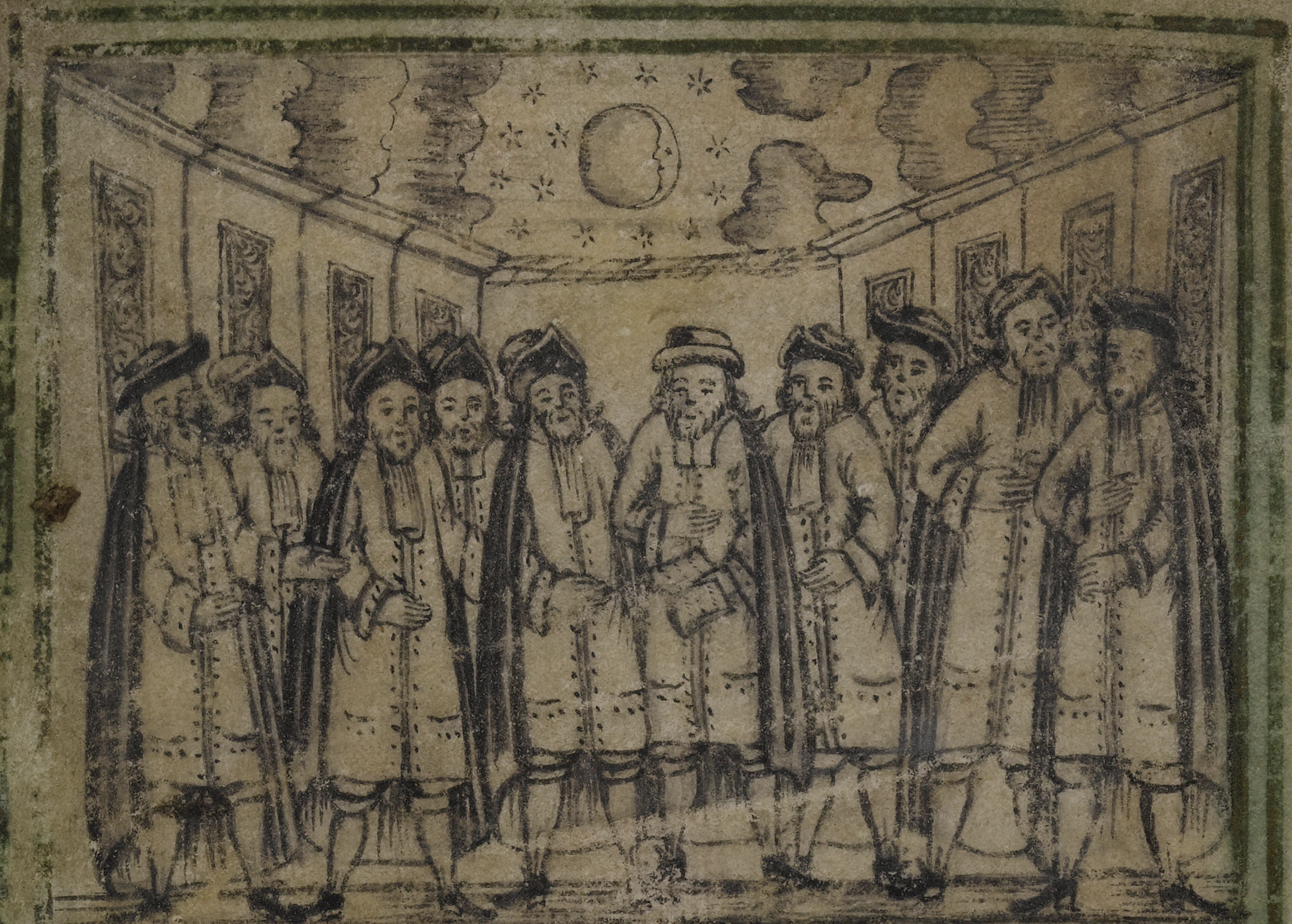
1743 (Note: Or possibly 1733. Schrijver (1993). p. 111.) (Mannheim?), by Simha Pihem Segal

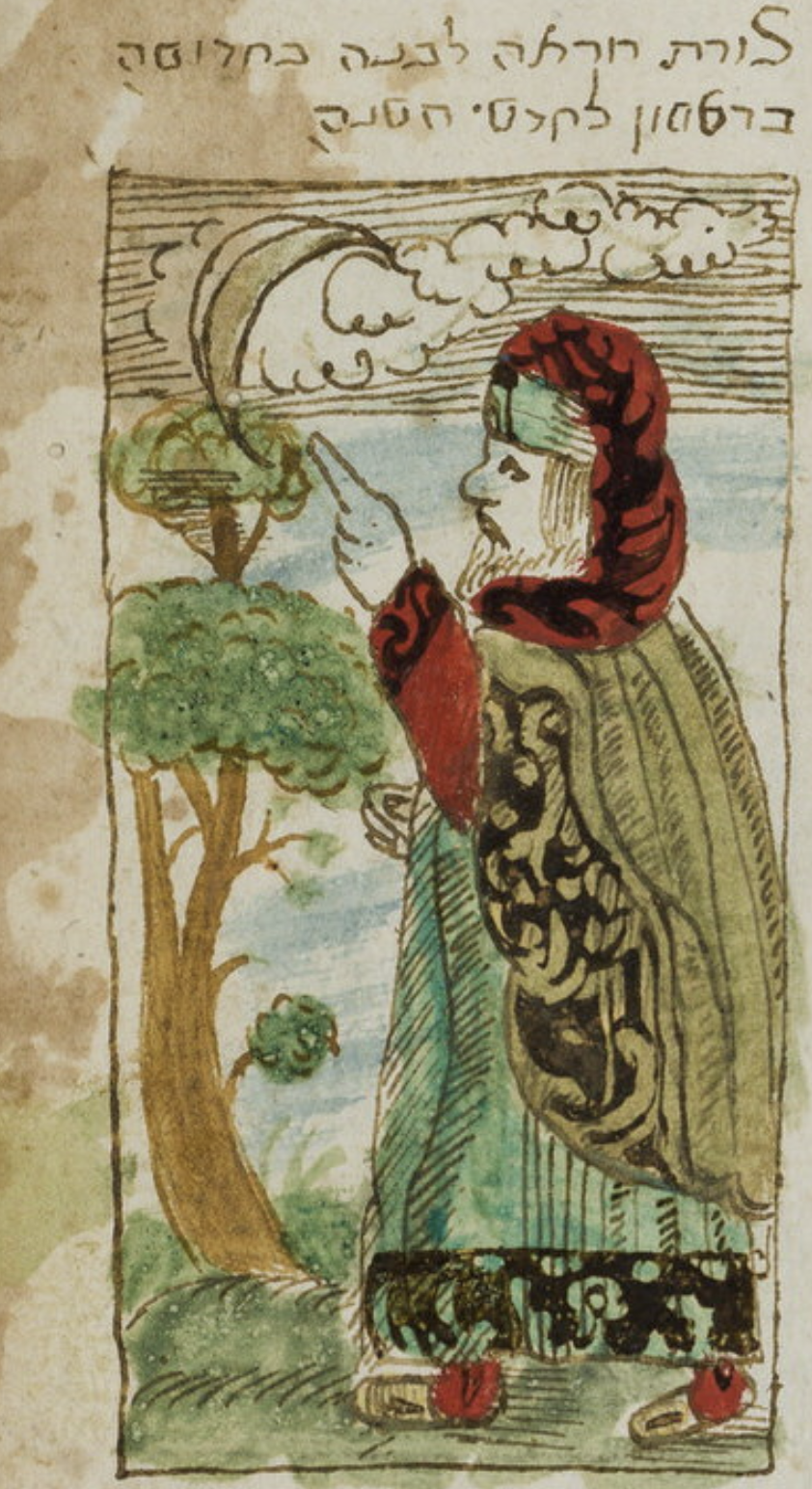
1743 (Italy), by Jacob ben Joseph Conegliano

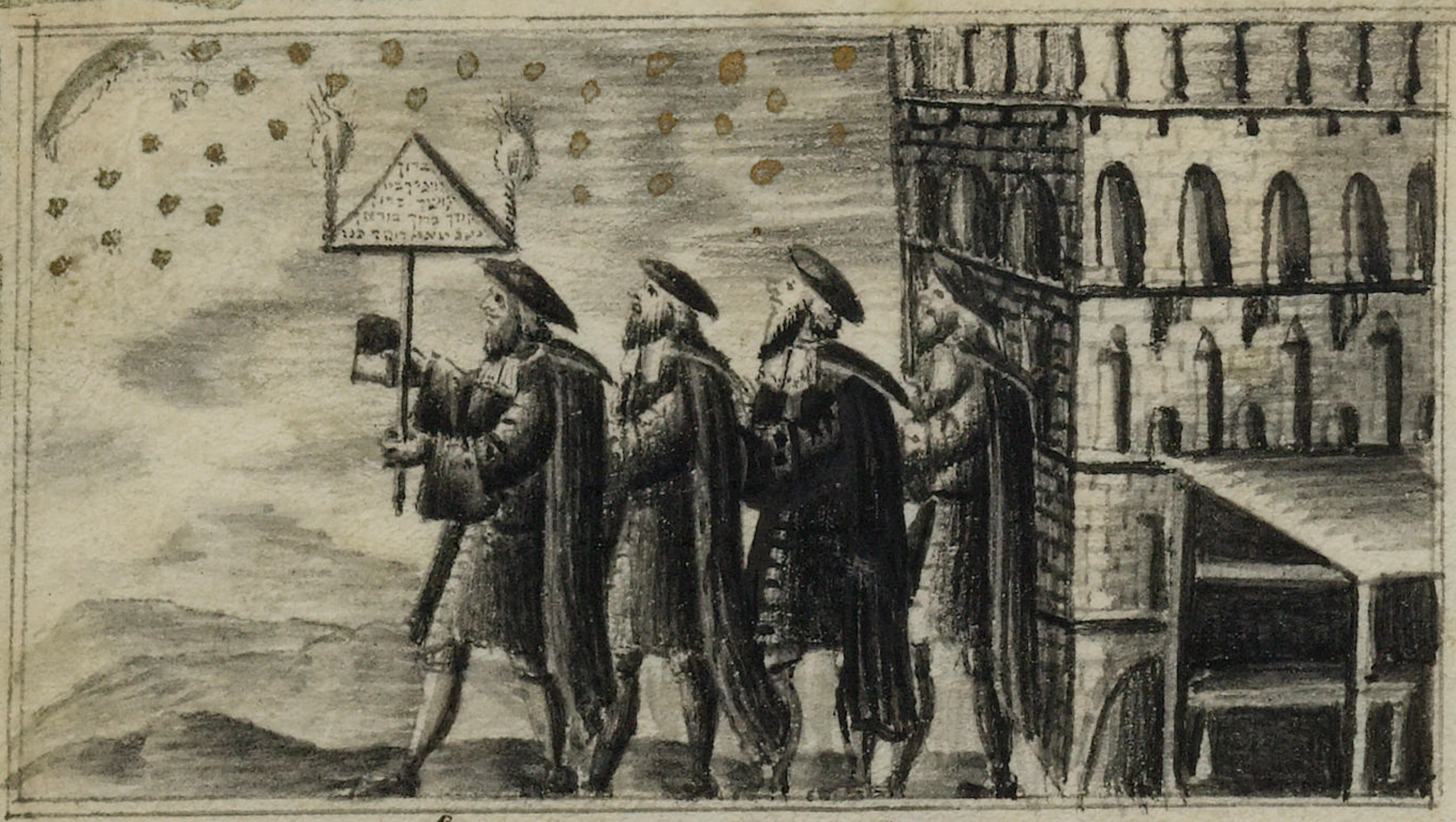
1744, perhaps by Wolf Leib Katz Poppers of Hildesheim

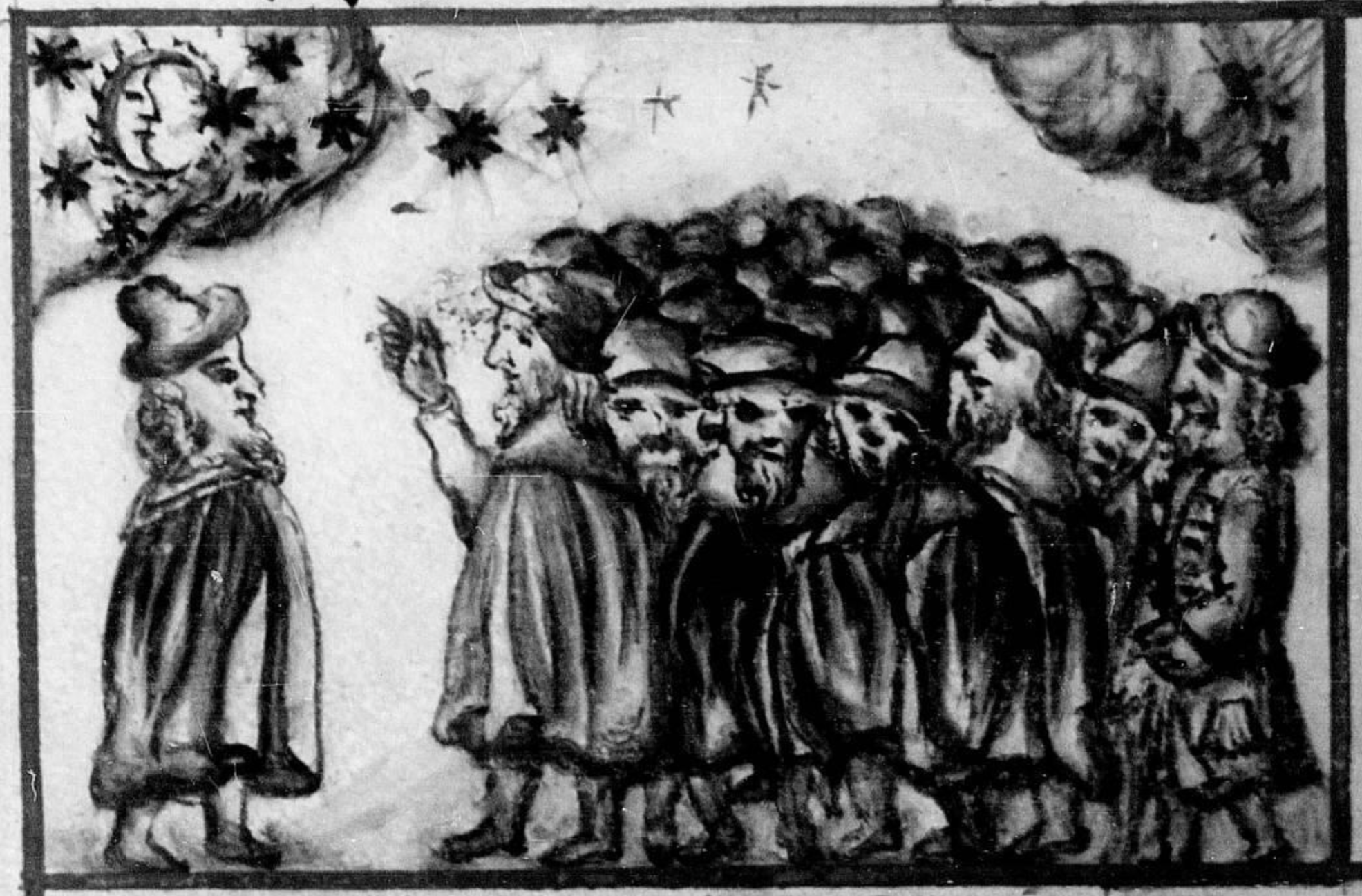
1748, by Israel ben Jacob Leib Shammas (AHW)

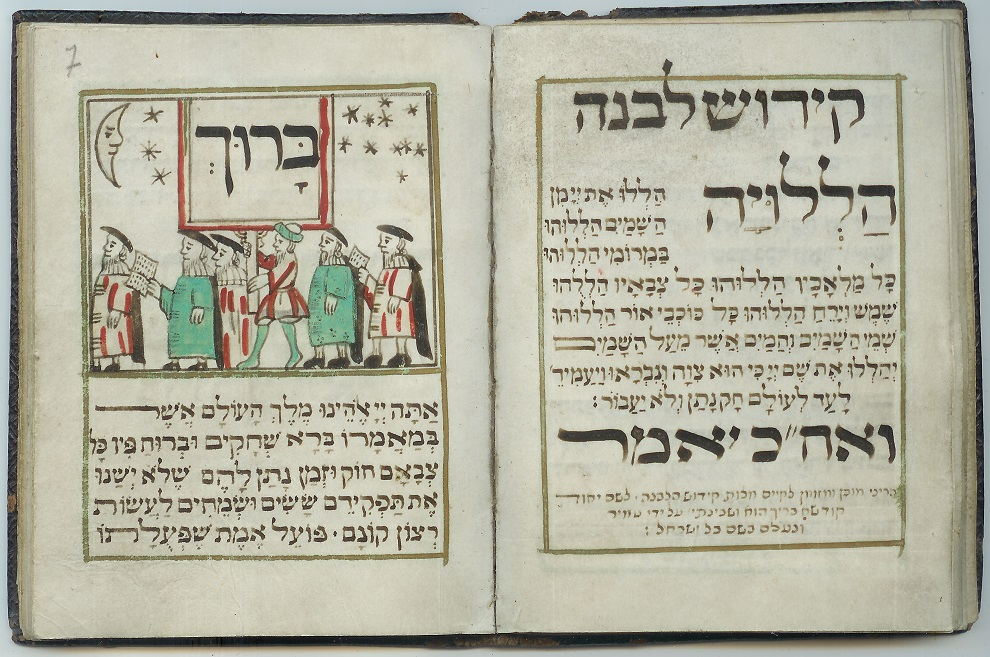
1752

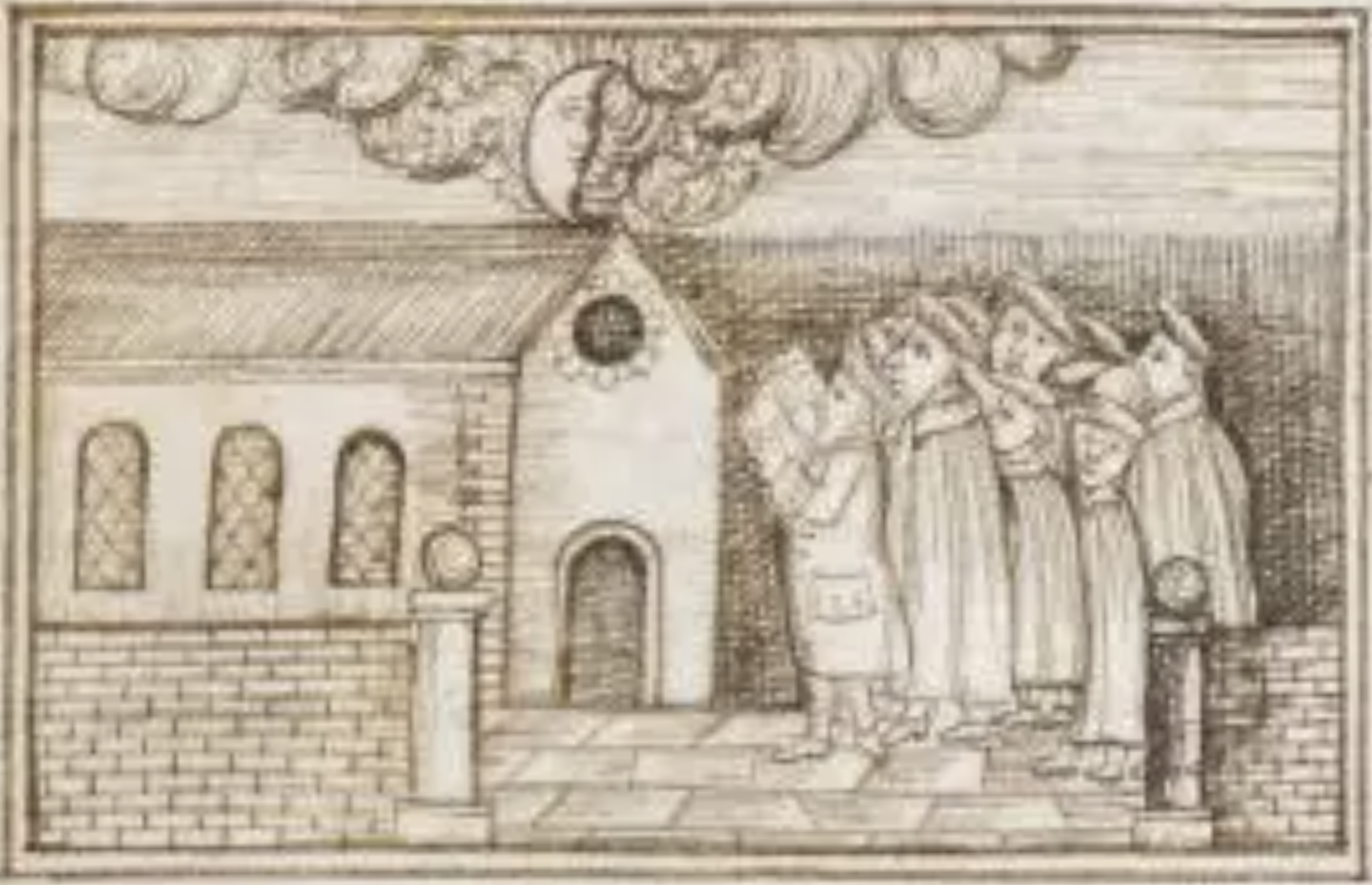
1767 (Nancy), by Levi Offenbach

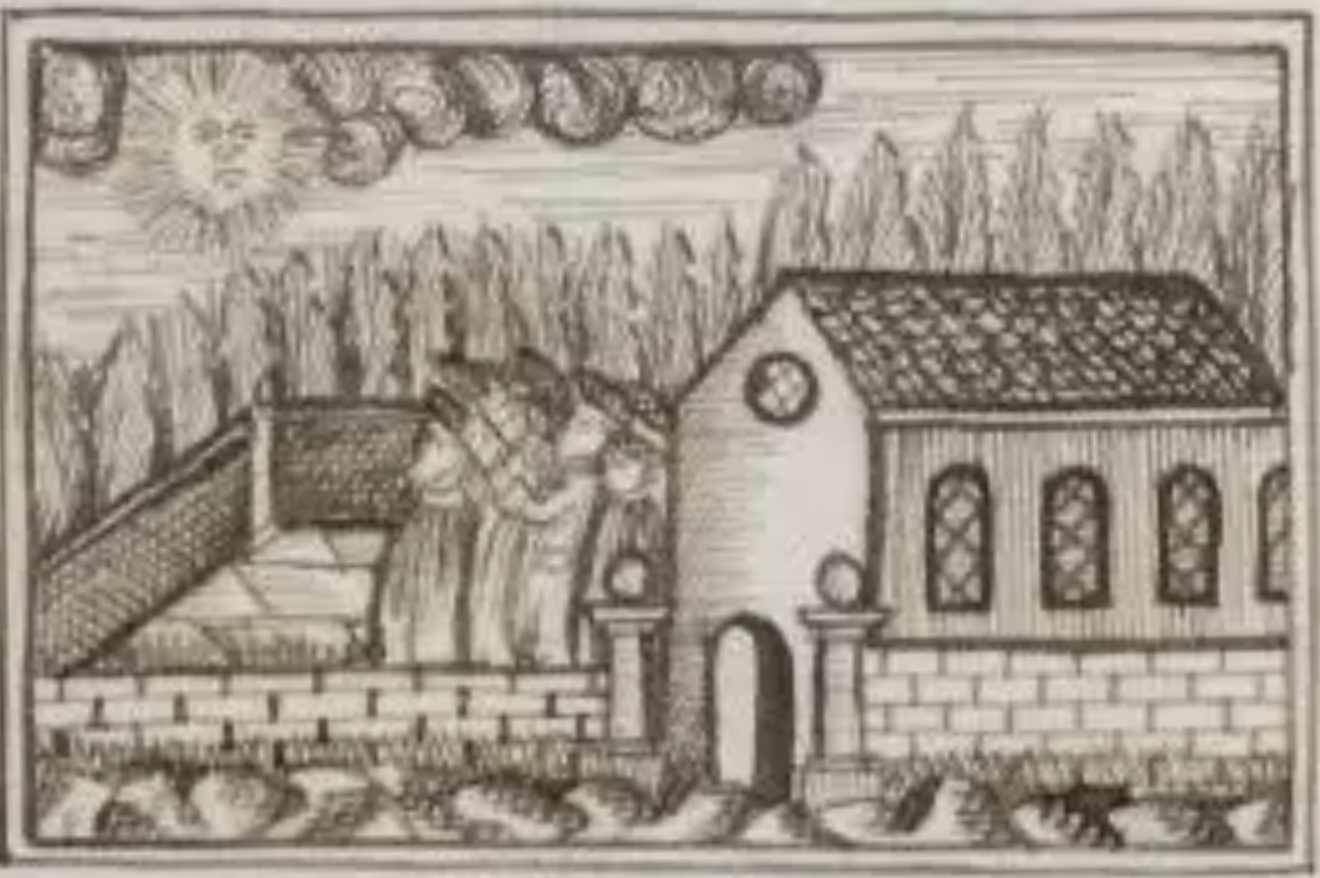
1768 (Nancy), by Levi Offenbach

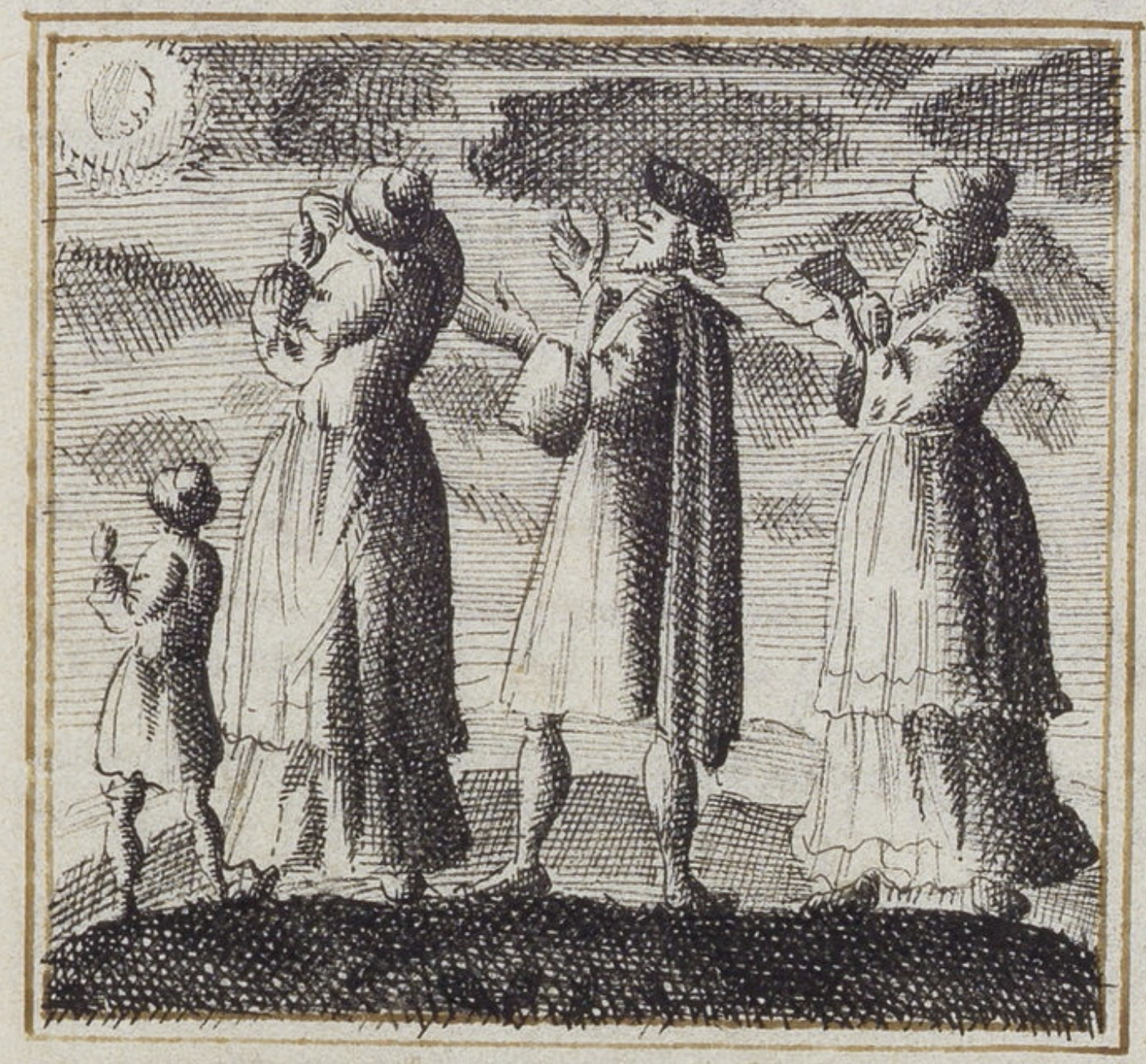
1775, by Wolf Leib Katz Poppers of Hildesheim

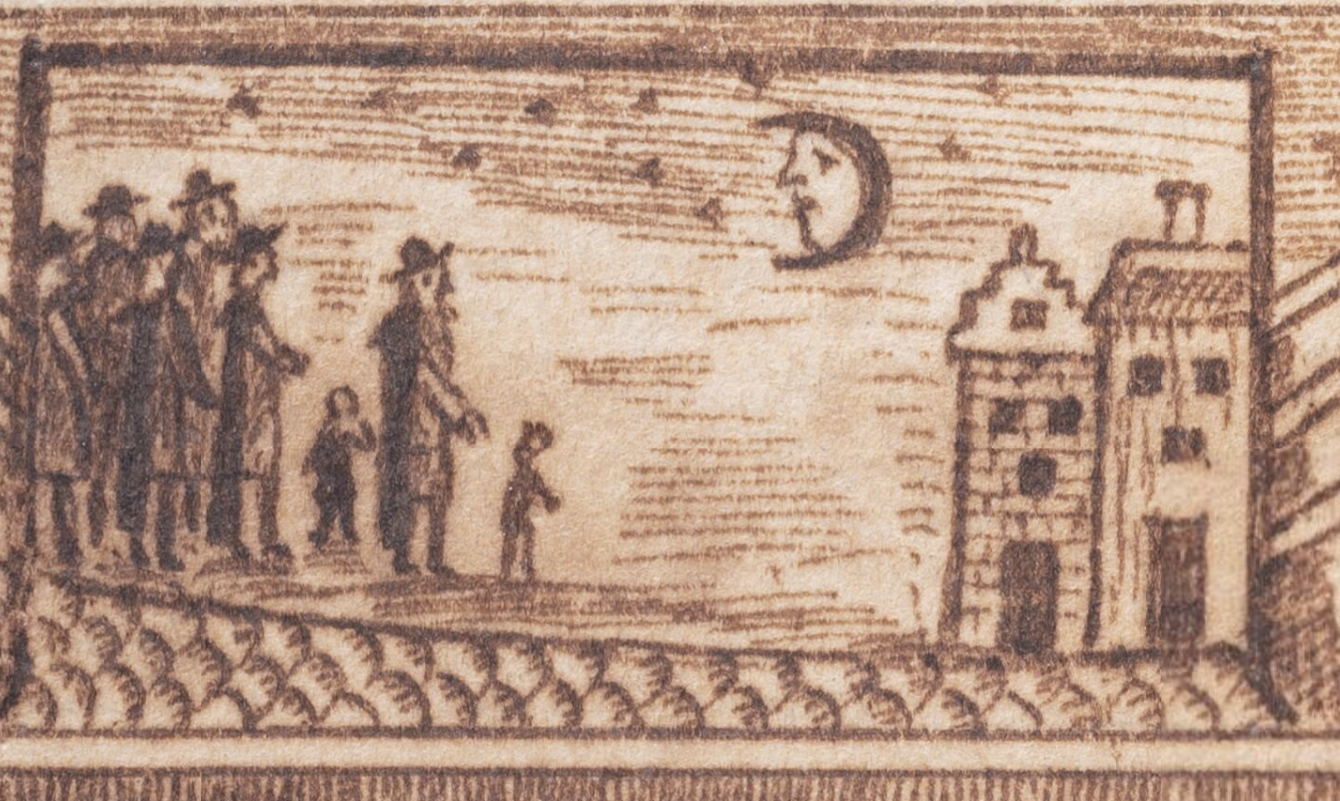
1787 (Rotterdam), by Abraham Ziskind Weisna

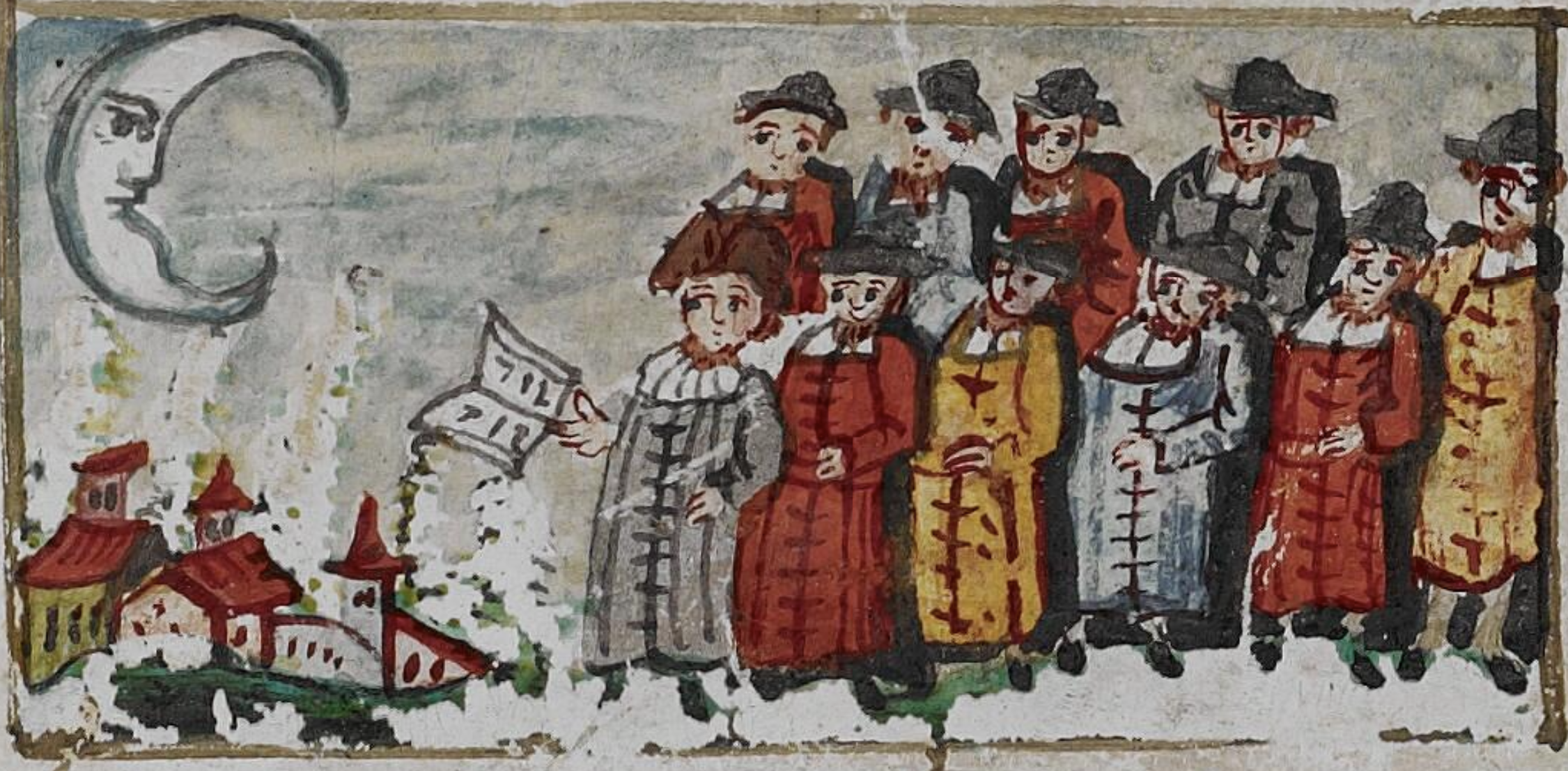
1793 (Fürth) (Note: A similar illumination appears in a 1735 manuscript held by the Jewish Museum, also made in Fürth (accession #1986-160a-b, shelf L1985.13.2). This 1793 example is said to be a "reduced" imitation. Mann, Vivian B. (1986) Treasures of the Jewish Museum. pp. 68-69. Ibid. (2005). Art and Ceremony in Jewish Life. pp. 318-320. See also the 1737-1739 examples on this page.)

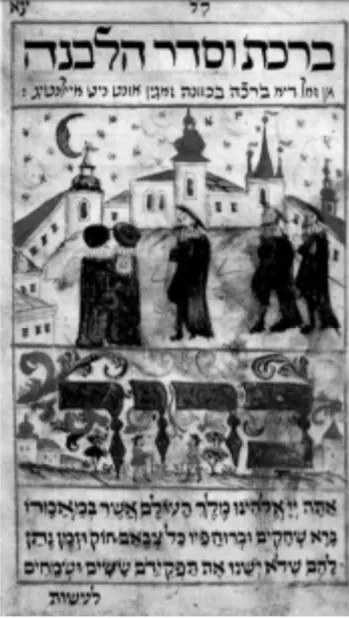
18th-century

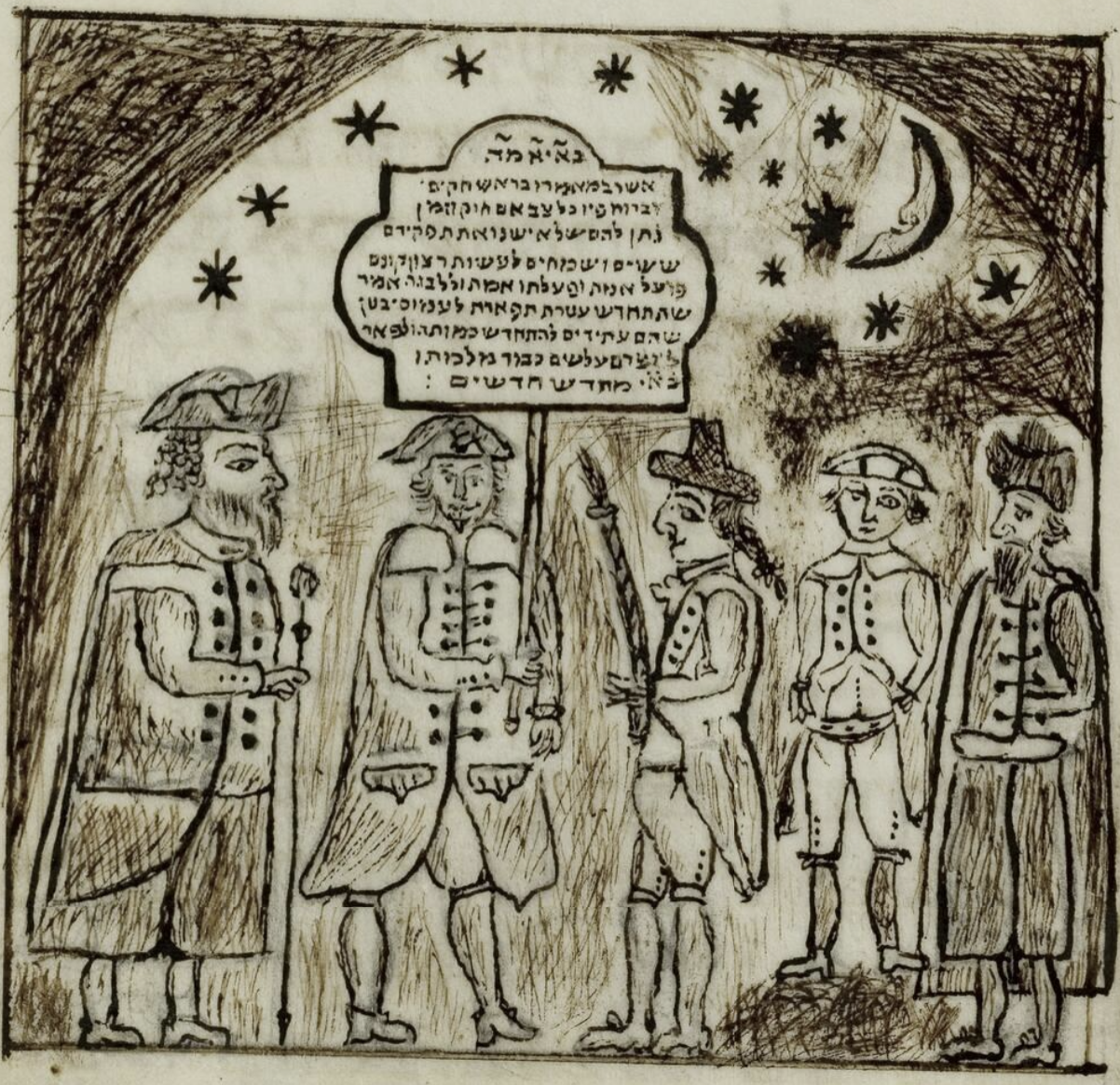
1795 (Amsterdam)

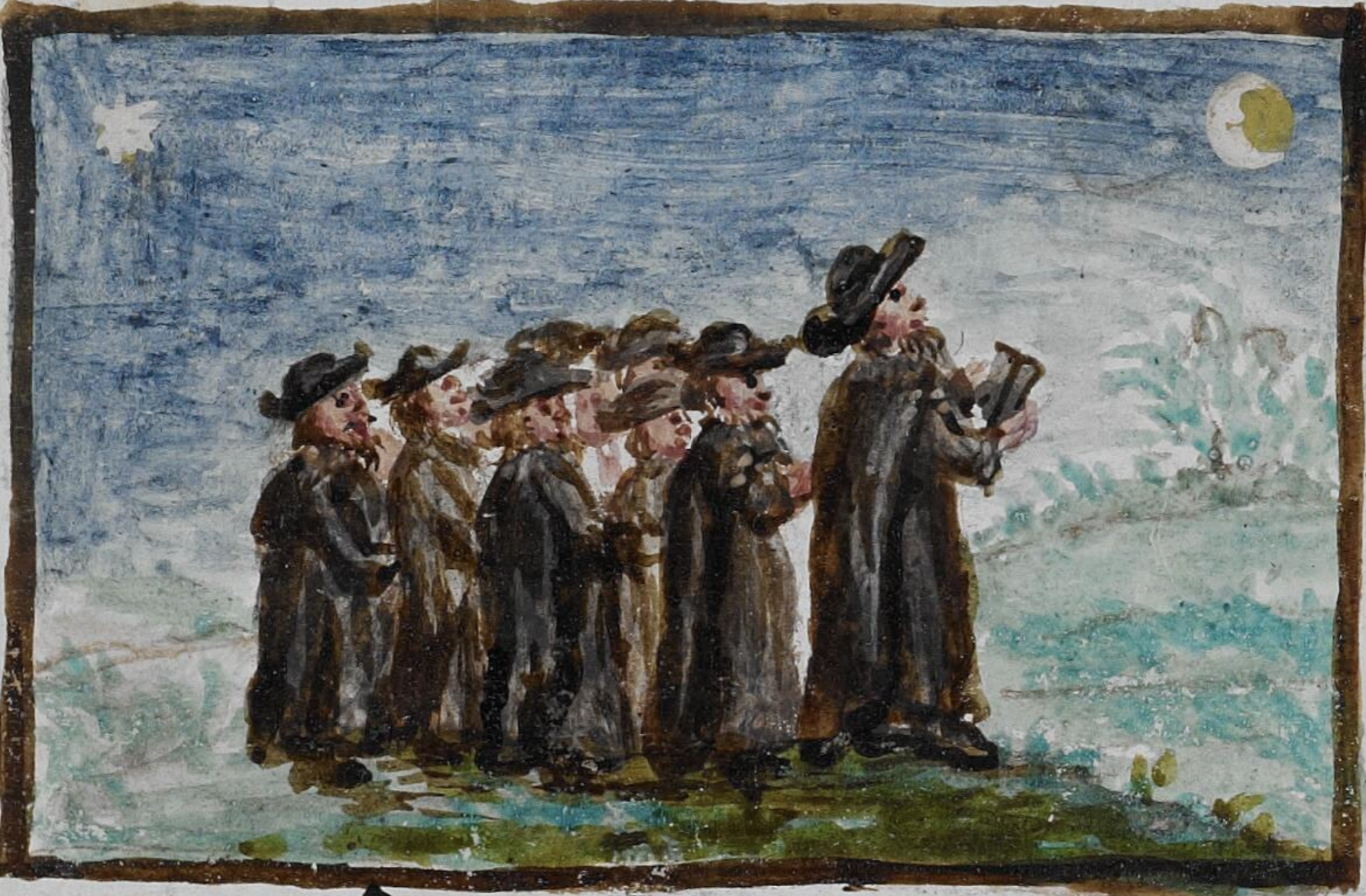
Undated

== Postcards (1875–1925) ==
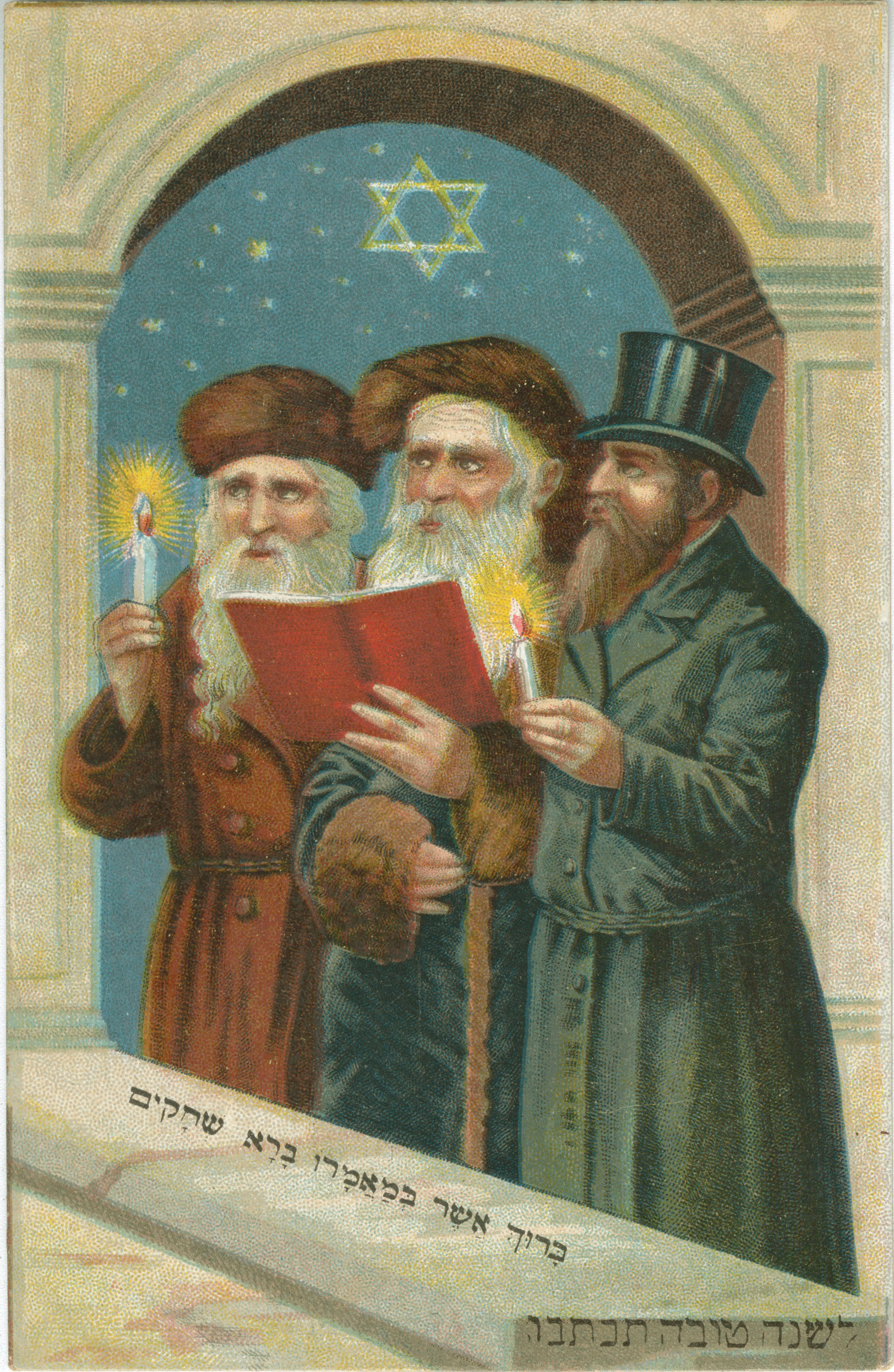

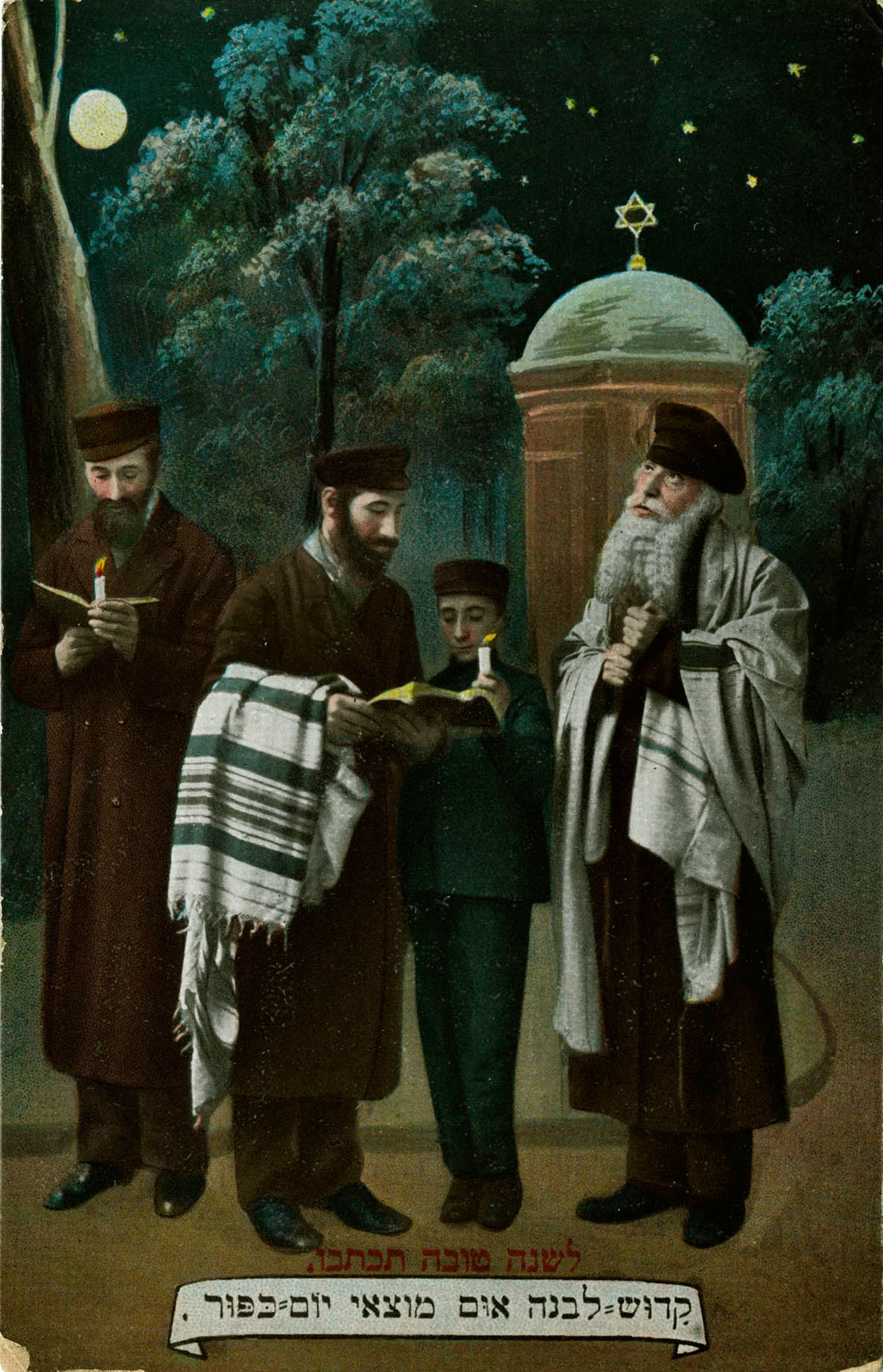
Williamsburg Art Co., New York. (printed in Germany)

by Friedrich Kaskeline

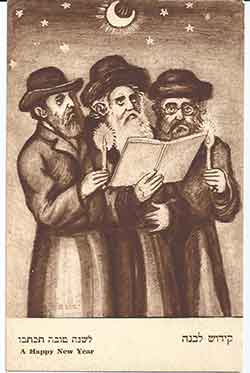

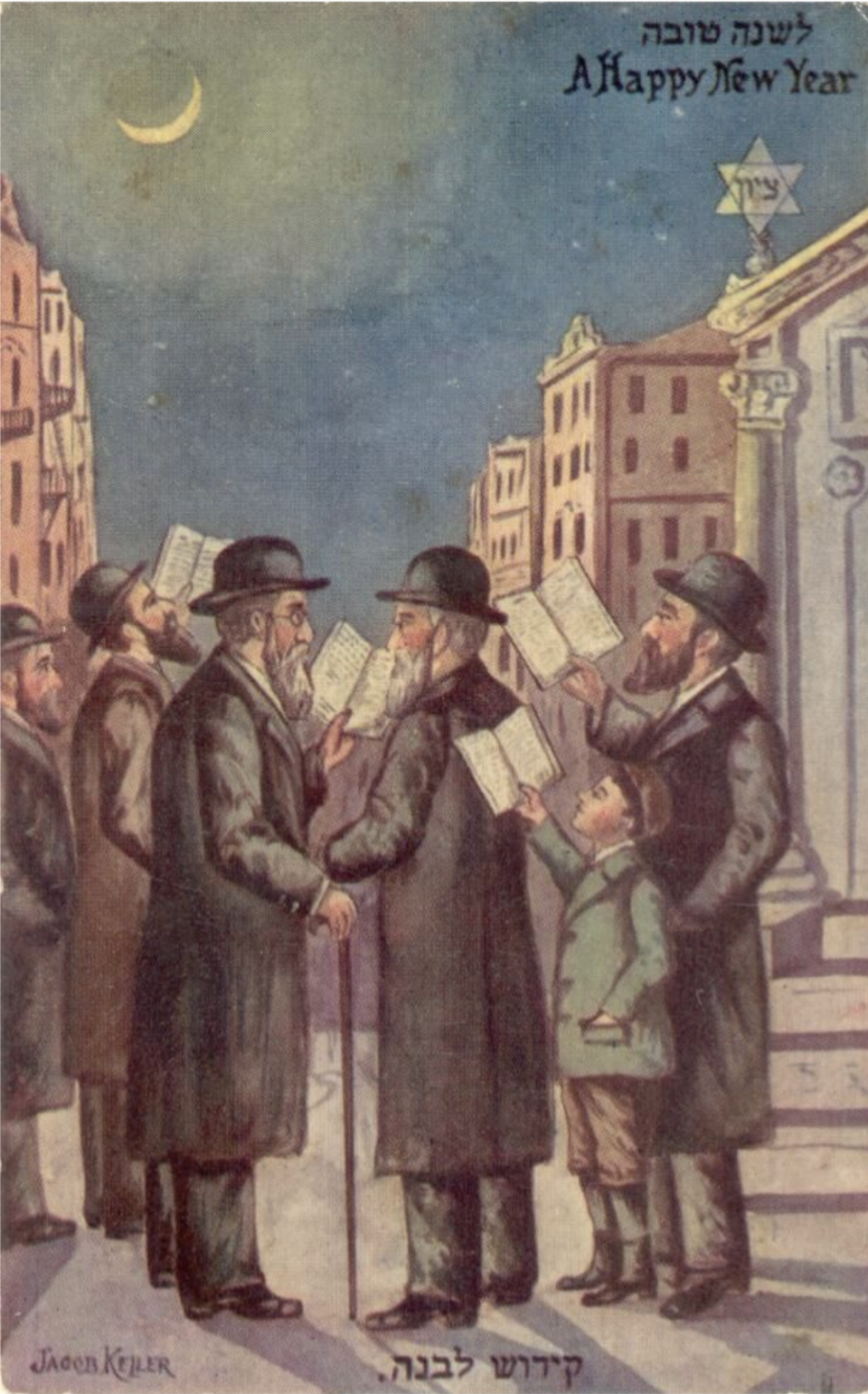
c. 1910, by Jacob Keller (United States)
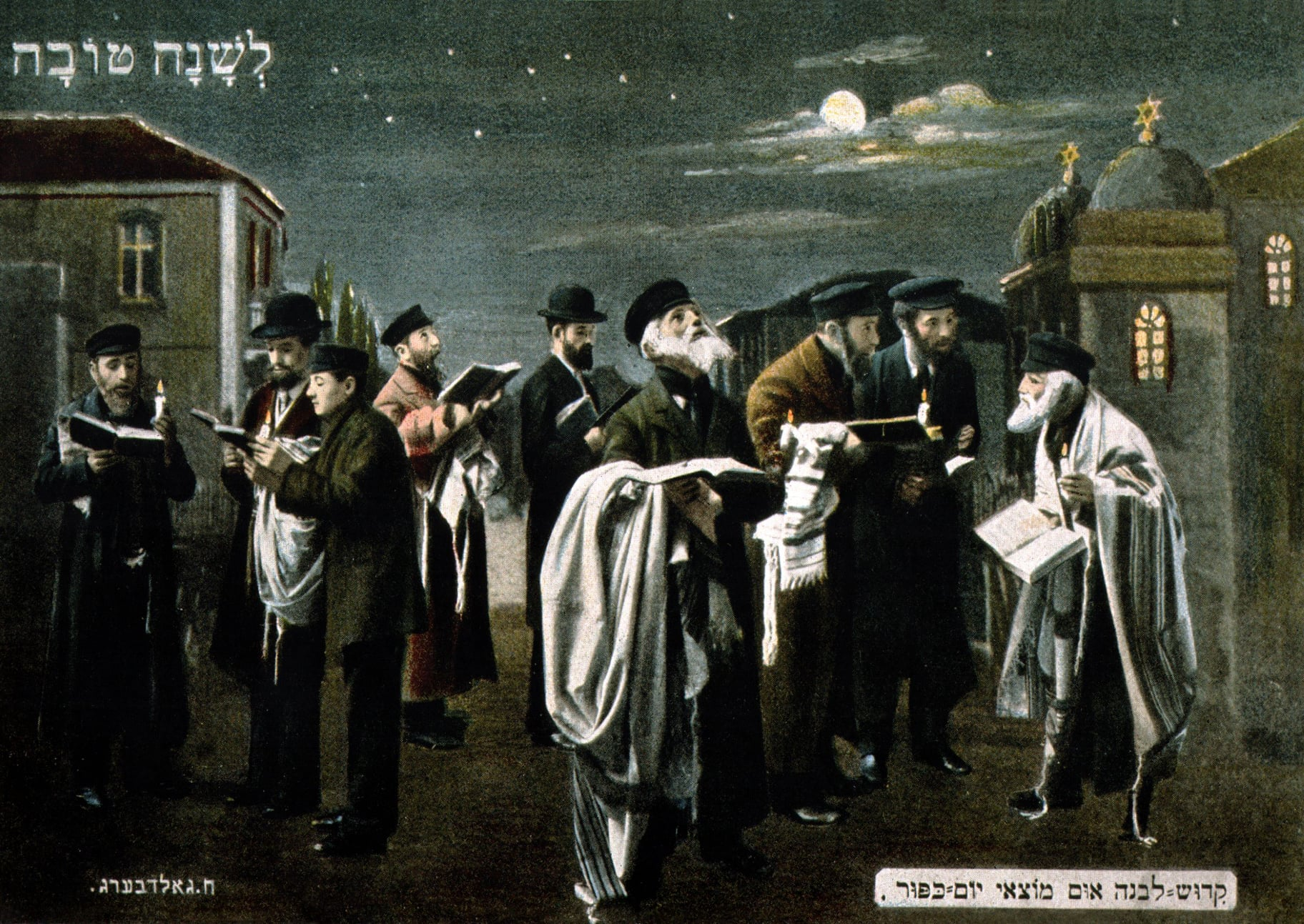
c. 1900, by Haim Goldberg (Austria)

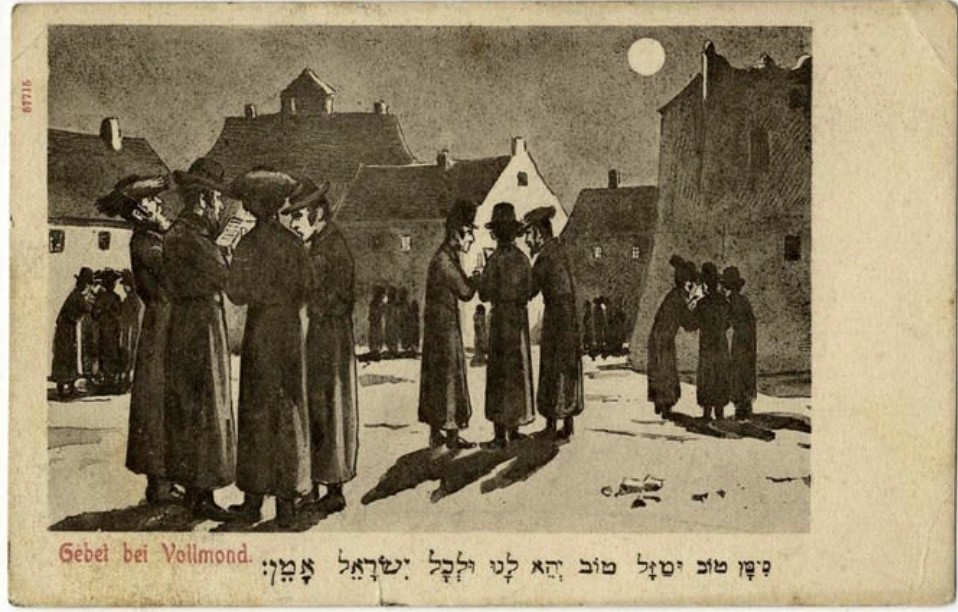
1903

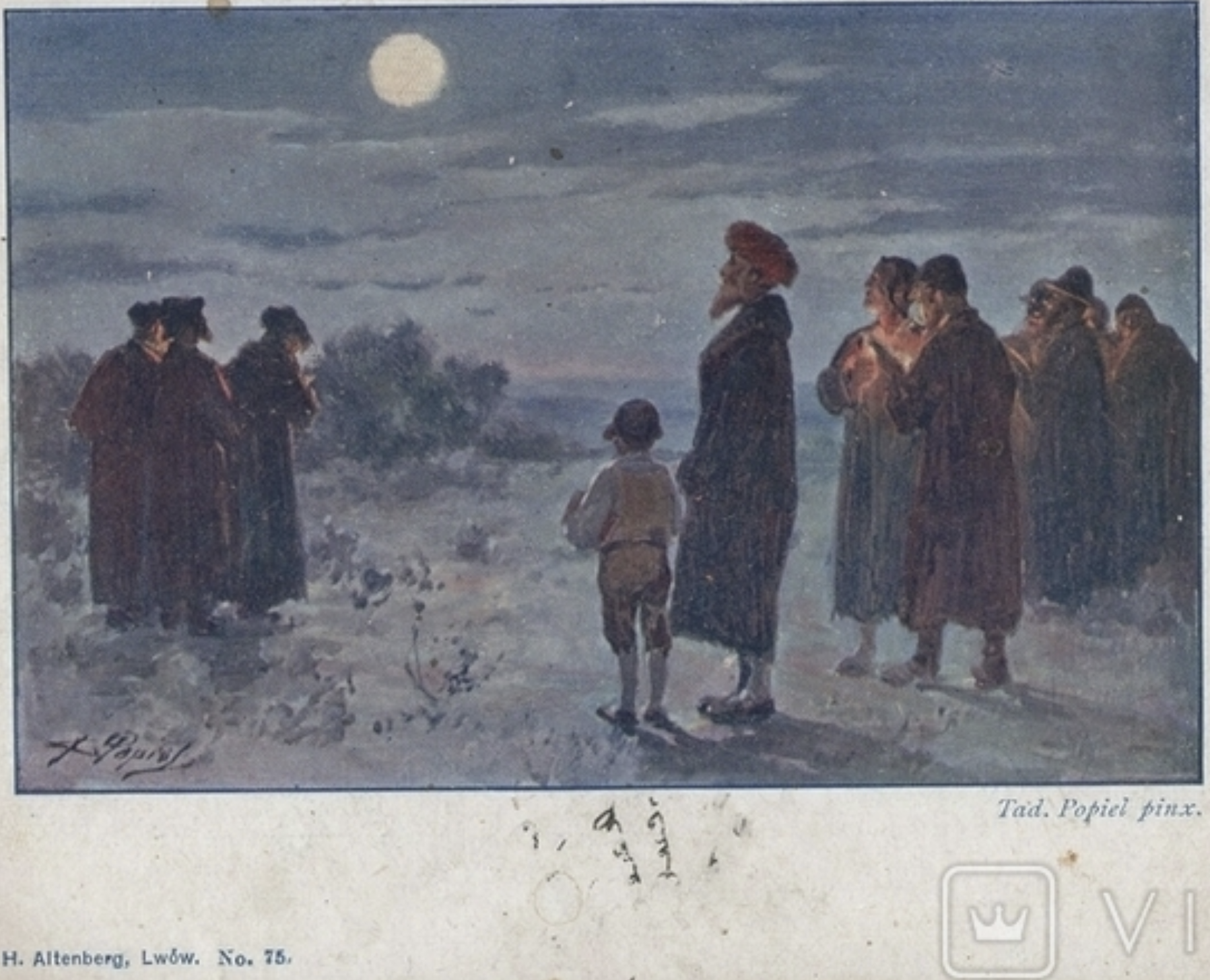
1905 postcard, by Tadeusz Popiel (Lviv)

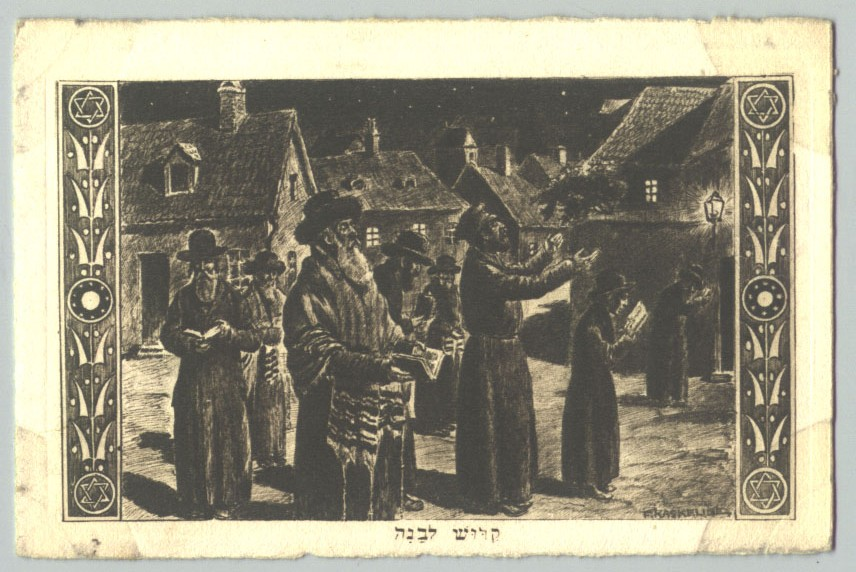
c. 1920, by Friedrich Kaskeline

== Artwork ==
Kiddush levana appeared on many fin de siècle holiday cards, and on a 2016 Russian postage stamp. Notable modern artists have depicted Kiddush levana, including Yitzhak Frenkel, Joseph Budko, Max Weber, Lionel S. Reiss Emanuel Glicen Romano, Hendel Lieberman, Zalman Kleinman, Moshe Castel Zvi Malnovitzer, Elena Flerova, Jerzy Duda-Gracz, Boris Shapiro, Simcha Nornberg, Shmuel Bonneh, Israel Hershberg, Ezekiel Schloss, Reuven Rubin, Haim Goldberg, Tadeusz Popiel, Hermann Junker, Jacob Steinhardt, and Artur Markowicz. (Note: One 1904 text from Isfahan is decorated with depictions of saint-graves in Israel and Iran, including the tomb attributed to Serah, which Iranian Jews used as a protective charm. It has been inaccurately described as a "Birkat halevana", but actually contains only the Rosh Chodesh mussaf. Reproduced in Bialer, Yehuda L. (1975). Jewish Life in Art and Tradition. p. 136.)

In 1986, Menahem Berman created Hallelujah, being a clock for Kiddush levana, which is an electronic device that displays the current moon phase by illuminating one of 30 masked lenses on a silver dial. Psalm 148 is engraved on its base in Merubah, a late 18th-century prayerbook typeface.

Noa Ginzburg's MFA thesis, Kiddush Levana, The Moon Is Your Handheld Mirror (2019), aimed "to disarm anthropocentric points of view and speak of temporality and displacement".

=== Gallery ===
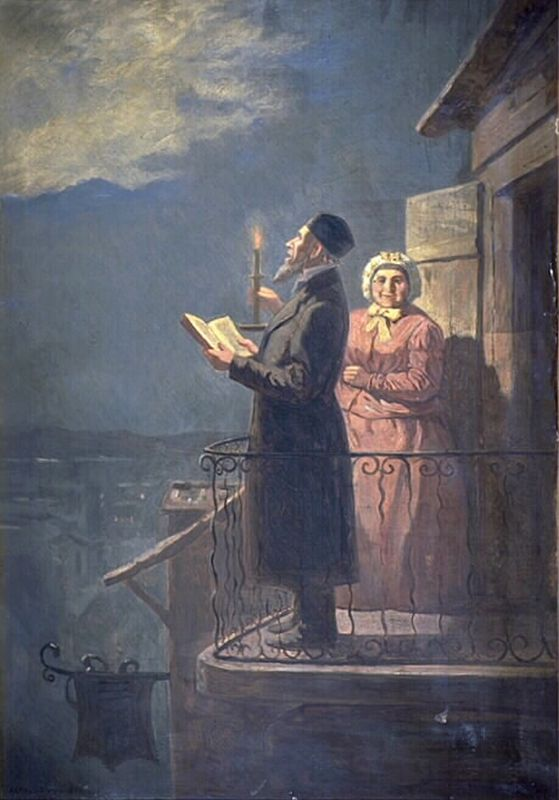
Blessing of the New Moon (1883) by Alphonse Levy (Note: Published as an etching in L'Univers illustré on 13 October 1883 (Retrieved March 16, 2025 - via MAHJ), and reviewed by Hippolyte Prague in Archives israélites on 18 October (Vol. XLIV. p. 335. Retrieved on January 19, 2025 – via Google Books). Emery I. Gondor created a similar image, with a man and boy, for Zeligs, Dorothy F. (1941). The Story of Jewish Holidays. p. 222.)

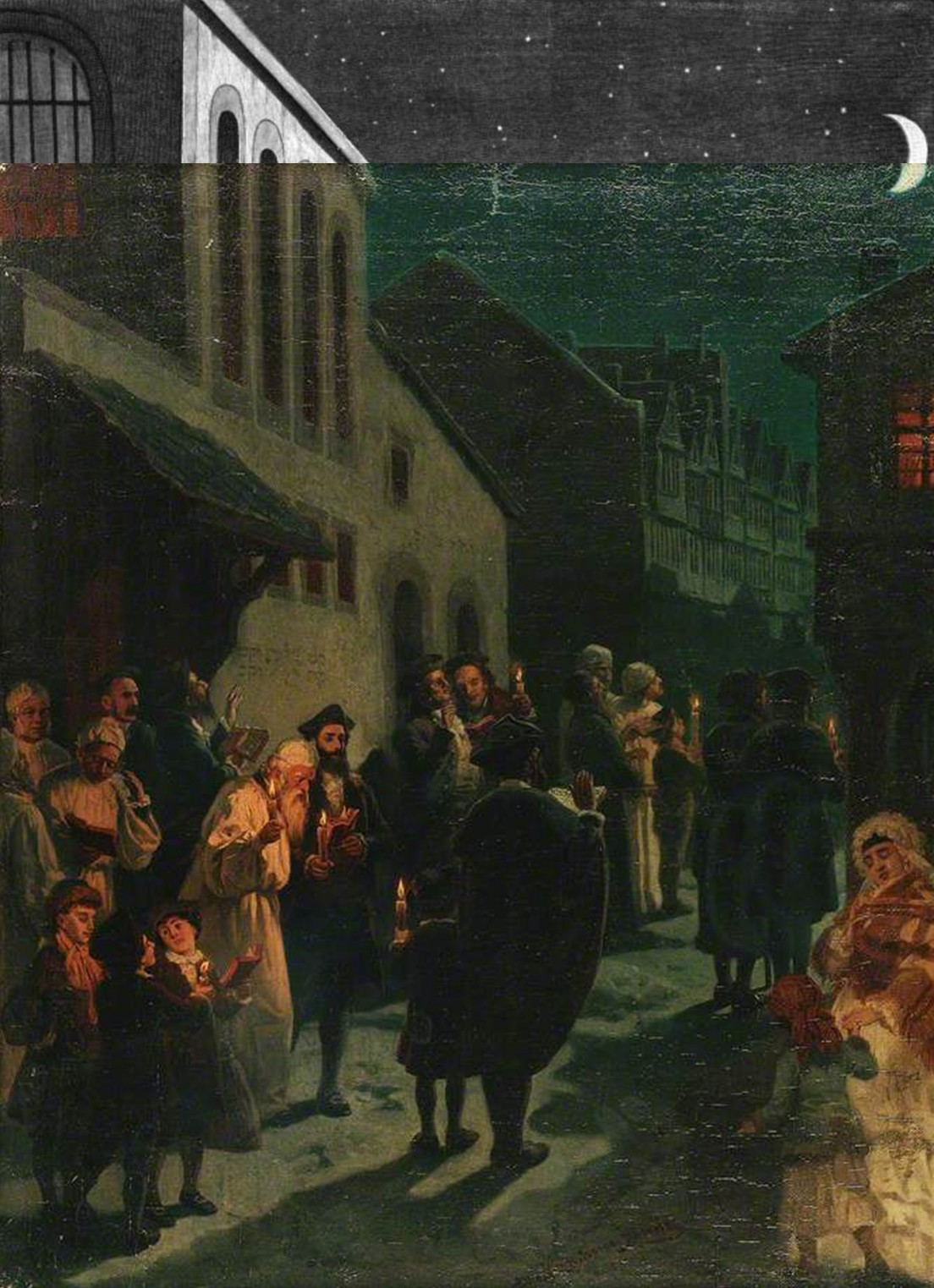
Blessing of the New Moon (1883) by Hermann Junker. (Note: Image shown is a composite which restores the missing upper margin from an engraving published in Über Land und Meer (1886), p. 705.) Moses Mendelssohn, Leopold Kompert, James de Rothschild, Salomon Popper (1839-1889), (Note: A cantor. See obituary in Cantoren-Zeitung for January 11, 1890. pp. 6-7.) and Elias Ullmann are seen in Frankfurt.

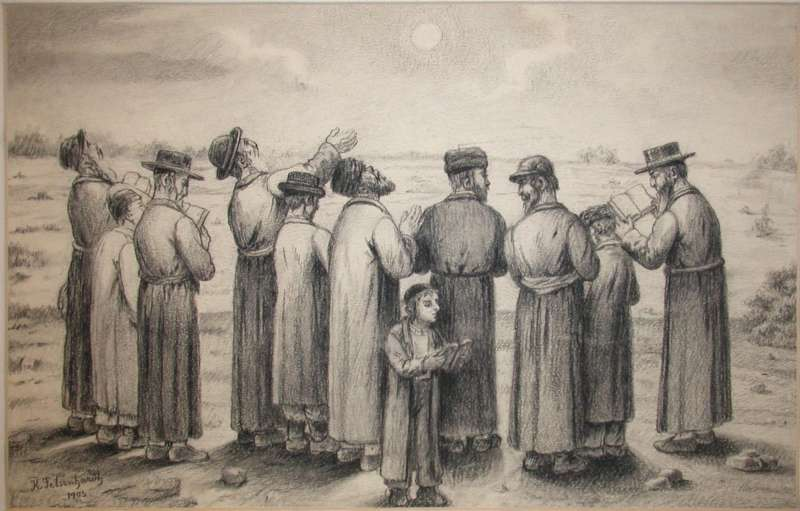
1903 chalk drawing by Karl Pelzenhardt

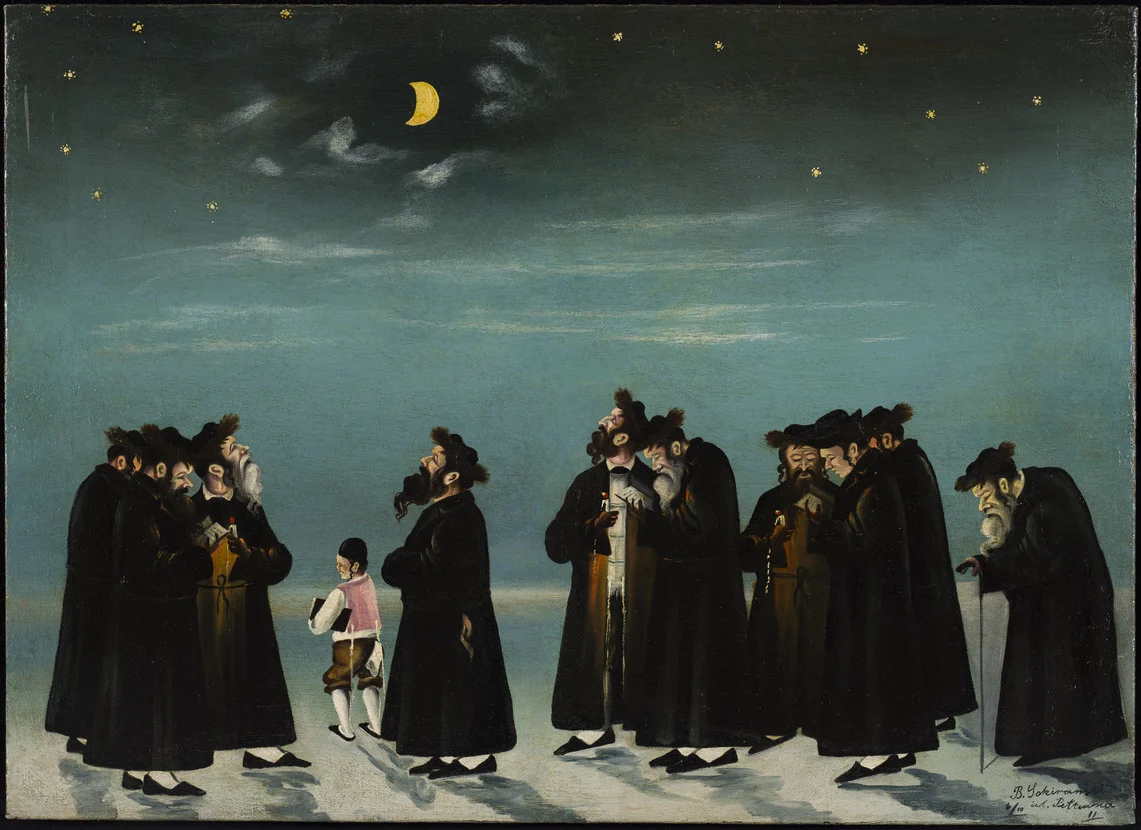
Painting by Bentzion Sokiranski (1887–1953)

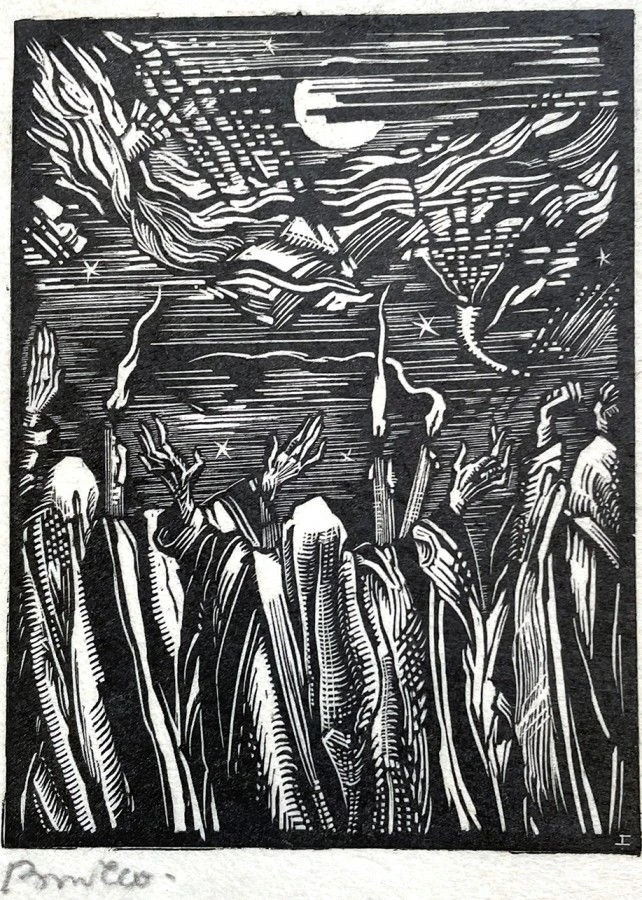
Welcoming the New Moon. Etching by Joseph Budko (1888–1940)

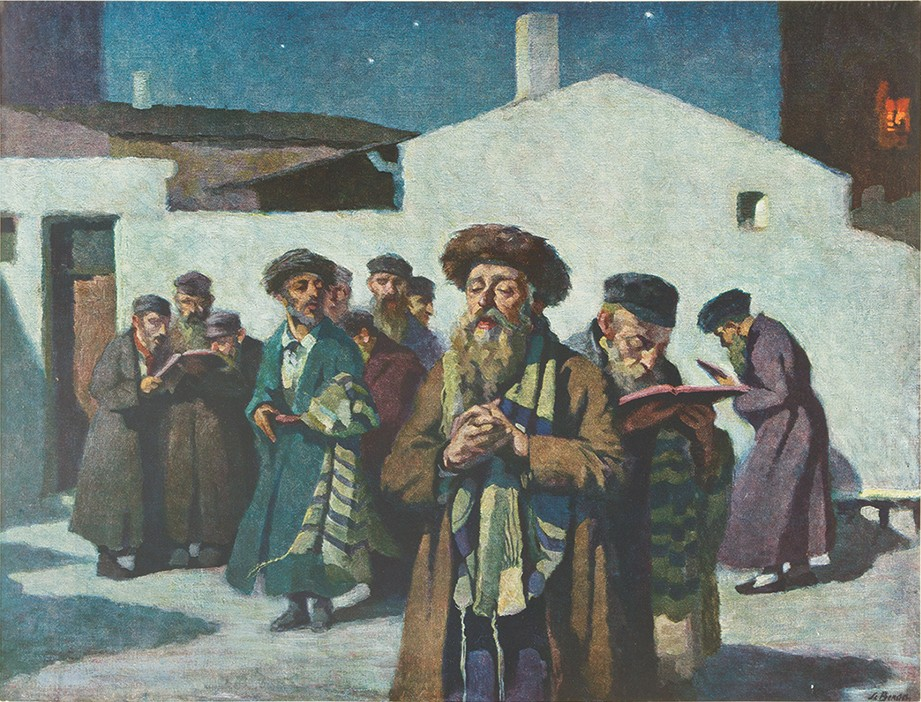
Moon Prayer (1919) by Stanisław Bender (Note: Advertised under the title Mondgebet. Panned by Yiddishe Tageblatt on June 11, 1922 p. [8].)

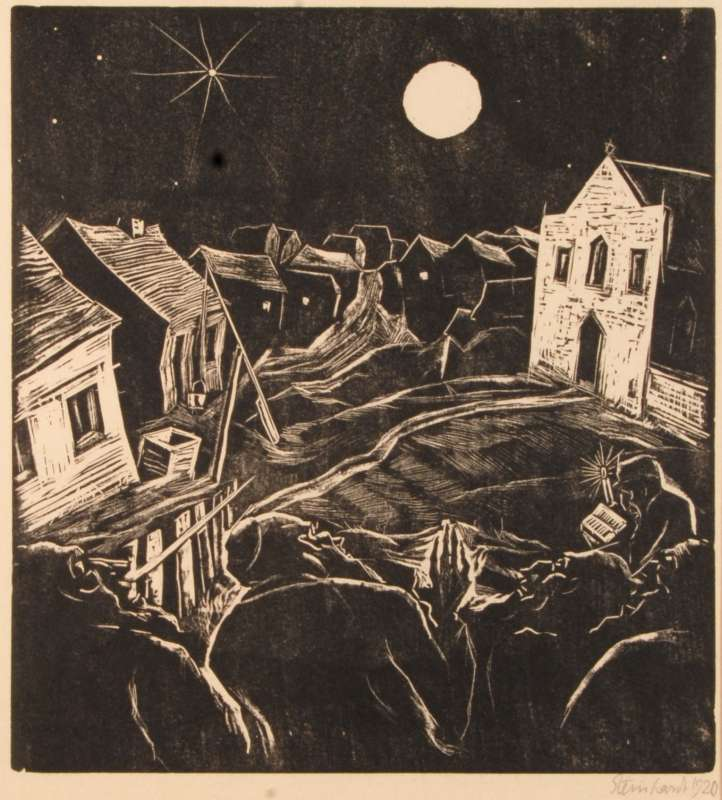
Birkat halevana (1920) by Jacob Steinhardt. Woodcut.

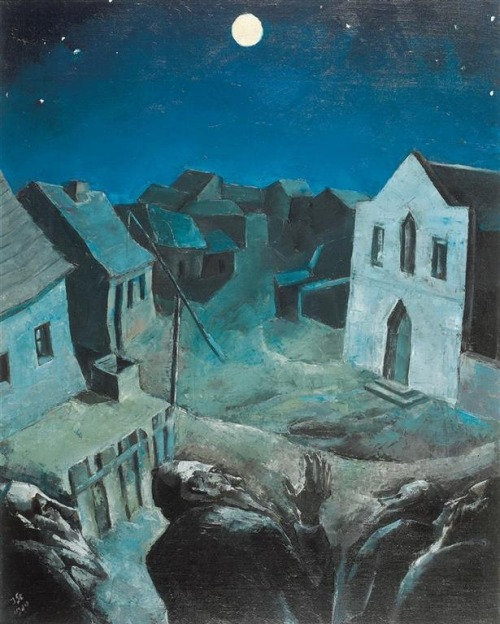
Levona benschen (1920) by Jacob Steinhardt. Oil on canvas.

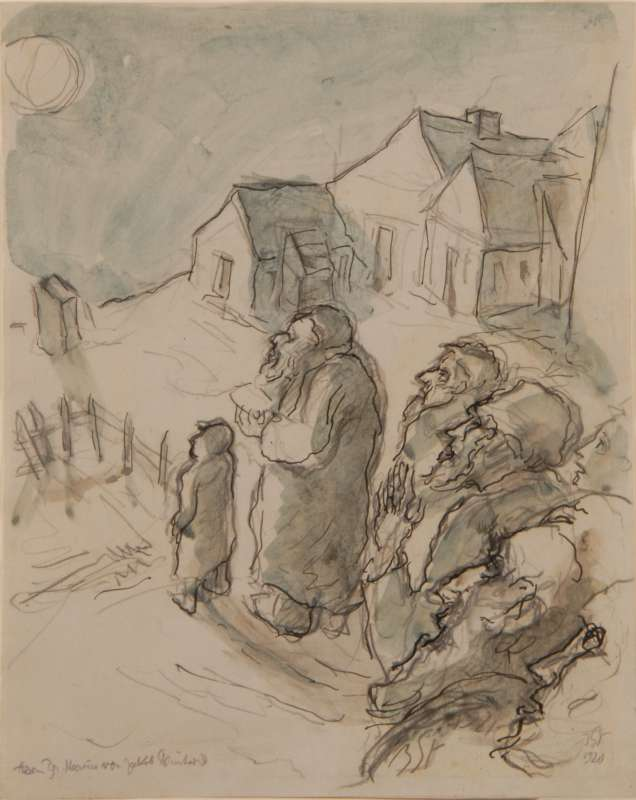
Birkat halevana (1920) by Jacob Steinhardt. Graphite, watercolor, and ink on paper.

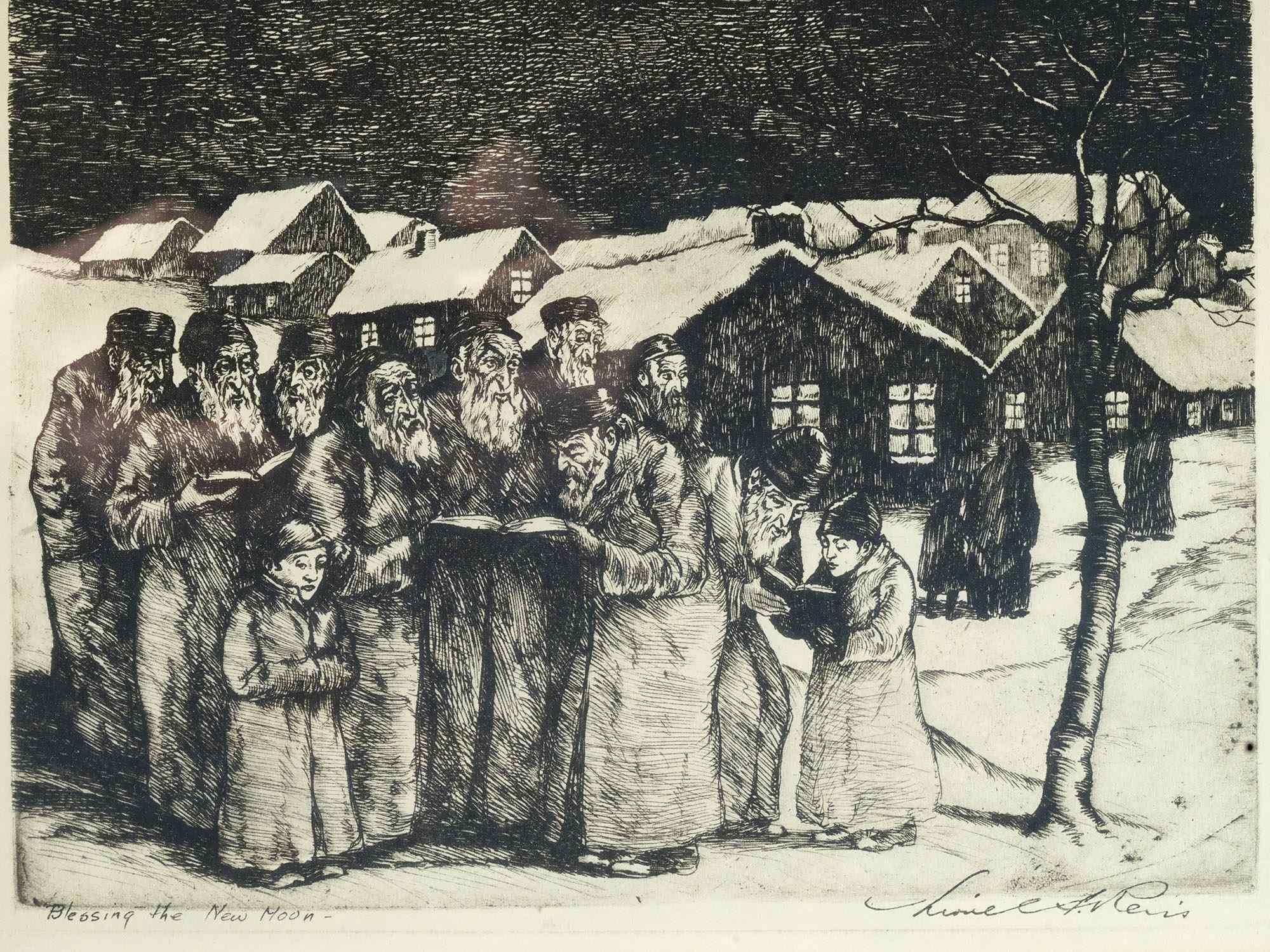
Blessing the New Moon (1922), by Lionel S. Reiss. Etching.

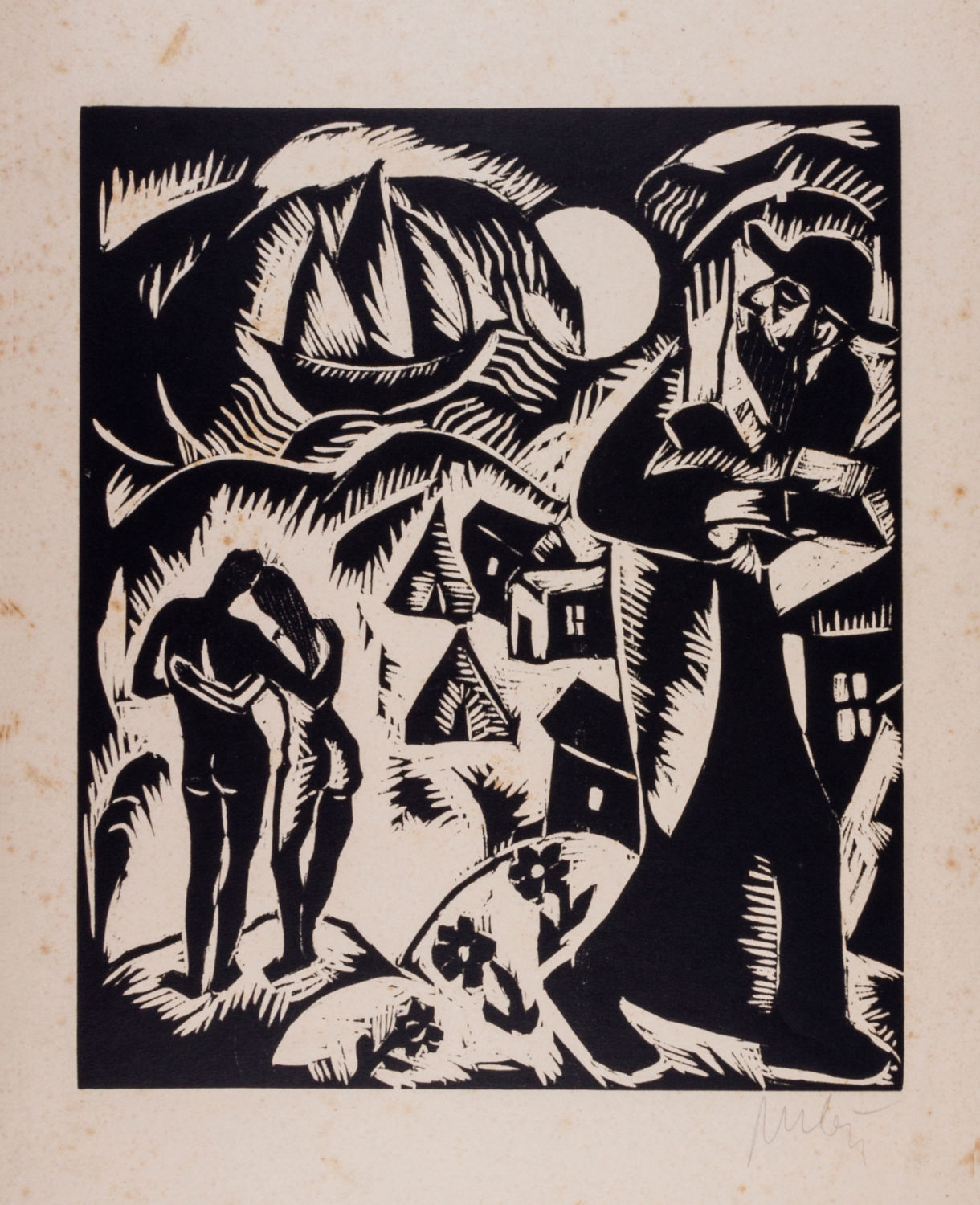
Kiddush levana (1923) by Reuven Rubin. Woodcut.

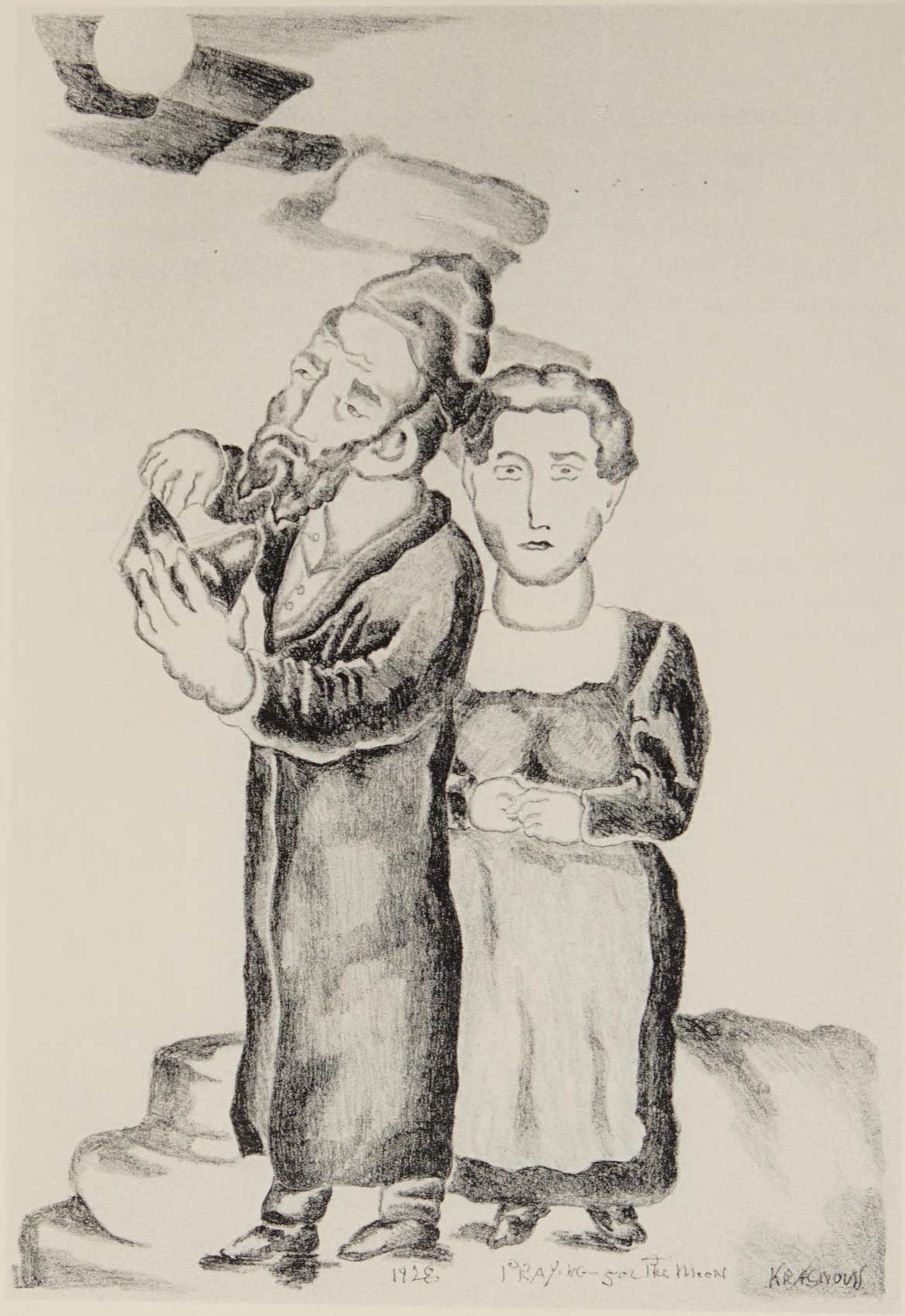
Praying for the Moon (1928), by Peter Krasnow. Lithograph. (Note: Compare Blessing of the New Moon (1883) by Alphonse Levy.)

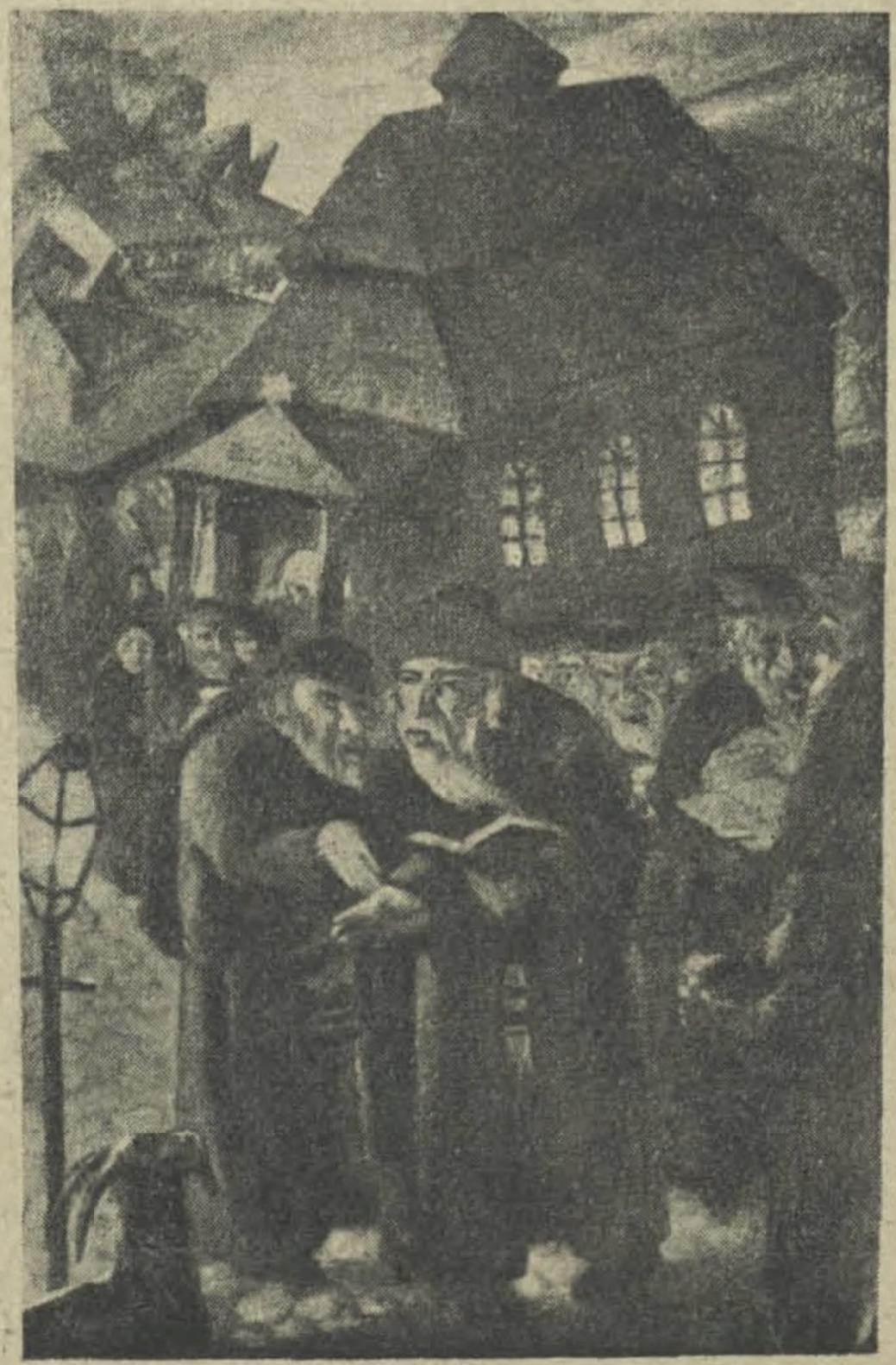
Kiddush levana (1929), by Moshe Appelbaum. Painting.

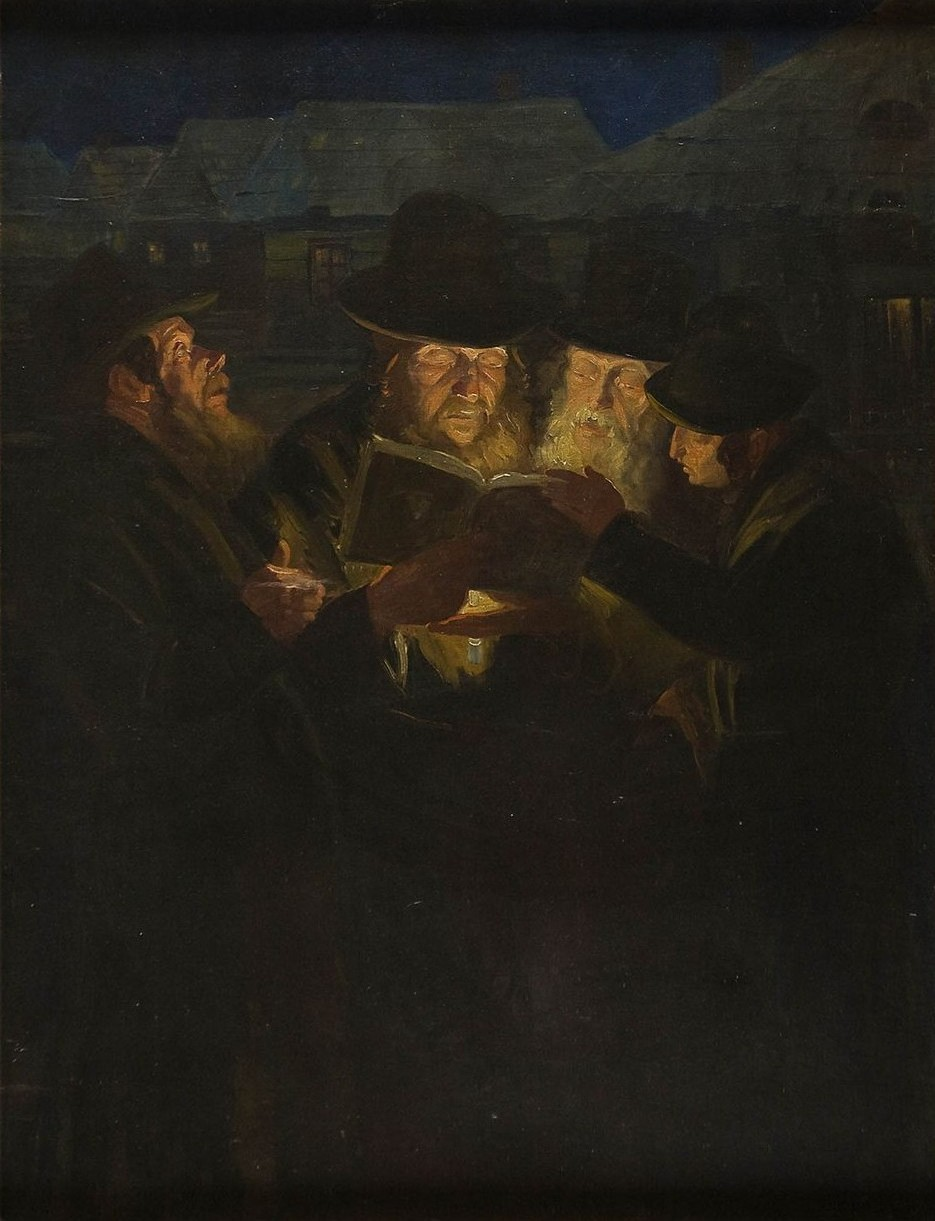
Kiddush levanah (c. 1930). Krakow.

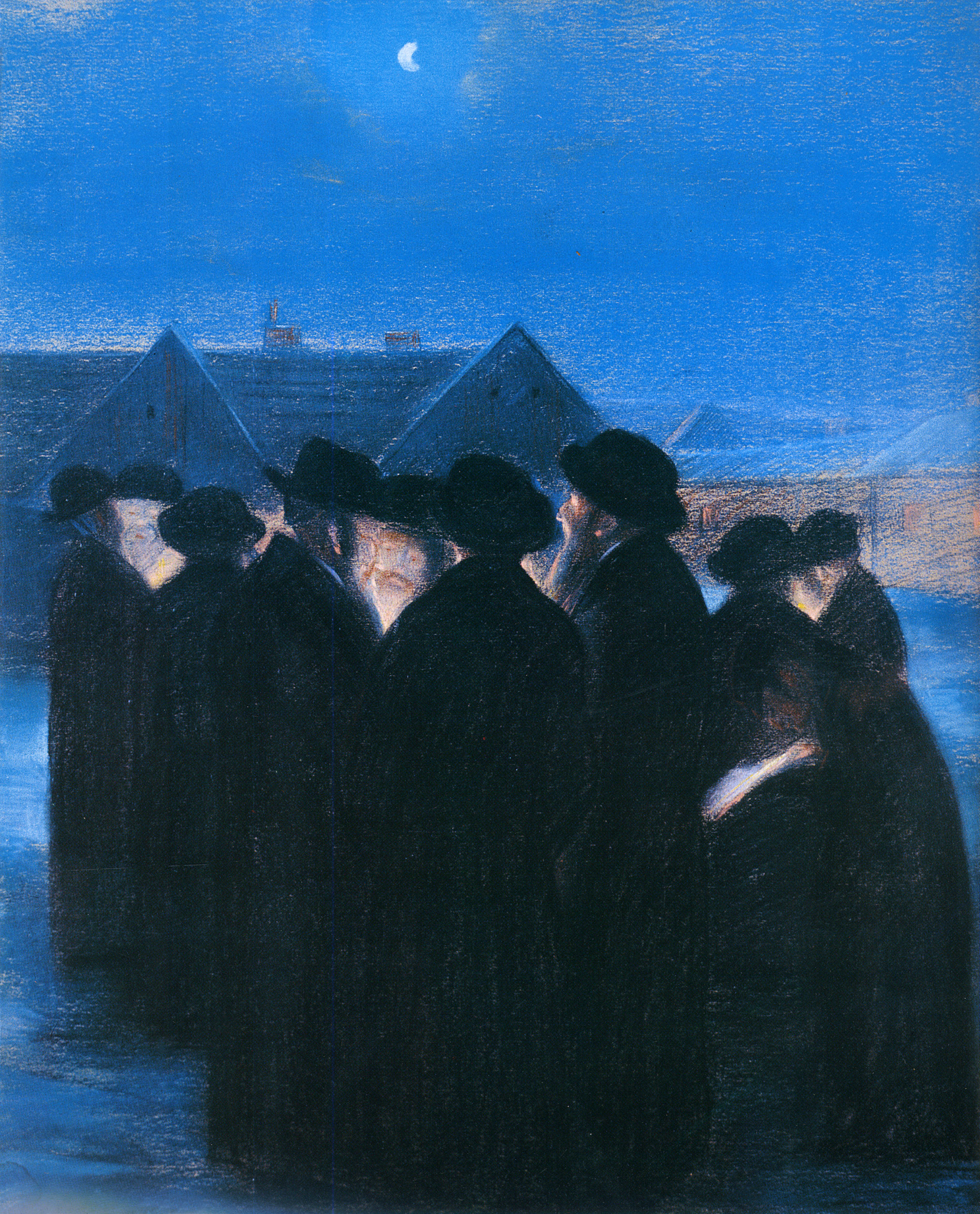
1933, by Artur Markowicz

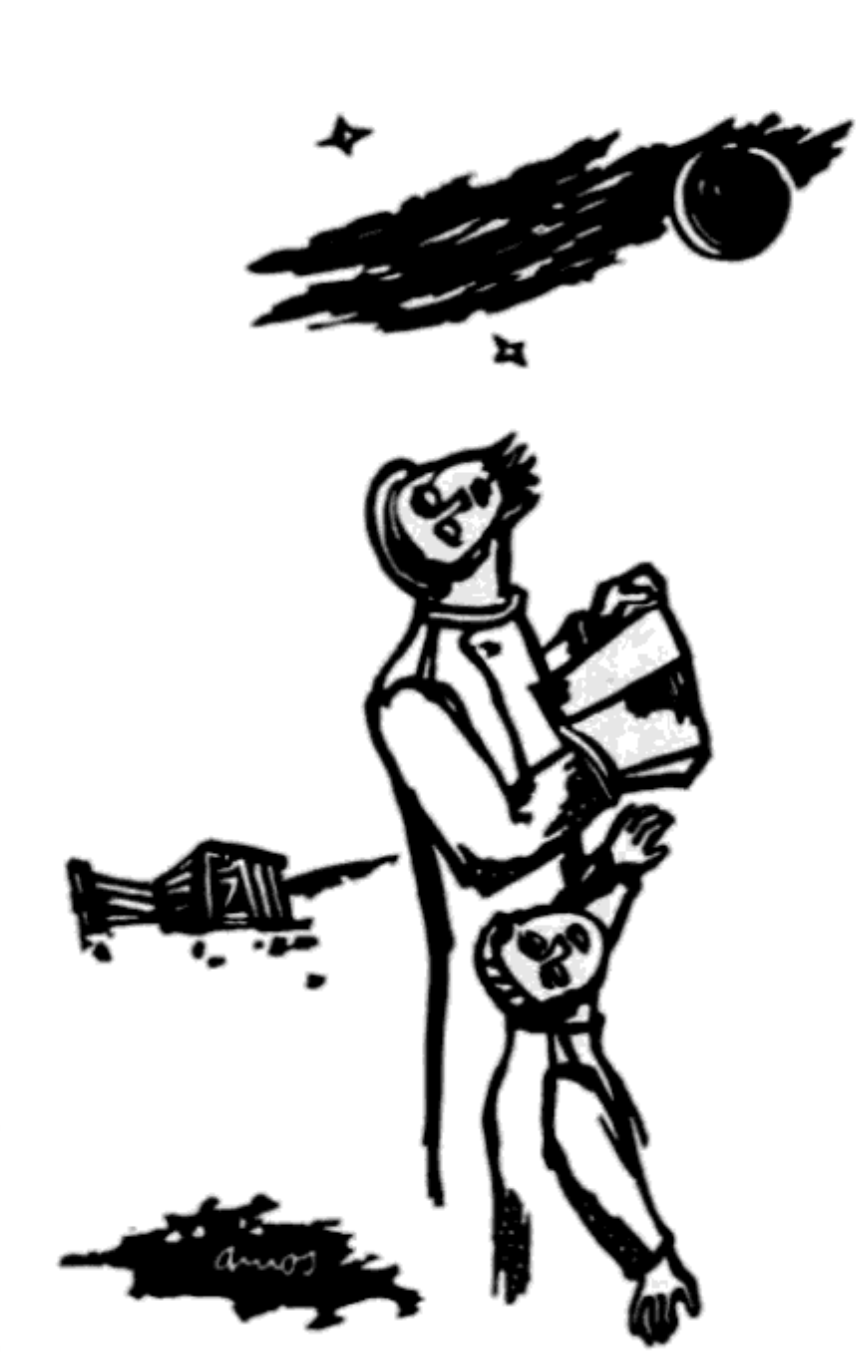
New Moon (1940), by Imre Ámos. Lino-cut. 34 x 27 cm.
