= May 30 (Eastern Orthodox liturgics) =

Day in the Eastern Orthodox liturgical calendar

Eastern Orthodox liturgical calendar
May 29	May 30	May 31
May 30 O.S. ≍ June 12 N.S. May 30 N.S ≍ May 17 O.S.

An Eastern Orthodox cross

May 30 in Eastern Orthodox liturgical calendars is a feast day and a day of commemoration of saints and martyrs. Although some Orthodox churches use the Revised Julian Calendar and others use the traditional Julian calendar, the fixed commemorations for their respective May 30 are broadly the same, no matter which calendar is used. (Note: Despite the dates being the same, the days to which they refer typically differ by 13 days. The notation Old Style or O.S. is sometimes used to indicate a date in the traditional Julian Calendar (the "Old Calendar"). The notation New Style or N.S. indicates a date in the Revised Julian calendar (the "New Calendar").)

== Saints ==
- Martyrs Aphrodisius, Agapius, Eusebios, Charalampos and Christina, in Nicomedia, by fire (65) (Note: "The Holy Martyrs EUSEBIUS, ROMANUS and MELETIUS (TELETIUS), CHARALAMPUS, CHRISTINA and a crowd of martyrs, burned alive in NICOMEDIA." "We are using here the version in the Synaxarion of Constantinople, which states that their synaxis was held in the Martyrium of St. Euphemia (now Gulcami) in the Petrion quarter near the Golden Horn (Delahaye, p. 717). Nicodemus' Synaxarion commemorates Romanus and Teletius separately on this day, and Eusebius and Charalampus on the 31st.") (see also April 28 - West. (Note: "[Roman, Gallican and Spanish Martyrologies. Ado, Usuardus, and Notker.]": "S. APHRODISIUS and his companions have met with a very remarkable fate. The Martyrologies mention Aphrodisius, Carilippus, Agapitus, Eusebius, Malina, and others, as martyrs, and some add, at Tarsus, in Cilicia. But at Béziers, in France, S. Aphrodisius is venerated on this day as the first bishop of the see; and a strange story is told of him. He is said to have been an Egyptian, who received SS. Mary, Joseph, and the infant Saviour, into his house on the occasion of the flight into Egypt. And when he heard of the miracles and death and resurrection of Christ, he was converted, and went and joined himself to the Apostles, and received the Holy Ghost along with them on the day of Pentecost. Then he was appointed bishop under S. Peter, and travelled with him. Afterwards he went with Sergius Paulus to Gaul; Sergius Paulus became first bishop of Narbonne, and Aphrodisius first bishop of Beziers, by the appointment of S. Paul, the apostle of the Gentiles. And there he suffered martyrdom with his companions, Carilippus, or Ciryppius, Agapius and Eusebius.; But as Henschenius has shewn, this story is made up of scraps of legendary matter from various sources, of absolutely no authority. This is not all. On the strength of the place of martyrdom of these saints not being inserted in some Martyrologies, the forger of the Chronicle of Flavius Dexter in the 16th cent. set them all down as having suffered at Capana, in Portugal, in the year 76. Relying on the impudent forgery of Higuera, in 1651, De Arze Reynoso, B. of Plasencia, in whose diocese Capana was, obtained authority from the Holy See to solemnize the festival of these saints, as a double with proper office, and indulgences for forty days to all who should assist at the offices, and pray for the extirpation of heresy and peace between Christian princes. S. Aphrodisius is represented at Bourges with his head in his hands."))

- Martyrs Romanos and Meletius (Teletius), in Nicomedia, by the sword.

- Hieromartyr Eutychius, disciple of St. John the Theologian (1st century) (see also August 24)
- Martyr Euplius (Efplos), by being encased in an ox skin and left exposed to the sun.
- Martyr Natalios, by the sword.
- Martyr Barlaam, of Caesarea in Cappadocia (c. 303–305) (Note: "This commemoration may refer to the spiritual teacher of St. Joasaph, cf. 26 Aug.")
- Saint Cyprian of Antioch, reposed in peace.
- Saint Macrina the Elder, grandmother of Saints Macrina, Basil the Great, Naucratius, Peter of Sebaste, and Gregory of Nyssa (340)
- Saint Emmelia of Caesarea, mother of Saint Basil the Great (375) (see also January 1)
- Venerable Isaac the Confessor, founder of the Dalmatian Monastery at Constantinople (383)

== Pre-Schism Western saints ==
- Martyrs Gabinus and Crispulus, at Torres in Sardinia, Protomartyrs of Sardinia (130)
- Pope Saint Felix I, who was the first to condemn the heresy of Paul of Samosata (274)
- Saint Venantius of Gaul, elder brother of St Honoratus of Lérins (374) (Note: After living as hermit on an island near Cannes, both travelled to the East to learn the monastic life. Saint Venantius reposed in peace in Greece.)
- Saint Exuperantius (Esuperantio), Bishop of Ravenna and Confessor (418) (Note: See: (in Italian) Esuperanzio di Ravenna. Wikipedia. (Italian Wikipedia).)
- Saint Madelgisilus (Mauguille), Irish saint, disciple of St Fursey (655) (Note: After some years of monastic life at St Riquier in France, he went to live as a hermit with St Pulgan near Monstrelet.)
- Saint Anastasius of Pavia (680)
- Saint Hubert (Hugbert of Bretigny, Hubert of Maastricht), the "Apostle of the Ardennes", first Bishop of Liège (727) (Note: The story of the stag has been appropriated from the legend of Saint Eustace (a.k.a. Placidus), (September 20).)
- Saint Gamo, monk and then Abbot of Brétigny near Noyon in France (8th century)
- Saint Walstan of Bawburgh, a farm labourer in Taverham and Costessey, remarkable for his charity (1016)

== Post-Schism Orthodox saints ==
- Saint Jacob, monk of Starotorzhok Monastery in Galich, Kostroma (15th-16th century) (Note: See: (in Russian) Иаков Галичский. Википедии. (Russian Wikipedia).)
- Venerables Isaiah and Nikanor of Arkhangelsk (16th-17th century) (Note: The Monks Isaiah and Nikanor of Arkhangelsk were glorified in the exploit of wilderness-dwelling on the banks of the River Rucha in the Arkhangelsk frontier region.)
- Synaxis of the Saints of Penza (2020) (Note: See: (in Russian) Пензенская митрополия. Википедии. (Russian Wikipedia).)

=== New martyrs and confessors ===
- New Hieromartyr Basil Smolensky, Archpriest, of Kholmets, Moscow (1942)

== Other commemorations ==
- Consecration of the Church of St. Euphemia in Dexiokratiana, Constantinople. (Note: This feast is described in Patmos Codex 266.)
- Repose of Abbot Ephraim of Sarov (1778)
- Repose of Hieromonk Benedict (Ghius) of Romania (1990) (Note: See: (in Romanian) Benedict Ghiuș. Wikipedia. (Romanian Wikipedia).)

== Icon gallery ==
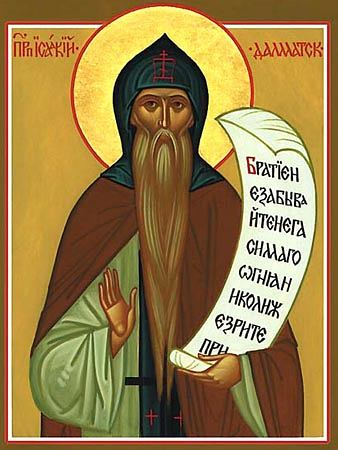
Venerable Isaac the Confessor, founder of the Dalmatian Monastery at Constantinople.

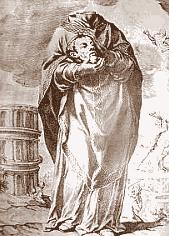
St. Aphrodisius.

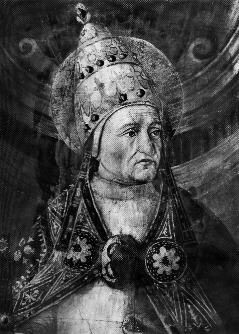
Pope Felix I (269 - 274), Fresco in Sistine Chapel, Vatican.

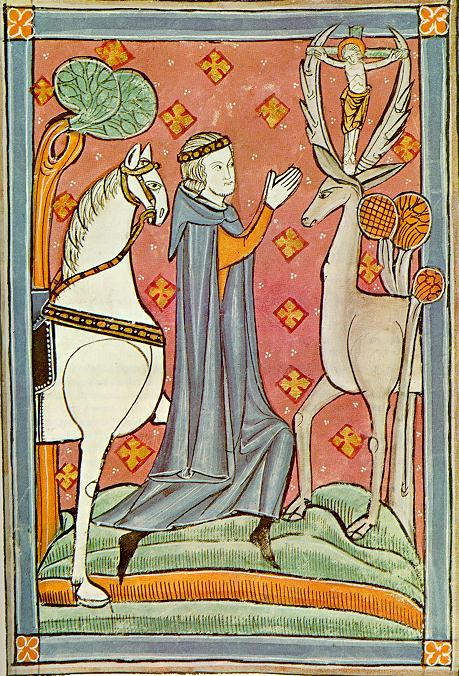
St. Hubert, the "Apostle of the Ardennes", first Bishop of Liège.

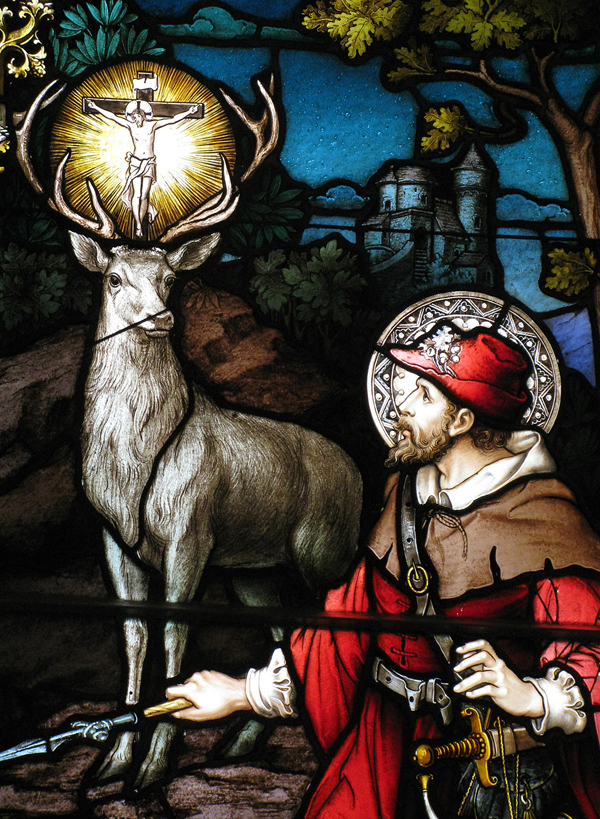
Stained glass window of St. Hubert, with the vision of the crucifix standing between the antlers of the stag or hart he was pursuing.

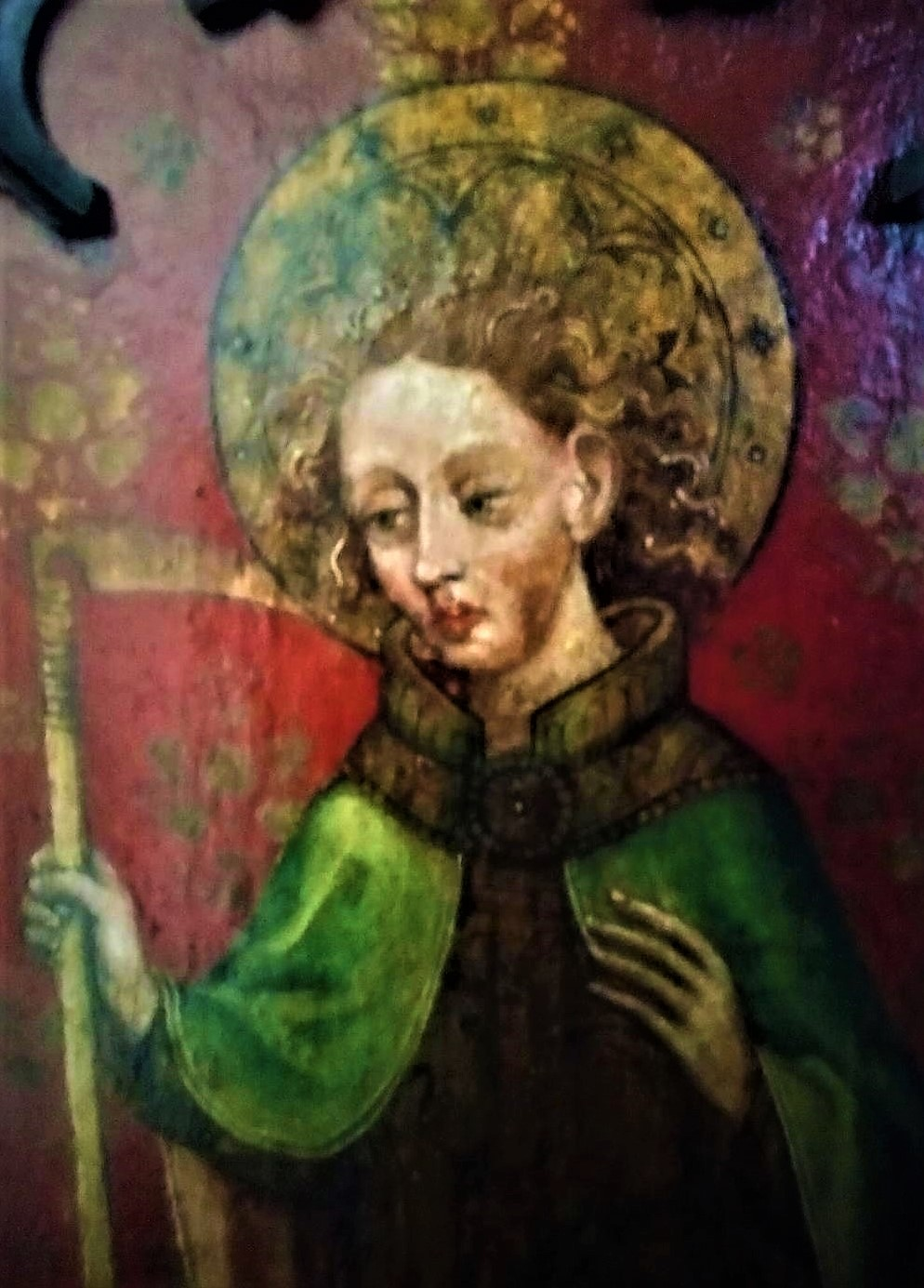
St. Walstan (from a rood screen at St Mary Magdalene, Norwich).

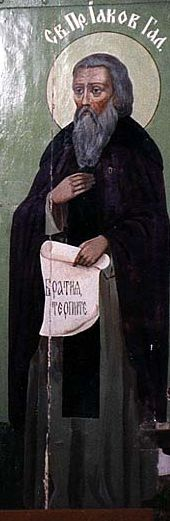
St. Jacob of Starotorzhok, Galich.

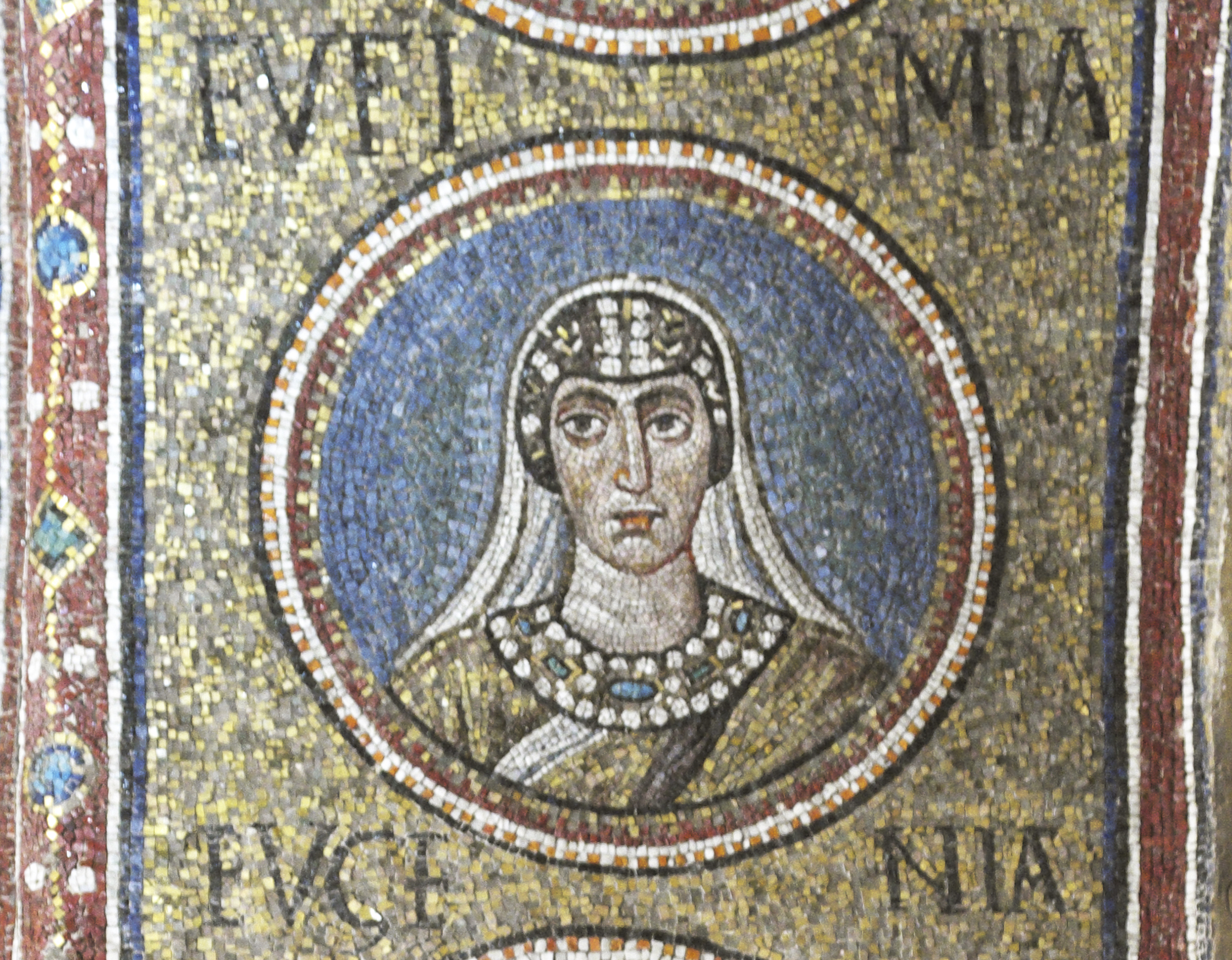
St. Euphemia.

== Sources ==
- May 30/June 12. Orthodox Calendar (ORTHOCHRISTIAN.COM).
- June 12 / May 30. HOLY TRINITY RUSSIAN ORTHODOX CHURCH (A parish of the Patriarchate of Moscow).
- May 30. OCA - The Lives of the Saints.
- May 30. Latin Saints of the Orthodox Patriarchate of Rome.
- May 30. The Roman Martyrology.

Greek Sources

- Great Synaxaristes: (in Greek) 30 ΜΑΪΟΥ. ΜΕΓΑΣ ΣΥΝΑΞΑΡΙΣΤΗΣ.

Russian Sources

- (in Russian) 12 июня (30 мая). Православная Энциклопедия под редакцией Патриарха Московского и всея Руси Кирилла (электронная версия). (Orthodox Encyclopedia - Pravenc.ru).
- (in Russian) 30 мая (ст.ст.) 12 июня 2013 (нов. ст.). Русская Православная Церковь Отдел внешних церковных связей. (DECR).
