= Berengar Fredol =

Berengar Fredol (French: Bérenger Frédol; Latin: Berengarius Fredoli) may refer to:

- Berengar Fredol the Elder (1250–1323), cardinal-bishop of Frascati
- Berengar Fredol the Younger (died 1323), cardinal-bishop of Porto
