= Thomas Carwitham =

British artist and mathematical tool designer

Thomas Carwitham was an English artist known for his drawings of figures falling or flying through the air, and for scenes from Ovid's Metamorphoses. Examples of Carwitham's drawings are in numerous museum collections.

The dates of Carwitham's life are not known; but a sheet of studies of River Gods at the Victoria and Albert Museum, London, is dated 1713. His drawings have sometimes been compared with those by James Thornhill, under whom he may have studied. In 1732 Carwitham married Iphigenia Golding of Hampton, near Twickenham, whose father Edward Golding (1675–1733) was "Keeper of the deer at Hampton Court".

In 1723 Carwitham published a treatise on geometry, titled The description and use of the Architectonick Sector, And also of the Architectonick Sliding Plates in advertisements for which he was said to be a "Painter of Twickenham". Carwitham also designed a technical drawing tool called an architectonic sector, to be used in conjunction with his treatise. An example is in the History of Science Museum at the University of Oxford.

Between 1728 and 1732 Carwitham was employed by John Christopher Le Blon on a scheme to weave tapestry copies of Raphael's Cartoons. However, the enterprise failed and Carwitham took his employers to court in 1733.

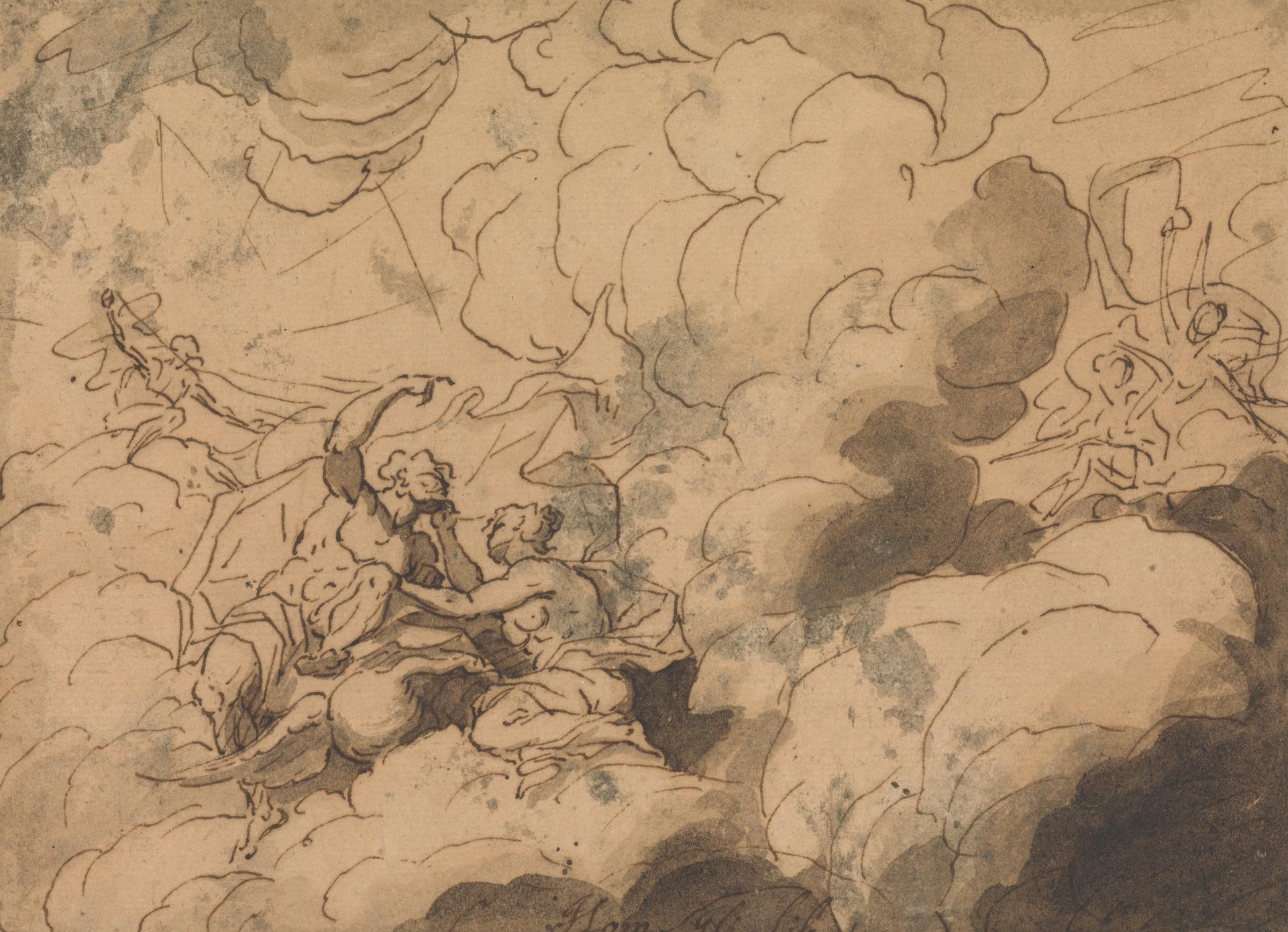
Illustration to Homer's Iliad, circa 1713. Pen and grey ink, grey wash. Yale Center for British Art (B1977.14.5503).

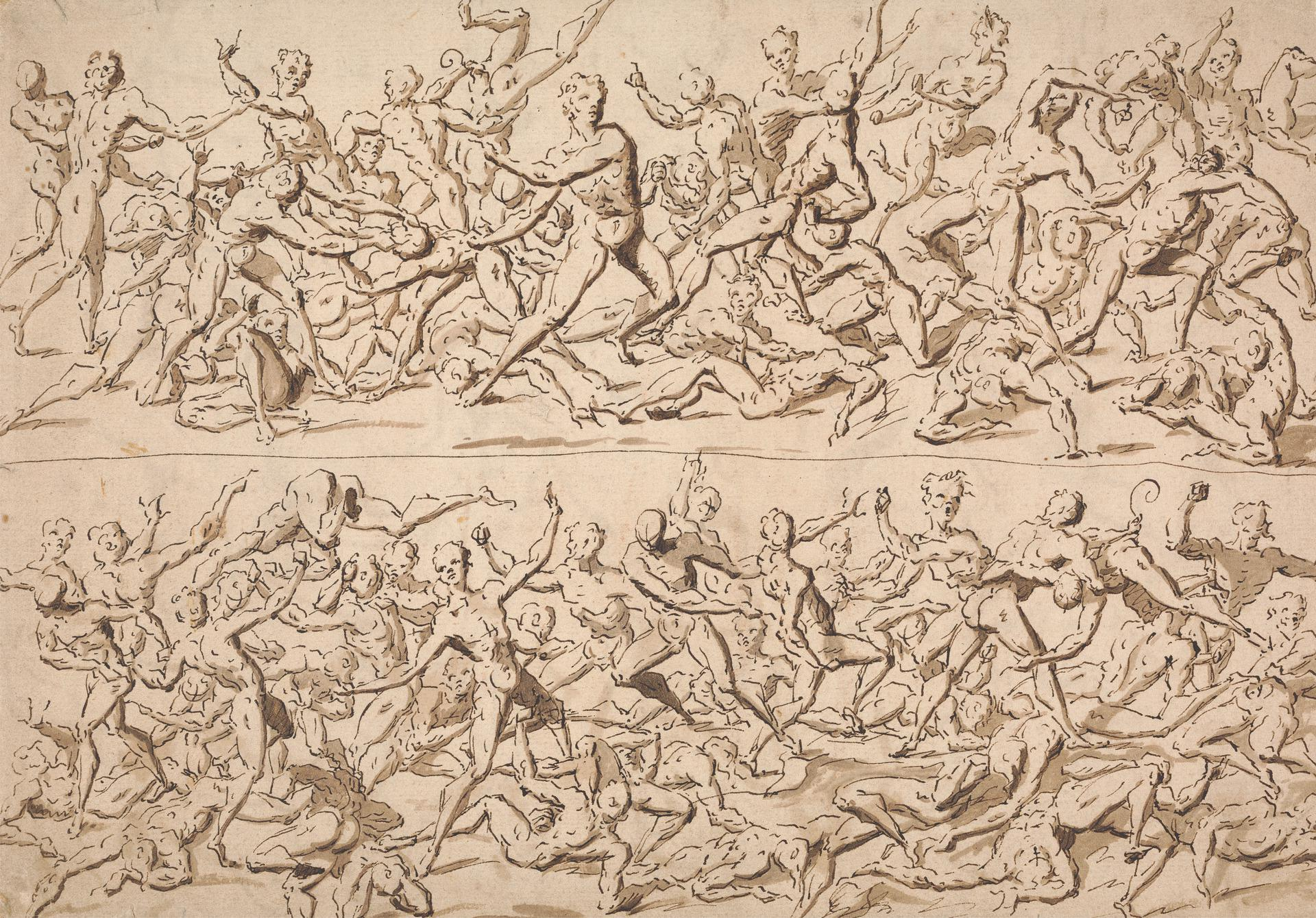
Battle Scene, circa 1713. Pen and grey ink, grey wash. Yale Center for British Art (B1975.4.1055).

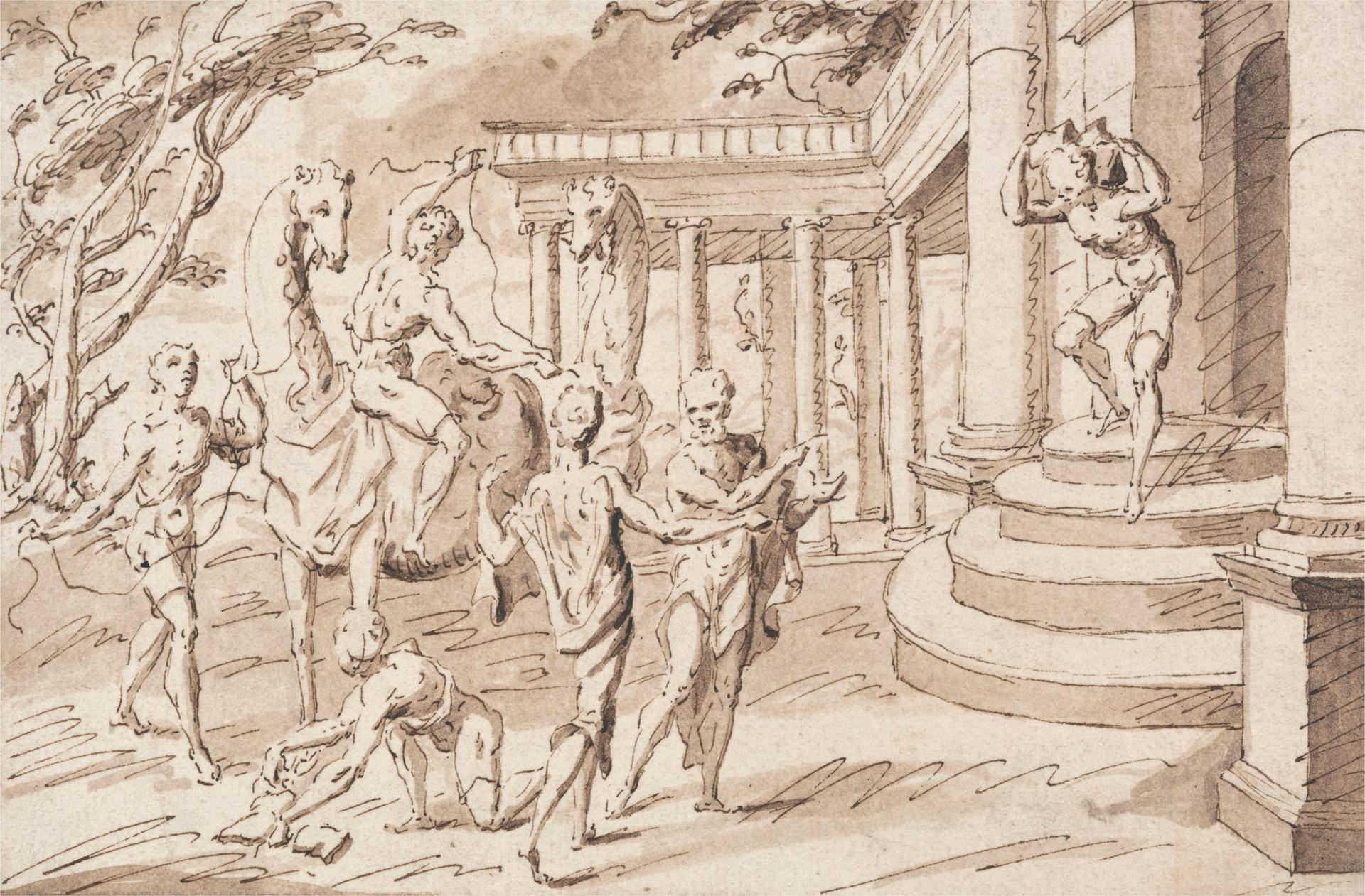
Scene from the Book of Tobit, circa 1713. Pen and grey ink, grey wash. Yale Center for British Art (B2009.9.128).

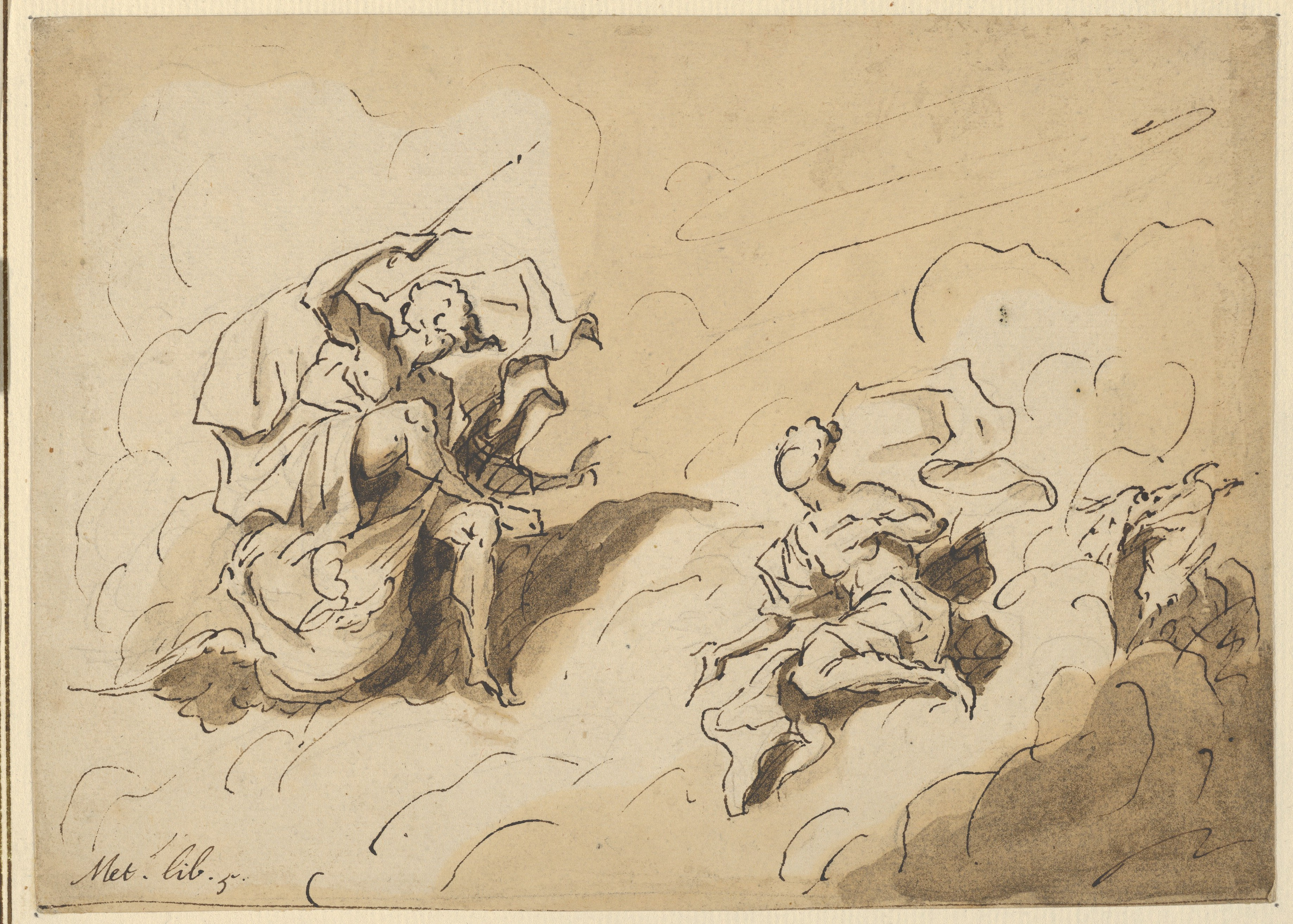
Scene from Metamorphoses Book 5, circa 1713. Pen and grey ink, grey wash. Metropolitan Museum of Art, New York (2014.703.1)

== Collections ==
- Yale Center for British Art (accession no. B1975.4.1055)
- Tate, London (accession no. T08118)
- Princeton University Art Museum (accession no. x.1976-27)
- British Museum, London (Shelfmark 1962,0714.18)
- Metropolitan Museum of Art, New York (accession no. 2014.703.1)
- Huntington Library, San Marino, California (accession no. 63.52.38).
