= Elymas =

Jewish magus depicted in the Acts of the Apostles

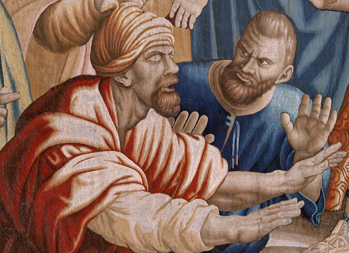
- Elymas Struck Blind (La ceguera de Elymas) (Raphael, 1519)
- Occupation: Sorcerer

Elymas (/ˈɛlɪməs/; Ancient Greek: Ἐλύμας; c. 1st century AD), also known as Bar-Jesus (Ancient Greek: Βαριησοῦς, Imperial Aramaic: Bar-Shuma, Latin: Bariesu), is a figure described in the Acts of the Apostles, chapter 13, where he is referred to as a mágos (μάγος), which the King James Bible translates as "sorcerer" and false prophet (ψευδοπροφήτης).

== In the Bible ==
In Acts 13, Paul the Apostle and Barnabas travel to the city of Paphos in Cyprus, where the Roman Proconsul, Sergius Paulus, wishes to hear them speak about Jesus. Elymas, described as a false prophet and a sorcerer, opposes them, whereupon Paul (who is referred to for the first time by his Roman name) announces that God intends to make Elymas temporarily blind. A cloud of darkness immediately begins blocking his sight; after this, Sergius Paulus is converted to Christianity.

According to The Golden Legend, Elymas later stirred up a riot of Jews and pagans in Salamina (Salamis) against Barnabas, resulting in his death.

=== Name ===
Acts 13:8 says, "Elymas the mágos (for so his name is translated) opposed them". "Elymas" is possibly derived from the Arabic ‘alīm "learned" or "wise", and may be used to translate mágos. Bar-Jesus means "Son of Joshua" or "Son of Jesus" in Aramaic.

== Cultural influence ==
"Elymas the Sorcerer Struck with Blindness" is the title of a famous cartoon by Raphael, which served as the inspiration for woven tapestries in the Vatican.

== See also ==
- Apollonius of Tyana
- John the Baptist
- Simon Magus
