= Pieter van Aelst III =

Flemish tapestry weaver (c. 1495–c. 1560)

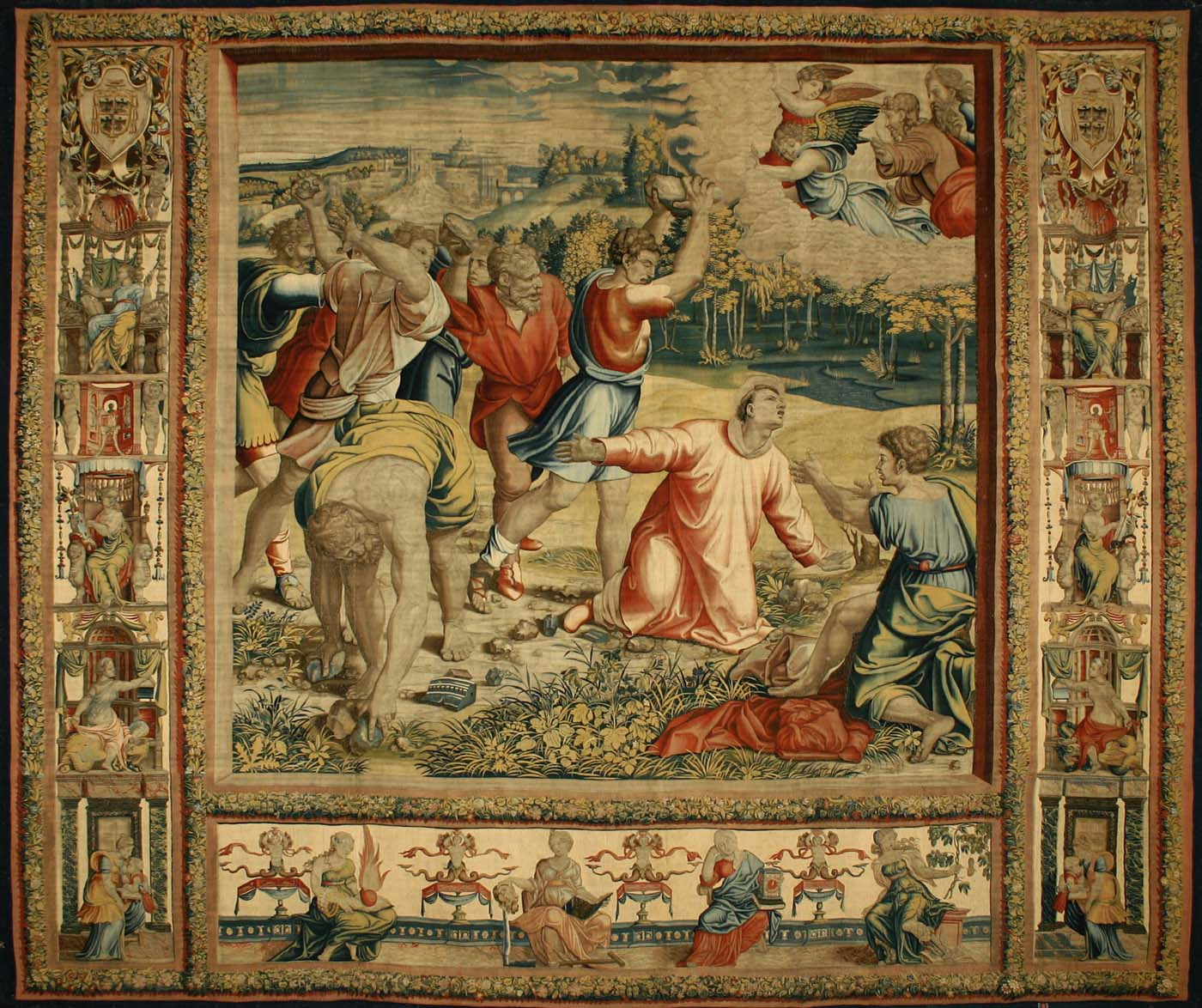
The Stoning of Saint Stephen, from Gonzaga version of the Sistine Chapel tapestries, designed by Raphael, c. 1519

Pieter van Aelst or Pieter van Aelst III (c. 1495 – c. 1560) was a Flemish tapestry weaver whose workshop commenced by his grandfather was one of the leading weavers of Flanders in the first half of the 16th century.

He should not be confused with Pieter Coecke van Aelst (1502-1550), a Flemish painter who was also a significant tapestry designer.

== Life ==
He was likely born around 1495 in Brussels (possibly in Aalst) as the son of Pieter van Edingen van Aelst (also referred to as (Pieter van Aelst the Younger', c. 1450-1533). His father and grandfather were both tapestry weavers. Pieter joined the workshop that his father had set up in Brussels in 1493 and was trained there.

He became the purveyor of tapestries to the Spanish king Charles V, the then ruler of Flanders. This was likely upon the death of Pieter's grandfather Pieter van Aelst I. In 1509 he was mentioned as a restorer of the collection of tapestries of Margaret of Austria, the governor of the Habsburg Netherlands. In 1517 he was paid for tapestries of David and John the Baptist made for the English king Henry VIII.

The most famous set his workshop produced was that designed for the Sistine Chapel in Rome, following the Raphael Cartoons, which now belong to the British Royal Collection but since 1865 have been on loan to the Victoria and Albert Museum in London. The cartoons are designed by the High Renaissance painter Raphael in 1515–16 showing scenes from the Gospels and Acts of the Apostles. The workshop made four further recorded sets over the following decades, for the kings of France, Spain and England, and Cardinal Ercole Gonzaga. These helped the van Aelst workshop gain other important commissions.

A tapestry after Raphael's Bearing of the Cross produced by the van Aelst workshop in 1520 played an important role in the introduction of the Italian Renaissance style in Flanders. In 1520 Pope Leo X commissioned a series of 20 tapestries of Children’s Games and Medici Symbols from van Aelst. The contract required the background of the tapestries to be completely filled with gold. The price of the gold accounted for 14,000 ducats in the total price of 17,600 ducats (i.e. 80%) payable for the series. The series of Children's Games depicted winged spirits with attributes and emblems representing the emblems of the House of Medici and the Pope himself.

In 1547 and 1548 he was still listed as a tapestry maker for the court of Charles V. Around 1550 van Aelst was commissioned by the Polish king Sigismund II Augustus to make a large and lavish work consisting of 18 tapestries representing various episodes in the book of Genesis. These works were made in collaboration with six other Brussels workshops.

As in 1560 his workshop was sold by his heirs to the prominent Brussels weaver Willem de Pannemaker, it is likely that he died not long before.

== Work ==
The mark 'pva' of his workshop appears on four tapestry series, which were made in collaboration with others: on five of eight History of Noah tapestries (Wawel Castle, Kraków), on seven of 10 History of Abraham tapestries, after designs from the circle Bernard van Orley (Kunsthistorisches Museum, Vienna), on two of eight History of Odysseus tapestries (Hardwick Hall, Derbys, NT) and on three of six History of Moses tapestries (Legion of Honor museum, San Francisco).
