= Berengar Fredol the Younger =

French bishop

- Cardinal-Bishop of Porto e Santa Rufina
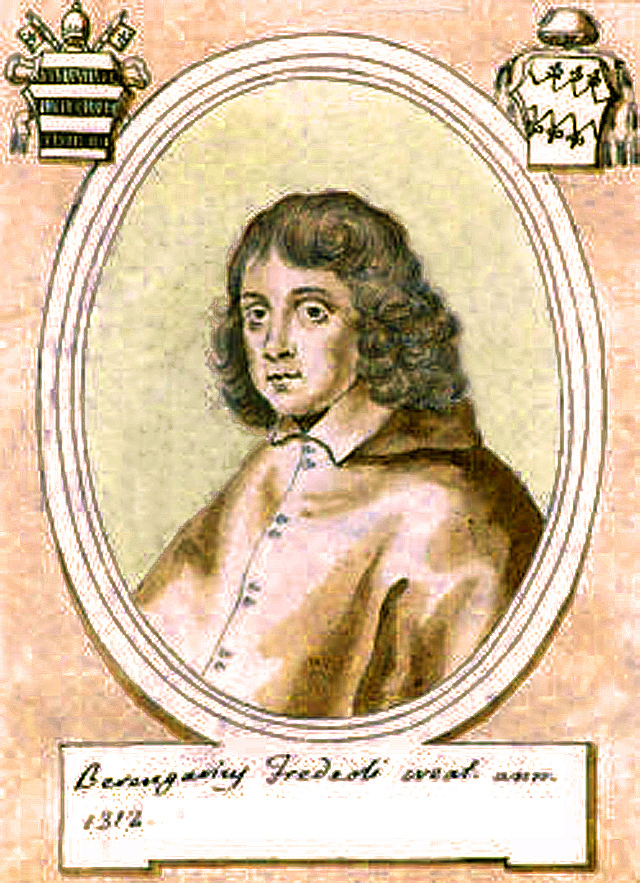
- Berenguer Fredol, was a former Bishop of Béziers.
- Church: Catholic Church
- Diocese: Suburbicarian Diocese of Porto e Santa Rufina
- In office: 22 August 1317 – November 1323
- Predecessor: Bernard de Castanet
- Successor: Pierre d'Arrablay
- Previous posts: Cardinal-Priest of Santi Nereo e Achilleo (1312-1317); Bishop of Béziers (1309-1312)

Orders
- Created cardinal: 23 December 1312 by Pope Clement V

Personal details
- Born: Kingdom of France
- Died: November 1323 Avignon, Comtat Venaissin, Papal States

Berengar Fredol the Younger (died 1323), nephew of Berengar Fredol the Elder, was Bishop of Béziers in 1309, Cardinal-Priest of SS. Nereo e Achilleo in 1312 and Cardinal-Bishop of Porto in 1317. He succeeded his uncle in the post of the dean of the Sacred College in June 1323 and died in Avignon in November of that same year.
