= Aphrodisius =

Egyptian saint

Saint Aphrodisius
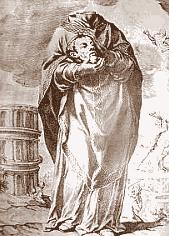
- Born: 25 May 7 AD; Egypt
- Died: traditionally 28 April 65 AD; Béziers
- Venerated in: Roman Catholic Church; Eastern Orthodox Church
- Feast: 28 April
- Attributes: Depicted as a cephalophore
- Patronage: his relics were carried in a procession during times of drought or plague.

Aphrodisius (French: Saint Aphrodise, Afrodise, Aphrodyse, Aphrodite) is a saint associated with the diocese of Béziers, in Languedoc, Southern France. According to Gregory of Tours, Aphrodisius was an Egyptian who was martyred in Languedoc along with his followers Caralippus (Caralampus), Agapius, and Eusebius.

== Legend ==
A Christian tradition states that he was a prefect or high priest of Heliopolis who sheltered the Holy Family at Hermopolis when they fled into Egypt.

Aphrodisius learned of the miracles of Jesus from Alexandrian Jews returning from a pilgrimage in Jerusalem. According to Christian legend, Aphrodisius went to Palestine to meet Jesus and became one of his disciples. After the Resurrection, Aphrodisius received the Holy Spirit at Pentecost. He accompanied Sergius Paulus to Provence. They evangelized Narbonensis: Sergius settled in Narbonne. The legend continues that Aphrodisius arrived at Béziers mounted on a camel and became a hermit in a cave near the city. He lived in it a long time before becoming a bishop.

Local traditions assign Aphrodisius as the first Bishop of Béziers and state that he was decapitated by a group of pagans, along with his companions, on the street now known as Place Saint-Cyr, the site of a Roman circus used for gladiators' fights.

Aphrodisius was executed by beheading. The head was kicked into a well, but the water gushed out and the decapitated Aphrodisius picked up his own head, and carried it through the city. Townspeople spilt snails on the road and Aphrodisius stepped on them without breaking one. Several stonemasons began to mock him, calling him a madman. They were miraculously punished by being turned into stones (visitors still point out their seven stone heads on the Rue des Têtes, "the street of the heads").

Aphrodisius left his head at the cave that he had previously occupied. This was a spot on which later stood a chapel dedicated to Saint Peter, later a basilica named after Aphrodisius (Saint-Aphrodise). This martyrdom is supposed to have occurred on 28 April 65 AD, during the reign of Nero.

According to the story, after the death of his master, the camel was taken care of by a compassionate family of potters. When Aphrodisius was recognized as a saint, the city's leaders considered as an honour to take charge of all the expenses associated with the animal's maintenance. They offered it a house at the beginning of a street and this road, after the camel's death, took the name of "rue du Chameau" ("Camel Street"), afterwards rue Malbec. This is considered the origin of the local "fêtes de Caritach" (feasts of charity).

== Historicity ==
According to the Bréviaire de Béziers, during the 14th and 15th centuries, he was presented as bishop and confessor who died of natural causes. It was only during the 16th century that new legends of his beheading were created. At the same time, the legend of the camel was also devised. Aphrodisius was probably a figure of the 3rd century.

There are several saints with the name of Aphrodisius. The old martyrologies bear five saints with this name: the bishop of Béziers; a martyr of Tarsus in Cilicia celebrated on 21 June; another martyr killed in Cilicia with 170 companions on 28 April c. 86 AD; another killed at Scythopolis, honoured on 4 May; and a martyr of Alexandria killed with several companions, honoured on 13 May. There is also a bishop of Hellespont with this name who at the beginning of the 4th century defended the Resurrection against a sect led by a man named Hierax.

The first literary account of the life of Aphrodisius of Béziers is probably that of Ado, the Carolingian author, who introduces the mission of Aphrodisius into the acts of Paul of Narbonne. Gregory of Tours, in his History of Franks, mentions Aphrodisius. The first mention of the sanctuary dedicated to Aphrodisius is made by Usuard, who undertook a voyage in 858 to bring back from Spain relics for his abbey. In his relation of the voyage, he says to us that after "having left Cordoba, he returned by Girona, Narbonne and Béziers, a city famed for its relics of blessed Aphrodisius".

== Veneration ==
There was a custom of leading a camel in the procession at Béziers on the feast of the saint.

The "camel" was actually a mechanical camel of wood with a moving head and jaws, covered with a painted fabric on which the armorial bearings of the city and two inscriptions were inscribed: the Latin ex antiquitate renascor ("I'm reborn from Antiquity") and the local Occitan sen fosso ("we are numerous"). This machine, which did not really resemble a camel, concealed in its sides a few operators who made its head, jaws and teeth move. This camel was utilized during all local, religious, and political festivals.

This mechanical camel was led during the processions by a costumed figure named Papari, who was escorted by other men disguised as wild men of the woods, whose heads were decorated with leaves. They danced to the sound of a bagpipe. Around the camel, herdsmen fought a mock battle.

The camel was burned during the Wars of Religion and again during the French Revolution. The custom was revived in 1803 only to be discontinued during the Revolution of 1830, when it was considered a symbol of feudalism and religious fanaticism. Today, it continues to run through the city's streets during local holidays. The current head dates from the eighteenth century. In the 1970s, it was proposed that the camel be remade to give it a real camel's appearance. However, the townspeople protested and the camel retained its traditional appearance.

The roots of this particular tradition are possibly to be found in the pre-Christian festivities dedicated to Bacchus, imported by the Phocaeans to southern France; Bacchus was sometimes depicted riding a camel.
