= Raphael Cartoons =

Cartoons for tapestries by Raphael

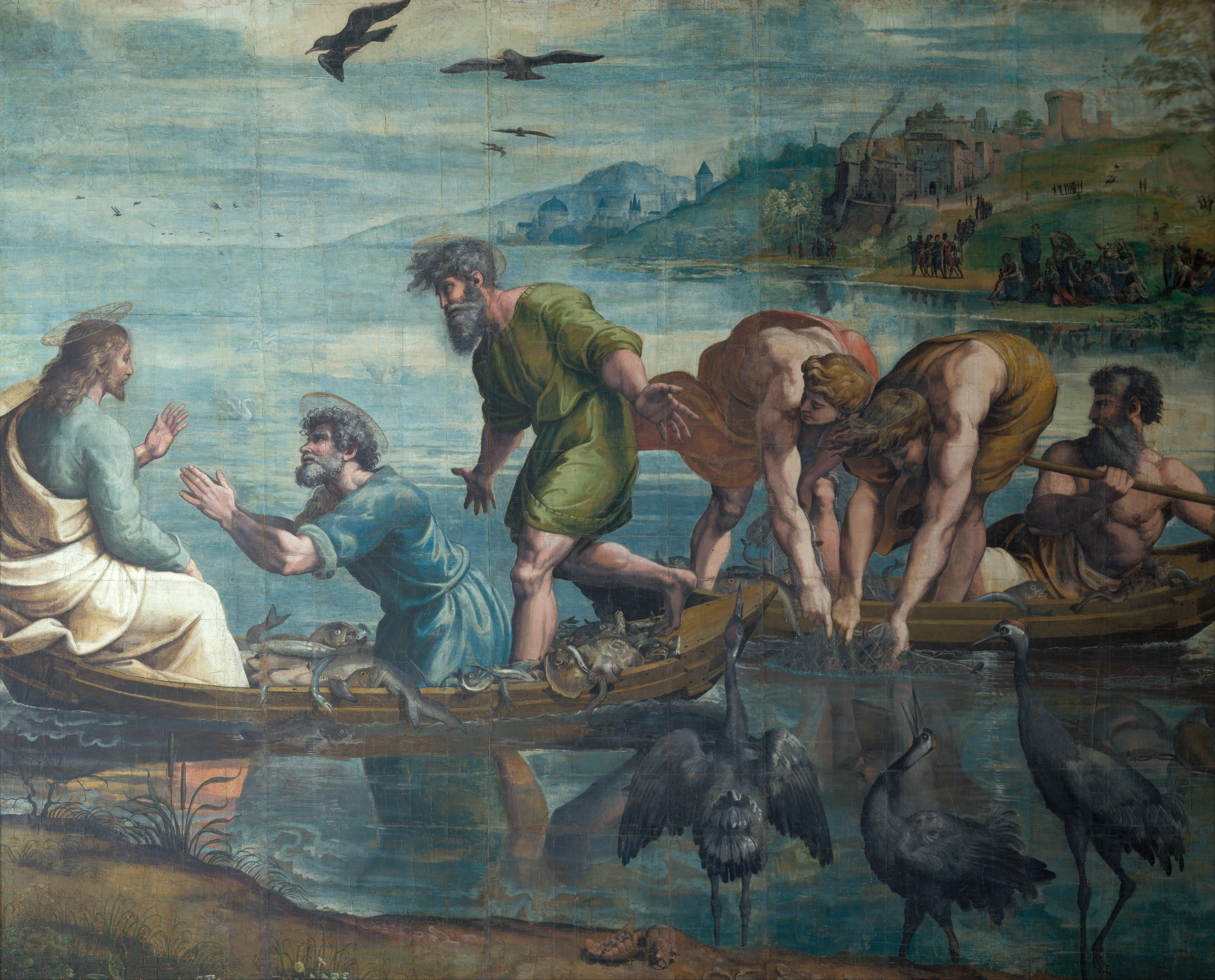
The Miraculous Draught of Fishes

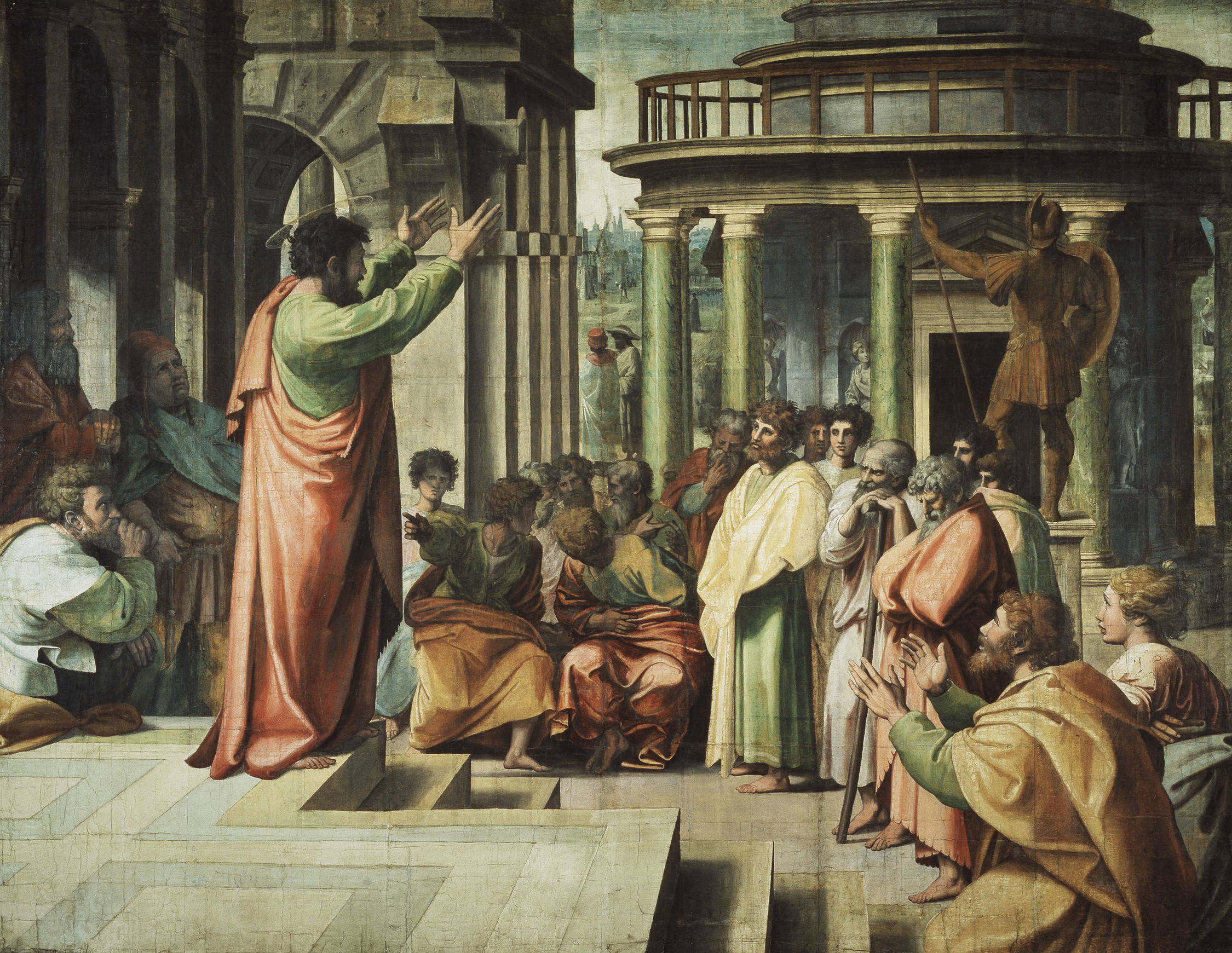
St Paul Preaching in Athens

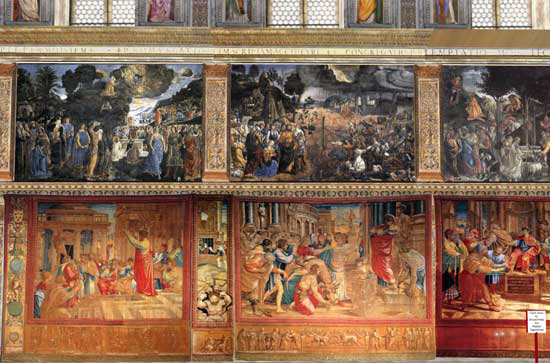
A rare display of the tapestries in the Sistine Chapel, 2011

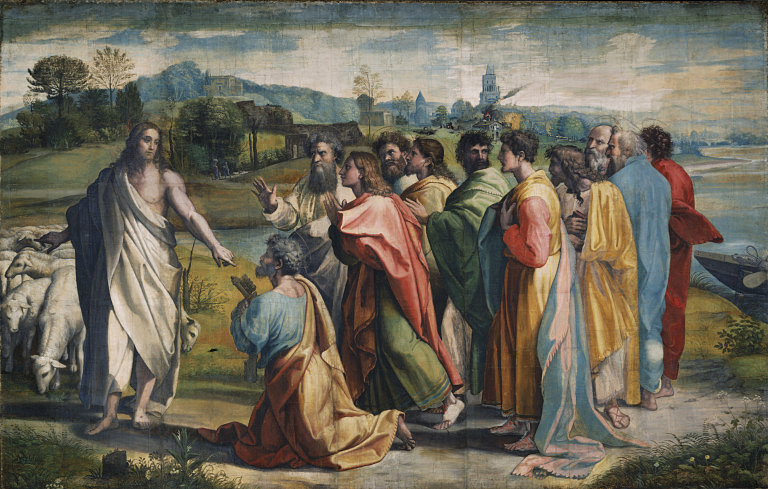
Christ's Charge to Peter

The Raphael Cartoons are seven large modello paintings on paper, designs for tapestries, surviving from a set of ten cartoons, by the High Renaissance painter Raphael in 1515–1516. They were sent from Rome to the weavers in Brussels, who cut them into wide strips and had them beside their looms. The set of tapestries was commissioned by Pope Leo X for the Sistine Chapel in the Vatican Palace in Rome, showing scenes from the Gospels and Acts of the Apostles. They are still hung on special occasions below the frescoes of the Life of Moses and the Life of Christ commissioned by Pope Sixtus IV. The cartoons belong to the British Royal Collection but have been on loan to the Victoria and Albert Museum in London since 1865.

The tapestries rivalled Michelangelo's ceiling as the most famous and influential designs of the Renaissance, and were well known to all artists of the Renaissance and Baroque through reproduction in the form of prints. (Note: Rather oddly, both Jones and Penny and Grove Art say, wrongly, that the V&A have eight of the ten cartoons.) Admiration of them reached its highest pitch in the 18th and 19th centuries; they were described as "the Parthenon sculptures of modern art".

== Commission and the tapestries ==
Raphael was highly conscious that his work would be seen beneath the Sistine Chapel ceiling, which had been finished by Michelangelo only two years before, and took great care perfecting his designs, which are among his largest and most complicated. Originally the set was intended to include 16 tapestries. Raphael was paid twice by Leo, in June 1515 and December 1516, the last payment apparently being upon completion of the work. Tapestries retained their Late Gothic prestige during the Renaissance. Raphael was paid a total of 1,000 ducats. Most of the expense was in the manufacture, with the creation of the tapestries in Brussels costing 15,000 ducats.

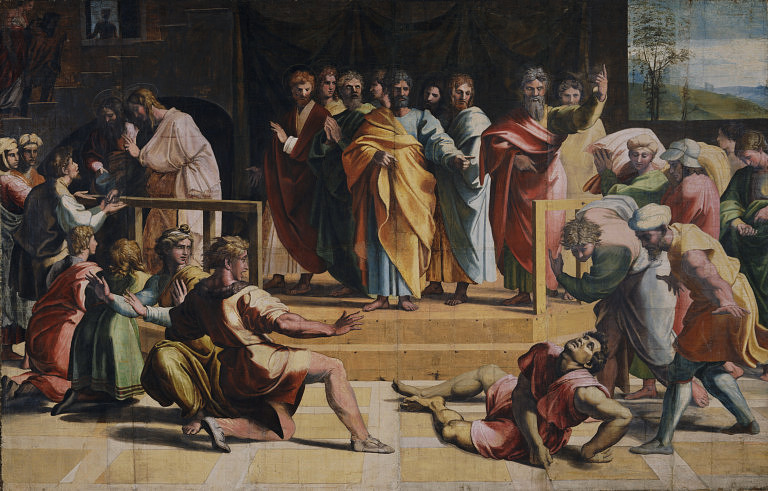
The Death of Ananias

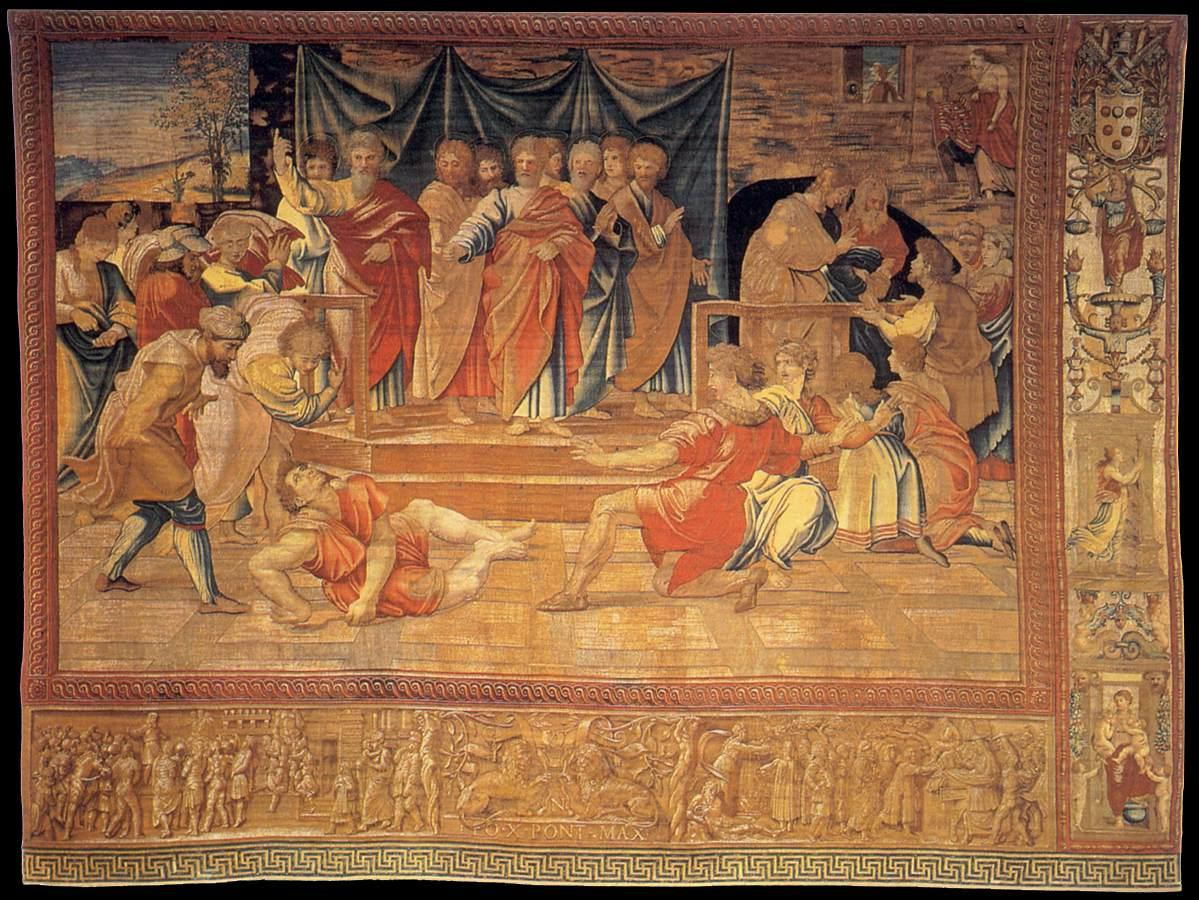
The same scene in the Vatican tapestry

Raphael knew that the final product of his work would be produced by craftsmen rendering his design in another medium; his efforts are therefore entirely concentrated on strong compositions and broad effects, rather than felicitous handling or detail. It was partly this that made the designs so effective when later reproduced in reduced print versions. The cartoons are painted in a glue distemper medium on many sheets of paper glued together (as can be seen in the full-size illustrations). They are now mounted on a canvas backing and are in general in very good condition apart from some fading of the colours.

The cartoons are all slightly over 3 m (9 feet 10 inches) tall, and from 3 to 5 m (9 feet 10 inches to 16 feet 5 inches) wide, with the figures being over-lifesize. The cartoons are mirror-images of the finished tapestries, which were worked from behind. Raphael's workshop would have assisted in the completion of the cartoons which were finished with great care. The cartoons show a much greater range of colours and more subtle gradation than could be reproduced in a tapestry. (Note: V&A website on the colouring. Wölfflin 1968, p. 108 believed they were entirely executed by Penni, one of Raphael's studio, but Jones and Penny and most writers now believe Raphael did much of the painting himself.) Some small preparatory drawings also survive: one for The Conversion of the Proconsul is also in the Royal Collection, and the Getty Museum in Malibu has a figure study of St Paul Rending His Garments. There would have been other drawings for all the subjects, which have been lost; it was from these that the first prints were made.

The tapestries had very wide and elaborate borders, also designed by Raphael, which these cartoons omit; presumably they had their own cartoons. Some of the side borders are separate pieces. The borders included ornamentation in an imitation of Ancient Roman relief sculpture and carved porphyry, as well as scenes from the life of Leo. They were themselves very influential, and sometimes used for other tapestries.

The cartoons were probably completed in 1516 and were then sent to Brussels, where the Vatican tapestries were woven by the workshop of Pieter van Aelst. The first delivery was in 1517, and seven were displayed in the chapel for Christmas Day in 1519 (then as now, their display was reserved for special occasions).

The tapestries were partly destroyed in the Sack of Rome in 1527. As they were made with both gold and silver thread, some were burnt by soldiers during the attack to extract the precious metals. The Vatican Museums have acquired tapestries and recreated sections to complete a full set, now usually displayed in a gallery, but sometimes moved to the Sistine Chapel for special occasions. They were displayed in the chapel for a week in February 2020, to mark the 500th anniversary of Raphael's death. Their layout around the chapel is a matter of discussion among scholars, as there is no record of what was originally intended.

The Raphael's cartoons were revered by The Carracci, but the great period of their influence began with Nicolas Poussin, who borrowed heavily from them and "indeed exaggerated Raphael's style; or rather concentrated it, for he was working on a much smaller scale". Thereafter they remained the touchstone of one approach to history painting until at least the early 19th century – the Raphael whose influence the Pre-Raphaelites wanted to reject was perhaps above all the Raphael of the cartoons.

== Subjects ==
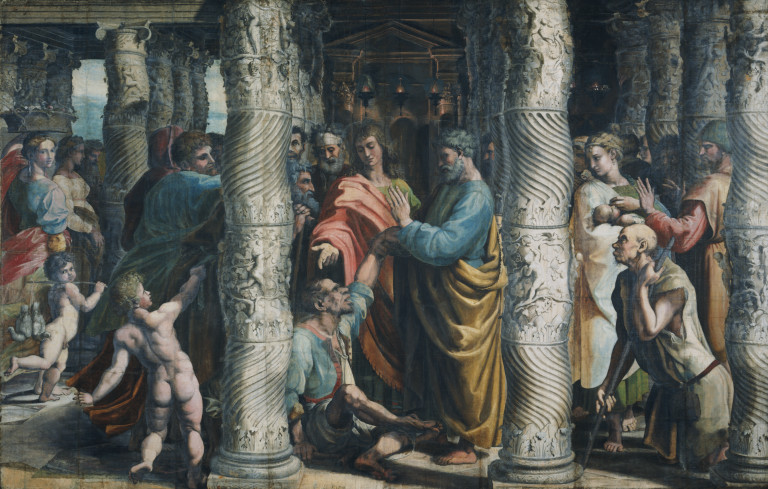
The Healing of the Lame Man

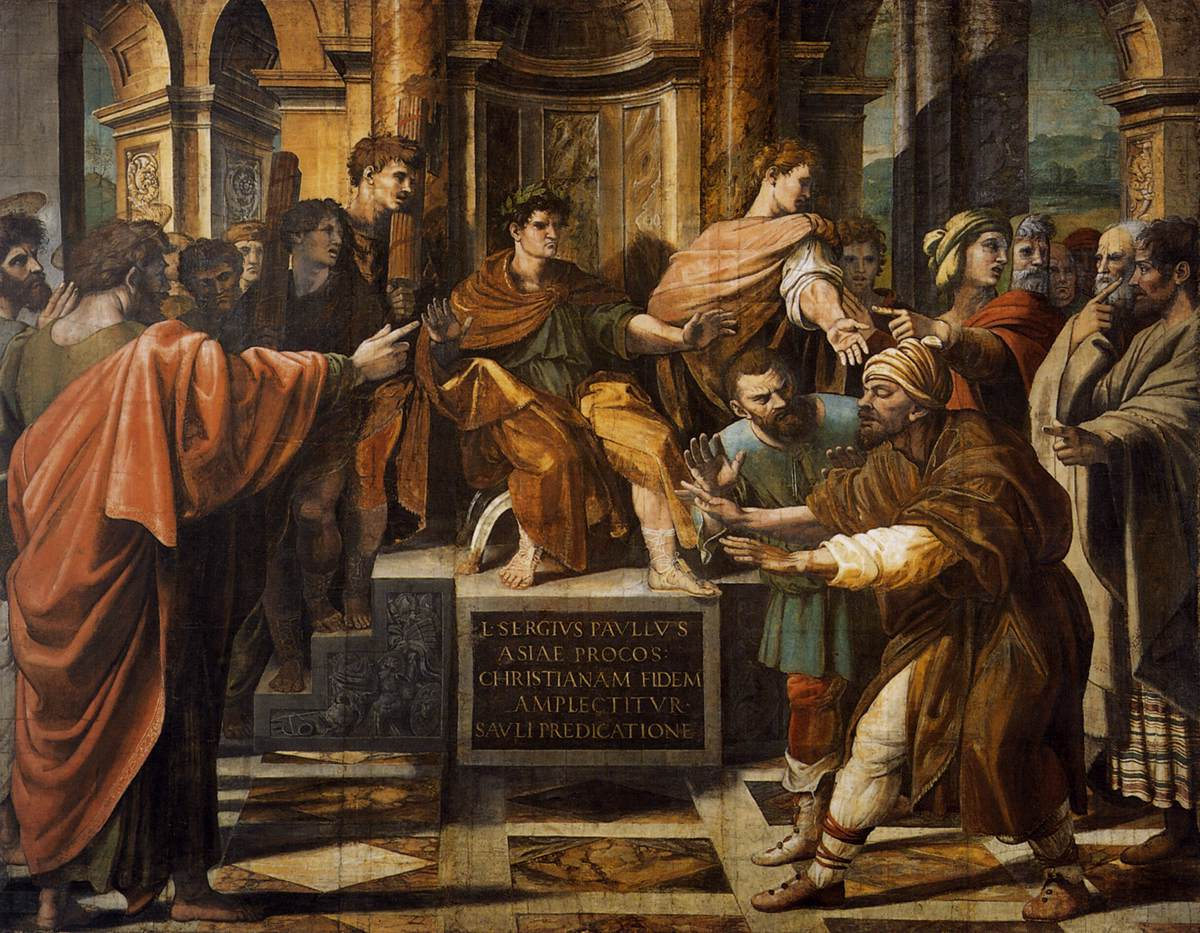
The Conversion of the Proconsul

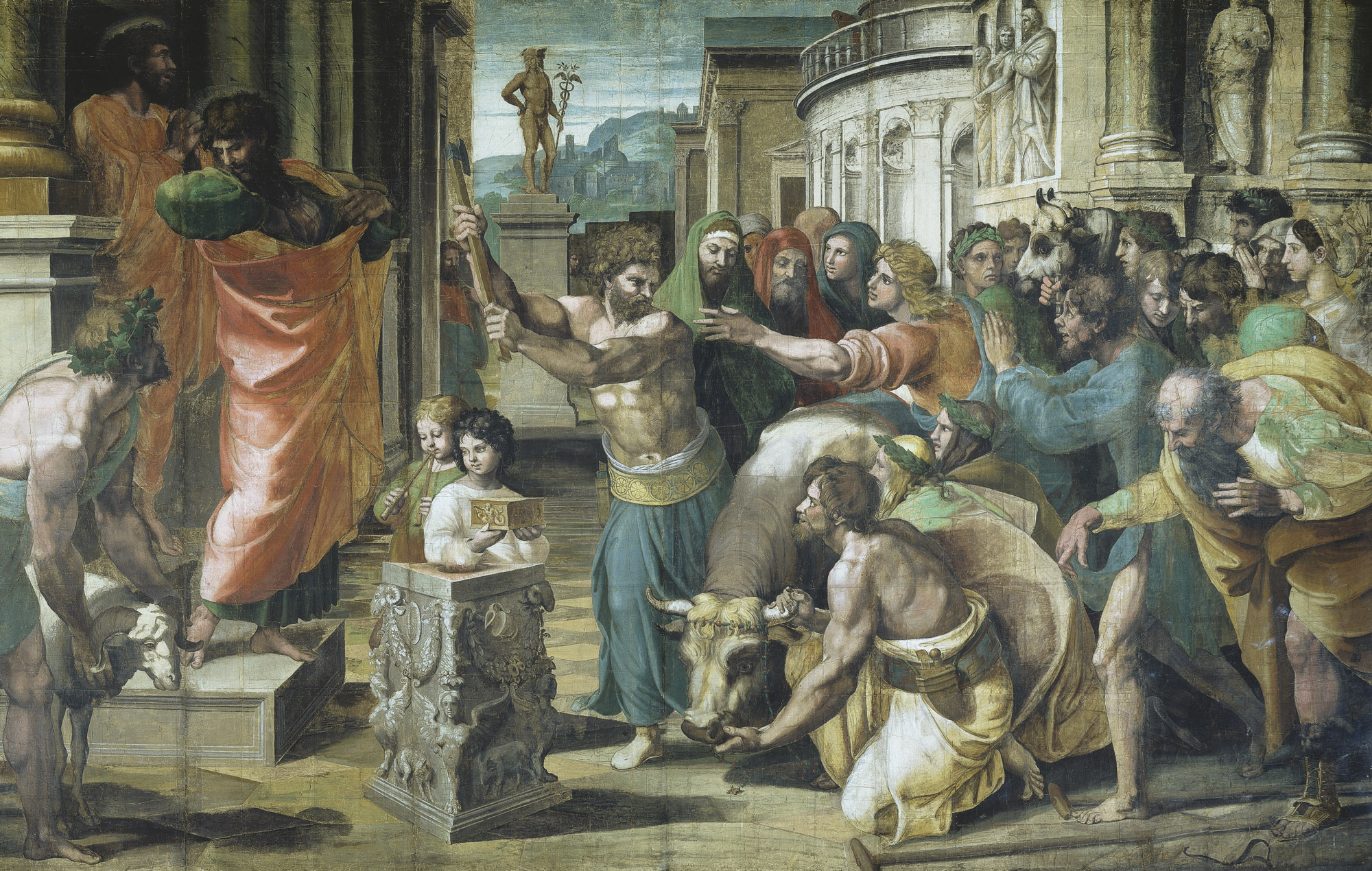
The Sacrifice at Lystra

The Raphael Cartoons represent scenes from the lives of Saints Peter and Paul. As was usual, the completed tapestries reverse are a mirror image of the cartoon designs. The programme emphasised a number of points relevant to contemporary controversies in the period just before the Protestant Reformation, but especially the entrusting of the Church to Saint Peter, the founder of the papacy. There were relatively few precedents for these subjects, so Raphael was less constrained by traditional iconographic expectations than he would have been with a series on the life of Christ or Mary. He no doubt received some advice or instructions in choosing the scenes to depict. The scenes from the Life of Peter were designed to hang below the frescoes of the Life of Christ by Perugino and others in the middle register of the chapel; opposite them, the Life of Saint Paul was to hang below the Life of Moses in fresco. An intervening small frieze showed subjects from the life of Leo, also designed to complement the other series. Each sequence begins at the altar wall, with the Life of Peter on the right side of the Chapel and Life of Paul on the left. Including the three subjects with no surviving cartoons, the set contains (the full scriptural quotations and a commentary are on the V&A website):

=== Life of Peter ===
- The Miraculous Draught of Fishes (Luke 5:1–11)
- Christ's Charge to Peter (Matthew 16:16–19) The key moment in the Gospels for the claims of the Papacy
- The Healing of the Lame Man (Acts 3:1–8)
- The Death of Ananias (Acts 5:1–10)

=== Life of Paul ===
- The Stoning of St Stephen (no cartoon) at which Paul (Saul) was present before his conversion.
- The Conversion of Saint Paul (no cartoon (Note: For the tapestry, see: The Conversion of Saul, Met Museum))
- The Conversion of the Proconsul or The Blinding of Elymas (Acts 13:6–12). Paul had been invited to preach to the Roman proconsul of Paphos, Sergius Paulus, but is heckled by Elymas, a "magus", whom Paul miraculously causes to go temporarily blind, thus converting the proconsul.
- The Sacrifice at Lystra (Acts 14:8). After Paul miraculously cures a cripple, the people of Lystra see him and his companion Barnabas (both standing left) as gods, and want to make a sacrifice to them. Paul tears his garments in disgust, whilst Barnabas speaks to the crowd, persuading the young man at centre to restrain the man with the sacrificial axe.
- St Paul in prison (no cartoon), much smaller than the others, tall and narrow. This is also missing from the later tapestry sets.
- St Paul Preaching in Athens (Acts 17:16–34), the figure standing at the left in a red cap is a portrait of Leo; next to him is Janus Lascaris, a Greek scholar in Rome. The kneeling couple at the right were probably added by Giulio Romano, then an assistant to Raphael.

The subjects missing from the cartoon set

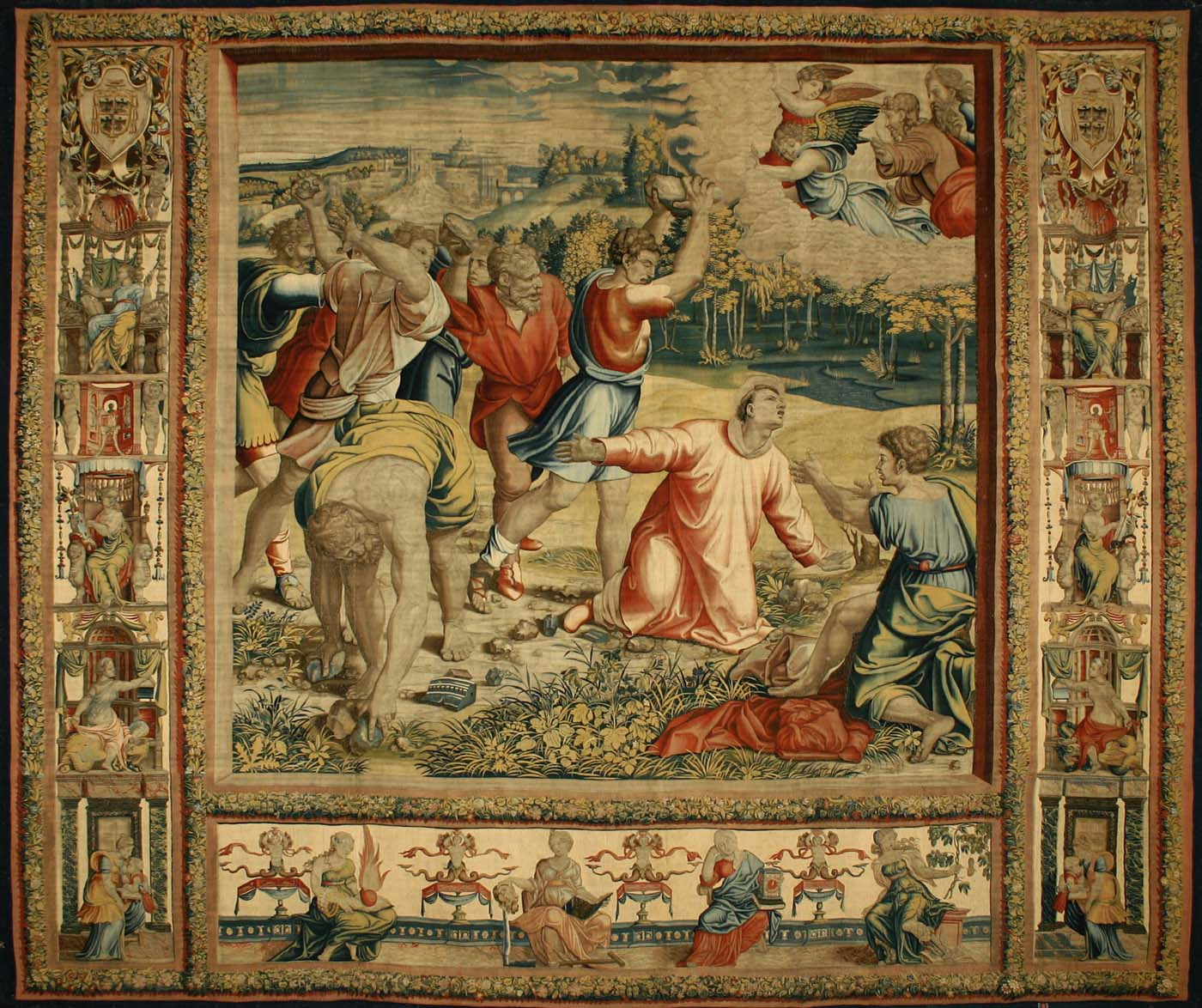
Stoning of Saint Stephen, Mantua

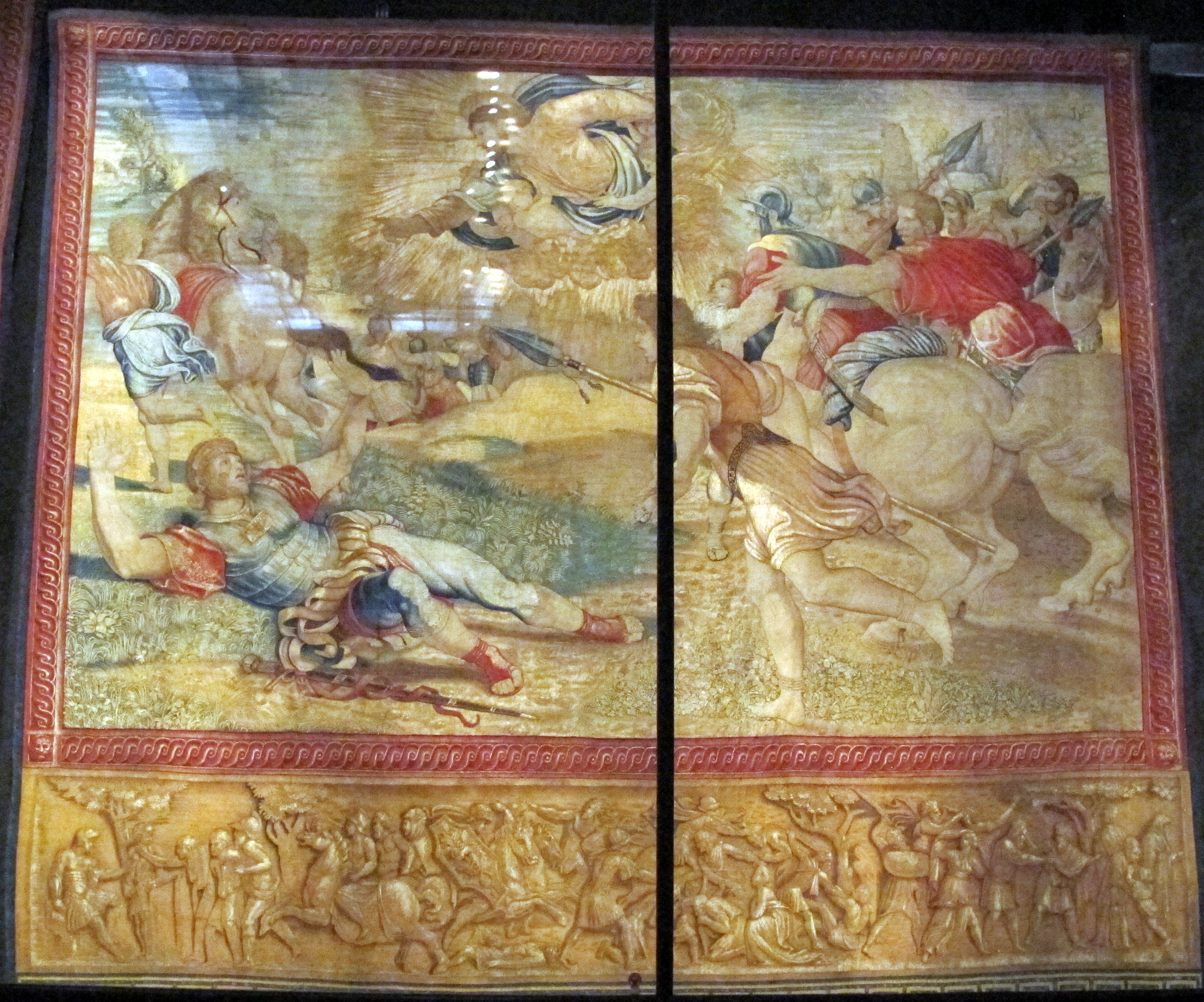
Conversion of Saint Paul, Vatican

St Paul in prison, Vatican

== Tapestry Descriptions ==
=== The Miraculous Draught of Fishes (Luke 5:1–11) ===
This cartoon depicts Christ telling Peter and the Apostles where to cast their net. This resulted in the "miraculous catch." Within the design, Peter is pictured bowing before Christ as if thanking him for the harvest full bounty that was caught. Raphael's exquisite attention to details are shown in this tapestry in how there is a mirror image of the artwork reflected in the water.

=== Christ's Charge to Peter (Matthew 16:16–19) ===
Within this tapestry Raphael combines the two Bible stories of Matthew 16:18–19. Raphael portrays Christ commanding Peter to share the Gospel for him. Christ points at Peter while simultaneously pointing at the sheep. This creates a connection for Peter. He is chosen as the shepherd for the believers. Raphael utilizes foreshortening to help viewers focus on the main images and message of the cartoon. He effortlessly implements chiaroscuro. The use of colors to show different lighting illustrates where the sun is in relation to the characters.

=== The Healing of the Lame Man (Acts 3:1–8) ===
The incredible story of Peter healing the lame man, Acts 3:1–8 is a tapestry within Raphael's Cartoon collection. This miracle illustrates the "spiritual healing of Jesus." Pictured is the lame man sitting and leaning against an intricately detailed column with his arm reaching overhead for Peter to cradle his hand. Raphael's attention to detail is displayed in the lame man's face. The shadowing and tones used create the look of an aged, tired man. The wrinkles in his face and his eyes display the pain he is feeling. The lines used in the creation of his legs and feet define muscular legs and impaired feet. All of this artistic detail reinforces the fact that the lame man spent many years lying and crawling on the ground impaired by his handicap. In contrast, Peter stands clutching his hand while praying over him. The details in Peter's face and expression reinforce his concern. The rendering of the clothing is exceptional. It gives the appearance of creased material that can be felt. Furthermore, the detail of each individual's hair enables the viewer to detect exactly how their hair would appear in person.

=== The Death of Ananias (Acts 5:1–10) ===
Raphael's tapestry expertly illustrates the story of Acts 5:1–10. This could also be named the miracles of Peter. This artwork explains the story of how Peter is capable of punishing and saving others. The Apostles requested that the Christian followers sell their items and tithe the money. During this, Ananias steals from the church by stealing some of the money. When questioned by Peter, Ananias denies any wrongdoing. Ananias drops dead. He was punished for his sins of stealing and lying. Raphael once again applies the skill of chiaroscuro to illustrate this tapestry. His use of tones and shading help place lighting and shadows to specific areas of this artwork. The use of implied lines is demonstrated with the man standing over Ananias pointing to another individual who is pointing up, as if he is pointing to God. This implies that God can help him. The group of men on the right appears concerned with Ananias and wants to help. On the other hand, the men to the left seem frightened.

=== The Conversion of the Proconsul (Acts 13:6–12) ===
This tapestry depicts the story written in Acts 13:6–12. Elymas tries to keep Paul and Barnabas from converting others to Christianity. Elymas suffers temporary blindness for this action. Observing and experiencing this event, leads the proconsul to conversion. Paul's overall goal to convert others to Christianity is illustrated through this tapestry. Raphael utilizes tone and shading to convey different levels of light. He has created a different colored robe for each man. This helps them stand out from the crowd. The different amounts of coating, creates texture throughout the tapestry and images appear more lifelike.

=== The Sacrifice at Lystra (Acts 14:8) ===
Acts 14:8 influenced this tapestry. It represents the story of how Paul and Barnabas were mistaken for the Gods, Mercury and Jupiter, after Paul healed a lame man. The townspeople of Lystra wanted to offer sacrifices to them. Paul was dismayed and proceeded to convince the crowd that they were God's messengers. The foremost character in this scene is a citizen ready to partake in the sacrifice. He wields an axe above his head ready to execute the ox. Raphael's focus on this man's face expresses his determination in the situation. Raphael's use of line, shading and toning reveal his muscular form.

=== St Paul Preaching at Athens (Acts 17:16–34) ===
This tapestry illustrates the story written in Acts 17:16–34. It illustrates Paul preaching to Athens's judicial council. Paul explains Christianity and the importance of knowing God. The viewer can feel Paul's excitement of sharing his message. His arms are stretched out to the crowd, grabbing their attention and welcoming them into the message. Raphael's detail on each individual's face easily reveals their thoughts and feelings regarding Paul. Paul's clothing and the council's clothing include brightly colored robes gracefully wrapped around them. The lines, colors and shading used on the ground give the appearance of a cold marble floor.

== Further sets made in Brussels ==
Cartoons were sometimes returned with tapestries to the commissioner, but this clearly did not happen here, perhaps because of the death of Leo. This allowed four other recorded sets to be made later in Brussels, all of nine tapestries, missing the small Saint Paul in Prison.

One set was bought by Henry VIII of England in 1542. These tapestries were at Westminster Abbey for the coronation of Elizabeth I, and on 14 February 1613 to decorate the chapel of Whitehall Palace for the wedding of Princess Elizabeth and Frederick V of the Palatinate. After being sold in 1649 in the dispersion of the collection of Charles I of England, eventually Henry's set ended up in Berlin, where it was destroyed by a fire at the end of World War II.

King Francis I of France had another of similar date, now lost. The Ducal Palace, Mantua has a set, made in Brussels for Cardinal Ercole Gonzaga in the early 16th century, with the arms of Gonzaga in the borders. Dussler describes these as "in better condition than the series in the Vatican". A set woven around 1550 that joined the Spanish royal collection some time in the following decades now belongs to the Patrimonio Nacional, and is usually hung in the Royal Palace, Madrid.

== In England ==
The seven cartoons now in London were bought from a Genoese collection in 1623 by King Charles I of England, then still Prince of Wales, using agents. He paid only £300 for them, a price that suggests they were regarded as working designs rather than works of art in their own right. Charles had in fact intended to make further tapestries from them at the Mortlake Tapestry Works near London, which he did, with new baroque borders by their designer Francis Cleyn, paying £500 each, but was well aware of their artistic significance. (Note: Charles' original Mortlake set now belongs to the French Government) They had been cut into long vertical strips a yard wide, as was required for use on low-warp tapestry looms, and were only permanently rejoined in the 1690s at Hampton Court. In Charles' day these were stored in wooden boxes in the Banqueting House, Whitehall. They were one of the few items in the Royal Collection withheld from sale by Oliver Cromwell after Charles' execution. The fate of the other three cartoons from the set is unknown; that for the Conversion of Saint Paul was recorded in the collection of Cardinal Grimani in Venice in 1521, and of his heir in 1526.

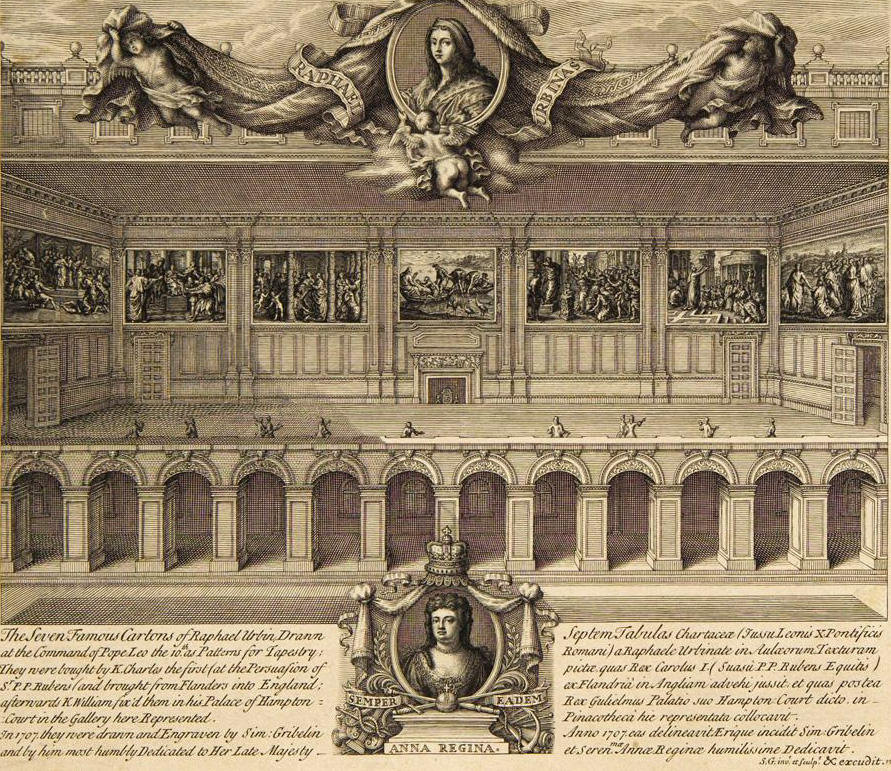
Engraving of the Cartoon Gallery at Hampton Court Palace in 1720 by Simon Gribelin

William III commissioned Sir Christopher Wren and William Talman to design the "Cartoon Gallery" at Hampton Court Palace in 1699, specially to contain them. By this date, the prestige of tapestries in general was beginning to wane, and those of the early sets that had survived were probably already rather faded and dirty. From this point on, the cartoons became regarded as the most authentic and attractive expression of Raphael's conceptions. European taste had also moved in their favour; their dignified classicism was very much in tune with a movement away from the more frenzied versions of the Baroque. The fame of the cartoons, as opposed to the designs in general, grew rapidly.

In 1763, when George III moved them to the newly bought Buckingham House (now Buckingham Palace) there were protests in Parliament by John Wilkes and others, as they would no longer be accessible to the public (Hampton Court had long been open to visitors). They had been greatly studied by artists and cognoscenti alike whilst at Hampton Court, and played a crucial role in forming English expectations of a monumental style of painting; one of the great preoccupations of English art in the 18th century. These were often mentioned in the Discourses of Sir Joshua Reynolds, the dominant English critical work on art of the century. Having explained that "The principal works of modern art are in fresco" he specifically adds the cartoons "which, though not strictly to be called fresco, yet may be put under that denomination" before claiming that "Raffaelle ... stands in general foremost of the first painters..." (i.e. the best painters) and comparing Raphael's works in oil unfavourably to his frescoes.

In 1804 they were returned to Hampton Court, where in 1858 they were photographed for the first time by Charles Thompson Thurston, having been taken out into the courtyard and placed upside down on special scaffolding. In 1865 Queen Victoria decided that the cartoons should be exhibited on loan at the Victoria and Albert Museum in London, where they are still to be seen in a specially designed gallery. There are also copies at many locations, including Knole House and Hampton Court Palace, where the copies painted in the 1690s by an artist named Henry Cooke are displayed in the Cartoon Gallery. The Royal Collection also has a set of the tapestries. A set of copies painted by Sir James Thornhill have been owned by Columbia University since 1959, and another is in the Royal Academy.

Several other sets were made in Mortlake; Cleyn had made copies of the designs, and these were used. Charles I's set was bought by Cardinal Mazarin, and now belongs to the French government. Forde Abbey, Chatsworth House, the Duke of Buccleuch and others have sets. A set of six tapestries is now in the Gemäldegalerie Alte Meister in Dresden, and the Ducal Palace, Urbino displays a set.

== Prints after the designs ==
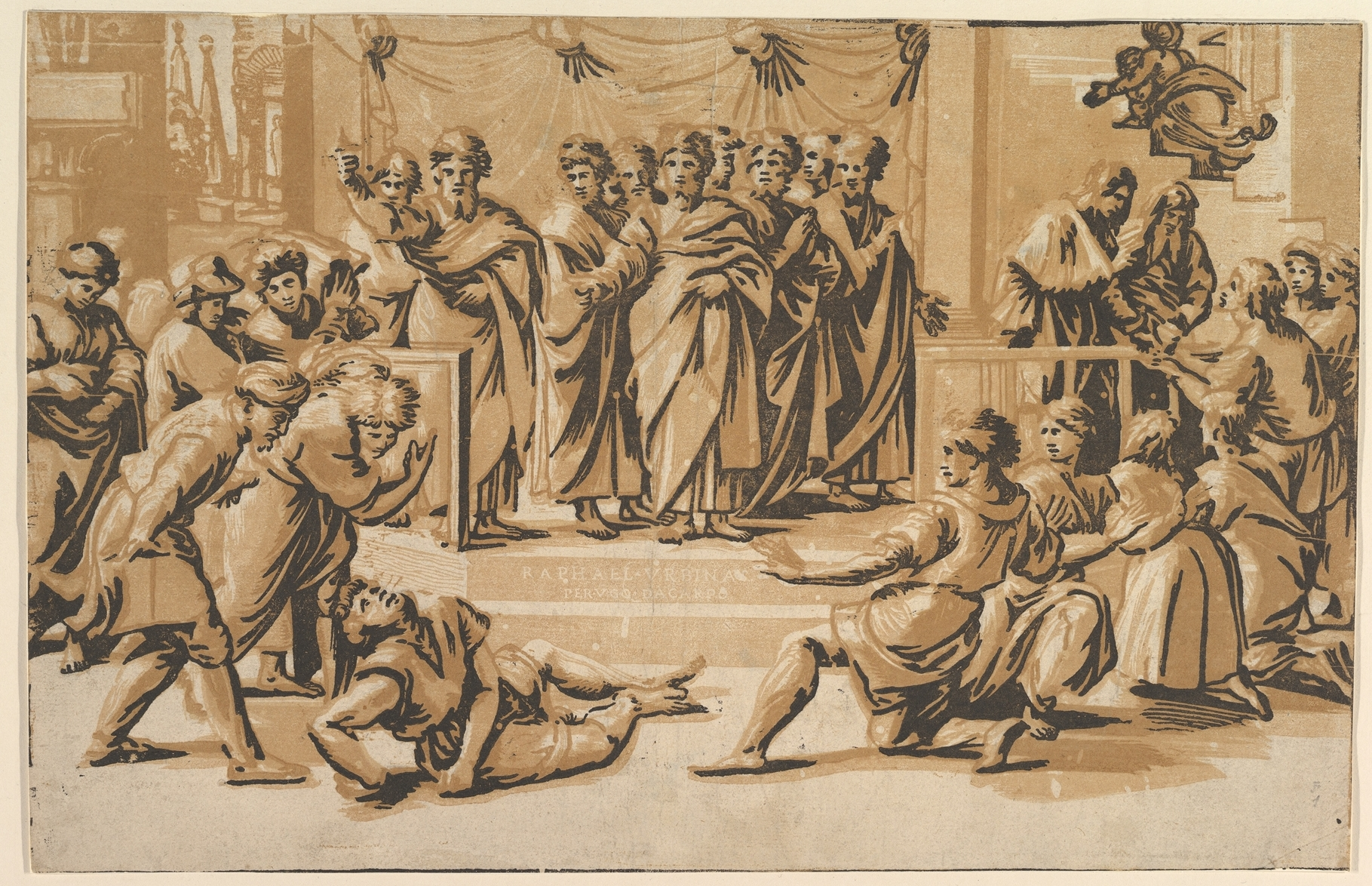
Death of Ananias, chiaroscuro woodcut in three blocks by Ugo da Carpi, 1518 (state without the copyright inscription).

In the early 16th century many Italian artists learnt the lesson of the huge, and very rapid, international prestige that Albrecht Dürer had gained through his prints, and set out to emulate him. Raphael had no knowledge of printmaking himself, and was probably too busy to want to learn the techniques, but he was the most successful of the Italians in spreading his fame through prints, through his much debated relationship with the engraver Marcantonio Raimondi and his workshop. Raphael made many drawings solely as designs for prints, and the workshop made a large number of prints, apparently working always from drawings rather than the finished work, of Raphael's paintings in the Vatican and elsewhere; the tapestry designs were no exception. These prints themselves were very widely copied by other printmakers, and spread rapidly through Europe.

The earliest datable print after one of the designs is an engraving of 1516 by Agostino Veneziano, then working in the workshop of Marcantonio Raimondi, of the Death of Ananias. This was probably made even before that tapestry was woven. The composition is in the same direction as the tapestry, but since the printmaking process would also reverse the direction of the composition, this almost certainly means it was deliberately reversed compared to the detailed preparatory drawing in the Royal Collection on which it was based (see above; the two agree in all details), probably by taking a counterprint from the chalk drawing. (Note: that is, rubbing a piece of paper against the print, so that a faint reversed image is transferred) All Raimondi and Veneziano's prints of Raphael's designs in Raphael's lifetime were based on drawings, according to both Landau and Pons. Raimondi himself engraved one of the set, which were presumably all produced around 1516, so that even many in the Roman art world may have seen prints of the designs before they saw the tapestries themselves.

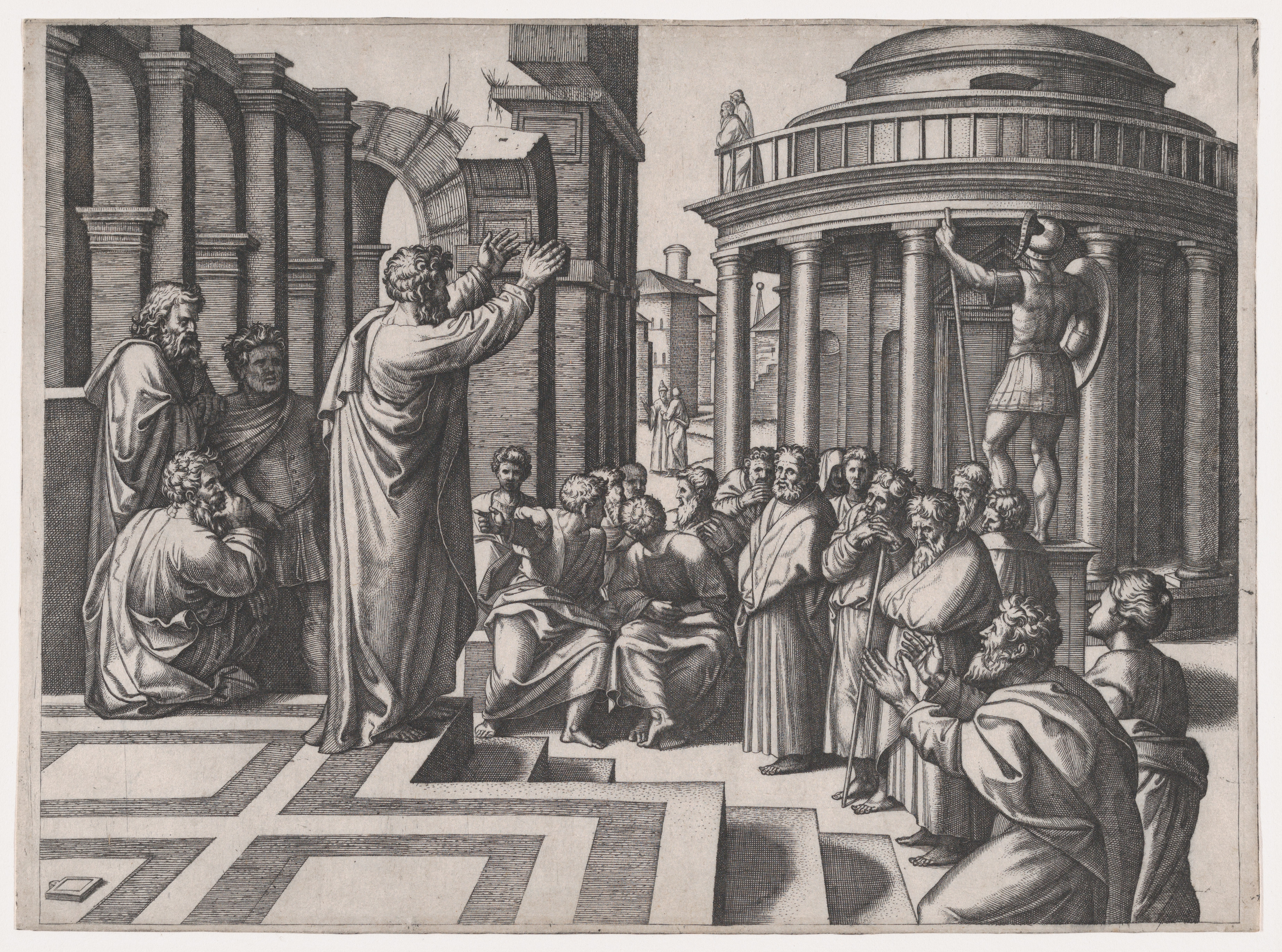
Marcantonio Raimondi, Saint Paul preaching in Athens, Italian engraving, before 1520. Copied from a preparatory drawing.

Agostino's engraving was rapidly copied in another well-known version, a four-colour chiaroscuro woodcut by Ugo da Carpi, dated 1518. The da Carpi woodcut is often cited in studies of the complex question of early image copyright, as it bears (in its first state) a Latin inscription beneath the image claiming "copyright"-style privileges from both the Venetian Republic and the Papacy (covering the Papal States) and threatening excommunication for anyone breaching the latter. Apart from other straightforward copies of the prints from the Raimondi set, Parmigianino did a typically individual print version of one design from the set in about 1530.

A later large set of engravings by Matthaeus Merian the Elder illustrating the Bible, from around the end of the century, used some of the compositions, slightly increasing the height, and elaborating them. These were much used and copied in popular books, further widening the knowledge of the designs to a much larger audience.

After the cartoons were reassembled at the end of the 17th century, by which time printmakers were well accustomed to copying direct from large paintings, they became the dominant source of new print copies. By the 18th century many different print versions were in circulation, of varying faithfulness and quality.

== See also ==
- List of paintings by Raphael
