= Diocese of Béziers =

Coordinates: 43.3416°N 3.2107°E

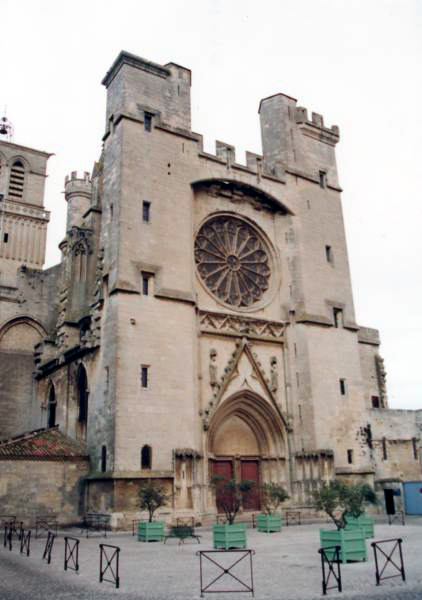
Béziers Cathedral

The Roman Catholic Diocese of Béziers (Lat.: Biterrensis)was situated in southern France, in Languedoc, west of the Rhone River. The diocese was in existence by the beginning of the 5th century. It was a suffragan (subordinate) of the archdiocese of Narbonne. In 1790, during the French Revolution, the Catholic diocese of Béziers and several others were suppressed by the Constituent Assembly, and their territory assigned to a new Constitutional Diocese of Hérault, whose schismatic bishop was seated at Béziers. The Catholic diocese of Béziers was abolished by Pope Pius VII in 1801, and never revived. It is no longer an independent diocese, and is part of the Diocese of Montpellier.

== History ==
In local tradition, the first Bishop of Béziers was considered to be the Egyptian saint, Aphrodisius, said to have sheltered the Holy Family at Hermopolis and to have become a disciple of Christ, also to have accompanied Sergius Paulus to Gaul when the latter went thither to found the Church of Narbonne. Local traditions made St. Aphrodisius arrive at Béziers mounted on a camel. and to have died a martyr at Béziers. Hence the custom of leading a camel in the procession at Béziers on the feast of the saint, which lasted until the French Revolution. It was revived in the late 20th century.

The first historically known bishop is Paulinus mentioned in 418. In 462, the Visigoths under King Euric occupied most of Languedoc. In the 6th 7th centuries, Béziers was repeatedly contested between the Visigoths and the Franks. The wars had a religious dimension, since the Visigoths were Arian Christians and the Franks were orthodox Catholics. Around 724, however, Béziers fell into the hands of the Muslims; they were opposed by Charles Martel (718–741) and driven out, destroying everything before relinquishing it. In 752, a Visigothic noble named Ansemund conquered Béziers, Agde, Maguelone and Nîmes, handing them over to Pepin the Short (751–768) in exchange for recognition as Count of Béziers, later reduced to Viscount.

In 1671, the cathedral Chapter of Saint-Nazaire in Béziers consisted of six dignities and twelve canons.

=== Murder in the cathedral ===
Raymond-Trencavel, one of the sons of Bernard-Aton, Viscount of Albi and Nîmes, became lord of Béziers in 1129. He followed King Louis VII of France on the Second Crusade in 1148. On his return, he claimed the countship of Carcassonne, in succession to his deceased elder brother. Though the succession was agreed upon by various lords and bishops, it was disputed in 1153 by Count Raymond V of Toulouse, who claimed suzereinity. He captured Raymond-Trencavel in battle, and imprisoned him, holding him for an immense ransom. The ransom for Tarymond-Trencavel was extracted from his unwilling subjects, who were moved to revolt by the harshness of the methods. On 1 October 1167, the bourgeois caught up with Viscount Raymond-Trencavel, and murdered him in the cathedral, at the foot of the high altar, in the presence of Bishop Bernard Gaucelin. In attempting to stop the deed, the bishop was wounded himself, suffering wounds about his head and losing several teeth. He was forced to take flight, and did not return until 1170. Pope Alexander III excommunicated the entire town.

=== Synods ===
A diocesan synod was an irregularly held, but important, meeting of the bishop of a diocese and his clergy. Its purpose was (1) to proclaim generally the various decrees already issued by the bishop; (2) to discuss and ratify measures on which the bishop chose to consult with his clergy; (3) to publish statutes and decrees of the diocesan synod, of the provincial synod, and of the Holy See.

Among the fifteen synods held at Béziers was that of 356 held by Saturninus of Arles, an Arian archbishop, which condemned Hilary of Poitiers. Later synods of 1233, 1243, 1246, and 1255 condemned the Cathars.

On 5 December 1248, at Valence, the papal legates Cardinal Pietro de Collemedio and Hugo de Santo Caro held a special council of four ecclesiastical provinces, Narbonne, Vienne, Arles and Aix, at the direction of Pope Innocent IV. The purpose was to excommunicate once again the Emperor Frederick II and his followers. The council also issued a set of 23 canons. Among those present was the Bishop of Béziers, Raymond de Vaihauquez.

A provincial council of the province of Narbonne was held in Béziers on 4 May 1279, under the presidency of Archbishop Pierre of Narbonne. A synod was held a Béziers in 1280, but nothing is known of the details. Another council of the province of Narbonne was held in Béziers in the Spring of 1296, to reply to the demands of King Philip IV of France for a subsidy of 10% of their incomes for a period of four years. Bishop Béringuer of Béziers was one of the representatives chosen to negotiate with the king. On 29–30 October 1299, Archbishop Gilles Aycelin of Narbonne held a provincial council in Béziers, to address the problem of Viscount Amaury of Narbonne, who, though a vassal of the archbishops of Narbonne, was claiming to be a direct vassal of the kings of France. On 7–9 November 1351, Archbishop Pierre of Narbonne held a provincial council in Béziers, the principal business of which was to determine the precedence among the suffragan bishops of the bishop of Maguelonne; the bishops temporized.

Bishop Hugues de la Jugie (1349–1371) held a diocesan synod on 31 July 1368, at which statutes were promulgated, containing 71 titles. He held another on the Feast of S. Luke, 17 October 1369. He held another on 17 April 1369, and again on the Feast of S. Luke, 17 October 1369. A synod also took place on 16 October 1370. Bishop Sicard d'Ambres de Lautrec (1371–1383) presided over a diocesan synod on 17 October 1375.

Bishop Barthelemy de Montcalve held a diocesan synod on 25 April 1409 (?). Bishop Guillaume de Montjoie (1424–1451) presided over a diocesan synod on 17 April 1426, and another on 17 October 1427. He attended the provincial council of Narbonne held in the episcopal palace in Narbonne on 29 May 1430.

On 21 March 1675, Bishop Armand Jean de Rotondy de Biscaras (1671–1702) held a diocesan synod and published its ordonances.

=== Other influences ===
It is said that in 1212, following the death of Bishop Pierre d' Aigrefeuille on 6 July 1212, St. Dominic refused the See of Béziers, to continue to devote himself to the crusade against the Albigenses. On 24 February 1248, the Dominican Order (Order of Preachers) founded a convent in Béziers on the site of the fortress which had been built by Simon de Montfort and destroyed by the people of Béziers.

On 8 May 1255, a general assembly of bishops and barons of Bas-Languedoc was held by King Louis IX of France in the episcopal palace of Béziers. Archbishop Guillaume of Narbonne presided. A set of thirty-two royal statutes were issued, regulating the conduct of royal officials, as well as the general conduct of the inhabitants. Frequenting inns, for example, was forbidden to anyone who was not a traveller.

Jews formed a substantial minority in the population of Languedoc, where they engaged in the usual permitted occupations like moneylending, medicine, and tax colleccting. They were generally protected by the nobility, whose finances they helped to manage and whose estates they supervised. In Béziers, one quarter of the town was populated by the Jews, who lived behind a strong wall, like a ghetto. It was necessary. For a two-week period, from the Saturday before Palm Sunday to the Saturday after Easter, Jews were hunted. On Palm Sunday morning the bishop would preach from the cathedral pulpit a sermon calling for vengeance on the Jews, who had crucified Christ; he then blessed the congregation, and authorized them to attack the houses and persons of the Jews. Only stones, however, could be used; but there was always bloodshed.

Canon Gilles Oger of Saint-Aphrodise, on 26 December 1438, presented a letter and a decree from the Council of Basel to Bishop Guilhaume de Montjoie (1424–1451), enjoining the churches of France, especially the cathedrals, to institute a reform of the divine office. On 3 January 1439, the bishop issued two ordonances implementing the decree of the council.

After discussions with officers of the municipality, of the local royal government, and Bishop Jean de Bonsi and others, it was agreed on 7 April 1599, that the Jesuits would staff the collège in Béziers which was under construction. There were to be seven classes in humanities, grammar, and philosophy, and eight teachers, brought from the Jesuit house in Toulouse.

==== Huguenots of Béziers ====
In August 1561, the bishop of Béziers and Administrator of Albi, Cardinal Lorenzo Strozzi, a cousin of the Queen-mother, Catherine de Medicis, was driving in his carriage through an area where the Huguenots were holding their services. He ordered them to cease. The Huguenots in response attacked the cardinal's messengers and wounded several of them, causing the cardinal to demand troops. He claimed to be unsafe in a city where half the population were heretics. When the Vicomte de Joyeuse arrived at Narbonne on 9 October 1561, he immediately had the Protestant pastor of Béziers, Antoine Vives, arrested, which provoked popular disorders. On being released from custody, Vives was struck by a musket, from which he died instantly.

When the Estates of Languedoc met at Béziers on 20 November 1561, the Huguenot Consistory presented a formal demand for churches for their own religion. The Estates reported to the king that they had not made any such grant, that it was an urgent matter to remedy the troubles caused by the Huguenots; they urged the syndic of the province to report the distress caused by the seizure of the Franciscan church in Nîmes by the Huguenots. At that time, Bishop Strozzi had already been assigned to Albi, and the new bishop of Bézieers, Giuliano de' Medici, had only just taken possession of the diocese that October. He had been appointed by queen Catherine to bring some firm control over the sectarians.

When the First French War of Religion (1562–1563) broke out, the Huguenots of Béziers rose in revolt. On 6 May 1562, they seized the city and laid waste to thirteen or fourteen churches, scattering the remains of saints, particularly Saint-Aphrodise. Under the leadership of Jacques de Crussol de Beaudiné, they seized, pillaged and desecrated the cathedral, turning the altars into stables for horses. Clergy were either murdered or thrown into prison. Beaudiné approriated for himself the revenues of the diocese.

=== French Revolution ===
The National Constituent Assembly ordered the replacement of political subdivisions of the ancien régime with subdivisions called "departments", to be characterized by a single administrative city in the center of a compact area. The decree was passed on 22 December 1789, and the boundaries fixed on 26 February 1790, with the effective date of 4 March 1790. A new department was created, called "Hérault", and its meeting center rotated among Montpellier, Béziers, Lodève, and Saint-Pons.

The National Constituent Assembly then, on 6 February 1790, instructed its ecclesiastical committee to prepare a plan for the reorganization of the clergy. At the end of May, its work was presented as a draft Civil Constitution of the Clergy, which, after vigorous debate, was approved on 12 July 1790. There was to be one diocese in each department, a policy later adhered to by Napoleon. Under the Civil Constitution of the Clergy, the seat of the Constitutional diocese of Hérault was fixed at Béziers, and Catholic diocese of Béziers and the other dioceses in Hérault were consequently suppressed, their territories becoming part of the new diocese of Hérault.

The French Directory fell in the coup engineered by Talleyrand and Napoleon on 10 November 1799. The coup resulted in the establishment of the French Consulate, with Napoleon as the First Consul. To advance his aggressive military foreign policy, he decided to make peace with the Catholic Church in France and with the Papacy. In the concordat of 1801 with Pope Pius VII, and in the enabling papal bull, "Qui Christi Domini", the constitutional diocese of Hérault and all the other dioceses in France, including the diocese of Béziers were suppressed. This removed all the institutional contaminations and novelties introduced by the Constitutional Church, and voided all of the episcopal appointments of both authentic and constitutional bishops. In the new ecclesiastical structure authorized by Pius VII, the departments of Hérault and Tarn were assigned to the restored diocese of Montpellier, and Montpellier was made a suffragan of the metropolitan archbishop of Toulouse. Despite the intention of Louis XVIII and Pius VII in 1817 to restore all the dioceses in the old archdiocese of Narbonne, the Concordat of 1817 was not approved thanks to the opposition of the liberal French parliament. Appointments to restored dioceses did not take place until 1822, and, though a bishop had been appointed in 1817, Jean-Paul-Gaston de Pins. The diocese of Béziers was not recreated, and the appointment lapsed.

A Papal Brief of 16 June 1877, authorized the bishops of Montpellier to call themselves bishops of Montpellier, Béziers, Agde, Lodève and Saint-Pons, in memory of the different dioceses united in the present Diocese of Montpellier. The diocese does not in fact use the titles.

== Bishops ==
=== To 1000 ===
- [ 250? : Saint Aphrodisius ]
- 418 Paulinus of Béziers

[ 415 : Dynamus ]

- c. 461 : Hermes of Béziers
- 589 : Sedatius of Béziers
- 633 : Petrus
- 683 : Cresciturus
- 688 : Pacotasis of Béziers
- 693 : Ervigius of Béziers
- 791 : Wulfegarius of Béziers

[ 833 : Stephanus ]

- 875–878 : Alaric
- 886–897 : Agilbert
- 897–898 : Fructuarius
- 898 : Matfred
- 906–933 : Reinard
- c. 936–954 : Rodoaldus (Raoul)
- c. 957–978, or later : Bernard (I) Géraud
- c. 987–1010 or 1011 : Matfred (II)

=== 1000 to 1300 ===
- 1016 : Urban
- 1017–1036 : Etienne (II)
- 1037–1046 : Bernard (II)
- 1050–1053 : Bèrenger (I)
- 1053–c. 1060 : Bernard (III) Arnaud
- 1061–c. 1066 : Bèrenger (II)
- 1077–1096 : Matfred III or c. 1070–c. 1093
- 1096–1121 : Arnaud de Lévézon
- Guiraud 1121–1123
- 1127 : Guillaume I de Serviez (Servian, Cerviez)
- 1128–1152 : Bermond de Lévezon
- 1152–1154 :Guillaume (II) or 1157
- 1159 : Raymond (I)
- 1159–1167 : Guillaume (III)
- 1167–1184 : Bernard (IV) de Gaucelin
- 1185–1199 : Geofroy (Gausfred) de Marseille
- 1199–1205 : Guillaume de Rocozels (Rocozels)
- 1205–1208 : Ermengaud
- 1208–1211 : Reginald (Renaud) de Montpeyroux
- 1211–1212 : Pierre d'Aigrefeuille
- 1212–1215 : Bertrand de Saint Gervais
- 1215 :Raymond (II) Lenoir
- 1215–1242 : Bernard V de Cuxac
- 1243 : R.
- [ 1244 : P. ]
- 1245–1247 : Raymond de Salles (Salle)
- 1247–1261 : Raymond de Vaihauquez (Valhauquès)
- 1261–1293 : Pons de Saint-Just
- 1293–1294 : Raymond (V) de Colombiers
- 1294–1305 : Berengar Fredol the Elder, cardinal

=== 1300 to 1500 ===
- 1305–1309 : Richard Neveu
- 1309–1312 : Berengar Fredol the Younger, cardinal
- 1313–1349 : Guilhaume V Frédol
- 1350 : Guilhaume de Landorre
- 1349–1371 : Hugues de la Jugie
- 1371–1383 : Sicard d'Ambres de Lautrec
- 1383 : Gui de Malsec Avignon Obedience
- 1383–1385 : Simon de Cramaud Avignon Obedience
- 1384–1402 : Barthelemy de Montcalve Avignon Obedience
- 1408–1422 : Bertrand II de Maumont Avignon Obedience
- 1422–1424 : Hugues II de Combarel
- 1424–1451 : Guillaume de Montjoie
- (1451) : Louis de Harcourt
- 1451–1456 : Pierre Bureau
- 1457–1490 Jean Bureau
- 1490–1503 ; Pierre Javailhac

=== From 1500 ===
- 1504–1537 : Antoine Dubois
- 1537–1543 : Jean de Lettes
- 1543–1545 : Jean de Narbonne
- 1546–1547 : François Gouffier
- 1547–1561 : Lorenzo Strozzi
- 1561–1571 : Giuliano di Pierfrancesco de' Medici
- [ 1572 : André Etienne ]

Sede vacante (1574–1576)

- 1576–1596 : Thomas (I) de Bonsi
- 1596–1621 : Jean de Bonsi
- [ 1615–1621 : Dominique de Bonzi (Bonsi) ]
- 1622–1628 : Thomas de Bonsi
- 1629–1659 : Clément de Bonsi
- 1660–1669 : Pierre de Bonzi
- 1671–1702 : Armand Jean de Rotondy de Biscaras
- 1702–1744 : Louis-Charles des Alris de Rousset
- 1744–1745 : Léon-Louis-Ange de Ghistelle de Saint-Floris
- 1745–1771 : Joseph-Bruno de Bausset de Roquefort
- 1771–1790 : Aymar Claude de Nicolaï

Constitutional church (schismatic)

- 1791–1799 : Dominique Pouderous
- 1799–1801 : Alexandre Victor Rouanet

== See also ==
- Catholic Church in France
- List of Catholic dioceses in France

== Bibliography ==
=== Reference works ===
- Gams, Pius Bonifatius (1873). Series episcoporum Ecclesiae catholicae: quotquot innotuerunt a beato Petro apostolo. Ratisbon: Typis et Sumptibus Georgii Josephi Manz. (Use with caution; obsolete)
- Eubel, Conradus, ed. (1913). Hierarchia catholica, Tomus 1 (second ed.). Münster: Libreria Regensbergiana. (in Latin)
- Eubel, Conradus, ed. (1914). Hierarchia catholica, Tomus 2 (second ed.). Münster: Libreria Regensbergiana. (in Latin)
- Gulik, Guilelmus (1923). Eubel, Conradus (ed.). Hierarchia catholica, Tomus 3 (second ed.). Münster: Libreria Regensbergiana.
- Gauchat, Patritius (Patrice) (1935). Hierarchia catholica IV (1592-1667). Münster: Libraria Regensbergiana.
- Ritzler, Remigius; Sefrin, Pirminus (1952). Hierarchia catholica medii et recentis aevi V (1667-1730). Patavii: Messagero di S. Antonio.
- Ritzler, Remigius; Sefrin, Pirminus (1958). Hierarchia catholica medii et recentis aevi VI (1730-1799). Patavii: Messagero di S. Antonio.

=== Studies ===
- Bellaud Dessalles, Mathilde (1901), Les évèques italiens de l'ancien diocèse de Béziers, 1547-1669. Paris: A. Picard.
- Bergin, Joseph (1996). The Making of the French Episcopate 1589-1661. New Haven CT USA: Yale University Press 1996.
- Douais, Célestin (1875). L'église des Gaules et le conciliabule de Béziers: tenu en l'année 356, sous la présidence de Saturnin d'Arles. (in French and Latin). Paris: H. Oudin, 1875.
- Douais, Célestin (1901). Documents sur l'ancienne province de Languedoc Beziers religieux (xiie-xviiie siècles). (in French and Latin). Paris: A. Picard, 1901.
- Duchesne, Louis (1907). Fastes épiscopaux de l'ancienne Gaule: I. Provinces du Sud-Est (in French) (2nd ed.). Paris: Fontemoing. pp. 309–310.. Archived.
- Du Tems, Hugues (1774). Le clergé de France, ou tableau historique et chronologique des archevêques, évêques, abbés, abbesses et chefs des chapitres principaux du royaume, depuis la fondation des églises jusqu'à nos jours (in French). Vol. Tome premier. Paris: Delalain.
- Fabregat, Auguste (1879). Vie des hommes illustres de Béziers: Mgr de Nicolay, dernière évêque de Béziers, 1738-1815. (in French). Béziers: Imprimerie générale, Granié et Malinas, 1879.
- Fisquet, Honoré (1864). La France pontificale (Gallia Christiana): Beziers, Lodève, Saint-Pons de Thomières (in French). Paris: Etienne Repos. pp. 1–284.
- Jean, Armand (1891). Les évêques et les archevêques de France depuis 1682 jusqu'à 1801 (in French). Paris: A. Picard. pp. 259–261.. Archived
- Pisani, Paul (1907). Répertoire biographique de l'épiscopat constitutionnel (1791-1802) (in French). Paris: A. Picard et fils.
- Sainte-Marthe, Denis de; Hauréau, Barthélemy (1739). Gallia Christiana: In Provincias Ecclesiasticas Distributa, De provincia Narbonensi (in Latin). Vol. Tomus sextus (VI). Paris: Typographia Regia. pp. 293–425, Instrumenta, 127–166.
- Sabatier, Ernest; Sabatier, Étienne (1854). Histoire de la ville et des évêques de Beziers. (in French). Béziers: Carrière, 1854.
- Tableau des évêques constitutionnels de France, de 1791 a 1801 (in French). Paris: chez Méquignon-Havard. 1827.
