= Berengar Fredol the Elder =

French canon lawyer and Cardinal-Bishop

- Cardinal-Bishop of Frascati
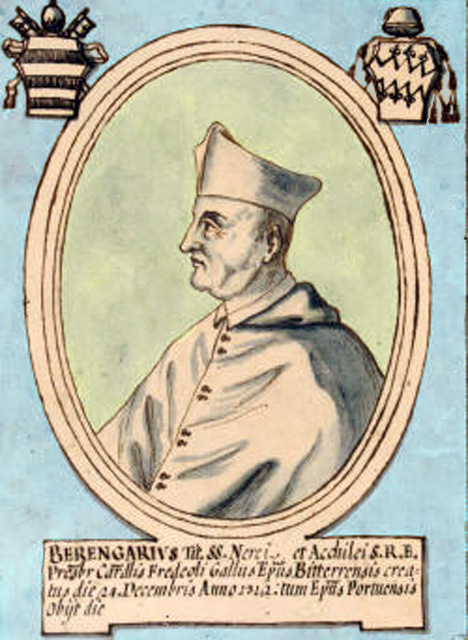
- Native name: Bérenger Frédol
- Church: Catholic Church
- Diocese: Suburbicarian Diocese of Frascati
- In office: December 1309 – 11 June 1323
- Predecessor: Giovanni Boccamazza
- Successor: Bertrand de La Tour
- Previous posts: Cardinal-Priest of Santi Nereo e Achilleo (1305-1309); Bishop of Béziers (1294-1305)

Orders
- Consecration: 24 August 1294 by Pope Celestine V
- Created cardinal: 15 December 1305 by Pope Clement V

Personal details
- Born: 1250 Lavérune, Languedoc, Kingdom of France
- Died: 11 June 1323 (aged 72–73) Avignon, Comtat Venaissin, Papal States

Berengar Fredol or Bérenger Frédol (1250 – 11 June 1323) was a French canon lawyer and Cardinal-Bishop of Frascati.

== Career ==
=== Celestine V ===
He was canon and precentor of Béziers, secular Abbot of Saint-Aphrodise in the same city, canon and archdeacon of Corbières, and canon of Aix. He later held the chair of canon law at the University of Bologna, and was appointed chaplain to Pope Celestine V, who in 1294 consecrated him Bishop of Béziers.

=== Boniface VIII ===
Fredol was one of those entrusted by Pope Boniface VIII with the compilation of the text of the Decretals, known as the Liber Sextus. He played a prominent role in the negotiations between the pope and Philip the Fair, and attended the council held in Rome in 1302.

=== Clement V ===
In 1305 Pope Clement V made him a cardinal, with the title of Sts. Nereus and Achilleus. The pope appointed him Major Penitentiary in (1306), and in 1309 raised him to the Cardinal-Bishopric of Frascati. The same pontiff employed him in investigating the charges made against the Knights Templars, and also in the enquiry into the peculiar tenets entertained at that time by a section of the Franciscan Order.

=== John XXII ===
On the death of Clement V, Fredol was proposed by the French cardinals for the vacant papal chair, but without success. He continued in favour with the new pope, Pope John XXII, by whose order he deposed the Abbot of Gerald and Hugo, Bishop of Cahors, for conspiring against the pope's life.

He became Dean of the Sacred College of Cardinals in April 1321.

== His works ==
The works of Fredol are chiefly concerned with canon law, and include "Oculus", a commentary on the "Summa" of Henry of Segusio (Basle, 1573), "Inventarium juris canonici", and "Inventarium speculi judicialis", abridged from a work of Durand, Bishop of Mende.

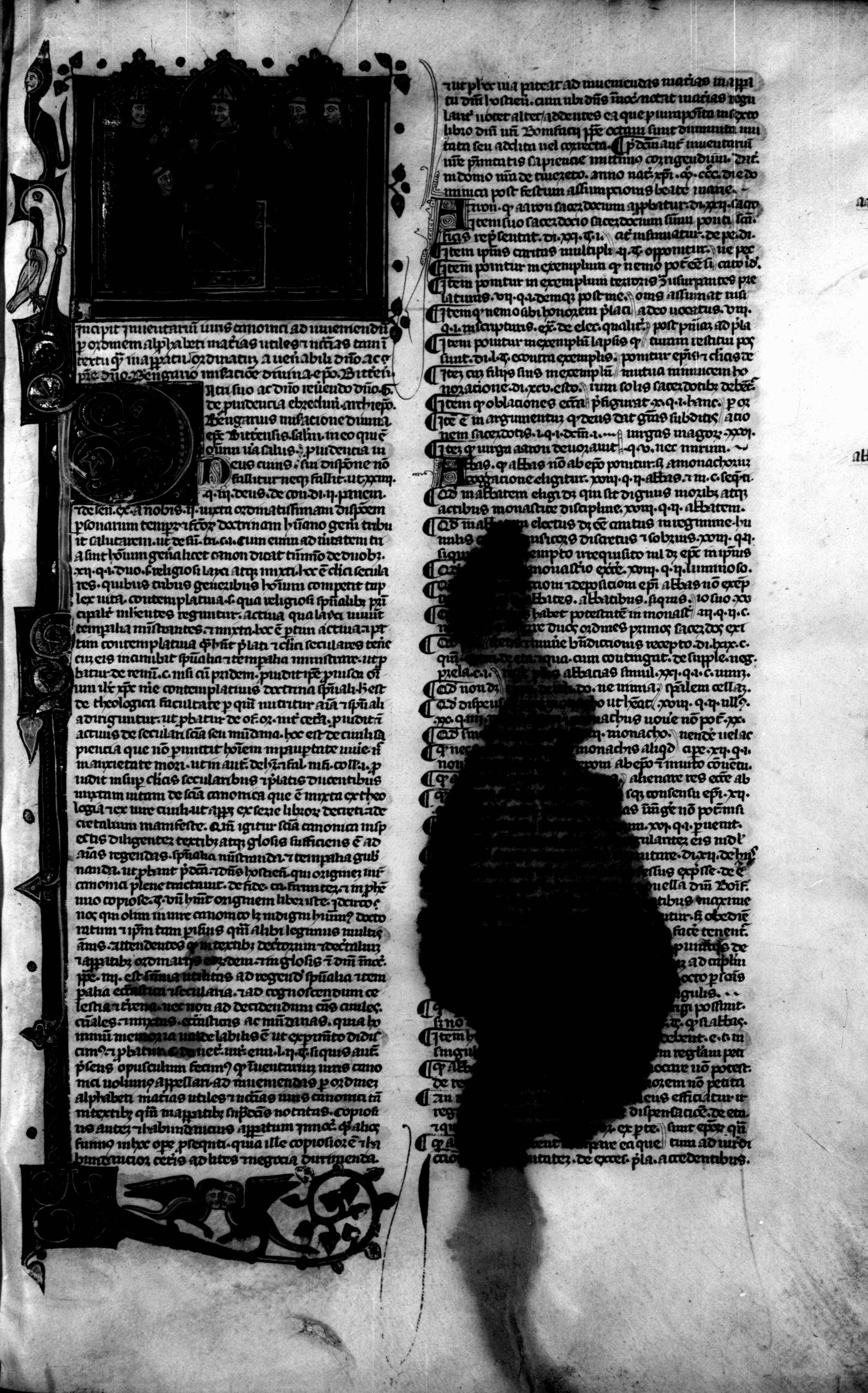
Tractatus de absolutionis cautela et de excommunicatione, manuscrit, 14e siécle
