= Sergius Paulus =

1st century AD Roman politician and proconsul of Cyprus

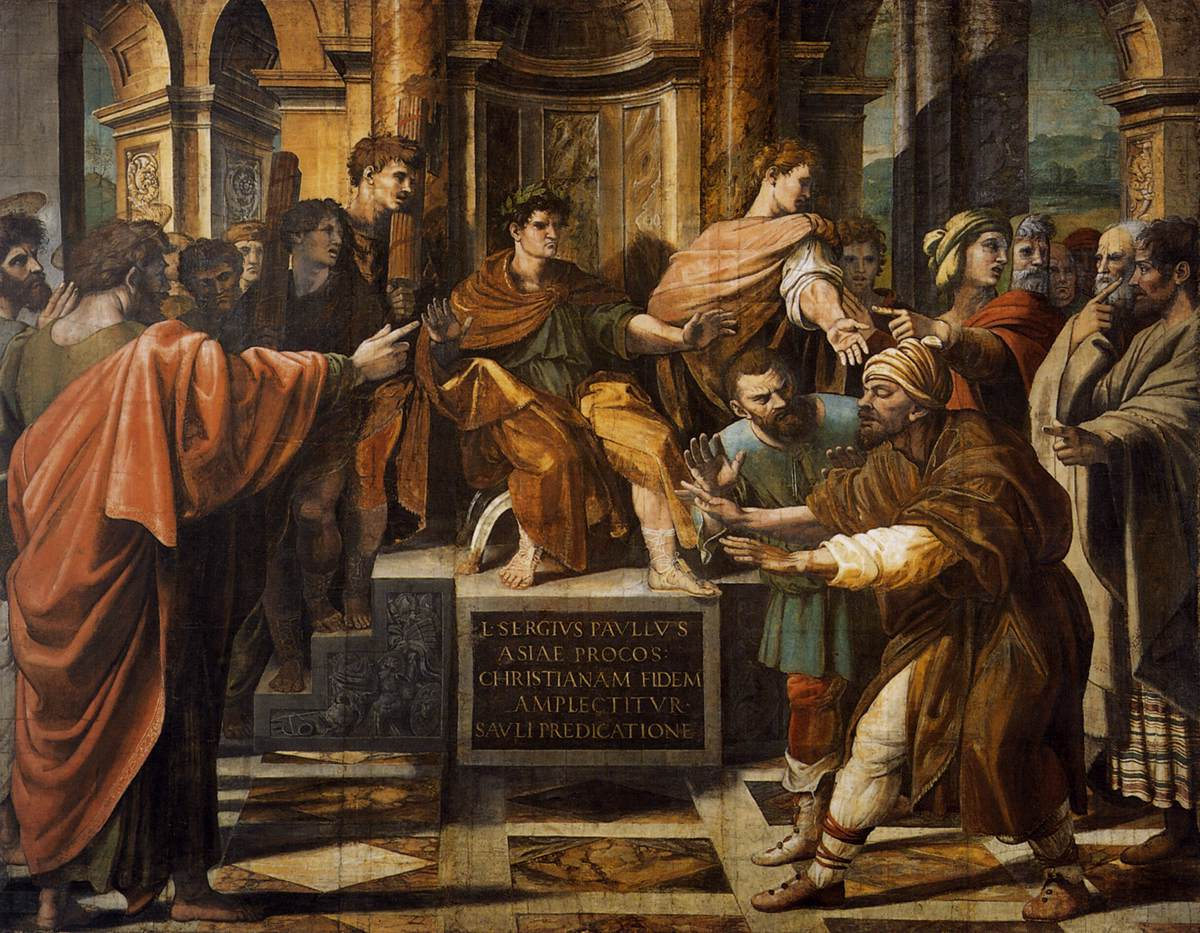
Elymas the sorcerer is struck blind before Sergius Paulus during Paul's visit. Painting by Raphael from the Raphael Cartoons.

Lucius Sergius Paulus or Paullus was a Proconsul of Cyprus under Claudius (r. 41-54 AD).

He appears in Acts 13:6-12, where in Paphos, Paul, accompanied by Barnabas and John Mark, overcame the attempts of Elymas "to turn the proconsul away from the faith" and converted Sergius to Christianity.

== Archaeology ==
A boundary stone of Claudius mentioning Sergius was discovered at Rome in 1887. It records the appointment (AD 47) of the Curators of the banks and the channel of the river Tiber, one of whom was Sergius. Since Paul's journey to Cyprus is usually dated to the first half of the 40s (and some scholars date his visit even earlier), it is thought Sergius may have first served three years as Proconsul at Cyprus, then returned to Rome, where he was appointed curator of the Tiber. Another inscription was discovered in 1887 at Soli, Cyprus, by Luigi Palma di Cesnola which mentions a proconsul Paulus. This inscription was dated to the middle of the 1st century by D. G. Hogarth. Terence Mitford noted that based on epigraphic grounds the inscription cannot be dated earlier than this and is probably considerably later. As he is not greeted in Paul's Epistle to the Romans, it is possible he died before it was written.

== Context ==
Writing in the 4th century, Jerome speculated that Saul of Tarsus had been renamed Paul (Paulus) because he had converted Sergius Paulus to Christianity:

"For as Scipio assumed the name of Africanus for himself when Africa was subjugated...so also Saulus, who was sent to preach to the nations, brought back from the initial spoils of the church, the proconsul Sergius Paulus, the trophy of his victory, and he raised a standard so that he was called Paulus."

Some medieval legends misidentified Sergius Paullus as Paul of Narbonne.

Sergius Paulus may have been the first of several successive senators named Lucius Sergius Paullus, of Antioch, Pisidia, including one who was consul suffectus c. 70, and another who was twice consul, Lucius Sergius Paullus, the father of Sergia Paulla, who married Quintus Anicius Faustus, Legate of Numidia in 198, and had Quintus Anicius Faustus Paulinus, governor of Moesia Inferior between 229 and 232.
