= Siege of Lavaur =

Siege of the Albigensian Crusade

Siege of Lavaur (1211)
- Part of the Albigensian Crusade
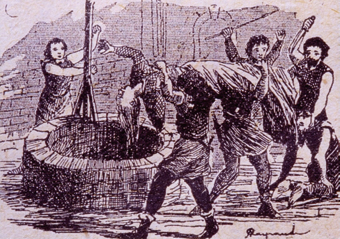
- Giralda of Laurac is thrown into the well of Lavaur
| Date | March/April – 3 May 1211 |
| Location | Lavaur, Occitania |
| Result | Crusader victory |

Belligerents
| Crusaders | Lordship of Lavaur |

Commanders and leaders
| Simon de Montfort; Peter II of Courtenay; Bishop Fulk of Toulouse | Aimeric of Montreal (executed); Giralda of Laurac (executed); Raymond-Roger, Count of Foix; Raymond VI, Count of Toulouse (covert military and political support) |

Casualties and losses
| Lavaur: Minimal; Montgey: ~1500 killed | 80 knights executed ~400 cathars executed |

The Siege of Lavaur was a military engagement which took place from late March/early April to 3 May 1211 during the Albigensian Crusade. It took place in the Languedoc region of southern France against the town of Lavaur. The Siege was led by Simon de Montfort as part of the Crusader effort to eliminate Catharism, a Christian sect regarded as heretical, from Southern France. After about a month of fighting, the garrison surrendered. 80 knights and around 400 cathars were executed.

== Background ==
In 1209, Pope Innocent III began the Albigensian Crusade in order to eliminate Catharism. The Cathars were a heretical Christian sect which had taken root in Southern France and threatened the influence and power of the Catholic Church in the region. Following the Siege of Carcassonne, Simon de Montfort took command of the crusade and took control of the lands formerly controlled by the Viscount of Carcassonne, Raymond Roger Trencavel.

Montfort campaigned against Cathar holdouts throughout 1210, besieging and taking Minerve and Termes. The fall of these well fortified strongholds demoralized opponents of the Crusade, leading to a string of easy victories. Coustaussa, Castres, and Lombers were taken without a fight and Puivert surrendered after a 3-day siege. In 1211, Pierre Roger de Cabaret surrendered the Castle of Cabaret which had previously resisted a siege in 1209.

After the fall of Cabaret, Lavaur was the final stronghold in the former Trencavel territory that still resisted. Lavaur was a fortified town on relatively flat, open terrain along the Agout River. Like Minerve, Lavaur was also a haven for Cathars and was sheltering refugees from the crusade. Furthermore, a southern lord named Aimeric of Montreal, had broken his peace agreement with Montfort and fled to Lavaur to help command its garrison. For these reasons, the crusader army chose Lavaur as its next target.

== Opposing forces ==
The defenders were led by the lady of Lavaur, Giralda of Laurac, and her brother, Aimeric of Montreal. There were at least 80 knights that had been gathered to defend the town, alongside the existing garrison. Some knights had also been sent covertly by Raymond VI, Count of Toulouse. Count Raymond had been excommunicated in 1211, but had not yet opened hostilities with the crusaders.

The crusaders were led by Simon de Montfort. At the onset of the siege, the crusaders were small in number and suffering from a lack of supplies. This was partially due to Count Raymond forbidding the transport of siege equipment, weapons, or armor to the crusaders, despite ostensibly being their ally. Over the course of the siege, Montfort would receive reinforcements from new contingents of crusaders as well as a group of pro-crusader militia from Toulouse.

== Siege ==
=== Initial phase ===
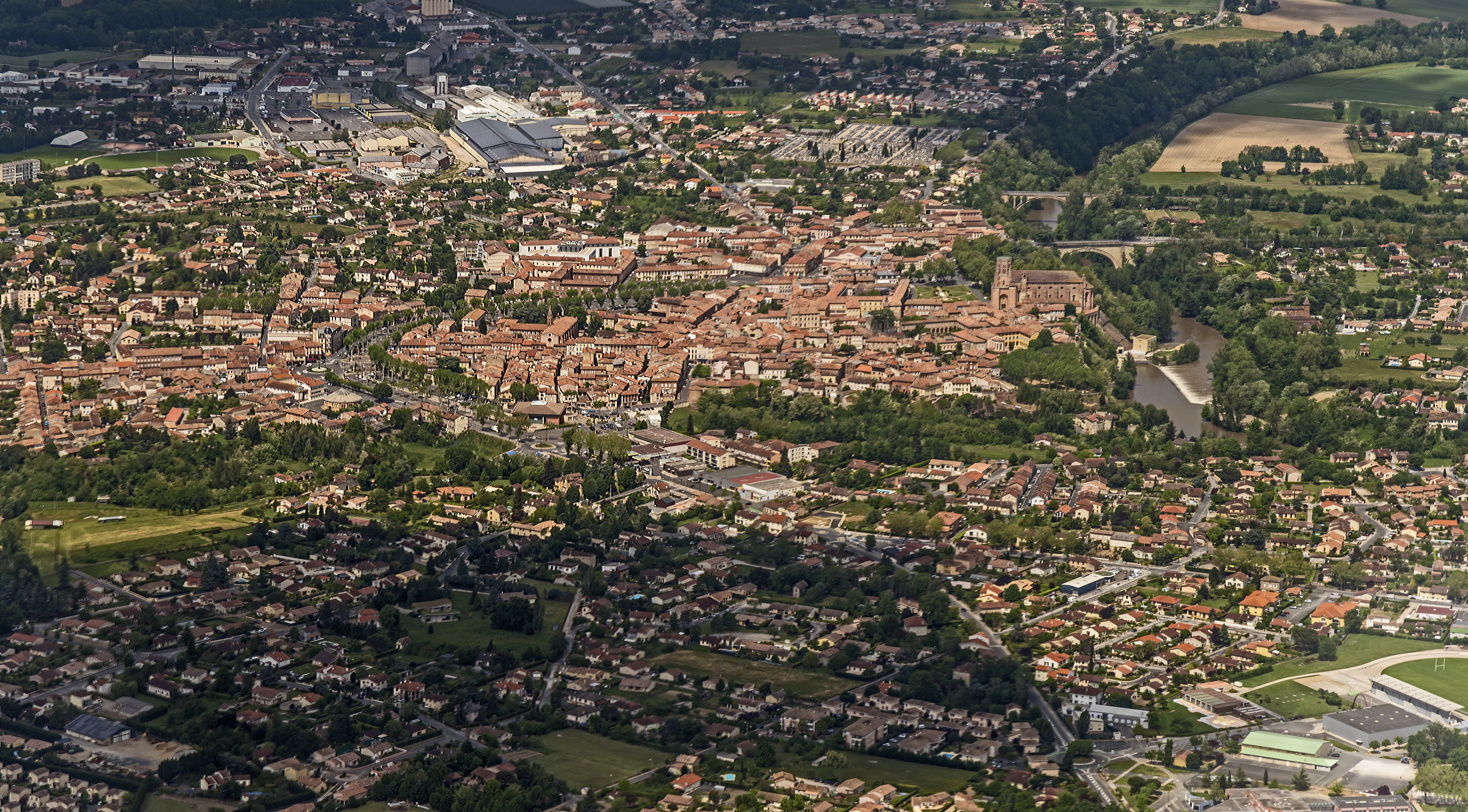
Aerial view of Lavaur

When the siege began, the crusaders only had enough men to blockade one side of the town. Though small in number and besieging only one side, the crusaders split their force into two camps to maximize their coverage. However, this left each camp isolated and unable to reinforce each other easily. On the first day of the siege, a sortie by the defenders succeeded in capturing a knight who was then killed.

Over the next several days, more contingents of crusaders led by the Count of Auxerre, the Bishop of Lisieux, and the Bishop of Bayeu arrived. With these reinforcements, the crusaders built a wooden bridge over the Agout river and were able to surround the entire town as well as build siege engines to bombard the walls. The crusaders received further reinforcements from the White Brotherhood, a pro-crusader militia from Toulouse.

Count Raymond tried to prevent the White Brotherhood from supporting the siege but was unsuccessful. According to contemporary chronicler William of Puylaurens, Raymond used "threats and prayers" to dissuade them but the militia responded that they felt greater loyalty to Bishop Fulk who had ordered them to assist the crusaders. When this failed, William writes that the Count:

threw his arms across the bars holding the gates shut, and prevented them from leaving by vowing that they would have to break his arms before they could pass through

With their path blocked, the militia marched out of a different section of Toulouse and successfully made it to Lavaur. When the defenders inside Lavaur saw a force from Toulouse approaching, they initially believed it was Count Raymond coming to save them. Once they saw the militia join the siege camp, they realized their mistake and suffered a serious blow to their morale.

=== Battle of Montgey ===
While the crusader army under Simon de Montfort was besieging Lavaur, a large force of reinforcements was making its way from Carcassonne. The army was composed of German and Frisian crusaders and estimated at around 1,500 men. Meanwhile, the Count of Foix, his son Roger-Bernard, and Giraud of Pepieux led a force of knights, mounted sergeants, and mercenaries to Montgey. Within this army were also men sent by Count Raymond who was not yet considered an enemy to the crusade.

Near Montgey, Foix and his army ambushed the crusaders and killed nearly all of them before quickly riding to Montgiscard. When Montfort learned about the ambush from a survivor, he led a mounted force in pursuit of Foix but was unable to catch him. Montfort was forced to return to Lavaur and continue the siege.

=== Fall of Lavaur ===
Despite the heavy losses at Montgey, the crusaders continued the siege. the crusaders built a cat (a mobile wooden shelter) which was dragged to the wall to provide cover as men began filling the ditch around the town. However, the defenders had a mine that connected with the ditch and every night the defenders would use it to clear out the wood and debris. At one point during the siege, the defenders used the mine to sally out and attempt to burn the cat. This plan failed when the defenders were spotted and the fire was put out.

To prevent the defenders from using the mine, the crusaders placed large quantities of flammable material at the entrance of the mine and set it on fire. Less flammable material was then placed on top which prevented the smoke from rising up and directed it towards the mine. The smoke made its way through the tunnel, making it inaccessible to the garrison. The crusaders were then able to fill enough of the ditch to bring the cat up to the wall. Protected by the cat, miners were able to begin mining the wall. The defenders were unable to destroy the cat and on the 3rd of May, the miners were able to breach the walls. As soon as the crusaders began an assault, the defenders surrendered.

== Aftermath ==
When the town surrendered, Montfort ordered Aimeric of Montreal and his 80 knights to be hanged. After Aimeric was executed, the gallows began to collapse and Montfort had the remaining prisoners put to the sword. Giralda of Laurac was thrown into a well and killed by stones dropped upon her. Then up to 400 cathars were burned to death. Unlike at Minerve, the cathars were not given the choice to convert to avoid execution.

There were several reasons for the executions of the garrison and cathars. Montfort considered Aimery, as well as many of his knights, to be traitors who had broken their oaths. Giralda was likely executed because of her active role in leading the defenders. The crusaders had also taken the town by storm rather than a negotiated surrender, leaving their fates entirely in Simon's hands. Furthermore, the crusaders were likely furious at the massacre of their allies at Montgey and wanted revenge for their deaths.

The knights that the Count of Toulouse had sent in secret were discovered. This finally led Simon to declare Raymond as an outright enemy of the crusade. After leaving Lavaur, the crusaders destroyed Montgey as revenge for the Count of Foix's ambush. Montfort then invaded the lands directly held by Count Raymond, eventually leading to the First Siege of Toulouse

== Bibliography ==
=== Secondary sources ===
- Marvin, Laurence W. (2008). The Occitan War: A Military and Political History of the Albigensian Crusade, 1209-1218. Cambridge, UK: Cambridge University Press. ISBN 978-0521123655.
- Marvin, Laurence W. (2001). "War in the South: A First Look at Siege Warfare in the Albigensian Crusade". War in History. 8 (4). London, UK: SAGE Publications: 373–95. ISSN 0968-3445. JSTOR 26013906.
- Evans, Austin P (1962). "VIII THE ALBIGENSIAN CRUSADE". In Wolff, Robert Lee; Hazard, Harry W. (eds.). A History of the Crusades, Volume 2: The Later Crusades. University of Pennsylvania Press. pp. 277–324. JSTOR j.ctv4s7mwv.17.
- Sumption, Jonathan (1999). The Albigensian Crusade. London, UK: Faber. ISBN 978-0571200023.
- Strayer, Joseph R (1992). The Albigensian Crusades. Ann Arbor, MI: University of Michigan Press. ISBN 978-0472064762.

=== Primary sources ===
- Peter of les Vaux de Cernay (1998) [1212-1218]. The History of the Albigensian Crusade: Peter of les Vaux-de-Cernay's Historia Albigensis. Translated by Silby, W.A.; Silby, M.D. Suffolk, UK: Boydell & Brewer. ISBN 0-85115-807-2.
- William of Tudela; Anonymous (2000) [1213]. The Song of the Cathar Wars: A History of the Albigensian Crusade. Translated by Shirley, Janet. Burlington, VT: Ashgate Publishing Company. ISBN 9780754603887.
- William of Puylaurens (2003) [1200s]. The Chronicle of William of Puylaurens: The Albigensian Crusade and its Aftermath. Translated by Silby, W.A.; Silby, M.D. Suffolk, UK: Boydell & Brewer. ISBN 978-1-84615-043-2.
