= Siege of Termes =

Siege during the Albigensian Crusade

Coordinates: 43°00′08″N 2°33′24″E

Siege of Termes (1210)
- Part of the Albigensian Crusade
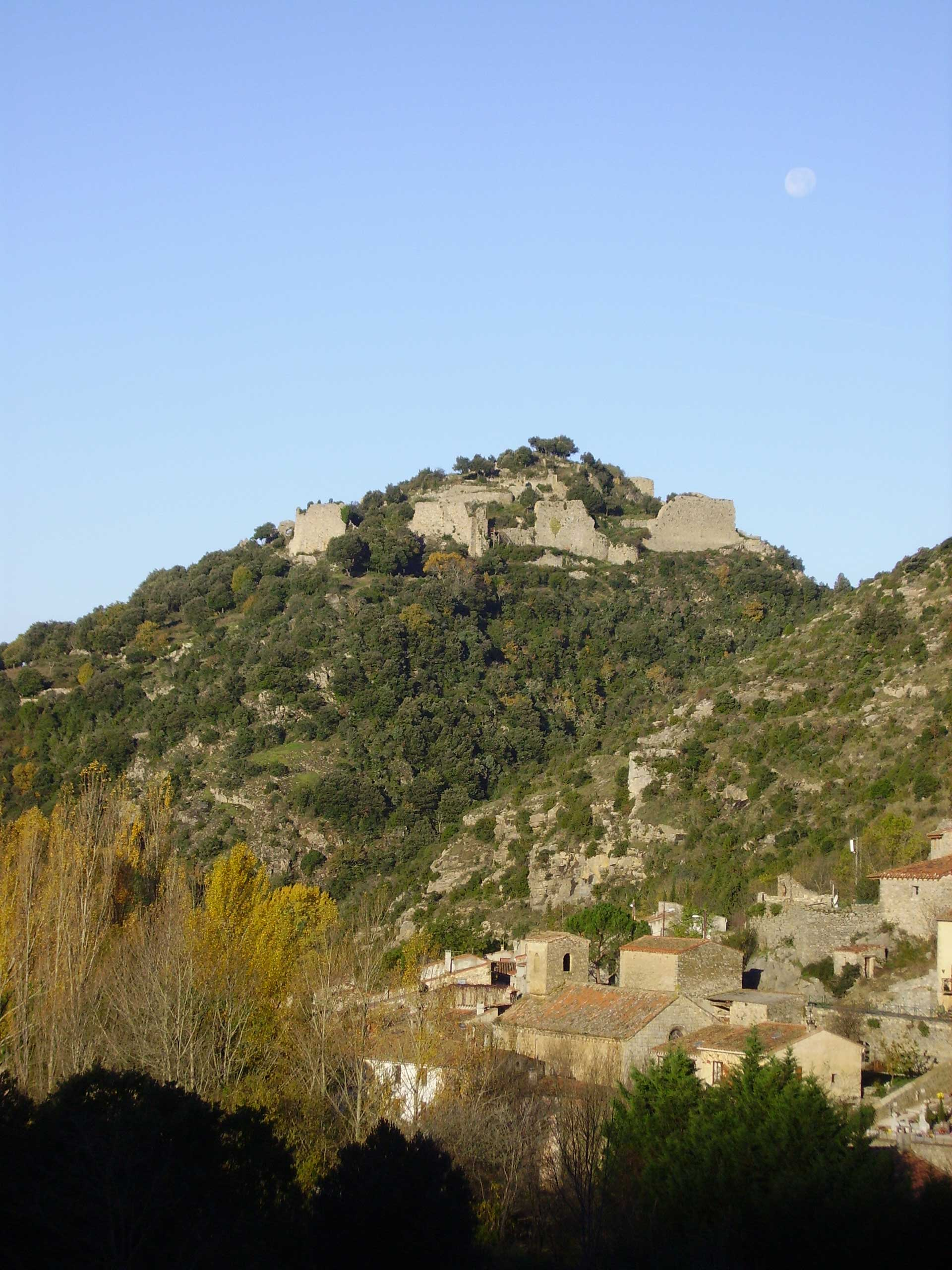
- The ruins of the castle of Termes, on a hilltop above the village
Date	Early August – 22 November 1210
Location	Castle of Termes, Occitania
Result	Crusader victory

Belligerents
Crusaders	Lordship of Termes; Lordship of Cabaret

Commanders and leaders
Simon de Montfort; Reginald of Bar; Philip of Dreux; Robert II, Count of Dreux; William IV, Count of Ponthieu	Raimon of Termes (POW); Pierre Roger de Cabaret

Casualties and losses
Minimal	Heavy

The Siege of Termes was a military engagement which took place from August to November 1210 during the Albigensian Crusade. It took place in the Languedoc region of southern France at the Castle of Termes. The Siege was led by Simon de Montfort as part of the Crusader effort to eliminate Catharism, a Christian sect regarded as heretical, from Southern France. After nearly four months of siege, the castle fell on the 22nd of November.

== Background ==
The Albigensian Crusade began in 1209 at the behest of Pope Innocent III in order to eliminate the heretical Christian sect known as Catharism, which had taken root in Southern France. The Crusade was initially led by the Abbot of Cîteaux, Arnaud Amaury, but command over the crusade was transferred to Simon de Montfort following the Siege of Carcassonne. After several smaller victories, Montfort besieged Cabaret but was repulsed.

With fresh reinforcements, Montfort continued his campaign in the Spring of 1210, beginning with a successful Siege of Bram in March. The next major engagement was the Siege of Minerve, which Montfort took on 22 July 1210. The next target for the crusader army was the castle of Termes.

Termes was a well fortified mountaintop castle surrounded by deep ravines on 3 sides and overlooking a large cliff. The castle had an outer and inner layer of walls, as well a fortified suburb on its south side. Furthermore, 200 meters northwest of the castle, was a separate fortified tower known as Termenet. According to contemporary chronicler Peter of Vaux-de-Cernay, the fortress was considered to be "unbelievably strong" and "quite impregnable". Due to the cliff and ravines, the castle could only be attacked from the south.

== Opposing Forces ==
At the onset of the siege, Montfort had a significantly reduced force compared to earlier campaigns. Many lords and the militia of Narbonne had departed after the Siege of Minerve, and it was not until a small contingent led by William of Cayeux arrived that Montfort felt confident in besieging Termes. Throughout the siege, Montfort's army would shrink and grow as crusaders performed their 40 days duty required for an indulgence.

The defenders were led by Raimon of Termes, lord of the castle and either a cathar himself or sympathetic to their cause. Raimon had long been aware that the crusaders would besiege his fortress, so he had bolstered the garrison with contingents of militia as well as Aragonese, Brabancon, Catalan, and Roussillon mercenaries. He had also stocked the castle with plenty of food, water, and supplies. Pierre Roger de Cabaret (who's castle Simon failed to take in 1209) raided and harassed the crusader forces throughout the duration of the siege.

== Skirmish at Carcassonne ==
Before moving on to besiege Termes, Montfort had chosen William of Contres to command the garrison of Carcassonne. One of his first actions was to oversee the delivery of a convoy of siege weapons to Termes. However, a spy within Carcassonne was able to inform Pierre-Roger of the lightly guarded wagon train sitting outside the walls of the town by the Aude River. The Lord of Cabaret lead a force of roughly 300 mounted knights and sergeants to attack the wagon train which was defended by around 100 men.

The nighttime assault initially succeeded in driving off the guards and the raiders began to smash and burn the siege engines. William of Contres led a counter-attack at the head of a group of knights and 80 sergeants, which succeeded in driving off the attackers. However, Pierre-Roger and his raiding party returned at dawn and again tried to destroy the siege engines. During the fighting, Pierre-Roger was surrounded and nearly captured, but was able to escape. The chronicler Peter of Vaux-de-Cernay wrote that:

fearing for his safety he joined our men in shouting 'Montfort! Montfort' as if he were on our side. So he escaped and fled into the hills..."

With the siege weapons successfully defended, the convoy left Carcassonne on July 31st. A large contingent of Breton crusaders had recently arrived at Carcassonne and was able to safely escort the siege train to Termes.

== Siege ==
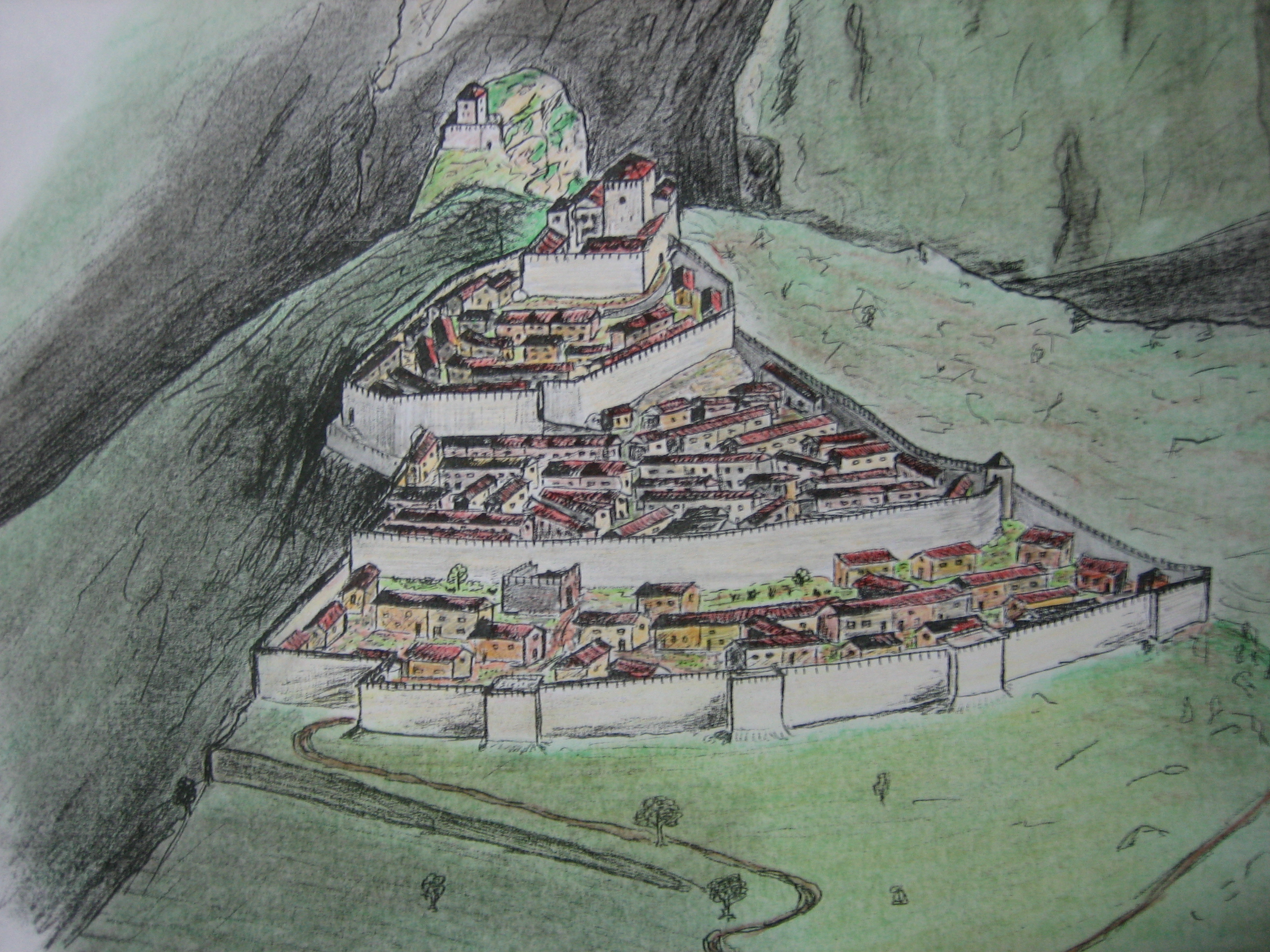
Illustration of what the Castle of Termes may have looked like in 1210

Montfort's initial army was not large enough to fully encircle Termes, allowing the defenders to continue bringing in water and other supplies. Even with the arrival of the siege train and Breton reinforcements, Montfort's force was small enough that, according to Peter of Vaux-de-Cernay, the defenders taunted the besiegers over the size of their army. Furthermore, Pierre-Roger and his men used Cabaret as a base from which to raid and ambush small contingents of crusaders.

Despite Montfort's initially weak position, reinforcements continued to arrive from France, Germany, and Italy. Siege engines were assembled in order to continuously bombard the walls of the fortress. After several days of bombardment, the walls of the outer suburb were weakened, and the crusaders prepared for an assault on the walls. Seeing the preparations for the assault, the defenders set fire to the outer suburb and retreated to the inner suburb. As the besiegers made their way into the unoccupied outer suburb, the defenders suddenly attacked and drove them back out. At this point, the crusaders decided to besiege Termenet, which was impeding their ability to besiege the castle.

Neutralizing Termenet was now the top priority for the crusader army. They began by surrounding the tower in order to cut it off from the main castle. Next, the crusaders set up a mangonel to bombard the tower. To counter this, the defenders also built a mangonel to try and destroy it, but were unsuccessful. With the crusaders able to bombard the tower unopposed and with no reinforcements or supplies able to reach the tower, the defenders of Termenet fled the tower during the night. Sergeants belonging to the Bishop of Chartres were then able to occupy the tower, raising his standard at its top.

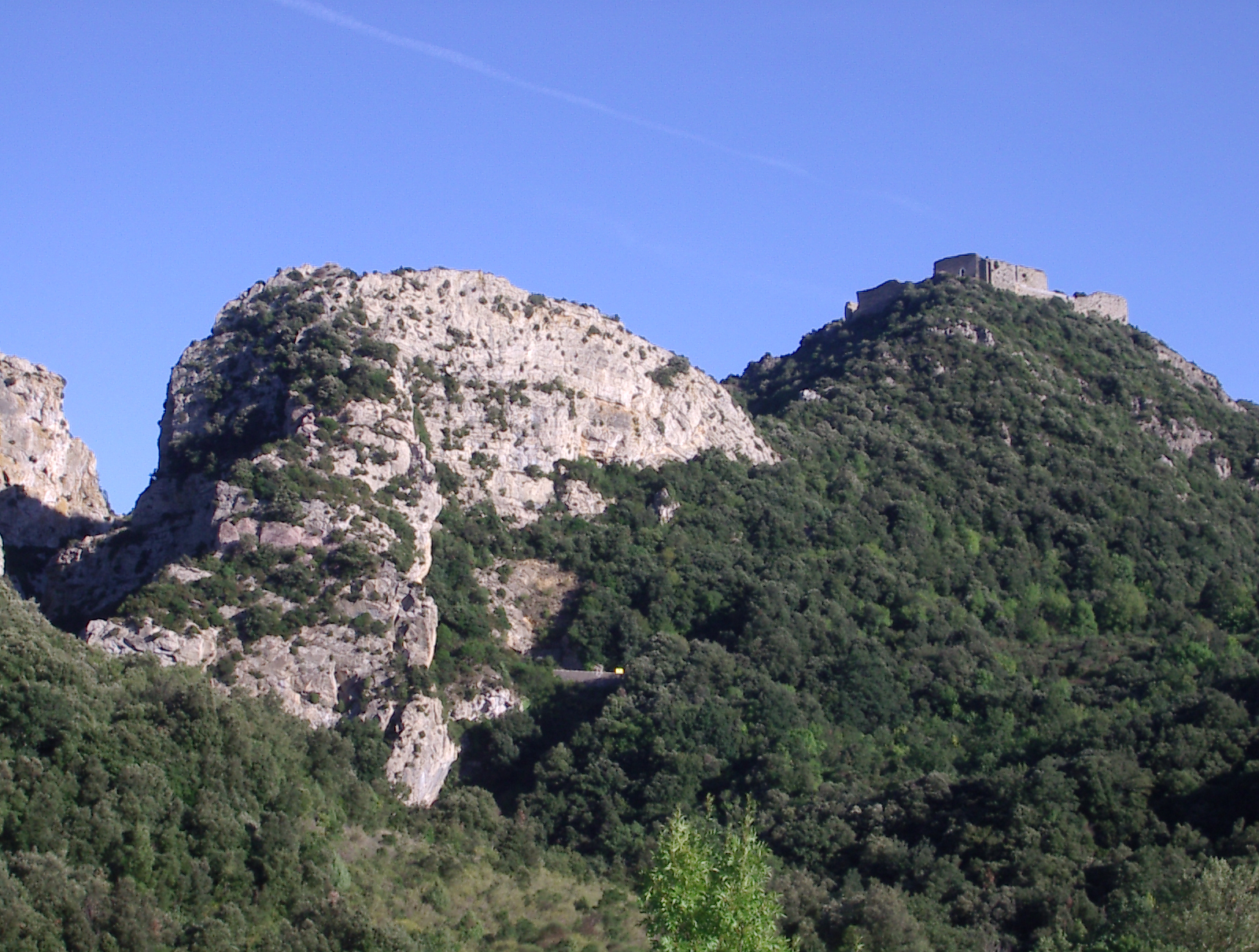
The Castle of Termes and the gorges around Termenet

With Termenet taken, The crusaders continued to bombard the walls of the castle. However, whenever the defenders saw that a part of the wall was weakening, they would build a makeshift wall of wood and stone behind it. When the crusaders stormed a breach in the walls, they were met with a new wall and forced to retreat. Meanwhile, the defenders also used siege engines to bombard the siege camp. These siege engines almost killed Simon de Montfort on two occasions, once when a boulder struck and killed a knight that Montfort was talking to and again when a ballista bolt killed a sergeant right behind him.

Sometime after the fall of Termenet, the besiegers installed a new mangonel in, as Peter writes, "an inaccessible place at the foot of a crag near the wall." Due to its isolated location, Montfort assigned five knights and 300 sergeants to guard the weapon. One night, the defenders came down from the walls with 80 men and attacked the position. According to Peter, all of the sergeants and all but one of the knights fled in fear. Only one knight, William of Ecureuil, stayed to defend the mangonel. Due to the difficulty in reaching the siege engine, William was able to hold off the raiders. Realizing they would not be able to reach him in time, the besiegers launched an attack on the castle walls to draw attention away from the mangonel. Seeing this, the raiders retreated back to the castle and both William and the mangonel were saved.

== Fall of Termes ==
The siege continued for months with the crusaders unable to make any great advances. The constant flow of crusaders leaving and arriving complicated operations, while food began to run low. Behind the walls, the situation was also dire. The crusader army had eventually been able to fully surround and cut off the defenders from reaching their water source. Sometime in late October, the garrison's water supply ran out and Raimon of Termes was forced to negotiate with Montfort. Raimon agreed to give up the castle under the condition that he could retain his other lands and that Termes would be given back to him by Easter of 1211. While these terms were not favorable to Montfort, he felt compelled to agree since a large contingent of his army was preparing to leave. Both Simon and his wife, Alice, pleaded with the lords to stay but only the Bishop of Chartres agree to remain longer. With the terms set, Raimon agreed to surrender the castle the next day.

That night, a heavy rain filled the cisterns and barrels of the garrison. In the morning, the Bishop of Beauvais, the Count of Dreux, and the Count of Ponthieu left the siege. With his water supplies replenished and seeing Montfort's army melt away, Raimon broke the agreed upon terms and refused to surrender the castle. When the Bishop of Chartres left the next day, the defenders sallied out to destroy the crusader siege engines, but Montfort and his remaining men were able to force the raiders to retreat.

In late October, a contingent of foot soldiers from Lorraine arrived, increasing the strength and morale of the besiegers. Meanwhile, the crusader siege engines continued to bombard the walls and keep of Termes. Eventually, on the 22nd of November, the crusaders had built a covered trench up to the castle walls and began to mine it. The two primary sources on the siege, William of Tudela and Peter of Vaux-de-Cernay, give different reasons for the following events. William writes that the defenders were suffering from dysentery caused by rainwater filling contaminated barrels. Peter writes that the sight of the sappers and fear of an imminent breach caused them to panic. Both Marvin and Sumption agree that both factors played a contributing role.

On the night of November 22nd, suffering from sickness and fearing a breach in their walls, the defenders decided to flee the castle in the night. The attempt was spotted and the alarm was raised, with many of the garrison being captured or killed. Raimon of Termes was captured and brought to Simon de Montfort, who had him imprisoned in Carcassonne where he died several years later.

== Aftermath ==
After the fall of Termes, Montfort continued to campaign for the rest of 1210. Coustaussa was abandoned after its inhabitants heard that Termes had been taken. The Castle of Puivert surrendered after a three day siege. Montfort then retook Castres and Lombers, two towns that had rebelled. Aware of Montfort's military reputation following the Siege of Minerve and Termes, both towns surrendered without a fight.

== Bibliography ==
=== Secondary Sources ===
- Marvin, Laurence W. (2008). The Occitan War: A Military and Political History of the Albigensian Crusade, 1209-1218. Cambridge, UK: Cambridge University Press. ISBN 978-0521123655.
- Marvin, Laurence W. (2002). "Thirty-Nine Days and a Wake-up: The Impact of the Indulgence and Forty Days Service on the Albigensian Crusade, 1209–1218". The Historian. 65 (1). Oxfordshire, UK: Taylor & Francis, Ltd.: 75–94. doi:10.1111/1540-6563.651017. ISSN 0018-2370. JSTOR 24450934.
- Williams, Gareth (2013). "The Crusader and the Cross: Simon de Montfort and the Siege of Termes". Medieval Warfare. 3 (4). Netherlands: Karwansaray BV: 15–19. ISSN 2211-5129. JSTOR 48578253.
- Sumption, Jonathan (1999). The Albigensian Crusade. London, UK: Faber. ISBN 9780571200023.

=== Primary Sources ===
- Peter of les Vaux de Cernay (1998) [1212-1218]. Silby, W.A.; Silby, M.D. (eds.). The History of the Albigensian Crusade: Peter of les Vaux-de-Cernay's Historia Albigensis. Suffolk, UK: Boydell & Brewer. ISBN 0-85115-807-2.
- William of Tudela; Anonymous (2000) [1213]. The Song of the Cathar Wars: A History of the Albigensian Crusade. Translated by Shirley, Janet. Burlington, VT: Ashgate Publishing Company. ISBN 9780754603887.
