= Caedite eos. Novit enim Dominus qui sunt eius. =

Latin phrase from the Albigensian Crusade

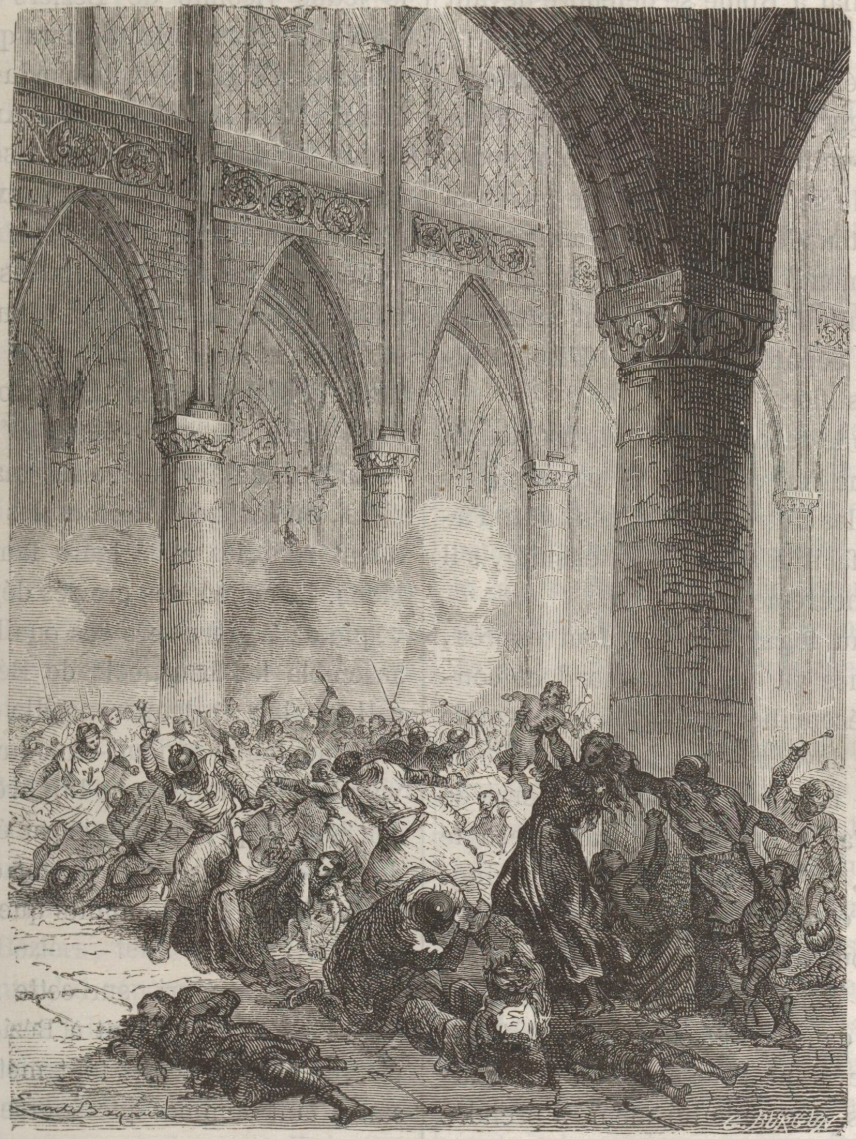
Massacre at Béziers in 1209, the church of Saint Mary Magdalene by Émile Bayard (circa 1867)

"Caedite eos. Novit enim Dominus qui sunt eius." is a Latin phrase reportedly spoken by the commander of the Albigensian Crusade, prior to the massacre at Béziers on 22 July 1209. A direct translation of the Medieval Latin phrase is "Kill them. The Lord knows those that are His". Papal legate and Cistercian abbot Arnaud Amalric was the military commander of the Crusade in its initial phase and leader of this first major military action of the Crusade, the assault on Béziers, and was reported by Caesarius of Heisterbach to have uttered the order.

Less formal English translations have given rise to variants such as "Kill them all; let God sort them out". Some modern sources give the quotation as Neca eos omnes. Deus suos agnoscet, evidently a translation from English back into Latin.

== Background ==
=== Catharism ===
Catharism was a Christian quasi-dualist and pseudo-Gnostic movement which thrived in northern Italy and southern France in the 12th and 13th centuries. They were also pacifists. Catharism represented the first serious threat to the Church in the medieval period. Previous heresies presented little more than irritants to local hierarchies.

=== Albigensian Crusade ===
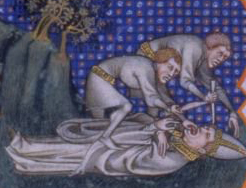
The assassination of Castelnou as depicted in a near-contemporary manuscript

The Albigensian Crusade (Note: The term Albigensian is toponymic for Catharism, due to the southern French town of Albi being one of their main centres.) was initiated in the Kingdom of France at the behest of Pope Innocent III. Its purpose was to crush the growing Cathar movement, a religious sect challenging the teachings of the Catholic Church. The movement flourished mainly in the Languedoc region of what later became Southern France. It was of particular concern to Innocent because it had attracted powerful local lords as patrons who protected the movement, politically and militarily. The Church had made the sect excommunicable in 1198, but it was not until the killing of the papal legate, Pierre de Castelnau (when Innocent felt "personally defied") that it was declared heretical. The Crusaders set out in the summer of 1209.

The town of Béziers had a strong community of Cathars. Commanded by the Papal legate, the Abbot of Citeaux, Arnaud Amalric, the Crusader army reached the outskirts of Béziers on 21 July. They set up camp along the Orb River. By that time, only a small number of residents of the town had chosen to leave. Shortly after, the Bishop of Béziers, Renaud de Montpeyroux, tried to avert bloodshed and to negotiate. He came back to Béziers with the message that the town would be spared provided it would hand over their heretics.

=== Innocent III ===
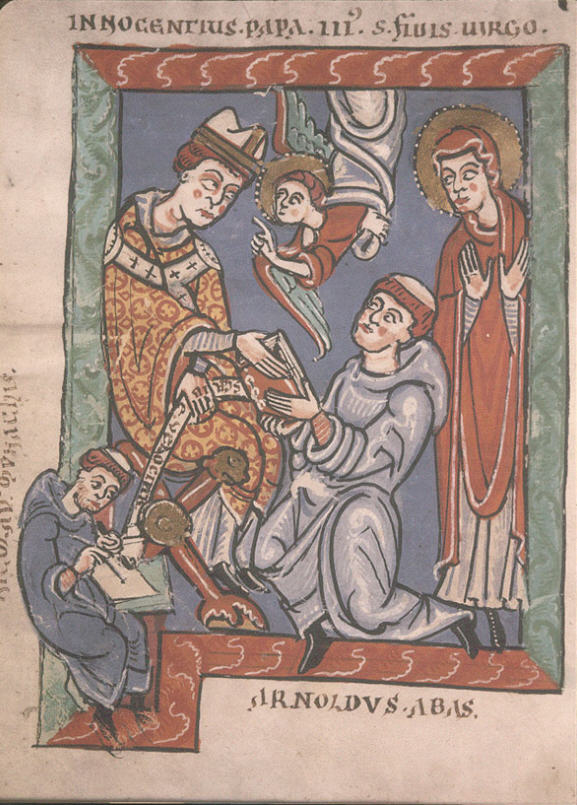
Pope Innocent III (enthroned) and Arnold of Citeaux, kneeling

Pope Innocent III had redesignated wars on heresy as Crusades, in his 1199 decretal Vergentis in senium. This assimilated heresy into Roman Law—treating it as treason against God—and concomitantly provided the lay power with severe penalties to combat it. He had a firm belief in continuous holy war; Pegg suggests that Innocent's "crusading exhortations ... exalted the necessity of cleansing Christendom of Provinciales heretici through expurgation and extermination".

=== Arnaud Amalric ===
(Latin: Arnoldus Amalricus; died 1225), also known as Arnaud Amaury. He was abbot of Poblet in Catalonia from 1196 to 1198, then of Grandselve from 1198 to 1202. He was appointed seventeenth abbot of Cîteaux in. In 1204, he was named a papal legate and inquisitor and was sent by Pope Innocent III with Peter of Castelnau and Arnoul to attempt the conversion of the Albigensians. Failing, he distinguished himself by the zeal with which he incited men by his preaching—"true to the militant spirit of St Bernard" to the crusade against them. He was in charge, both spiritually and militarily, of the crusader army that sacked Béziers in 1209. Contemporary sources imply him to have been stern, uncompromising and a firm believer in the righteousness of his cause. However, although his comment at Bézier has given Amaury a reputation for brutality, on other occasions where he had a similar opportunity to incite a massacre—for example at the Siege of Minerve the following year—he chose not to do so, instead giving the Cathars a chance to abjure their faith. The Latinist Beverly Mayne Kienzle has condemned Amaury for representing "the worst of Cîteaux, an appalling contradiction of monastic spirituality and its ideals of humility, prayer and contemplation".

== At Béziers ==
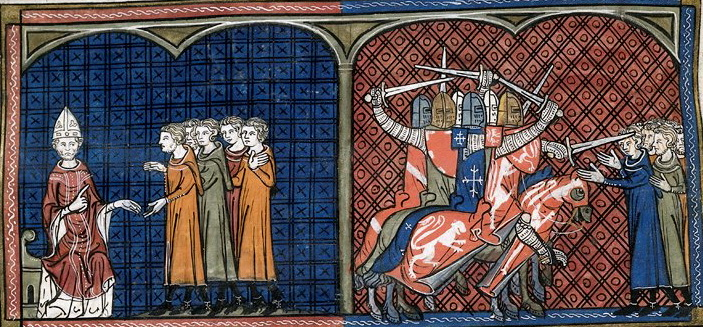
Innocent III excommunicating the Albigensians, left, and their massacre by the crusaders, right

Even before the crusading army arrived, Raymond-Roger, Count of Foix had warned the citizens of Béziers that if they did not surrender, they would be shown no quarter, as a deterrent. Caesarius reports that soon after the ribalds—low status infantry (Note: In a military context, during this period ribalds were low status infantry in feudal armies and urban militias in France and the Low Countries. Outside of battle they performed such duties as manning wagon trains, working siege engines—as at Béziers—and maintaining roads and bridges. In times of peace they acted as general labour—for instance in sanitation and building—for the city. Legally they were non-citizens, "who nonetheless were indispensable to the city’s health and security by doing the dirty, shameful work in the cities’ public spaces and militia".)—placed their escalades against the city walls, they entered the city, and the massacre began. Crusaders then supposedly became concerned that Cathars were mingling with the faithful in order to escape.

Amalric summarised his own views in a letter a few months before Béziers in which he stated that Christendom was threatened on three fronts, "namely, schismatics from the East, heretics from the West, and Saracens from the South". His version of the siege, described in his letter to Pope Innocent III in August 1209, states:

While discussions were still going on with the barons about the release of those in the city who were deemed to be Catholics, the servants and other persons of low rank and unarmed attacked the city without waiting for orders from their leaders. To our amazement, crying "to arms, to arms!", within the space of two or three hours they crossed the ditches and the walls and Béziers was taken. Our men spared no one, irrespective of rank, sex or age, and put to the sword almost 20,000 people. After this great slaughter the whole city was despoiled and burnt ...

Another letter to Innocent reported how the crusading army "fed into the mouth of the sword nearly twenty thousand people, without regard to status, sex, or age". In his manuscript The Dialogue on Miracles, which was written between 1219 and 1223, Caesarius of Heisterbach relates this story about the massacre—briefly—with the papal legate quoted using the words Caedite eos. Novit enim Dominus qui sunt eius. The Crusaders were afraid they would be unable to tell the difference between innocent Christians and the heretics, which prompted Amalric's answer with a "bit of scripture and an important addition".

== Meaning ==
When they discovered, from the admissions of some of them, that there were Catholics mingled with the heretics they said to the abbot "Sir, what shall we do, for we cannot distinguish between the faithful and the heretics." The abbot, like the others, was afraid that many, in fear of death, would pretend to be Catholics, and after their departure, would return to their heresy, and is said to have replied "Kill them all for the Lord knoweth them that are His" and so countless number in that town were slain.

— Caesarius of Heisterbach, Dialogus miracolorum

Marvin comments that "whether the legate actually said those words is a topic at which most scholars have had a crack". He notes that Cistercian monks are known to have accompanied the crusading army, and as such, Caesarius may have had access to eyewitness testimony. Although Caesarius did not state definitively that this sentence had been uttered, he wrote that Amalric "was reported to have said it" (dixisse fertur in the original text). Marvin comments that while it cannot be definitely known whether Amaury spoke those words, "based on what we know of the legate's character, he might have said them". The phrase is certainly reminiscent of the tone of the reports he is known to have dispatched to Rome. There is little if any doubt that these words captured the spirit of the assault—indeed the Languedocian war generally—and that Arnaud and his crusaders planned to kill the inhabitants of any stronghold that offered resistance, wrote William of Tudela. The crusaders (which Arnaud referred to as nostri, "our men") rampaged and killed without restraint. The dead included Bézier's Jewish population, which a contemporary Hebrew chronicle estimated at around 200 people; he calls 1209 the "year of sorrow". (Note: The Hebrew calendar year 4969.) The phrase reflects that "the Crusaders made no distinction between heretics and Catholics or between Christians and Jews", argues medievalist Ram Ben-Shalom. Both Arnaud and Caesarius were Cistercians. Arnaud was the head of the Cistercian Order at the time, so it is unlikely that Arnaud's alleged order as reported by Caesarius was seen at the time as reflecting badly on Arnaud. On the contrary, the incident was included as an exemplum in Caesarius's book on miracles because (to Cistercians at least) it reflected well on Arnaud.

Historian Mark Gregory Pegg has argued that Caedite eos summarises the core principle of the medieval wars on heresy, citing the Bolognese legalist Johannes Teutonicus who wrote in 1217: "If it can be shown that some heretics are in a city, then all the inhabitants can be burnt". It reflects the difficulties the Church traditionally experienced in delineating between heretics and the faithful.

The crusade did not end in 1209, wrote Peter of Vaux-de-Cernay, because—referencing Innocent's belief in continuous holy war—"the Lord in His Compassion did not wish this most holy war to end soon because it providently provided forgiveness for sinners and the enhancement of grace for the just". Amalric remained involved: in 1213 he wrote to Innocent that in Toulouse and environs "like filth sinking into a bilge-hold, the residue of heretical depravity has collected".

== Analysis ==
The Albigensian Crusade was intended to eliminate Catharism, a religious movement denounced by the Catholic Church as heretical. Béziers was not a Cathar stronghold but, according to contemporary Catholic records, home to almost 20,000 baptised Catholics and just over 300 baptised Cathars. Presented with the difficulty of distinguishing Catholics from the Cathars, especially if individuals might misrepresent their own beliefs, the phrase indicated that God would judge those who were killed, and accordingly "sort" them into Heaven or Hell. The phrase suggests an eschatological approach to heresy in the 13th century. However, this in turn contradicts the Church's usual approach to heresy of persuasion and education, and having to involve the civil power in administering justice was effectively a sign of failure. It also reflects the Church's recent argument that not only was much of Languedoc heretical, but, significantly, those who were may not even have been aware of it themselves:

A plea of ignorance was no more than a sign of willful complacency and, in all probability, a symptom of infection. What appeared Catholic and correct on the surface was, so very often, so very cleverly, a facade hiding rampant heretical pestilence.

The phrase contains a reference to the Vulgate version of 2 Timothy 2:19 (Latin: cognovit Dominus qui sunt eius, lit. 'the Lord knows them that are his'). It is often appended by one or more exclamation marks. Roach and Simpson have described the Bézier assault, and Amarlic's response, as "a striking and often-invoked image of medieval persecution". Marvin argues that while the phrase may epitomise the brutality of the campaign, it cannot be blamed for it: "what happened at Béziers cannot be laid at the feet of one man". It has been suggested that the cause was the general circumstances, what psychiatrist Rodrick Wallace calls "the pressures of protracted stress and uncertainty, as well as of time and resource constraints—fog-of-war and friction". Marvin questions the possible influence of Armaric's words: whether Amalric could have seen what was happening beyond the city walls to speak them, or, conversely, whether the ribalds could have heard his remark from within them.

=== Sources ===
Caesarius of Heisterbach is the only primary source for Amauric's statement. However, historians emphasise the shortcomings in his work; he was writing at least 10 and possibly 40 years after the event, and also never went to Languedoc. He wrote in Germany. He was, says Marvin, "far removed from both time and place". (Note: More precisely, the French historian Jacques Berlioz has dated its composition to between 1219–1223.)

Amauric's words, suggests the historian Laurence Marvin, provided the campaign with an "unsavory twist", arguing that Caesarius "has done more to take an uncommon event and place it in the pantheon of horror than any medieval commentator".

A more contemporary source—also Cistercian, also well-informed—Peter of Vaux-de-Cernay, does not mention Amalric's words at all.

== Subsequent events ==
Later events cast doubt on whether Amaury's expression of no quarter was adopted as official policy. Following the Siege of Carcassonne the following month, for example, its citizens were allowed to leave, albeit effectively expelled with nothing more than the shirts on their backs. Indeed, contrary to his alleged statement at Béziers, Amaury threatened to excommunicate any soldier who harmed them as they left. After several military victories, they were able to capture many towns without a fight. After the fall of Carcassonne in August 1209, Amalric was replaced as commander of the crusader force by Simon de Montfort, 5th Earl of Leicester, although Amalric continued to accompany the army.

The crusade against the Cathars was followed by the Inquisition, established in 1233, and by 1350 the movement had been effectively eliminated. It has been estimated that around one million people died, either in battle, massacred, hanged, or burned at the stake.

== In culture ==
Over time, the phrase has entered the common lexicon. It is often—as a result of "lacking sufficient melliflousness"—transmuted into variants of "Kill them all; let God sort them out". (Note: For example, the Loyalist paramilitary leader Johnny Adair, during one of several bouts of imprisonment, was filmed with the slogan on his cell wall; the Irish journalist and author Malachi O'Doherty suggests that Adair may not have known of its Papal origins.)

- Minneapolis attorney Brian Toder has used the phrase to describe the scattergun approach of major record labels in their chain of lawsuits against file sharing in 2003.
- The phrase has been adopted by members of the US military in various conflicts, such as the Vietnam War. In parts of the war on terror, the variant "Kill them all. Let Allah sort them out" has been used. It appeared as graffiti in New York in the aftermath of the World Trade Center bombing, while in 2004 its appearance outside a mosque in Miami was treated by the FBI as a hate crime.
- In Midnight Mass episode 6, this phrase is alluded to when discussing an imminent danger to the townspeople. Bev Keane says, "those who've been coming to church and taking communion–they have nothing to fear tonight. As for the rest of them, let God sort them out."
- On the Marilyn Manson album Antichrist Superstar, the song "Irresponsible Hate Anthem" features the lyrics "Let's just kill everyone, and let your God sort them out!"

The phrase has also been used to summarise a political or military situation in which "all possible targets are enemies; other such examples are the massacres of My Lai, Srebrenica, No Gun Ri, Babi Yar and Żywocice. Wallace describes Amalric's line as illustrating "the Alibensian ground state", expressed as a bloody complicated formula.

== See also ==
- List of Latin phrases
- No quarter
- Salting the earth
