= Battle of Montgey =

1211 battle of the Albigensian Crusade

Battle of Montgey (1211)
- Part of the Albigensian Crusade
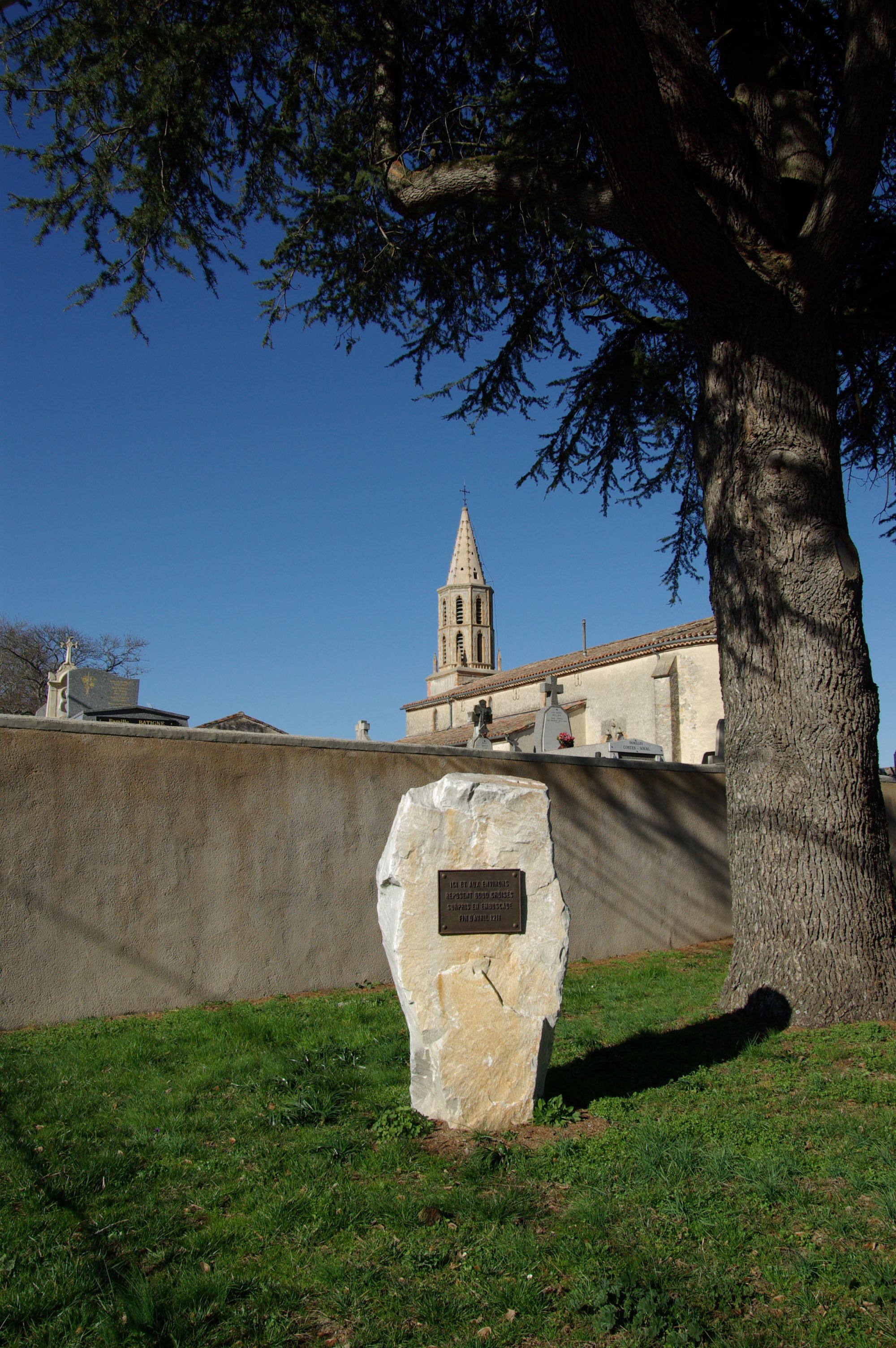
- Plaque in Montgey commemorating the battle
Date	April 1211
Location	Montgey, Occitania
Result	Occitan victory

Belligerents
Crusaders	County of Foix; County of Toulouse

Commanders and leaders
Nicholas of Bazoches †	Raymond-Roger of Foix; Roger-Bernard II; Giraud of Pepieux

Strength
~1500	Unknown

Casualties and losses
Almost total	Negligible

The Battle of Montgey was a military engagement which took place in April 1211 and is considered the first field battle of the Albigensian Crusade. The battle took place in the Occitania region of Southern France near the town of Montgey. A southern force led by Raymond-Roger, Count of Foix ambushed and defeated an army of German and Frisian crusaders on their way to the Siege of Lavaur.

== Background ==
In the Spring of 1211 the leader of the Albigensian Crusade, Simon de Montfort besieged the cathar stronghold of Lavaur. A large force of German and Frisian reinforcements had left the crusader headquarters at Carcassonne and was making its way to the siege at Lavaur. Meanwhile, the Count of Foix, had gathered a raiding party to oppose the crusaders. Aware of the approaching crusader army, Foix prepared an ambush in the forest near the town of Montgey.

== Opposing forces ==
The crusader army was primarily composed of Germans and Frisians led by a knight named Nicholas of Bazoches. William of Tudela writes that the crusaders numbered at least 5,000 but this is considered an exaggeration by modern historians. Marvin considers the figure of 1,500 given by Alberic of Trois-Fontaines to be realistic number. Sumption gives an estimate of "several hundred".

The southern raiding party was led by Raymond-Roger of Foix, his son Roger-Bernard II, and Giraud of Pepieux. While numbers for the southern army are not known, it was composed of knights, mounted sergeants, and a large number of mercenaries. Raymond VI, Count of Toulouse also sent men with the Count of Foix despite ostensibly being an ally to the crusade.

== Battle ==
In the forest near Montgey, Foix ambushed the crusader army, catching them by surprise. Peter of Vaux-de-Cernay writes that the crusaders were not wearing their armor, which Marvin says may indicate that the crusaders were resting or camping at the time. Peter of Vaux-de-Cernay and William of Puylaurens both write that the crusaders were slaughtered, while William of Tudela writes that the crusaders had put on their armor and fought "hard and long". All sources indicate that the crusaders were eventually overwhelmed and almost entirely killed while the southern forces suffered negligible casualties.

After the battle had concluded, the southern army looted the defeated army before quickly riding to Montgisard. Anything that wasn't taken by the southern army was taken by the people of Montgey who also killed some of the remaining survivors. A survivor was able to escape and make his way to Lavaur, where Simon de Montfort was informed of the ambush.

== Aftermath ==
Despite the complete victory achieved by the Count of Foix, the battle had little strategic impact. Montfort led a large mounted force in pursuit of Foix but failed to catch him. While the defeat was a setback, the crusaders were still able to maintain the Siege of Lavaur and take it on the 3rd of May. The defeat at Montgey was likely a contributing factor to the massacres committed against the garrison and people of Lavaur. After Lavaur was taken, Montfort destroyed Montgey in revenge for the ambush.

== Bibliography ==
=== Secondary Sources ===
- Marvin, Laurence W. (2008). The Occitan War: A Military and Political History of the Albigensian Crusade, 1209-1218. Cambridge, UK: Cambridge University Press. ISBN 978-0521123655.
- Evans, Austin P (1962). "VIII THE ALBIGENSIAN CRUSADE". In Wolff, Robert Lee; Hazard, Harry W. (eds.). A History of the Crusades, Volume 2: The Later Crusades. University of Pennsylvania Press. pp. 277–324. ISBN 978-1-5128-2023-2. JSTOR j.ctv4s7mwv.17.
- Sumption, Jonathan (1999). The Albigensian Crusade. London, UK: Faber. ISBN 978-0571200023.

=== Primary Sources ===
- Peter of les Vaux de Cernay (1998) [1212-1218]. The History of the Albigensian Crusade: Peter of les Vaux-de-Cernay's Historia Albigensis. Translated by Silby, W.A.; Silby, M.D. Suffolk, UK: Boydell & Brewer. ISBN 0-85115-807-2.
- William of Tudela; Anonymous (2000) [1213]. The Song of the Cathar Wars: A History of the Albigensian Crusade. Translated by Shirley, Janet. Burlington, VT: Ashgate Publishing Company. ISBN 9780754603887.
- William of Puylaurens (2003) [1200s]. The Chronicle of William of Puylaurens: The Albigensian Crusade and its Aftermath. Translated by Silby, W.A.; Silby, M.D. Suffolk, UK: Boydell & Brewer. ISBN 978-1-84615-043-2.
