= Siege of Carcassonne =

Siege during Albigensian Crusade

Coordinates: 43°12′48″N 2°21′03″E

Siege of Carcassonne (1209)
- Part of the Albigensian Crusade
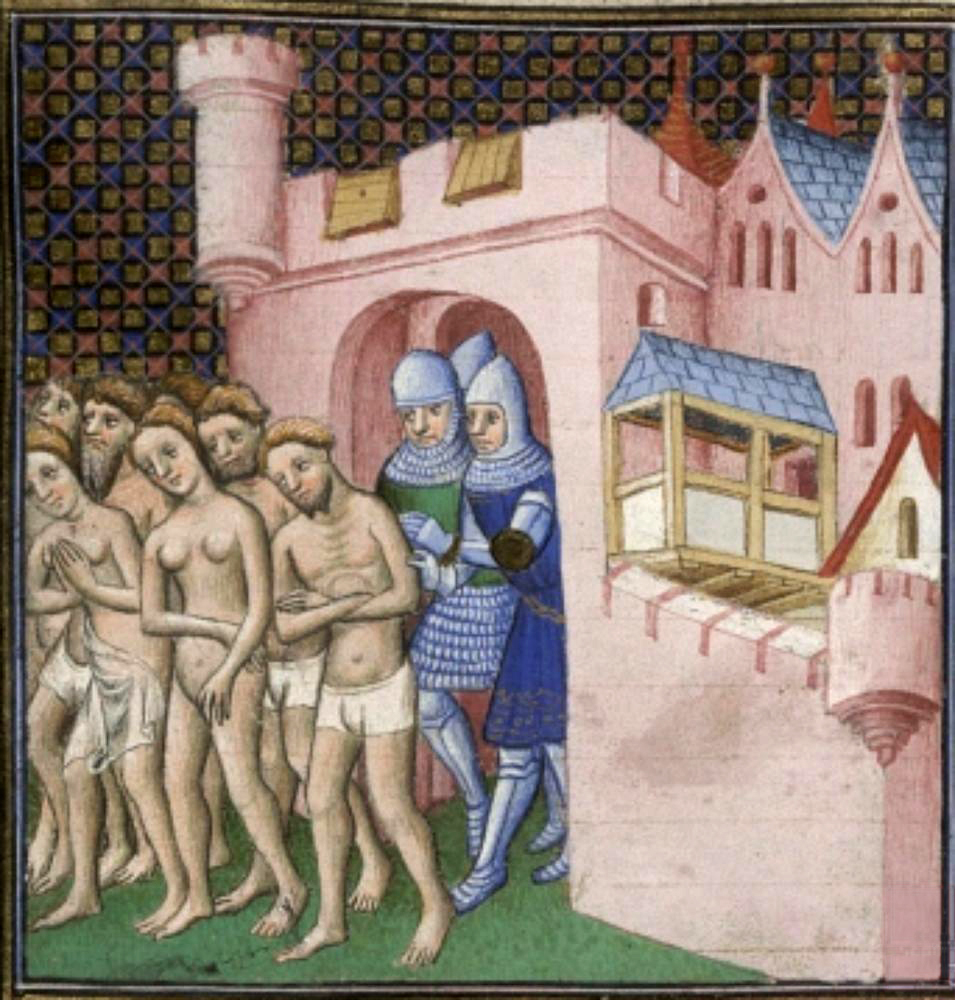
- The inhabitants of Carcassonne are expelled
Date	1 August 1209 – 15 August 1209
Location	Carcassonne, Occitania
Result	Crusader victory

Belligerents
Crusaders	Viscounty of Carcassonne

Commanders and leaders
Arnaud Amaury; Odo III, Duke of Burgundy; Walter III of Châtillon; Hervé IV of Donzy; Peter II of Courtenay; Milo IV, lord of Le Puiset; Simon de Montfort	Raymond Roger Trencavel (POW); Pierre Roger de Cabaret

Strength
~20000	Unknown but substantial

Casualties and losses
Minimal	Minimal

The Siege of Carcassonne was a military engagement which took place from August 1, 1209, to August 15, 1209, during the Albigensian Crusade. It took place in the Languedoc region of southern France at the fortified town of Carcassonne. The Siege was led by Arnaud Amaury as part of the Crusader effort to eliminate Catharism, a Christian sect regarded as heretical, from Southern France. After intense fighting, the siege ended in a negotiated surrender, and the inhabitants were allowed to leave free of harm.

== Background ==
The Albigensian Crusade began in 1209 at the behest of Pope Innocent III in order to eliminate the heretical Christian sect known as Catharism, which had taken root in Southern France. The Crusade was led by the Abbot of Cîteaux, Arnaud Amaury with the assistance of many (primarily French) nobles. The first major action undertaken by the Crusaders was the Siege of Béziers, a short siege that ended with the sacking of the town and the killing of most of its inhabitants. The Crusaders then marched 45 miles to Carcassonne and began the siege 10 days later.

At the time of the siege, Carcassonne consisted of the main town with its castle and three surrounding suburbs. The northern and southern suburbs were both fortified. However the western suburb, which was nearest to the Aude River, was unfortified. The town itself was highly fortified, well positioned, and prepared for a prolonged siege. Its main weakness was its distance from the river, its primary water source.

== Opposing forces ==
The defenders were led by Raymond Roger Trencavel who was the Viscount of Carcassonne as well as Béziers. He was assisted by his vassal, Pierre Roger de Cabaret. As the Crusaders advanced on Béziers, he had begun preparations for a siege at Carcassonne, which included bringing additional reinforcements of knights and sergeants from the countryside and nearby towns.

At this stage the Crusaders were led by Arnaud Amaury and included a host of Crusading nobles such as Simon de Montfort, Odo III, Duke of Burgundy, Walter III of Châtillon, Hervé IV of Donzy, Milo IV, lord of Le Puiset, Peter II of Courtenay, and many more. The size of the Crusader army in 1209 was considered large for its time and is estimated to have been around 20,000 people.

== First phase ==
As the Crusaders approached the town, Raymond Roger Trencavel initially wanted to engage the besiegers in a pitched battle but was dissuaded from this plan by Pierre Roger de Cabaret who convinced the viscount to defend the town from behind its walls rather than attempt a battle in the field. The first assault began on the 3rd of August as the crusader army attacked the Western suburb and succeeding in pushing out the defenders. This allowed them to cut off the town from its main water source.

The Crusaders then assaulted the fortified northern suburb and after 3 days of fighting succeeded in capturing it. The northern suburb was burned to prevent recapture by the defenders. Assaults on the southern suburb were successfully repelled, prompting the attackers to build catapults and mangonels in order to bombard and weaken the walls. They also built a cat (a large, mobile, wooden shelter) which was rolled up to the wall in order to protect sappers who began undermining it. The next day, the mine was collapsed and brought down a portion of the wall, allowing the crusaders to storm and capture the southern suburb. However after most of the attackers moved back to their tents, a sortie made by the defenders killed the small French garrison that was left in the suburb, and set a fire which burned it down.

== Attempted mediation by King Peter II ==
It was at this point in the siege that King Peter II of Aragon arrived to mediate between the two forces, since as the Count of Barcelona, Peter II was also the overlord of Carcassonne. While he was not prepared to assist Raymond-Roger militarily, which would put him at odds with the Pope, he hoped he could save his vassal through diplomatic means. After conferring with both sides, the king failed to reach an agreement. According to William of Tudela, the best agreement Peter II could get from the crusader army was that Raymond-Roger would be allowed to leave with 11 others of his choice. The viscount rejected the offer, preferring to stay and defend his fief. Ultimately, Peter II returned to Spain after it became clear that further negotiations would be unsuccessful.

== Second phase ==
After negotiations had failed, the crusader army prepared to attack the town itself. Cats of various size were built to protect soldiers as they got close to the walls in order to fill the ditches. Meanwhile, crossbowmen on the walls constantly fired at the attackers. While the defenders succeeded in preventing any breach in the walls, their lack of water had become a major concern. They were cut off from their primary water source, suffering from the summer heat, and their wells had dried up. To complicate this, the large garrison and many refugees who sought safety from the oncoming crusaders placed even greater strain on the dwindling water supplies.

== Surrender of Carcassonne ==
Less than a week after Peter II departed, Raymond-Roger agreed to a parlay with the crusader commanders. Both sides knew that the defenders were suffering from a lack of clean water and would not be able to hold out much longer. Knowing that if the crusaders took the town by storm there would likely be a repeat of the massacre at Béziers, the viscount was prepared to negotiate a surrender.

Raymond-Roger voluntarily gave himself up to the crusader army, but was able to secure safe passage for all the inhabitants of the town. The inhabitants of Carcassonne were forced to leave with nothing but the clothes on their backs. The refugees from Carcassonne dispersed into the countryside while Raymond-Roger was imprisoned. He would soon die of dysentery, with rumors circulating that he had been murdered.

== Aftermath ==
With Carcassonne taken and the viscount imprisoned, the viscounty of Carcassonne was now in need of a new lord. Furthermore, the noble and religious crusader commanders recognized the need for a secular leader of the crusade to direct the war effort. The decision was made to choose a leader to grant the conquered land as well as assume the responsibility for the prosecution of the war. The first offers were made to the Duke of Burgundy, the Count of Nevers, and the Count of St. Pol but they all refused. These lords felt that they had plenty of land and did not believe the risk of committing to the crusade indefinitely in order to gain and hold land in hostile territory was worth the effort or risk.

After further deliberation, command of the crusade and the conquered territory was offered to Simon de Montfort. After initial hesitation, he agreed to take command on the condition that all of the assembled lords give their oaths to come to his aid if it was needed. Thus the responsibility and leadership of the crusade had shifted from religious to secular hands. This shift would have significant consequences for the overall purpose and scope of the crusade, as the primary motivation for joining the crusade was changing from religious to political. This was no longer just an opportunity to gain penance and erase heresy, but to conquer and gain land from the lords of Languedoc.

== Bibliography ==
=== Secondary sources ===
- Marvin, Laurence W. (2008). The Occitan War: A Military and Political History of the Albigensian Crusade, 1209-1218. Cambridge, UK: Cambridge University Press. ISBN 978-0521123655.
- Marvin, Laurence W. (2001). "War in the South: A First Look at Siege Warfare in the Albigensian Crusade". War in History. 8 (4). London, UK: SAGE Publications: 373–95. ISSN 0968-3445. JSTOR 26013906.
- Evans, Austin P (1962). "VIII THE ALBIGENSIAN CRUSADE". In Wolff, Robert Lee; Hazard, Harry W. (eds.). A History of the Crusades, Volume 2: The Later Crusades. University of Pennsylvania Press. pp. 277–324. ISBN 978-1-5128-2023-2. JSTOR j.ctv4s7mwv.17.
- Sumption, Jonathan (1999). The Albigensian Crusade. London, UK: Faber. ISBN 9780571200023.

=== Primary sources ===
- Peter of les Vaux de Cernay (1998) [1212-1218]. Silby, W.A.; Silby, M.D. (eds.). The History of the Albigensian Crusade: Peter of les Vaux-de-Cernay's Historia Albigensis. Suffolk, UK: Boydell & Brewer. ISBN 0-85115-807-2.
- William of Puylaurens (2003) [1200s]. The Chronicle of William of Puylaurens: The Albigensian Crusade and its Aftermath. Translated by Silby, W.A.; Silby, M.D. Suffolk, UK: Boydell & Brewer. ISBN 978-1-84615-043-2.
- William of Tudela; Anonymous (2000) [1213]. The Song of the Cathar Wars: A History of the Albigensian Crusade. Translated by Shirley, Janet. Burlington, VT: Ashgate Publishing Company. ISBN 9780754603887.
