= Siege of Toulouse (1211) =

Siege of the Albigensian Crusade

- Part of the Albigensian Crusade
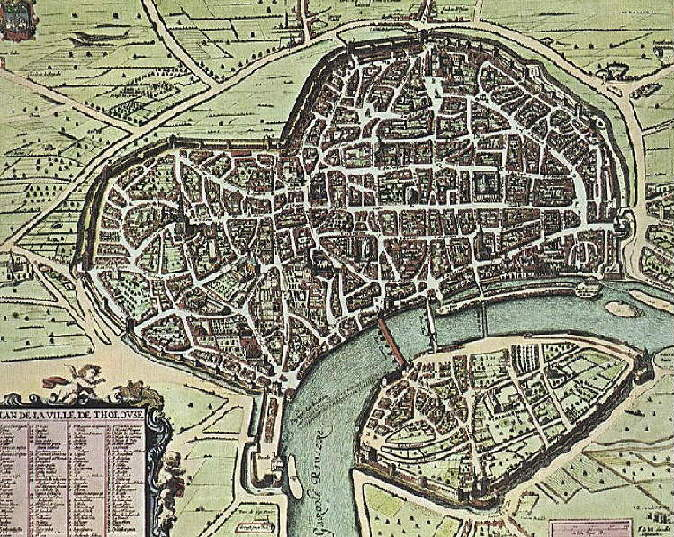
- Map of Toulouse from 1631
Date	17–29 June 1211
Location	Toulouse, County of Toulouse
Result	Occitan victory

Belligerents
Crusaders	County of Toulouse; County of Foix; County of Comminges

Commanders and leaders
Simon de Montfort; Theobald I, Count of Bar	Raymond VI, Count of Toulouse; Raymond-Roger, Count of Foix; Bernard IV, Count of Comminges

Casualties and losses
Negligible	Minimal

The Siege of Toulouse was a military engagement which took place from June 17 to June 29, 1211 during the Albigensian Crusade. It took place in the Occitania region of southern France against the city of Toulouse. The siege was led by Simon de Montfort and was the first of three sieges against Toulouse during the conflict. The siege lasted for almost two weeks before the crusaders were forced to lift the siege due to lack of manpower and supplies.

== Background ==
Following the successful Siege of Lavaur in May of 1211, Simon de Montfort opened hostilities with Raymond VI, Count of Toulouse after discovering that he had covertly helped the defenders of Lavaur. Simon invaded Raymond's territory and burned at least 50 heretics at Les Cassés after the garrison surrendered. He then besieged Montferrand which was held by Raymond VI's younger brother, Baldwin of Toulouse. After three days of siege, Baldwin surrendered and joined Simon de Montfort.

In June, Simon received reinforcements led by Theobald I, Count of Bar and prepared to besiege Toulouse. Up until this point, the loyalties of the citizens of Toulouse were divided between loyalty to their count and to the crusaders. A pro-crusade militia within Toulouse, known as the White Brotherhood, constantly clashed with an anti-crusade militia known as the Black Brotherhood and even helped the crusaders at the Siege of Lavaur. As the crusader army approached, a delegation of Toulousians tried to dissuade Simon from besieging the city, citing their past help and current loyalty, but were unsuccessful.

The Crusaders reached the Hers River on the 16th of June, where a force under the counts of Toulouse, Comminges, and Foix were in the process of dismantling a bridge. The crusaders engaged and after a brief skirmish the southern counts were forced to retreat to the city. The crusader army was able to cross the river and arrived outside Toulouse on the 17th.

== Opposing Forces ==
The crusaders were led by Simon de Montfort and the Count of Bar while the defenders were led by the Count of Toulouse, Count of Comminges, and Count of Foix. The numbers of the combatants involved are unknown but the crusaders were outnumbered by the defenders and only had enough men to blockade one side of the walls. Toulouse was one of the largest cities in the region and Strayer writes that the population exceeded 25,000 people at the time of the siege. Since the Garonne River passed through the city and the crusaders were unable to surround the walls, the defenders did not need to worry about running out of water and were able to replenish food and supplies.

== Siege ==
As the crusaders arrived, they killed 33 peasants just outside the city walls. Soon after, the Count of Bar launched an assault on the walls that began by attempting to fill the ditches around the city while protected by large, mobile shields. The defenders fired projectiles from the walls and rushed from the gates, pushing the attackers back and capturing three of the shields. Contemporary chronicler William of Tudela claimed that more than 100 were killed and 500 wounded during this first assault, a number that Marvin finds plausible. After this failed attack, the besiegers settled in for a longer siege.

The defenders constantly harassed the besiegers by launching assaults on their camp, killing foraging parties, and attacking supply trains. The most notable attack happened on June 27 when two forces came out of the city to attack a supply caravan. One force attacked the crusader camp as a diversion while the other attacked the supply train itself. When the crusaders realized that the supply train was the real target, they rushed to save it. However, as the crusaders arrived the southerners retreated and raided their unprotected camp.

After nearly two weeks of siege, Simon was aware that the siege was hopeless. The crusaders were running low on both food and morale due to the constant sorties by the defenders. On June 29 the crusader army lifted the siege and moved south to ravage the lands of Foix.

== Aftermath ==
The siege was a heavy setback for Simon and the crusaders. In a military sense, it was Simon's first real failure and the reputation he relied on to capture strongholds without a fight was blunted. The demoralized Count of Bar decided to leave the crusade early, lowering morale even further. Most importantly, Simon had turned the initially split population of Toulouse firmly against him. His rejection of negotiations, murder of citizens, and destruction of the farms and fields around the city caused many pro-crusade citizens to become fierce supporters of Raymond VI.

== Bibliography ==
=== Secondary Sources ===
- Marvin, Laurence W. (2008). The Occitan War: A Military and Political History of the Albigensian Crusade, 1209-1218. Cambridge, UK: Cambridge University Press. ISBN 978-0521123655.
- Evans, Austin P (1962). "VIII THE ALBIGENSIAN CRUSADE". In Wolff, Robert Lee; Hazard, Harry W. (eds.). A History of the Crusades, Volume 2: The Later Crusades. University of Pennsylvania Press. pp. 277–324. ISBN 978-1-5128-2023-2. JSTOR j.ctv4s7mwv.17.
- Sumption, Jonathan (1999). The Albigensian Crusade. London, UK: Faber. ISBN 978-0571200023.
- Strayer, Joseph R (1992). The Albigensian Crusades. Ann Arbor, MI: University of Michigan Press. ISBN 978-0472064762.
- Pegg, Mark Gregory (2008). A Most Holy War: The Albigensian Crusade and the Battle for Christendom. New York, NY: Oxford University Press. ISBN 978-0195171310.

=== Primary Sources ===
- Peter of les Vaux de Cernay (1998) [1212-1218]. The History of the Albigensian Crusade: Peter of les Vaux-de-Cernay's Historia Albigensis. Translated by Silby, W.A.; Silby, M.D. Suffolk, UK: Boydell & Brewer. ISBN 0-85115-807-2.
- William of Tudela; Anonymous (2000) [1213]. The Song of the Cathar Wars: A History of the Albigensian Crusade. Translated by Shirley, Janet. Burlington, VT: Ashgate Publishing Company. ISBN 9780754603887.
- William of Puylaurens (2003) [1200s]. The Chronicle of William of Puylaurens: The Albigensian Crusade and its Aftermath. Translated by Silby, W.A.; Silby, M.D. Suffolk, UK: Boydell & Brewer. ISBN 978-1-84615-043-2.
