= Arnaud Amalric =

Cistercian abbot (d. 1225)

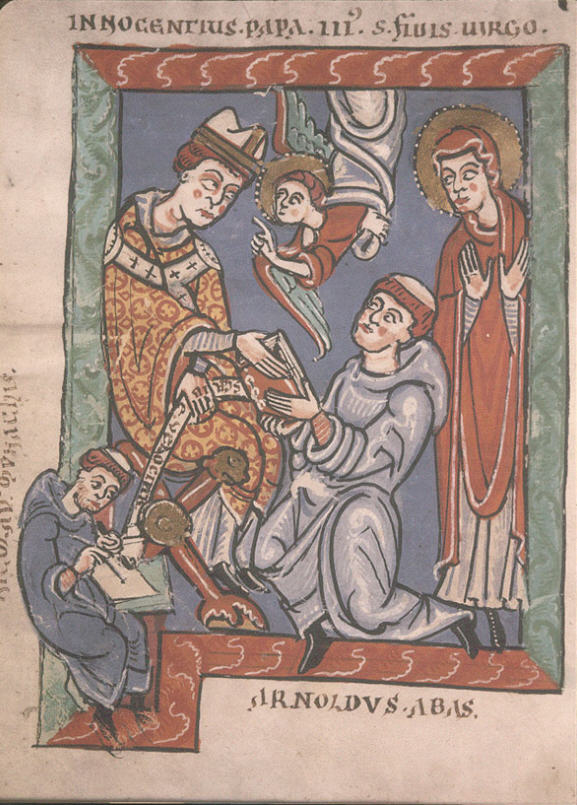
- Arnold Amalric shown kneeling at the throne of Innocent III
- Died: 1225; Fontfroide, France
- Occupations: Cistercian Abbot, Papal Legate and Inquisitor
- Known for: His role in the Albigensian Crusade and the Massacre at Béziers
- Title: Abbot of Poblet, Grandselve, and Cîteaux; Archbishop of Narbonne

Arnaud Amalric (Latin: Arnoldus Amalricus; died 1225), also known as Arnaud Amaury, was a Cistercian abbot who played a prominent role in the Albigensian Crusade. It is purported that prior to the massacre of Béziers, Amalric, when asked how to distinguish Cathars from Catholics, responded, "Kill them [all], for God knows which are His own."

== Early life ==
He was abbot of Poblet in Catalonia from 1196 to 1198, then of Grandselve from 1198 to 1202. He then became the seventeenth abbot of Cîteaux (until 1212).

== Albigensian Crusade ==
In 1204, he was named a papal legate and inquisitor and was sent by Pope Innocent III with Peter of Castelnau and Arnoul to attempt the conversion of the Albigensians. Failing, he distinguished himself by the zeal with which he incited men by his preaching to the crusade against them. He was in charge of the crusader army that sacked Béziers in 1209. There, according to the Cistercian writer Caesarius of Heisterbach, Arnaud responded when asked by a Crusader how to distinguish the Cathars from the Catholics:

Caedite eos. Novit enim Dominus qui sunt eius (Kill them. For the Lord knows who are His.).

This is the origin of the modern phrase: "Kill them all and let God sort them out."

Caesarius did not hear that statement firsthand, but merely wrote that Arnaud was reported to have said it (dixisse fertur in the original text).

This famous response is widely considered apocryphal: according to historian Malcolm Barber “The notorious phrase, ‘kill them all, God will know his own’ ... is usually (although not invariably) discounted by serious historians. However, the quotation is frequently used by those wishing to promote the idea of northern brutality, intent upon crushing southern civilisation ... It is noticeable that most commentators insert “all” for the sake of emphasis and omit fertur dixisse by which Caesarius makes clear that this is hearsay.” Laurence Marvin comments "in 1210 this inflexible and unyielding man gave Cathars who surrendered a fair chance to abjure their heresy and so avoid execution, which heaps more doubt on the credibility of Caesarius’ report."

Conversely, British Cathar historian James McDonald suggests that Caesarius may have only proffered such a caveat in an effort to obtain "plausible deniability." McDonald goes into detailed conjecture to explain why it is just as likely that Arnaud did utter the infamous phrase as it is that he didn't:

More aggressive soldiers of Christ on the battlefield could have found Arnaud’s words wholly admirable, while more reflective theologians safe at home might have had reservations. This would be consistent with the words being spoken by Arnaud, the army commander, and heard by crusaders in the heat of battle, and also with Arnaud the abbot and his crusade chroniclers diplomatically omitting the words from their accounts. Caesarius, an accomplished writer, knew that his Cistercian audience would be impressed by the words, but related the story in such a way as to leave plausible deniability. Only Arnaud’s alleged answer is qualified – Caesarius reports the preceding question about how to distinguish Cathar from Catholic as a fact. The qualifying words fertur dixisse refer only to Arnaud.

Arnaud himself, in a letter to the Pope in August 1209 (col.139), wrote:

...dum tractatetur cum baronibus de liberatione illorum qui in civitate ipsa catholici censebantur, ribaldi et alii viles et inermes personæ, non exspectato mandato principum, in civitatem fecerunt insultum, et mirantibus nostris, cum clamaretur : Ad arma, ad arma, quasi sub duarum vel trium horarum spatio, transcensis fossatis ac muro, capta est civitas Biterrensis, nostrique non parcentes ordini, sexui, vel ætati, fere viginti millia hominum in ore gladii peremerunt; factaque hostium strage permaxima, spoliata est tota civitas et succensa...

...while discussions were still going on with the barons about the release of those in the city who were deemed to be Catholics, the servants and other persons of low rank and unarmed attacked the city without waiting for orders from their leaders. To our amazement, crying "To arms, to arms!" within the space of two or three hours, they crossed the ditches and the walls, and Béziers was taken. Our men spared no one, irrespective of rank, sex, or age, and put to the sword almost 20,000 people. After this great slaughter the whole city was despoiled and burnt...

Amalric's account of the death of 20,000 was likely exaggerated, just like Peter of Vaux de Cernay's report that 7,000 were slain in the Church of St Magdalene. The town's population at the time is estimated at 10,000–14,500, and an unknown number may have escaped the massacre. Christopher Tyerman says that "[t]he true figure was almost certainly far less." Historian Laurence W. Marvin calls Amalric's exhortation "apocryphal", adding that the "speed and spontaneity of the attack indicates that the legate may not have actually known what was going on until it was over". Marvin claims that "clearly most of Beziers' population and buildings survived" and that the city "continued to function as a major population center."

After helping the Crusaders capture Carcassonne, Amalric was replaced as commander of the army by Simon de Montfort, 5th Earl of Leicester. However, he continued to accompany the men and to exercise significant authority. On July 22, the Siege of Minerve concluded when the town's defenders agreed to surrender. Simon and the commander of the defenders, Guilhem de Minerve, agreed to the terms of surrender. However, Amalric, who had been absent at the time, returned to camp. He insisted that no agreements could be considered binding without the assent of himself as papal legate. Simon wished to treat the occupants leniently, but Amalric wanted them put to death. Eventually, the two worked out a solution. The Crusaders allowed the soldiers defending the town, as well as the Catholics inside of it, to leave. The Cathars who had not yet reached the status of perfect were also allowed to go free. The Cathar perfects were given the choice to return to Catholicism or face death. This solution angered many of the soldiers, who had wanted to participate in a massacre. Amalric calmed them by insisting that the majority of perfects would not recant. His prediction was correct. Only three women recanted. The remaining 140 were burned at the stake.

== Later life ==
Amalric was elected archbishop of Narbonne on 12 March 1212, after his return from an expedition into Spain to encourage the Christians against the Moors. He left an account of this expedition. His stirring spirit embroiled him with his overlord, Simon de Montfort. In mid-August 1224, he presided in the council of Montpellier, assembled to consider the complaints of the Albigensians.

It is remarked that, contrary to expectations, he took no part in the ongoing quarrels between the sons of Montfort and Raymond. He wrote his Last Will and Testament on 23 September 1225, and, on 25 September 1225, Amalric died in the Cistercian abbey of Fontfroide, in the diocese of Narbonne (France).

== Bibliography ==
=== Secondary sources ===
- Costen, Michael D. (1997). The Cathars and the Albigensian Crusade. Manchester and New York: Manchester University Press. ISBN 0-7190-4331-X. "sacraments."
- Marvin, Laurence W. (2009). The Occitan War: A Military and Political History of the Albigensian Crusade, 1209-1218. Cambridge, UK: Cambridge University Press. ISBN 978-0521123655.
- J.C.L. Simonde de Sismondi (1973) [1826]. History of the Crusades Against the Albigenses in the Thirteenth Century. New York, NY: AMS Press.
- Smith, Damian J. (2004). Innocent III and the Crown of Aragon: The Limits of Papal Authority. Routledge.
- Strayer, Joseph R. (1971). The Albigensian Crusades. New York, NY: The Dial Press. ISBN 0-472-09476-9.

=== Primary sources ===
- Peter of les Vaux de Cernay (1998) [1212-1218]. Silby, W.A.; Silby, M.D. (eds.). The History of the Albigensian Crusade: Peter of les Vaux-de-Cernay's Historia Albigensis. Suffolk, UK: Boydell & Brewer. ISBN 0-85115-807-2.
