= Guy of Vaux-de-Cernay =

- Bishop of Carcassonne
- Church: Roman Catholic Church
- Diocese: Carcassonne
- Installed: 1212
- Term ended: 1223
- Other post: Abbot of Vaux-de-Cernay (1181–1210)

Orders
- Consecration: 1212

Personal details
- Died: March 21, 1223
- Denomination: Roman Catholic
- Occupation: Cistercian abbot, preacher, bishop

Guy (died 21 March 1223) was the sixth Cistercian abbot of Vaux-de-Cernay from 1181 until 1210 and then the bishop of Carcassonne from 1212 until his death. The crusades dominated his life. He was a preacher, organizer and spiritual leader of the Fourth Crusade, which he abandoned after it turned against fellow Catholics, and also of the Albigensian Crusade against heretics.

Guy's nephew, Peter, also a monk of Vaux-de-Cernay, chronicled his uncle's career in his Hystoria Albigensis. Guy "appears in the sources as a preacher primarily, not a participant in military action."

== Pre-crusading life ==
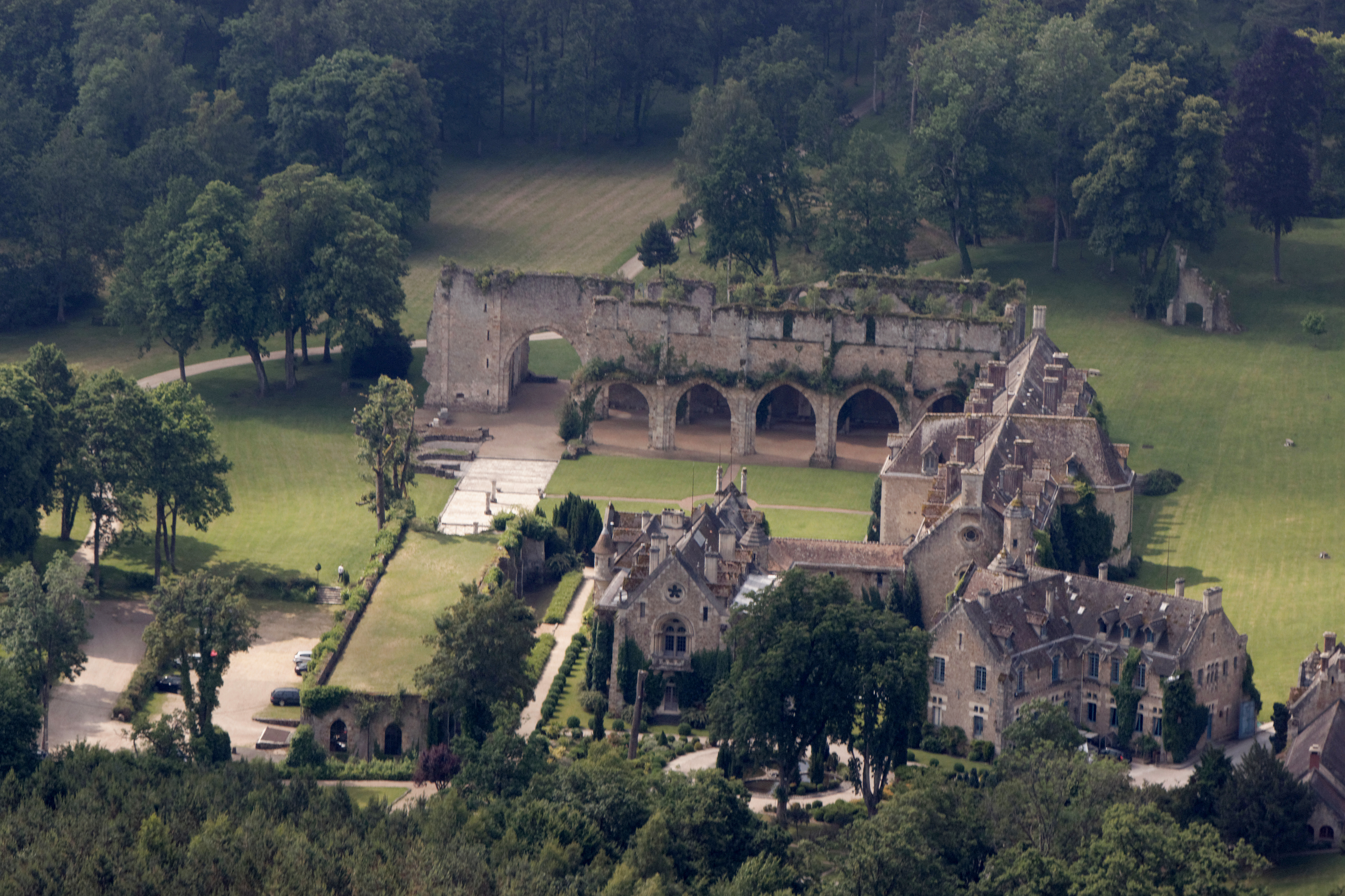
Ruins of Vaux-de-Cernay today

Guy became abbot of Vaux-de-Cernay in 1181. In 1190, King Philip II of France made a donation to the abbey in which he referred to Guy as "our familiaris". He seems to have fallen from favour soon after, since there was no further royal patronage to Vaux-de-Cernay until 1209. It is most likely that Guy sided with the church against the king when the latter pursued a divorce from Ingeborg in 1193.

There is a collection of miracle stories from Vaux-de-Cernay that cites Guy as a source for five of them.

== Fourth Crusade ==
In 1198, Pope Innocent III charged Guy, along with Absalom, abbot of Saint-Victor of Paris, with imposing a tax of a fortieth on ecclesiastical revenues to support the upcoming Fourth Crusade. It was in connection with preparations for this crusade that Guy first worked with Fulk of Neuilly. Guy was one of four Cistercian abbots who joined the crusade "by command of the supreme pontiff, by the entreaties of the marquis and the counts of Flanders and Blois", a decision confirmed by the Cistercian general chapter at Cîteaux in 1201. Guy strongly opposed the decision of the leaders of the crusade—Marquis Boniface of Montferrat, Count Baldwin IX of Flanders and Count Louis of Blois—to attack Zadar and Constantinople.

Guy had connections to Simon IV de Montfort, whose lands bordered those of Vaux-de-Cernay. He spoke on behalf of Simon's contingent when he asserted that they would never participate in an attack on Zadar, which belonged to Hungary. During a meeting of the crusade leadership, he responded to the Doge Enrico Dandolo's demand for an attack by publicly denouncing and forbidding it in the name of the pope. He probably read out to the army Innocent III's letter threatening excommunication on those who participated in any attack on a Christian city. After the siege of Zadar, in April 1203 Guy left the army in the following of Simon de Montfort. He traveled through Hungary and took ship in Italy to complete his pilgrimage to the Holy Land. There is a letter from Stephen of Tournai to the abbot of Cîteaux, Arnaud Amalric, that asks that Guy not be sent back to the Holy Land on account of the physical and mental strain of his experience.

After his return to Vaux-de-Cernay, Guy strengthened his connections to those crusaders who had opposed the siege of Zadar. Four lords who had left the army over the issue made donations to Vaux-de-Cernay between 1206 and 1210. All four also took part in the Albigensian Crusade.

== Albigensian Crusade ==
In the summer of 1206, Guy was one of twelve Cistercian abbots delegated by the general chapter at the request of the pope and the abbot of Cîteaux to root out the Cathar heresy in southern France by preaching. He was still preaching in the spring of 1207. In a papal bull dated 28 March 1208, Innocent III designated Guy as master of preachers in charge of the evangelization efforts. In November 1209, Innocent and Arnaud Amalric both requested Guy's assistance in Carcassonne in the aftermath of the siege of August 1209.

Guy stepped down as abbot in 1210 because of his increasing involvement with the Albigensian Crusade. In that year, after the siege of Minerve, he attempted to preach "words of peace and admonishments for salvation" to the Cathars in their houses. The heretics reportedly rebuffed him with the words, "We don't want your faith. We renounce the Roman Church. You are working in vain. Neither life nor death will call us back from the belief we hold." Guy moved on to preach to a group of women, without success. This is the last recorded instance of Guy preaching to Cathars, but there is no implication in the Hystoria Albigensis that he had any role in the burning of about 140 of them at Minerve.

In the years following the siege of Carcassonne, Guy went on regular trips north to preach the crusade (until 1215), frequently exhorted crusaders before battle and even served a spell as vice legate under Arnaud Amalric. In 1212, he took part as a preacher and on "other duties" in both the siege of Rennes and the siege of Moissac. At the latter he worked closely with the more militarily-minded Archdeacon William of Paris. In 1212, he was consecrated bishop of Carcassonne.

Guy helped construct a bridge in preparation for the siege of Casseneuil in 1214. That same year, during the siege of Carcassonne, Guy led the clergy in singing the Veni Creator Spiritus during the fighting. He also oversaw the demolition of the castle of Montfort after it had been abandoned.

Guy was probably forced to leave Carcassonne when the city was evacuated by the crusaders in January 1223. He died on 21 March 1223, according to the necrology of the cathedral of Carcassonne.

== Sources ==
- Andrea, Alfred J. (1996). "The Anonymous Chronicler of Halberstadt's Account of the Fourth Crusade: Popular Religiosity in the Early Thirteenth Century". Historical Reflections. 22 (2): 447–455, 457–477. JSTOR 41299068.
- Kienzle, Beverly Mayne (2001). Cistercians, Heresy and Crusade in Occitania, 1145–1229: Preaching in the Lord's Vineyard. York Medieval Press.
- Longnon, Jean (1978). Les compagnons de Villehardouin: Recherches sur les croisés de la quatrième croisade. Librairie Droz.
- Marvin, Laurence W. (2008). The Occitan War: A Military and Political History of the Albigensian Crusade, 1209–1218. Cambridge University Press.
- Morize, Louis; Dion, Adolphe de (1889). Étude archéologique sur l'abbaye de Notre-Dame des Vaux de Cernay de l'ordre de Cîteaux et de l'étroite observance. Deslis Frères.
- Queller, Donald E.; Compton, Thomas K.; Campbell, Donald A. (1974). "The Fourth Crusade: The Neglected Majority". Speculum. 49 (3): 441–465. doi:10.2307/2851751. JSTOR 2851751.
