= Siege of Toulouse =

There have been several sieges known as the siege of Toulouse, among them:

- Siege of Toulouse (721)
- Siege of Toulouse (767)
- Siege of Toulouse (864)
- Siege of Toulouse (1159)
- During the Albigensian Crusade:
  - Siege of Toulouse (1211)
  - Siege of Toulouse (1216)
  - Siege of Toulouse (1217–18)
