= Siege of Minerve =

Part of Albigensian Crusade

- Part of Albigensian Crusade
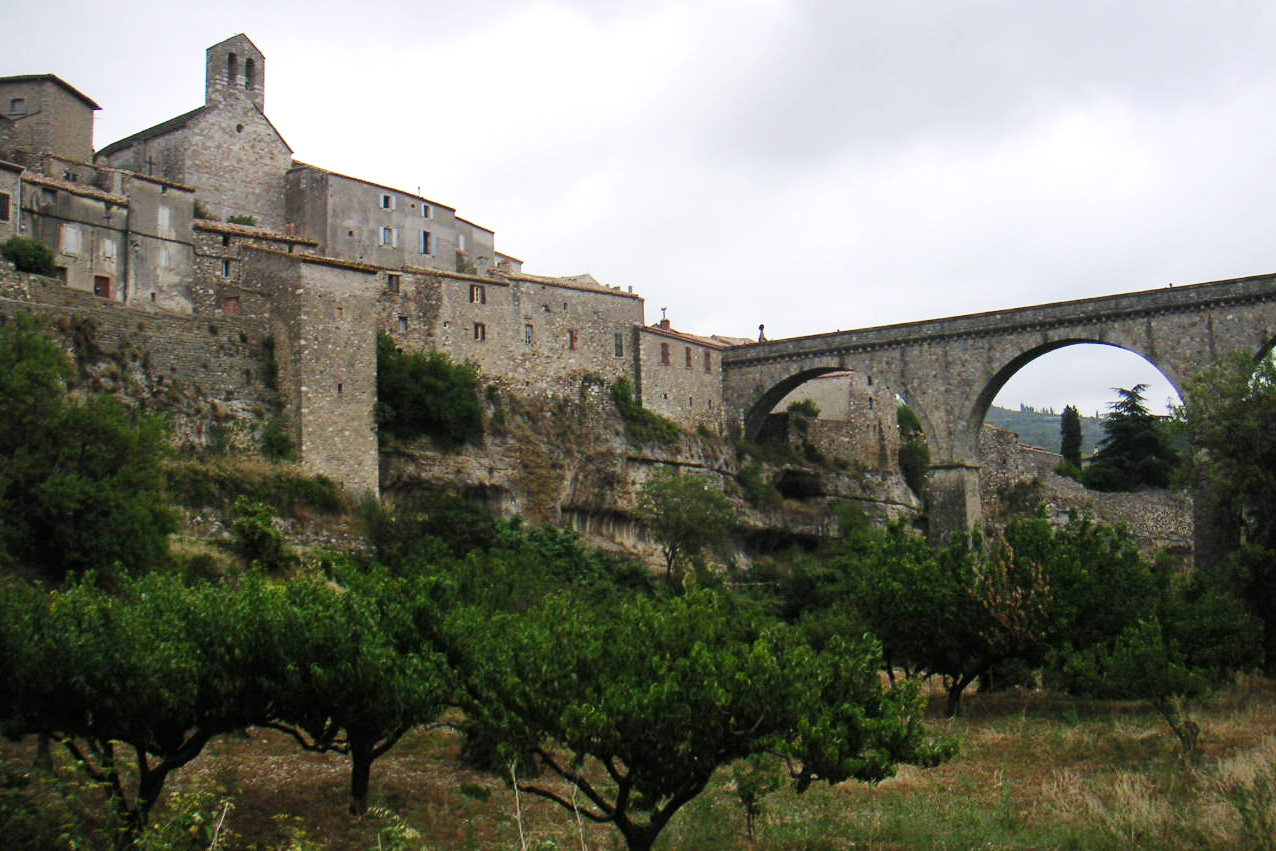
- The bridge at Minerve
Date	Early June – 22 July 1210
Location	Minerve, Hérault
Result	Crusader victory

Belligerents
Crusaders	Cathars

Commanders and leaders
Simon de Montfort; Arnaud Amalric	Guilhem de Minerve

Casualties and losses
Unknown	Unknown amount killed during siege 140 Cathars burned to death

The siege of Minerve was a military engagement which took place in June and July 1210 during the Albigensian Crusade in the town of Minerve in southern France. It was undertaken by the Catholic Crusaders against the Cathars in southern France, who were regarded as a heretical sect. The Crusaders, led by French nobleman Simon de Montfort, besieged and captured the town. The Crusaders allowed the soldiers defending the town, Catholics, and any Cathars who had not yet reached the status of perfect to go free. Three Cathar perfects who repented were pardoned, but 140 others who refused to do so were burnt at the stake.

== Background ==
The Albigensian Crusade was initiated in the Kingdom of France at the behest of Pope Innocent III. Its purpose was to squash the growing Cathar movement, which flourished mainly in the Languedoc region of what later became Southern France. The immediate cause was the killing of the papal legate, Pierre de Castelnau. The Crusaders set out in the summer of 1209. After several military victories, they were able to capture many towns without a fight. After the fall of Carcassonne, papal legate Arnaud Amalric, who had led troops during the Massacre at Béziers, was replaced as commander of the Crusader force by Simon de Montfort, 5th Earl of Leicester, although Amalric continued to accompany the army.

Minerve was a well-fortified city. It is located at the confluence of the Cesse and Brian rivers, which has cut deep ravines in the nearby area. It was also one of the largest towns in the Languedoc, situated near the Mediterranean coast. Minerve was a small castra deep in the mountains, and thus not of major strategic importance to the military. However, it had become an important place of refuge for Cathar perfectus and taking it would thus increase the authority of both Simon as count and the Catholic Church in the area, which seems to have influenced Simon's decision to attack the city.

In the winter of 1209-1210, large offensives ceased on account of the weather and small size of the Crusader army. In March and April, the Crusaders conducted successful raids against food sources near Minerve, capturing many important areas nearby and effectively isolating the city.

== Siege ==
In early June, the Crusader army besieged Minerve. The town was commanded by Lord Guilhem de Minerve. Unable to feed his army exclusively from the agricultural area around the town, Simon imported supplies from areas many miles away, such as Carcassonne.

The steep gorges surrounding the town made it virtually impossible to storm. However, the gorges were also very narrow, making a bombardment more practical. Simon realized this and decided to use his artillery to capture Minerve. The Crusaders relied effectively upon siege equipment. Simon made his headquarters east of the town, where a crew lobbed heavy objects into the walls of the town. On the west, a rock thrower called a petraria (trebuchet) was used, in one of its earliest appearances in Europe. This machine, named mala vazina ("Bad Neighbor"), bombarded the town very heavily, partially destroying Guilhelm's home, and towards the end of June destroying the main wall of the city. The defenders held on for several more weeks, but the occupants began to run low on water. On 22 July the city surrendered. Laurence Marvin calls Simon's techniques an example of "a skillful use of siege warfare to take castles in geographically hostile conditions."

Simon and Guilhem de Minerve agreed to terms of surrender. However, Amalric, who had been absent at the time, returned to camp. He insisted that no agreements could be considered binding without the assent of himself as papal legate. Simon wished to treat the occupants leniently, but Amalric wanted them put to death. Eventually, the two worked out a solution. The Crusaders allowed the soldiers defending the town, as well as the Catholics inside of it, to leave. The Cathars who had not yet reached the status of perfect were also allowed to go free. The Cathar perfects were given the choice to return to Catholicism or face death. This solution angered many of the soldiers, who had wanted to participate in a massacre. Amalric calmed them by insisting that the majority of perfects would not recant. His prediction was correct.

The soldiers entered the town singing Te Deum, while the Cathars, segregated male and female, knelt in prayer. The abbot Guy of Vaux-de-Cernay began to preach the Catholic faith to the men. He was interrupted and told, "We will have none of your faith. We have renounced the Church of Rome: your labor is in vain; for neither death nor life will make us renounce the opinions that we have embraced." The abbot then went to the women, who even more stubbornly refused to convert. Simon also urged both groups to abandon their Cathar faith. "Be converted to the Catholic faith," Simon said. Gesturing to the collection of dry wood that had been assembled, he continued, "Or ascend this pile." Ultimately, only three women repented. The 140 people who refused were burned at the stake. Some Cathars chose to jump freely into the flames rather than wait for their executioners.

Cistercian monk Peter of Vaux-de-Cernay records two miracles which allegedly took place during the siege of Minerve. In one instance, a spring from which very little water flowed began to gush water shortly after the Crusaders arrived for the siege. Afterwards, it was reduced once again to a trickle. In the other, as the Crusaders were leaving, they set fire to all the huts which they had made out of branches and dry leaves. One hut, in which a priest had said Mass, while in close proximity to the others, was somehow spared from the flames.

== Aftermath ==
After the Cathars had been burnt, their bodies were buried in shallow mud graves. The Crusaders continued their campaign against the Cathars, capturing many more towns. The siege of Termes came directly after.

== Bibliography ==
=== Secondary sources ===
- Barber, Malcolm (2014) [2000]. The Cathars: Christian Dualists in the Middle Ages. New York, NY: Routledge. ISBN 978-0-582-256613.
- Costen, Michael D. (1997). The Cathars and the Albigensian Crusade. Manchester and New York: Manchester University Press. ISBN 0-7190-4331-X. "sacraments."
- Falk, Avner (2010). Franks and Saracens: Reality and Fantasy in the Crusades. London, UK: Karnac Books, Ltd. ISBN 978-1-85575-733-2.
- Graham-Leigh, Elaine (2005). The Southern French Nobility and the Albigensian Crusade. Suffolk, UK: Boydell & Brewer. ISBN 1-84383-129-5.
- Marvin, Laurence W. (2008). The Occitan War: A Military and Political History of the Albigensian Crusade, 1209-1218. Cambridge, UK: Cambridge University Press. ISBN 978-0521123655.
- O'Callaghan, Joseph (1998). On the Social Origins of Medieval Institutions: Essays in Honor of Joseph F. O'Callaghan (The Medieval Mediterranean, No 19). Boston, MD: Vann-Leiden. ISBN 978-9004110960.
- Oldenbourg, Zoe (1961). Massacre at Montsegur: A History of the Albigensian Crusade. Pantheon Books. ISBN 1-84212-428-5.
- J.C.L. Simonde de Sismondi (1973) [1826]. History of the Crusades Against the Albigenses in the Thirteenth Century. New York, NY: AMS Press.
- Strayer, Joseph R. (1971). The Albigensian Crusades. New York, NY: The Dial Press. ISBN 0-472-09476-9.

=== Primary sources ===
- Peter of les Vaux de Cernay (1998) [1212-1218]. Silby, W.A.; Silby, M.D. (eds.). The History of the Albigensian Crusade: Peter of les Vaux-de-Cernay's Historia Albigensis. Suffolk, UK: Boydell & Brewer. ISBN 0-85115-807-2.
- William of Tudela; Anonymous (2004) [1213]. The Song of the Cathar Wars: A History of the Albigensian Crusade. Translated by Shirley, Janet. Burlington, VT: Ashgate Publishing Company. ISBN 9781351881715.
