= Battle of Muret =

Part of the Albigensian Crusade

- Part of the Albigensian Crusade
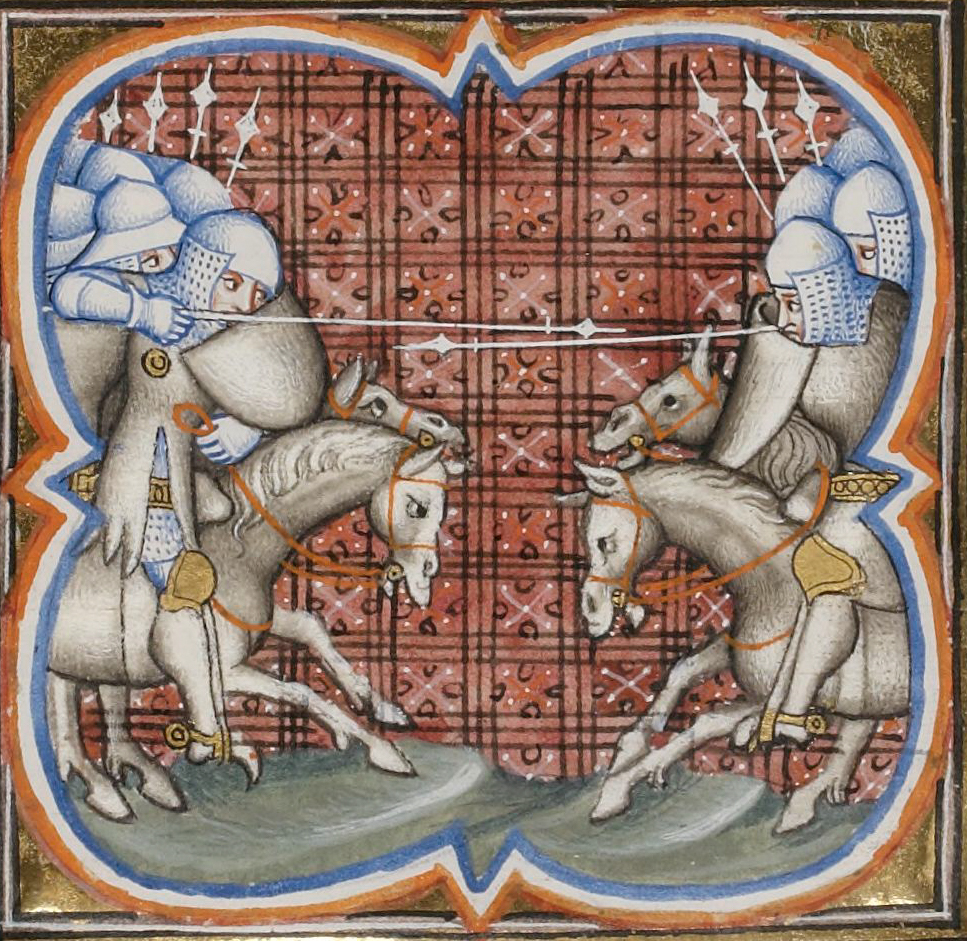
- The Battle of Muret: illustration from the Grandes Chroniques de France, c. 1375–1380
Date	12 September 1213
Location	Muret, France 43°28′N 1°20′E
Result	French Crusader victory

Belligerents
Kingdom of France; Northern French Crusaders	Crown of Aragon; County of Toulouse; County of Comminges; County of Foix; Viscounty of Carcassonne

Commanders and leaders
Simon de Montfort the Elder: Bouchard de Marly; Guillaume des Barres; Guillaume de Contres	Peter II of Aragon †; Raymond VI, Count of Toulouse; Raymond-Roger, Count of Foix

Strength
1,000–1,700 men: 240–260 knights; 500–700 mounted sergeants; 300–700 infantry	Modern estimates: No more than 10,000 fighting men 16,900–22,100 men 4,000–8,000 men: 1,000–2,000 Aragonese and Catalan knights and mounted sergeants; 1,000–2,000 Occitan knights and mounted sergeants; Several thousand infantry

Casualties and losses
Light (less than 100 total casualties): Reportedly only 4 or 9 killed (1 knight and 3 or 8 sergeants)	Many thousands killed (King Peter II included); Unknown wounded or captured

The Battle of Muret (Occitan: Batalha de Murèth), fought on 12 September 1213 near Muret, 25 km (16 mi) south of Toulouse, was the last major battle of the Albigensian Crusade and one of the most notable pitched battles of the Middle Ages. Although estimates of the sizes of the respective armies vary considerably even among distinguished modern historians, it is most well known for a small force of French knights and crusaders commanded by Simon de Montfort the Elder defeating a much larger allied army led by King Peter II of Aragon and Count Raymond VI of Toulouse.

Like Hastings and Bouvines, Muret is regarded as one of the most decisive tactical victories of the High Middle Ages and a much more complete victory than the first two. It showed Montfort had no equal as a battlefield commander, having now after his previous exploits defeated, against all odds, a man whose status as a sovereign king, general and crusader matched or exceeded the Frenchman's own reputation. Charles Oman described the battle as the most remarkable triumphs ever won by a force entirely composed of cavalry over an enemy that used both horse and foot.

The death of Peter II and the heavy loss of life among the Aragonese nobility had permanent political consequences in the region. The outcome of the battle removed Aragonese influence over the Languedoc and its surrounding provinces and allowed the Crown of France to assert its own control over them, which led to an expansion of the French royal domain further south.

== Background ==
Simon IV de Montfort was the leader of the Albigensian Crusade aimed at destroying Catharism and bringing the Languedoc under Capetian control. He invaded County of Toulouse and exiled its count, Raymond VI. Count Raymond sought assistance from his brother-in-law, King Peter II of Aragon, who felt threatened by Montfort's conquests in Languedoc. He decided to cross the Pyrenees and to deal with Montfort at Muret.

On 10 September, Peter's army arrived at Muret, and was joined by contingents from Languedoc led by Raymond and other southern French lords. Peter chose to position his army so their right flank was protected by the Saudrune River, and the left by a marsh. He tasked the Toulousain militia with assaulting the walls of the city.

== Armies ==
The contemporary sources' estimates of the size of Montfort's army do not cause much controversy and are generally supported by modern historians. According to Laurence Marvin, Simon de Montfort led an army of 1,000–1,700 French Crusaders, including a small contingent of knights brought by his ally, the Viscount of Corbeil. Montfort had 900 cavalry, of which 260 were knights. His 300–700 infantry stayed behind at Muret to hold the town. Spencer C. Tucker specifically gives 700 infantry and 900 cavalry under Simon de Monfort for a total of 1,600 men, which is fairly close to the former author's higher estimates. These estimates of 1,600 to 1,700 French cavalry and infantry are also given by many other noted historians. DK, while giving similar estimates about the number of cavalry, list the number of infantrymen at 1,200, for a total of 2,100 men.

Estimates about the number of troops in the allied army vary considerably as contemporary sources were not remotely credible. It is not a matter of controversy that Peter II and his Aragonese and Catalan army were joined by southern lords and their respective forces. However, Pierre des Vaux de Cernay, the primary contemporary source about the battle, puts the total allied army at an impossible 100,000 men and claims casualties to have numbered as high as 20,000. Marvin, referencing the estimates of Ferdinand Lot and Martin Alvira Cabrer, states that Peter of Aragon brought 800 to 1,000 Aragonese cavalry, joined by 2,000–4,000 militia infantry from Toulouse and cavalry from the counts of Comminges and Foix. Peter's combined forces possibly numbered 2,000–4,000 cavalry and 2,000–4,000 infantry; 4,000 to 8,000 men in total are also given by Clifford J. Rogers. Charles Oman, however, states there may have been 1,900 to 2,100 total allied horsemen and 15,000 to 20,000 infantry, of which the burgess militia of Toulouse must have formed the most solid portion. Oman thus implied the allied infantry ranks were not exclusively filled with Toulousain militiamen, pointing out that at the news of Peter's approach, the men of Languedoc took arms on all sides and the Counts of Toulouse and Foix were able to assemble a "large army" beneath their banners. Spencer Tucker expressed that Monfort's first two battles may have been outnumbered by "as much as 30 to 1" when Montfort and his third battle of 300 men circled out of sight of the besiegers to flank them. If Montfort's third battle consisted of 300 knights and mounted sergeants, the combined first two battles numbered 600 men to form the 900 cavalry, which would place the allied army at 18,000 men in total. These perfectly fit in Oman's estimates of 16,900 to 22,100 allied troops. Considerably higher estimates of 4,000 allied cavalry and 30,000 allied infantry are also shared by the British publisher DK, which seem extremely high as anything above 10,000 fighting men is deemed exceedingly non-credible by Jonathan Sumption.

== Battle ==
Montfort led his knights and horse sergeants out of the walled town and divided his cavalry army into three lines, with his half-brother William of Barres commanding the first line and Montfort himself commanding the third for purposes of tactical command and control. King Peter had arranged his men in the same formation, with the Count of Foix commanding the first line and the King disguising himself in a borrowed suit of armor in the second line. Once deployed, Peter's army remained stationary and waited for the Crusaders' approach.

Crossing a stream, William of Barres' cavalry rode for the center of the Count of Foix's line, with the second Crusader line following him. The coalition's first line was crushed by the impetus of the charge and the Crusaders broke through to the second. At the same time, Montfort maneuvered his unit to outflank the coalition cavalry from the left and crashed into them. Confused and disorganized, the coalition cavalrymen began to retreat.

King Peter may have been killed in the initial clash or the Crusaders may have headed for his standard in the second line during the battle, seeking to kill him. According to one contemporary account, he shouted "Here is your King!", but was not heard. Knowledge of his death contributed to the rout of his army.

Montfort's first two lines pursued the defeated coalition cavalry, while Montfort himself rallied his third line and kept them in reserve in case the pursuers encountered resistance. This proved unnecessary, as the fleeing cavalrymen put up no such effort.

Montfort then returned to the besieged Muret. The militia from Toulouse renewed their assault on the city. When they saw the Crusader horsemen returning and learned that King Peter of Aragon had been killed, they broke and fled their fortified camp toward the Garonne River but were slaughtered in the rout.

Course of the battle

== Aftermath ==
This would be the last major battle of the Albigensian Crusade, which did not officially end until the 1229 Treaty of Paris. In addition, with de Montfort's victory as well as the death of King Peter, the ambitions of Aragon in Languedoc were effectively ended.

== Bibliography ==
=== Secondary sources ===
- (in French) Martín Alvira-Cabrer, Muret 1213. La bataille décisive de la croisade contre les Albigeois, Vent Terral, Valence d'Albigeois, 2024. ISBN 978-28-592-7131-2
- (in Spanish) Martín Alvira-Cabrer, El Jueves de Muret. 12 de Septiembre de 1213, Universitat de Barcelona, Barcelona, 2002. ISBN 84-477-0796-2
- Alvira-Cabrer, Martín (2008). Muret 1213. La batalla decisiva de la Cruzada contra los Cátaros (in Spanish). Ariel, Barcelona. ISBN 978-84-344-5255-8.
- Marvin, Laurence W. (2009). The Occitan War: A Military and Political History of the Albigensian Crusade, 1209–1218. Cambridge: Cambridge University Press. ISBN 978-0521123655.
- Jonathan Sumption. The Albigensian Crusade, 2000
- Tucker, Spencer C., ed. (2010). A Global Chronology of Conflict: From the Ancient World to the Modern Middle East. Vol. I. ABC-CLIO.
- Hoffman Nickerson, Warfare in the Roman Empire, the Dark and Middle Ages, to 1494 A.D., 1925
