= Clemens Blume =

Jesuit hymnologist

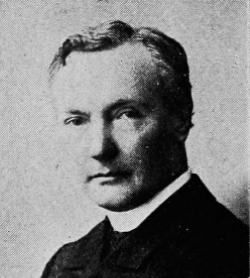
- Born: 31 January 1862; Haguenau, Alsace
- Died: 1932 (aged 69–70); Chicago, Illinois
- Occupation: Hymnologist

Clemens Blume (31 January 1862 - 1932) was a Jesuit hymnologist.

== Biography ==
Clemens Blume was born in Billerbeck on 31 January 1862. He was educated at the Jesuit gymnasium, Feldkirch, Austria, Jesuit scholasticates in the Netherlands and England and the universities of Prague and Bonn. He entered the Society of Jesus in 1878, was gymnasium professor at Feldkirch in 1887-90 and ordained priest in 1893. He devoted himself to hymnological research, visiting most of the libraries of Europe. With Guido M. Dreves, he was coeditor of Analecta Hymnica medii ævi (1896–1905), and editor of Analecta Hymnica medii ævi (consisting of 57 volumes).

He is author of Das Apostolische Glaubensbekenntnis (1893), Repertorium Repertorii oder kritischer Wegweiser durch Ul. Chevalier's Repertorium Hymnologicum (1901), Wolstan von Winchester und Vital von Saint Evroult (1903), Cursus S. Benedicti Nursini und die liturgische Hymnen des 6.-9. Jahrhunderts (1908), Ein Jahrtausend lateinischer Hymnendichtung, Eine Blutenlese aus den Analecta Hymnica (1909), Ursprung des Ambrosianischen Lobgesanges (1912). He collaborated in Buchberger's Kirchliches Handlexikon and contributed to Stimmen aus Maria-Laach, Die Kirchenmusik and the Catholic Encyclopedia.

== Works ==
- Repertorium Repertorii. Kritischer Wegweiser durch U. Chevalier's Repertorium Hymnologicum, Leipzig, 1901.
- Der Cursus S. Benedicti Nursini und die liturgischen Hymnen des 6.-9. Jahrhunderts in ihrer Beziehung zu den Sonntags- und -Ferialhymnen unseres Breviers. Eine hymnologisch-liturgische Studie auf Grund handschriftlichen Quellenmaterials, Leipzig, 1908.
- Unsere Liturgischen Lieder. Das Hymnar der altchristlichen Kirche, Regensburg, 1932.
