= Arnulf of Leuven =

Cistercian abbot (c. 1200–1250)

Arnulf of Leuven (c. 1200–1250) was the abbot of the Cistercian abbey in Villers-la-Ville. After serving in this office for ten years, he abdicated, hoping to pursue a life devoted to study and asceticism. He died within a year. Little else is known.

== Work ==
He compiled the first volume of the annals of the Villers Abbey (1146–1240). However, his primary significance is as a poet. His "Excerptum Speculi Caritatis" is a verse adaptation of the "Summa Causum" of Raymond of Peñafort. Arnulf is also the probable author of the Membra Jesu Nostri, a cycle of seven poems, each a meditation on one of the wounds of the crucified Christ. In the 17th century, Paul Gerhardt wrote an adaptation in German, which became "O Sacred Head, Now Wounded" in English.

These poems were ascribed to Bernard of Clairvaux, for they are consistent with his spirituality. However, "the external proof for this ascription is so slight as to be negligible" (Hurlbut, VII, 18). The "Membra Jesu Nostri" did appear in Bernard's collected works, but only beginning two hundred years after his death. When the monasteries were suppressed in the French Revolution, all of the relevant manuscripts disappeared. A manuscript of 1320 attributes the authorship of five cycle to Arnulf of Leuven.

== Sources ==
- Deves, Guido Maria and Blume, Clemens. Ein Jahrtausend Lateinischer Hymnendichtung. O. R. Reisland: Leipzig, 1909.
- Hurlbut, Stephen A., e.d. Hortus Conclusus: A Series of Mediaeval Latin Hymns With Selected English Renderings." St. Albans: Washington, D.C. 1936.
- Marlies Lehnertz: Vom hochmittelalterlichen katholischen Hymnus zum barocken evangelischen Kirchenlied. Paul Gerhardts „O Haupt voll Blut und Wunden“ und seine lateinische Vorlage, das „Salve caput cruentatum“ Arnulfs von Löwen. In: Hansjakob Becker, Reiner Kaczynski (Ed.): Liturgie und Dichtung. Ein interdisziplinäres Kompendium. Band 1: Historische Präsentation. EOS, St. Ottilien 1983, ISBN 3-88096-281-2, (Pietas Liturgica 1), S. 755–773.
- Unknown. Biographie Nationale de Belgique, 1866, I, 469.
- Unknown. Histoire Littéraire des Pays Bas, 1769, XVI, 52–58.
