= Baldwin of Toulouse =

Occitan noble (1165–1214)

Baldwin of Toulouse (1165–1214) was the youngest son of Count Raymond V of Toulouse and Princess Constance of France.

== Biography ==
Baldwin spent his youth at the French Court with his mother, after she had separated from his father. It was not until the death of his father in 1194 that he went to Toulouse. His brother Raymond VI received him badly, fearing having to share his father's inheritance, and went so far as to contest Baldwin's birth. But Baldwin's conciliatory nature won out, and he was granted Bruniquel as a fief, and made him guardian of his son in his will.

In 1211, Raymond entrusted him with the castle of Montferrand to defend against the army of Simon de Montfort who led the Albigensian Crusade. He repelled Simon's first attacks, despite small numbers, but realized that he would not succeed in resisting a long siege. He then negotiated with Simon, whom he recognized from court, and obtained the surrender of the castle in exchange for the lives of the inhabitants and freedom for the defenders. However, when he returned to Toulouse, his brother violently reproached him for having lost the castle and Baldwin decided to join the crusader army. Simon gave him custody of the castle of Saint-Antonin.

Baldwin participated in several campaigns led by de Montfort, and particularly in the Battle of Muret in 1213. After the battle, he returned to his estate in Quercy. Two relatives of the Count of Toulouse took him prisoner in his castle of Lolmie, near Montcuq and delivered him to Raymond VI who was in Montauban. His brother had him hanged as a traitor in February 1214. The peace negotiated by Pope Innocent III prevented Simon de Montfort from avenging his death.

== Family ==
Baldwin had married Alix, daughter and heiress of Sicard V, Viscount de Lautrec and Adélaïde de Béziers.

Traditionally, he was thought to be the progenitor of the extant House of Toulouse-Lautrec, however, recent DNA research has found that they are paternally descendants of the ninth century counts of Albi.
