= Coustaussa =

Commune in Occitanie, France

- Commune
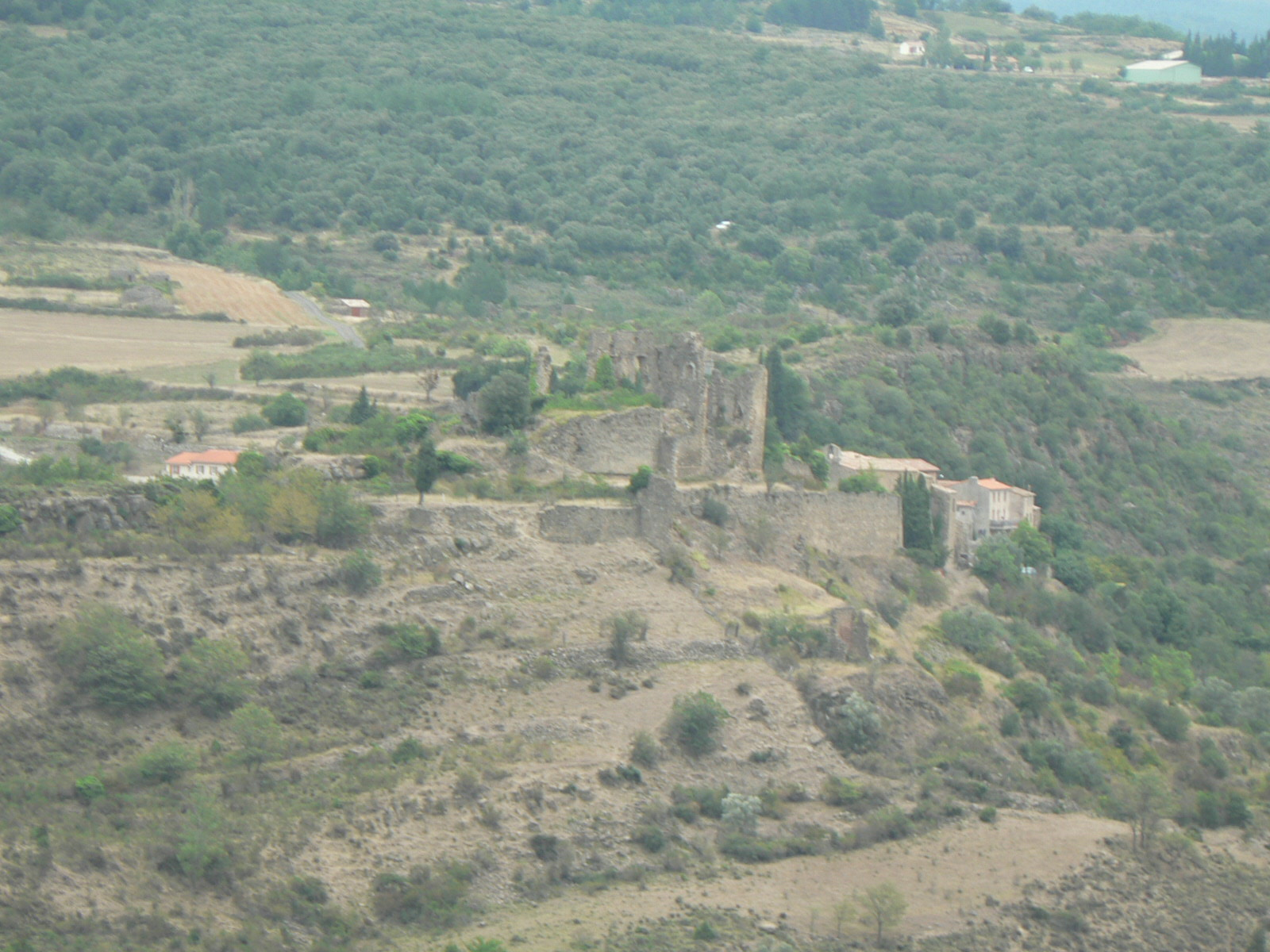
- The chateau ruins in Coustaussa

- Coat of arms
- Location of Coustaussa
- Location within France Location within Occitanie
- Coordinates: 42°56′30″N 2°16′44″E
- Country: France
- Region: Occitania
- Department: Aude
- Arrondissement: Limoux
- Canton: La Haute-Vallée de l'Aude
- Intercommunality: Limouxin

Government
  - Mayor (2020–2026): Didier Tricoire
- Area^{1}: 4.47 km^{2} (1.73 sq mi)
- Elevation: 318 m (1,043 ft)
- Highest elevation: 548 m (1,798 ft)
- Lowest elevation: 235 m (771 ft)
- Population (2023): 50
  - Density: 11/km^{2} (29/sq mi)
- Time zone: UTC+01:00 (CET)
  - Summer (DST): UTC+02:00 (CEST)
- INSEE/Postal code: 11109 /11190
- ^{1} French Land Register data, which excludes lakes, ponds, glaciers > 1 km^{2} (0.386 sq mi or 247 acres) and river estuaries.

Coustaussa (French pronunciation: [kustosa]; Occitan: Costauçan) is a commune in the Aude department in Occitanie region in southern France. Its inhabitants are called Coustaussans.

== Geography ==
The village is situated in the high valley of the Aude, on the river Sals between Arques and Couiza.

== History ==
In the twelfth century, the lordship of Coustaussa belonged to the Vilar family. In the fourteenth century, it was in the hands of the de Fenouillet family. In 1367, by the marriage of Geraude de Fenouillet to Saix de Montesquieu, the lordship passed to the Montesquieus who kept it until the French Revolution.

During the night of 31 October to 1 November 1897, the parish priest of Coustaussa, the Abbé Antoine Gélis, was brutally murdered in his presbytery. The crime was not solved. The Abbé was found during the investigation to possess large sums of money which had not been taken by his assailants.

== Administration ==
Since March 2001, the Mayor of the commune has been Robert Sanchez.

== Population ==
Historical population
Year	Pop.	±% p.a.
1968	69	—
1975	59	−2.21%
1982	52	−1.79%
1990	43	−2.35%
1999	49	+1.46%
2007	54	+1.22%
2012	51	−1.14%
2017	52	+0.39%
2023	50	−0.65%
Source: INSEE

== Places of interest ==
Coustaussa has a ruined castle.

== See also ==
- Communes of the Aude department
