= Montgey =

- Commune
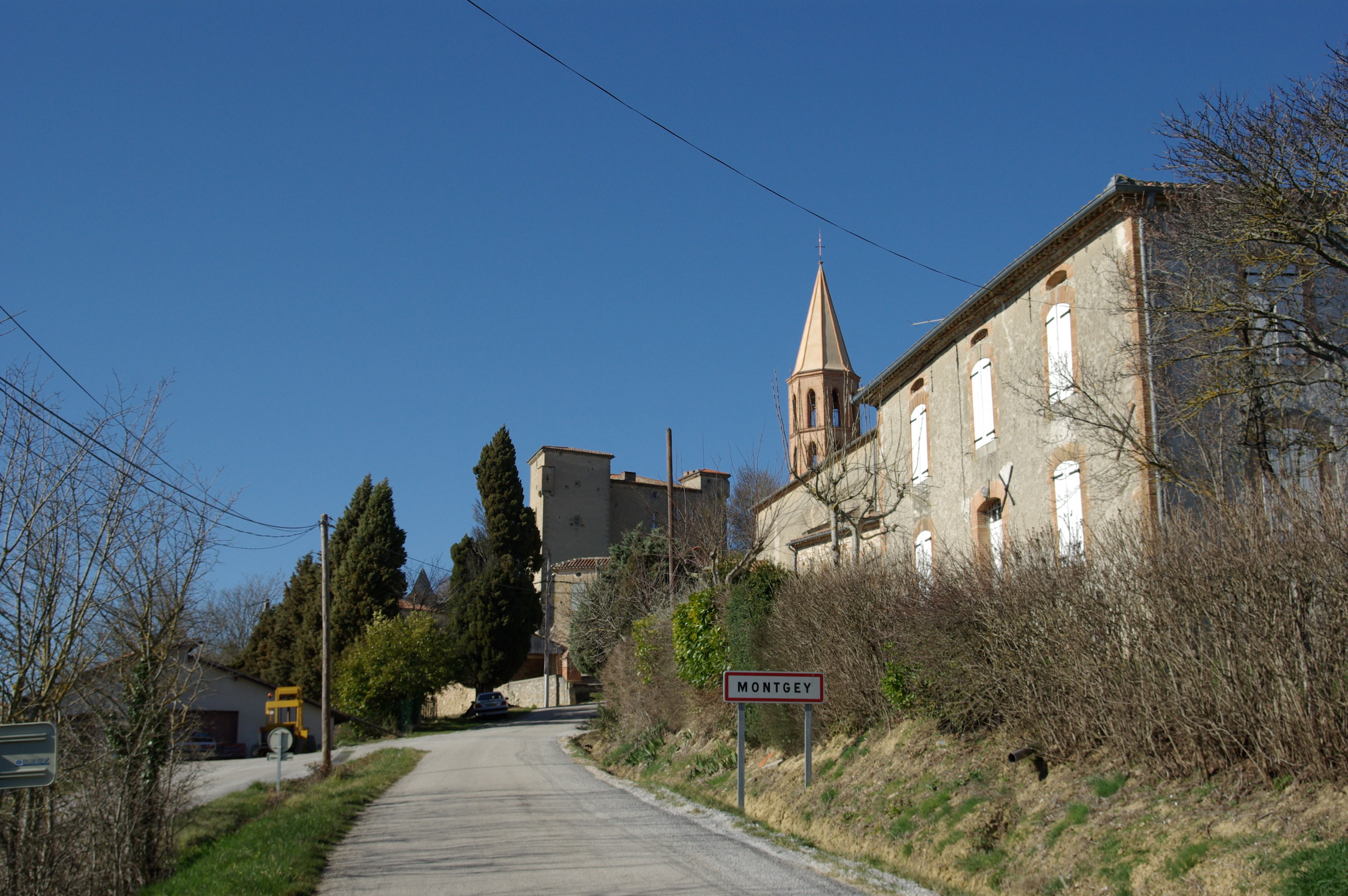
- The road into Montgey

- Coat of arms
- Location of Montgey
- Location within France Location within Occitanie
- Coordinates: 43°30′34″N 1°56′32″E
- Country: France
- Region: Occitania
- Department: Tarn
- Arrondissement: Castres
- Canton: Lavaur Cocagne
- Intercommunality: CC aux sources du Canal du Midi

Government
  - Mayor (2020–2026): Pierre Fraissé
- Area^{1}: 9.91 km^{2} (3.83 sq mi)
- Elevation: 217 m (712 ft)
- Highest elevation: 332 m (1,089 ft)
- Lowest elevation: 182 m (597 ft)
- Population (2023): 272
  - Density: 27.4/km^{2} (71.1/sq mi)
- Time zone: UTC+01:00 (CET)
  - Summer (DST): UTC+02:00 (CEST)
- INSEE/Postal code: 81179 /81470
- ^{1} French Land Register data, which excludes lakes, ponds, glaciers > 1 km^{2} (0.386 sq mi or 247 acres) and river estuaries.

Montgey (French pronunciation: [mɔ̃ʒɛ]; Occitan: Montjuèi) is a commune in the Tarn department in southern France.

== See also ==
- Communes of the Tarn department
