= Lombers =

- Commune
- Coat of arms
- Location of Lombers
- Location within France Location within Occitanie
- Coordinates: 43°48′18″N 2°09′03″E
- Country: France
- Region: Occitania
- Department: Tarn
- Arrondissement: Albi
- Canton: Le Haut Dadou
- Intercommunality: CC Centre Tarn

Government
  - Mayor (2020–2026): Claude Roques
- Area^{1}: 38.79 km^{2} (14.98 sq mi)
- Elevation: 1,911 m (6,270 ft)
- Highest elevation: 321 m (1,053 ft)
- Lowest elevation: 177 m (581 ft)
- Population (2023): 1,080
  - Density: 27.8/km^{2} (72.1/sq mi)
- Time zone: UTC+01:00 (CET)
  - Summer (DST): UTC+02:00 (CEST)
- INSEE/Postal code: 81147 /81120
- ^{1} French Land Register data, which excludes lakes, ponds, glaciers > 1 km^{2} (0.386 sq mi or 247 acres) and river estuaries.

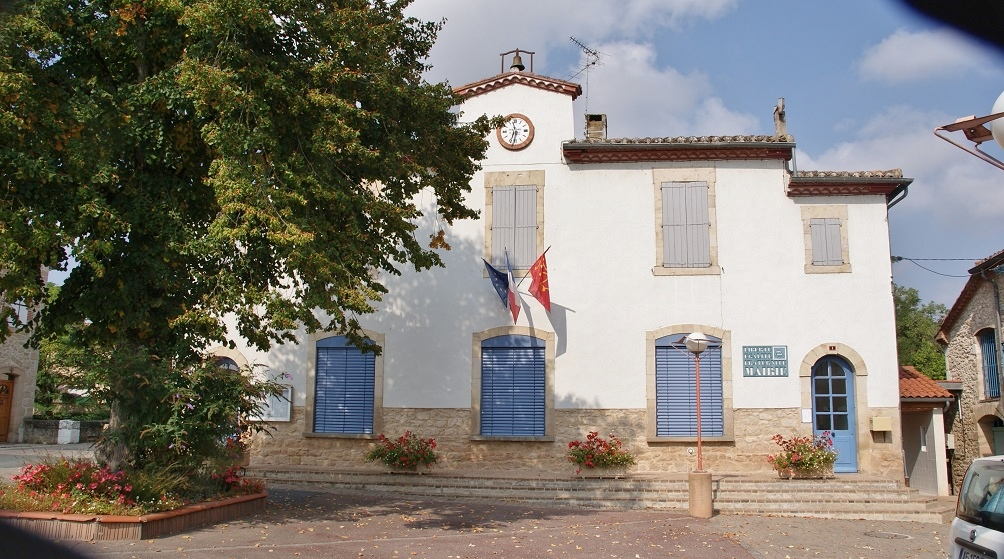
Lombers

Lombers is a commune in the Tarn department in southern France.

== History ==
Lombers was the significant centre of Catharism in the late 12th and early 13th centuries. It was the location of a Catholic-Cathar debate, perhaps in the 1180s, between Guillaume Peyre de Brens, Catholic bishop of Albi, and Sicard le Cellerier, Cathar bishop of Albi; Sicard lived at Lombers.

== Geography ==
The commune is traversed by the river Assou.

== See also ==
- Communes of the Tarn department
