= Pierre de Castelnau =

French ecclesiastic (died 1208)

Blessed Pierre de Castelnau
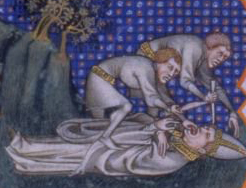
- Death of Pierre de Castelnau, from a 14th-century miniature

Personal details
- Born: Diocese of Montpellier, France
- Died: 15 January 1208 Saint-Gilles-du-Gard, France

Sainthood
- Beatified: 1208 by Pope Innocent III

Pierre de Castelnau (? - died 15 January 1208) was a French Catholic diplomat who was made papal legate in 1199 to address the Cathar heresy before being murdered in 1208. Following his death, Pope Innocent III beatified him, excommunicated Count Raymond VI of Toulouse and declared the Albigensian Crusade.

== Life ==
Pierre de Castelnau was born in the diocese of Montpellier. He became archdeacon of Maguelonne, and in 1199 was appointed by Pope Innocent III as one of the papal legates for the suppression of the Cathar heresy in Languedoc. In 1202, he made a profession as a Cistercian monk at the abbey of Fontfroide, Narbonne, and by 1203 was confirmed as papal legate and chief inquisitor, first in Languedoc, and afterwards at Viviers and Montpellier.

In 1207, Pierre was in the Rhone valley and in Provence, where he became involved in the strife between the count of Baux and Raymond VI, Count of Toulouse. Castelnau was assassinated on 15 January 1208, possibly by an agent of Raymond, but this was never proven. Nevertheless, Pope Innocent III held Raymond responsible: Pierre's murder was the immediate cause of Raymond's excommunication and the start of the Albigensian Crusade.

Pierre was beatified, through papal order, in 1208 by Pope Innocent III. The relics of Pierre de Castelnau are interred in the church of the ancient Abbey of St-Gilles.

== Sources ==
- Graham-Leigh, Elaine (2005). The Southern French Nobility and the Albigensian Crusade. The Boydell Press, Woodbridge. ISBN 1-84383-129-5.
- Madaule, Jacques (1967). The Albigensian Crusade: An Historical Essay. Fordham University Press.
- Oldenbourg, Zoe (2015). Massacre At Montsegur: A History Of The Albigensian Crusade. Hachette UK.
- Ryan, James D. (2004). "Missionary Saints of the High Middle Ages: Martyrdom, Popular Veneration, and Canonization". The Catholic Historical Review. 90, No. 1 (Jan.): 1–28. doi:10.1353/cat.2004.0041. S2CID 159687218.
- Sumption, Jonathan (1978). The Albigensian Crusade. Faber and Faber. ISBN 978-0571200023.
- Taylor, Claire (2011). Heresy, Crusade and Inquisition in Medieval Quercy. Boydell & Brewer Ltd. ISBN 9781903153383.
