= Pierre Roger de Cabaret =

French military leader

Pierre Roger de Cabaret (French) or Pèire Rogièr de Cabaret (Occitan) (fl. 13th century) was a military leader of the Occitan forces in the Albigensian Crusade.

He inherited three hilltop castles, including Cabaret, near modern-day Lastours from his father. He was a patron of the troubadours, including Peire Vidal.

He was a vassal of viscount Raymond Roger Trencavel, and was present with him during the siege of the castrum of Carcassonne in early stages of the Albigensian Crusade in 1209.

Allegedly, Pierre-Roger advised Trencavel to remain in the castrum rather than meet the crusader army in the open field, because he was outnumbered. After Raimond-Roger surrendered Carcassonne, Pierre-Roger managed to return to his own castles.

He successfully defended his castles against Simon de Montfort, 5th Earl of Leicester, but months later capitulated without military actions. He abandoned the Cabaret castles, but was granted lands near Beziérs in return.
