= William of Tudela =

13th century troubadour

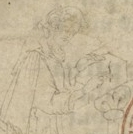

William of Tudela (in Occitan, Guilhem de Tudela; in French, Guillaume de Tudèle; fl. 1199–1214) was the author of the first part of the Canso de la Crozada or Song of the Albigensian Crusade, an epic poem in Old Occitan giving a contemporary account of the crusade against the Cathars.

== Biography ==
According to his own account in the first lines of his poem, William was born in Tudela in the Kingdom of Navarre (Spain). He refers to himself as maestre and clerc, indicating that his studies entitled him to the title of Master and that he had taken minor orders. He specifically states that he studied geomancy.

In or around 1199, William of Tudela went to Montauban (France) and lived there for 11 years. He claims that his knowledge of the future through geomancy impelled him to move in 1210 to Bruniquel, which had then just been bestowed on Baldwin, estranged brother of Count Raymond VI of Toulouse. The result of this move (and possibly one of its aims) was that William entered Baldwin's service. He became canon at Saint-Antonin (which, in the course of the Albigensian Crusade, Simon de Montfort, 5th Earl of Leicester had just captured and given to Baldwin). More importantly, William now began to compose the Chanson de la Croisade Albigeoise. Work on the first part of this poem began in 1210, William implies, though in the form now known it seems to have been written in its entirety in 1213.

Our knowledge of William's life ends in 1213 or 1214. One date is that of the capture (on 17 February 1214) and subsequent execution of Baldwin by his brother Raymond. William's poem speaks of Baldwin as still alive. Moreover, William's poem ends before the Battle of Muret on 12 September 1213: Baldwin's participation on the winning side in that battle, in which Raymond lost Toulouse and Raymond's feudal overlord Peter II of Aragon was killed, was the excuse for his execution as a traitor. If William survived these events, he was at any rate impelled by them to stop writing. The second part of the Chanson is written by another unknown poet.
