= Laurence Marvin =

American historian

Laurence W. Marvin is assistant professor of history in the Evans School of Humanities and Social Sciences at Berry College whose primary scholarly focus is the Albigensian Crusade.

== Published books ==
- Marvin, Laurence W. (2008). The Occitan War: A Military and Political History of the Albigensian Crusade, 1209-1218. Cambridge University Press. ISBN 978-0-521-87240-9.
- Marvin, Laurence W. (2024). The Damietta Crusade, 1217-1221: A Military History. Oxford University Press. ISBN 0198916191.
