= Peter of Vaux-de-Cernay =

Peter of Vaux de Cernay (died c.1218) was a Cistercian monk of Vaux-de-Cernay Abbey, in what is now Yvelines, northern France, and a chronicler of the Albigensian Crusade. His Historia Albigensis is one of the primary sources for the events of that crusade.

The chronicle is thought to have been written from 1212 to 1218, recounting events which were principally those of 1203 to 1208, but also later events, at some of which Peter himself was present as eyewitness. His uncle Guy of Vaux-de-Cernay was his abbot, bishop of Carcassonne for some years from 1212, and a preacher brought in earlier to preach against Catharism by Simon de Montfort, 5th Earl of Leicester.

Peter had also followed the early Fourth Crusade, with Guy, as far as Zara, Dalmatia. They joined Simon perhaps in 1210, and Peter likely knew Simon personally.

His writing is generally considered partisan, taking the Catholic side, but also to be more objective in reporting Cathar beliefs and actions than some of the hunters of heresy. Steven Runciman gives examples in which Peter's discussion of Cathar theology is presumably accurate, or, exaggerated for propaganda effect. The chronicle was not written after 1218, and it is suggested that Peter's death shortly after that year may be the reason.
