= Cardinal Bonzi =

Cardinal Bonzi or Cardinal Bonsi may refer to:

- Jean de Bonsi (1554–1621), created cardinal in 1611
- Piero de Bonzi (1631–1703), created cardinal in 1672
