= Michel Roquebert =

French writer and historian (1928–2020)

- Born: 7 August 1928; Bordeaux, France
- Died: 15 June 2020 (aged 91); Toulouse, France
- Occupation: Writer

Michel Roquebert (7 August 1928 – 15 June 2020) was a French writer and historian.

== Biography ==
After studying classical studies at the Lycée Montaigne in Bordeaux, Roquebert earned a license in philosophy. In 1955, he began working for La Dépêche du Midi in Toulouse. He wrote numerous articles on the arts, for which he dedicated a weekly chronicle.

In 1970, Roquebert wrote the first volume of L'Épopée cathare, which won the Grand Prix Robert of the Académie Française. The second volume was written in 1977 and was followed by three more. In 1983, Roquebert retired from journalism and devoted himself to history. He moved to Montségur, where he headed an archaeological research group. In this group, he helped resurface the south facade of the village's castle, restoring it to its original elevation. Additionally, he dedicated the fourth volume of L'Épopée cathare to Montségur. The fifth and final volume of L'Épopée cathare was written in 1998, totalling more than 3000 pages over the five editions.

Roquebert was elected into the Société archéologique du Midi de la France in 1971. In 2001, he became a corresponding member of the Académie des sciences, inscriptions et belles-lettres de Toulouse. He joined the Consistori del Gay Saber on 16 January 2011. He was a member of the Centre d'études cathares de Carcassonne from 1985 to 2011. He was honorary president of the Association d'études du catharisme from its founding in 2011.

Michel Roquebert died on 15 June 2020 in Toulouse at the age of 91.

== Awards ==
- Knight of the Ordre national du Mérite
- Knight of the Ordre des Arts et des Lettres

== Publications ==
=== Books ===
- Citadelles du vertige (1966)
- L’Invasion (L’Épopée cathare. Tome 1, 1198-1212) (1970)
- Muret ou la dépossession (L’Épopée cathare. Tome 2, 1213-1216) (1977)
- Montségur : les cendres de la liberté (1981)
- Le lys et la croix (L’Épopée cathare. Tome 3, 1216-1229) (1986)
- Récits et légendes de l’Antiquité toulousaine (1986)
- Rues tolosanes' (1988)
- Mourir à Montségur (L’Épopée cathare. Tome 4, 1230-1244) (1989)
- Ombre et lumière en pays cathare (1992)
- Les cathares et le Graal (1994)
- Les Cathares, de la chute de Montségur aux derniers bûchers (L’Épopée cathare. Tome 5, 1245-1321) (1998)
- Erpeldinger : œuvres sur papier : 1987-1998 (1998)
- Histoire des Cathares (1999)
- La religion cathare : le bien, le mal et le salut dans l’hérésie médiévale (2001)
- Cathares : la terre et les hommes (2001)
- Saint Dominique : la légende noire (2003)
- Simon de Montfort : bourreau et martyr (2005)
- Figures du catharisme (2018)

=== Collaborative works ===
- La peinture à Toulouse en 1964 (with Robert Aribaud and Henry Lhong)
- Albigeois et Cathares (with Jacques Madaule and Renat Nelli, 1976)
- Les Cathares en Occitanie (with Robèrt Lafont, Jean Duvernoy, Philippe Martel, and Rémy Pech, 1982)
- L'aventure cathare (with Anne Brenon and Chema Sarmiento, 2001)

=== Juvenile ===
- Aymeric et les Cathares (1978)
- Aymeric à Montségur (1981)

=== Principal Articles ===
- "La crise albigeoise et la fin de l’autonomie occitane. État de la question et bibliographie critique" (1972)
- "Les seigneurs de Montgey au xiiie siècle. Jourdain de Roquefort et sa famille" (1977)
- "Les Lahille de Laurac (Aude)" (1978)
- "Le problème du Moyen Age et la Croisade albigeoise : les bases juridiques de l’État occitano-catalan de 1213" (1978)
- "Les cathares à Puylaurens au xiiie siècle" (1979)
- "Pierre-Roger de Mirepoix, coseigneur de Montségur, et sa famille" (1980)
- "Raymond de Péreille, seigneur de Montségur, et sa famille" (1981)
- "Imbert de Salles, sergent de Montségur" (1982)
- "Le catharisme comme tradition dans la familia languedocienne" (1985)
- "Montségur : le castrum de 1204-1244. L’apport des sources écrites" (1992)
- "Bérenger de Lavelanet et sa famille" (1992)
- "Le trésor de Montségur" (1994)
- "Napoléon Peyrat, le trésor et le Nouveau Montségur" (1994)
- "Un exemple de catharisme ordinaire : Fanjeaux" (1995)
- "La famille seigneuriale du Mas-Saintes-Puelles devant l’Inquisition" (1995)
- "Petites digressions sur le Marteau des hérétiques [L’inquisiteur Bernard de Caux]" (1996)
- "Le Graal contre les cathares" (1996)
- "Montségur, refuge ou quartier général ?" (1996)
- "Pèlerinage et hérésie" (1999)
- "Le déconstructionnisme et les études cathares" (2005)
- "L'émigration languedocienne en Italie padane au cours du xiiie siècle" (2005)
- "Béziers, 22 juillet 1209 : autopsie d’un massacre annoncé" (2006)
- "Gesu, la Gnosi e le origine del totalitarismo" (2009)
- "Les fondements juridiques de l’intervention du roi Pierre II d’Aragon sur le théâtre de la croisade albigeoise" (2013)
