= Jean Bouillet =

French physician

Jean Bouillet (6 March 1690, Servian near Béziers – 13 August 1777, Béziers) was an 18th-century French physician. The physician and encyclopédiste Jean-Henri-Nicolas Bouillet was his son.
