= Massacre at Béziers =

1209 killing of Cathars during the Albigensian Crusade

- Part of the Albigensian Crusade
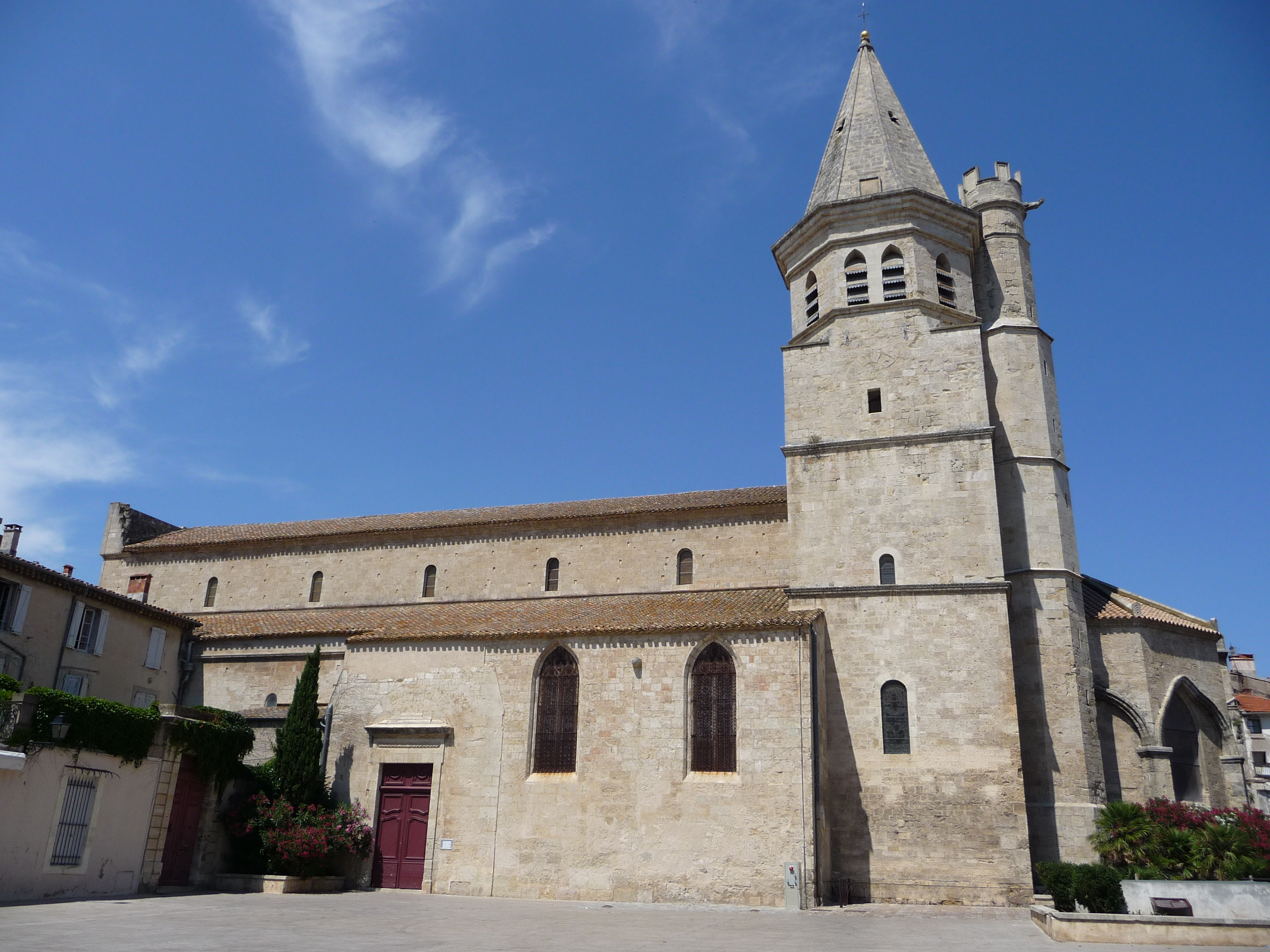
- The church of Saint Mary Magdalene where 7,000 people were massacred according to Peter of Vaux-de-Cernay
- Location: 43.3476°N 3.2190°E; Béziers, County of Toulouse (now in Hérault, Occitanie, France)
- Date: 22 July 1209
- Target: People of Béziers, especially Cathars
- Attack type: Mass murder
- Deaths: 20,000
- Perpetrator: Crusaders
- Motive: Anti-Catharism

The Massacre at Béziers occurred on 22 July 1209 during the sack of Béziers by Crusaders. It was the outcome of the Siege of Béziers, which was the first major military action of the Albigensian Crusade.

== Background ==
The Albigensian Crusade was initiated in the Kingdom of France at the behest of Pope Innocent III. Its purpose was to squash the growing Cathar movement, a religious sect challenging the teachings of the Catholic Church. The movement flourished mainly in the Languedoc region of what later became Southern France.

At the time, the Kingdom of France controlled only part of what is now Northern France, whereas the Languedoc was divided between multiple different polities. The two regions had distinct customs and languages. The immediate cause of the crusade was the killing of the papal legate, Pierre de Castelnau. The retinue of professional soldiers, mercenary bands (routiers), and pilgrims, assembled and departed from Lyon in early July 1209, beginning the Albigensian Crusade.

Raymond VI, Count of Toulouse, had difficult relations with Innocent and was accused of sheltering heretics. He was able to switch sides in time and joined the Crusaders at Valence. By 20 July, the Crusaders had gathered at the strongly Catholic town of Montpellier, which was a vassal to the Kingdom of Aragon. As Raymond had been reconciled with the Church, his lands could not be targeted. Instead, the Crusaders took aim for the territory of Raymond Roger Trencavel, viscount of Béziers and Carcassonne and nephew and vassal to Raymond VI.

Raymond Roger was not officially a Cathar, but he tolerated the existence of the Cathar sect within his territory. He attempted to negotiate with the Crusader army at Montpellier, absolving himself of the things that happened in his domain because of his youth—he was 24 at the time—and declaring his loyalty to the Church. His attempt to prevent the Crusaders' attack on his lands was rejected. The viscount departed from Montpellier in a hurry, ahead of the Crusader army, to prepare his defenses. On the way to Carcassonne, Raymond Roger stopped at Béziers.

The town of Béziers had a strong community of Cathars. According to the chronicler Peter of Vaux-de-Cernay, the city was "entirely infected with the poison of heresy" and its people were "brimful of every kind of sin". Had Raymond Roger chosen to defend the city when it was besieged, he might have been separated from the remainder of his domains. The viscount abandoned Béziers, and, after promising reinforcements, hurried to his capital of Carcassonne to prepare its defenses. He took with him some Cathars as well as the Jewish population of Béziers.

There are two main chronicles which act as sources for these events: the one written by Peter of Vaux-de-Cernay and another by William of Tudela. These interpret Raymond Roger's decision to flee differently. Peter writes that he abandoned Béziers out of fear of the Crusader army. William says that it was because he felt his presence was needed in Carcassonne and that the people of Béziers could adequately resist the Crusaders without him. Historian Laurence Marvin feels that because of Raymond Roger's subsequent stout defense of Carcassonne, William's explanation is more likely.

The military garrison and civilian population of Béziers hurriedly constructed some defenses. They deepened the wells around the city but felt confident in the strength of its walls and in their own supplies. They also hoped that the supposed vastness of the Crusader army would rapidly lead to supply shortages.

== The sack of Béziers ==
Commanded by the papal legate, the Abbot of Citeaux, Arnaud Amalric, the Crusader army reached the outskirts of Béziers on 21 July. They set up camp along the Orb River. By that time, only a small number of residents of the town had chosen to leave. Shortly after, the Bishop of Béziers, Renaud de Montpeyroux, tried to avert bloodshed and to negotiate. He came back to Béziers with the message that the town would be spared provided it would hand over their heretics.

Montpeyroux drew up a list of 222 individuals, mostly Cathars, some Waldensians, likely to be perfecti or leaders of their communities. The list has survived. But in a meeting at the cathedral, it was determined that to hand over these people was not possible because they had too much support within the town. Montpeyroux therefore asked the Catholics to leave the town to save themselves. This proposal was overwhelmingly rejected, and Montpeyroux left the town with just a few Catholics. Most of the Catholic population, including multiple priests, elected not to leave the city.

On 22 July, the Crusaders were busy getting settled and still days away from starting the siege proper. It was to the Crusaders' advantage to take the city quickly. Delay would give Raymond Roger time to organize his defenses and increase the likelihood that the army would run out of supplies or drift apart. The day began quietly on both sides. That morning, a group of either soldiers or perhaps merely armed civilians from the town made a sortie exiting the gate overlooking the river Orb. According to William of Tudela, their intention was to humiliate the Crusaders. He writes:

Ah, it was an ill service that man did the townsfolk who counseled them to go forth from the city in broad daylight! For mark well what these wretched creatures did, in their vast ignorance and folly: out they went, waving their coarse, white linen banners, shouting at the tops of their voices, and thinking to scare the enemy thus, as one might scare birds on a wheatfield—bawling and hallooing, and waving their flags, and all this at crack of dawn, as soon as it was light.

As the detachment from Béziers shouted insults at the Crusaders, a man from the Crusading army approached them intending to respond to the insults. He was killed. In response, hired mercenaries from the Crusader army known as routiers attacked the defenders. A brawl ensued and soon the attackers from the town found themselves outnumbered and retreated in disarray.

According to historian Zoe Oldenbourg, some of the routiers were likely able to enter the town through the open gate before it could be closed, and then fought with the guards stationed at the wall for control of the gate. Seeing the brawl, the Crusader leaders decided to send the entire army forward. The garrison resisted attack before being overwhelmed by the larger Crusader army, while other Crusaders had already managed to move beyond the garrison and into the town.

The routiers rampaged through the streets. They invaded private homes, killing and plundering. Clergy vested and rang church bells, but were unable to prevent the soldiers from rampaging. Those citizens who could run sought refuge in the churches – Béziers Cathedral and the churches of St Mary Magdalene and of St Jude. Yet the churches did not provide safety against the invaders. The doors of the churches were broken open, and all inside, regardless of age and sex, and including priests, were slaughtered.

Although the knights did not stop the massacre, they soon intervened to claim the valuables of the city for themselves. In retaliation, the angry and disappointed routiers burned down buildings, destroying most of the plunder, and the Crusaders were quickly forced to leave the ruined town.

=== "Kill them all; God will know His own" ===
Amalric's own version of the siege, described in his letter to Pope Innocent in August 1209 (col. 139), states:

Indeed, because there is no strength nor is there cunning against God, while discussions were still going on with the barons about the release of those in the city who were deemed to be Catholics, the servants and other persons of low rank and unarmed attacked the city without waiting for orders from their leaders. To our amazement, crying "to arms, to arms!", within the space of two or three hours they crossed the ditches and the walls and Béziers was taken. Our men spared no one, irrespective of rank, sex or age, and put to the sword almost 20,000 people. After this great slaughter the whole city was despoiled and burnt, as divine vengeance miraculously raged against it.

In his manuscript The Dialogue on Miracles, which was written between 1219 and 1223, Caesarius of Heisterbach relates this story about the massacre:

When they discovered, from the admissions of some of them, that there were Catholics mingled with the heretics they said to the abbot "Sir, what shall we do, for we cannot distinguish between the faithful and the heretics." The abbot, like the others, was afraid that many, in fear of death, would pretend to be Catholics, and after their departure, would return to their heresy, and is said to have replied "Caedite eos. Novit enim Dominus qui sunt eius – Kill them all for 'the Lord knoweth them that are His' (2 Tim. ii. 19)" and so countless number in that town were slain.

While there remains doubt that the abbot said these words – also paraphrased as "Kill them all; God will know His own", "Kill them all; God will sort his own", or "Kill them all and let God sort them out" – there is little if any doubt that these words captured the spirit of the assault, and that the Crusaders intended to slaughter the inhabitants. The Crusaders allowed the routiers to rampage and kill without restraint, sparing neither women nor children, but swiftly put a stop to looting.

Christopher Tyerman says that "[t]he true figure was almost certainly far less." Marvin calls Amalric's exhortation "apocryphal", adding that the "speed and spontaneity of the attack indicates that the legate may not have actually known what was going on until it was over". He writes that "clearly most of Beziers' population and buildings survived" and that the city "continued to function as a major population center".

== Aftermath ==
The Crusaders had achieved a quick and devastating victory. Many castles and towns submitted without further resistance. Carcassonne fell within a month and Raymond-Roger Trencavel died in captivity later that year, his lands being given to de Montfort. However, the Crusaders lost the support of much of the local Catholic population and became a hated occupying force. According to Tyerman: "Thereafter, adherence or opposition to the Crusaders was determined largely by secular considerations". The war became protracted, and eventually the French king entered the conflict and took control over the Languedoc, leading to the gradual extermination of the Cathar movement.

During the fire, the Cathedral of Saint Nazaire burned and collapsed. A plaque opposite the cathedral records the "Day of Butchery" perpetrated by the "northern barons". A few parts of the Romanesque cathedral survived, and repairs started in 1215. The restoration, along with that of the rest of the city, continued until the 15th century.

== Bibliography ==
- Archives départementales de l'Hérault, 1209 : le sac de Béziers vu par ses contemporains, dossier préparé par Damien Vaisse, Montpellier, Conseil général de l'Hérault, 2009, 12 p., ill. (édition des témoignages du XIIIe siècle sur le sac de Béziers)
- Brenon, Anne. Les femmes cathares, Perrin, 1992.
- Brenon, Anne. Petit Précis de Catharisme, Loubatières, 1996.
- Brenon, Anne. Les cathares : Pauvres du Christ ou apôtres de Satan ?, collection « Découvertes Gallimard » (nº 319), série Religions. Paris: Gallimard, 1997.
- Brenon, Anne (2000). Les Archipels Cathares. OCLC 44926327.
- Brenon, Anne, "Hérésie, courtoisie et poésie. A la recherche de traces de catharisme dans la littérature occitane du Moyen Âge.", in AA.VV. Trobadours et Cathares en Occitanie médiévale; atti del Convegno di Chancelade, 24 e 25 agosto 2002, pp. 61–79.
- Dante, Domenico. Il tempo interrotto. Breve storia dei catari in Occidente, Palomar, Bari 2009.
- Duvernoy, Jean. Le Catharisme. La religion, 1976.
- Duvernoy, Jean. Le Catharisme. L'histoire, 1979.
- Duvernoy, Jean. Cathares, Vaudois et Béguins. Dissidents du pays d'Oc, Editions Privat, 1994.
- Falk, Avner (2010). Franks and Saracens: Reality and Fantasy in the Crusades. London: Karnac Books, Ltd. ISBN 978-1-85575-733-2.
- Marvin, Laurence W. (2008). The Occitan War: A Military and Political History of the Albigensian Crusade, 1209–1218. Cambridge: Cambridge University Press. ISBN 978-0521123655.
- O'Shea, Stephen. The Perfect Heresy: The Life and Death of the Cathars, Profile Books Ltd, 2001. ISBN 978-1861973504
- Oldenbourg, Zoé (1961) [1959]. Massacre at Montségur: A History of the Albigensian Crusade. Translated by Green, Peter. London: Weidenfeld and Nicolson. OCLC 655562901.
- Peter of les Vaux de Cernay (1998) [1212–1218]. Sibly, W.A.; Sibly, M.D. (eds.). The History of the Albigensian Crusade: Peter of les Vaux-de-Cernay's Historia Albigensis. Suffolk, UK: Boydell & Brewer. ISBN 0-85115-807-2.
- Strayer, Joseph R. (1992) [1971]. The Albigensian Crusades. New York: The Dial Press. ISBN 0-472-09476-9.
- Tyerman, Christopher (2006). God's War: A New History of the Crusades. Cambridge, MA: Harvard University Press. ISBN 978-0674023871.
