= Tuchin revolt =

1378–1384 French tax revolt

The Tuchin revolt (in French, the tuchinat) was a tax revolt of "workers and artisans" in Southern France between 1378 and 1384.

== History ==
In 1378, the town council of Le Puy imposed an indirect tax on consumption at a flat rate in order to subsidise the war with England. According to a letter written after the revolt, when the tax was announced the people cried, "O blessed Virgin Mary help us! How shall we live, how shall we be able to feed our children, since we cannot support the heavy taxes established to our own prejudice through the influence of the rich to reduce their own taxes?"

During the Montpelier riot of 1380, according to one account, rioters "quarters the bodies of King's officers with knives and ate the baptized flesh ... or threw it to the beasts".

The revolt spread west as people objected to heavy taxes to pay for the king's war. In September 1381, in response to unfair assessments for direct taxes, the workers of Béziers rebelled. A crowd stormed the Hôtel de Ville (town hall) and set the tower on fire, burning several councillors alive and forcing others to jump to their deaths. The Duke of Berry intervened quickly at Béziers, ordering forty-one rebels executed by hanging and four more beheaded in the town square as an example.

The Tuchins were eventually suppressed by the Duke of Berry in 1384.
