= Jean-Henri-Nicolas Bouillet =

French physician, Encyclopédiste and mayor of Béziers (1729–1790)

- Born: December 1729; Béziers, France
- Died: 22 January 1790 (aged 60); Béziers, France
- Occupations: Physician, Encyclopédiste
- Title: Mayor of Béziers
- Term: 1787 – 1790
- Parents: Jean Bouillet (father); Catherine Marsals (mother)

Jean-Henri-Nicolas Bouillet (December 1729, Béziers – 22 January 1790, Béziers) was an 18th-century French physician, Encyclopédiste and mayor of Béziers from 1787 to 1790.

Bouillet was the first son of a doctor from Béziers, Jean Bouillet (1690–1777) and his wife Catherine Marsals (born 1700). Jean-Henri-Nicolas had a younger brother, Michel Jean Louis Bouillet (born 1732) and two older sisters, Catherine Jacquette (born 1723) and Gabrielle Bouillet (circa 1727-1789). He was a member of the Académie de Béziers.

== Works (selection) ==
- Mémoire sur les pleuro-péripneumonies épidémiques de Béziers, lu à la séance publique de l’Académie des sciences et belles-lettres de Bésiers le 26 octobre 1758, Béziers, 1759, in-4°;
- (in collaboration with his father) Observations sur l'anasarque, les hydropisies de poitrine, du péricarde, etc., avec des réflexions sur ces maladies, p. PP5, at Google Books, Béziers, François Barbut, 1765, 154 p.
- Mémoire sur l’hydropisie de poitrine et sur les hydropisies du péricarde, du médiastin et de la plèvre, Béziers, 1788, in-4°.
- Solution d’un problème, Toulouse, in-4°.

He contributed the article Faculté to the 6th volume of the Encyclopédie by Diderot, 1751, vol.6, (p. 361–371);

Maxime Laignel-Lavastine called him an "epidemiologist and pioneer of social medicine".

== Bibliography ==
- Louis-Gabriel Michaud: Biographie universelle ancienne et moderne: histoire par ordre alphabétique de la vie publique et privée de tous les hommes avec la collaboration de plus de 300 savants et littérateurs français ou étrangers. 2. Ausgabe, (1843–1865)
- Jacques Proust: L'encyclopédisme dans le Bas-Languedoc au XVIII^{e} siècle. Montpellier 1968
