= Jean Magrou =

French sculptor

Jean Marie Joseph Magrou (October 22, 1869 – 1945) was a French sculptor, born in Béziers, France. He studied under Eugène Émile Thomas and Injalbert.

Magrou was a Chevalier of the Legion of Honour.

He is remembered, among things for his statues of Pedro II of Brazil, in Brazil.
