= Béziers Cathedral =

Roman Catholic church in Béziers, France

Coordinates: 43°20′29″N 3°12′36″E

Béziers Cathedral Cathédrale Saint-Nazaire-et-Saint-Celse de Béziers
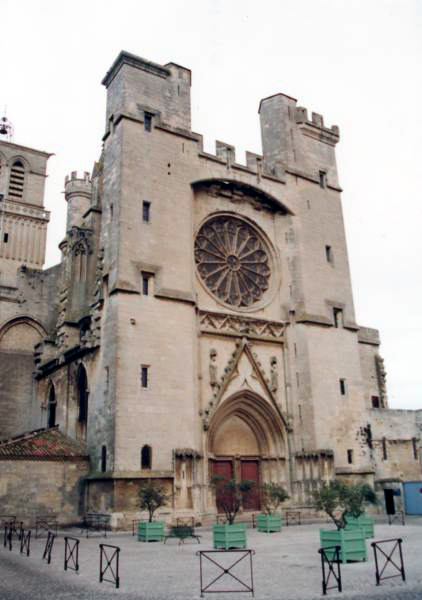
- Béziers Cathedral

Religion
- Affiliation: Roman Catholic Church
- Province: Bishopric of Béziers
- Region: Hérault
- Rite: Roman
- Ecclesiastical or organisational status: Cathedral
- Status: Active

Location
- Location: Béziers, France
- Interactive map of Béziers Cathedral; Cathédrale Saint-Nazaire-et-Saint-Celse de Béziers

Architecture
- Type: Church
- Style: Romanesque

Béziers Cathedral (French: Cathédrale Saint-Nazaire-et-Saint-Celse de Béziers) is a Roman Catholic church located in Béziers, France.

The edifice dates from the thirteenth century, having been erected on the site of an earlier building that was destroyed during the Massacre at Béziers in the Albigensian Crusade. The cathedral was formerly the seat of the Bishopric of Béziers, which was dissolved by the Concordat of 1801 and annexed into the Diocese of Montpellier.

== History ==
The origins of the cathedral date to the 8th century, when a Romanesque cathedral was constructed on the site of an ancient Roman temple dedicated to Augustus and Livia. Destroyed by fire during the Massacre at Béziers in July 1209, reconstruction of the cathedral began in 1215 and was rededicated to Saint Nazarius. The rebuilding campaign introduced the Gothic architectural style while retaining portions of the earlier structure, including its fortress-like appearance. Construction continued with successive additions including the nave, large stained glass panels, chapels, and sculptural decoration continuing into the 14th century.
