= Bonsi della Ruota =

Florentine noble family, prominent in France

The Bonsi della Ruota, usually known simply as the Buonsi, Bonsi or Bonzi, were a noble family from the late medieval Republic of Florence that rose to prominence in early modern France.

In Florence, the Bonsi supplied three gonfalonieri and 26 priori.

Medallion of Francesco, son of the ambassador to Charles VIII (1484)

The first Bonsi in France was Domenico Bonsi, son of Baldassare, who served as a Florentine envoy to King Charles VIII in 1494. Antonio served as bishop of Terracina and negotiated the marriage of Catherine de' Medici to King Henry II. Roberto was the Florentine ambassador to Pope Clement VII. His daughter Lucrezia married Giuliano de' Medici, while his son, Domenico, was ambassador to Pope Pius V and also spent time in France. There was a Francesco Bonsi who died at the siege of Amiens (1597).

Thomas I de Bonsi served as bishop of Béziers from 1576 to 1596. Thereafter, the bishopric was held by members of the family continuously down to 1669. Thomas resigned the see in 1596 and King Henry IV appointed Jean de Bonsi, son of Domenico, to succeed him. His coadjutor was another Domenico. He later made him grand almoner. In 1621, he was succeeded as bishop by Thomas II, who was succeeded in 1628 by Clément. On the latter's death in 1659, the bishopric passed to Pierre, who acted as a royal ambassador on many occasions and was named grand almoner (1671). Pierre's father, Francesco Bonsi, had been the French resident at the Duchy of Mantua.

Other prominent members include:

- Lelio Bonsi (born 1532)
- Isabeau de Bonzi (1628–1708)
- Francesco Bonsi (1722–1803)
