= Hôtel de Ville, Béziers =

Town hall in Béziers, France

Hôtel de Ville
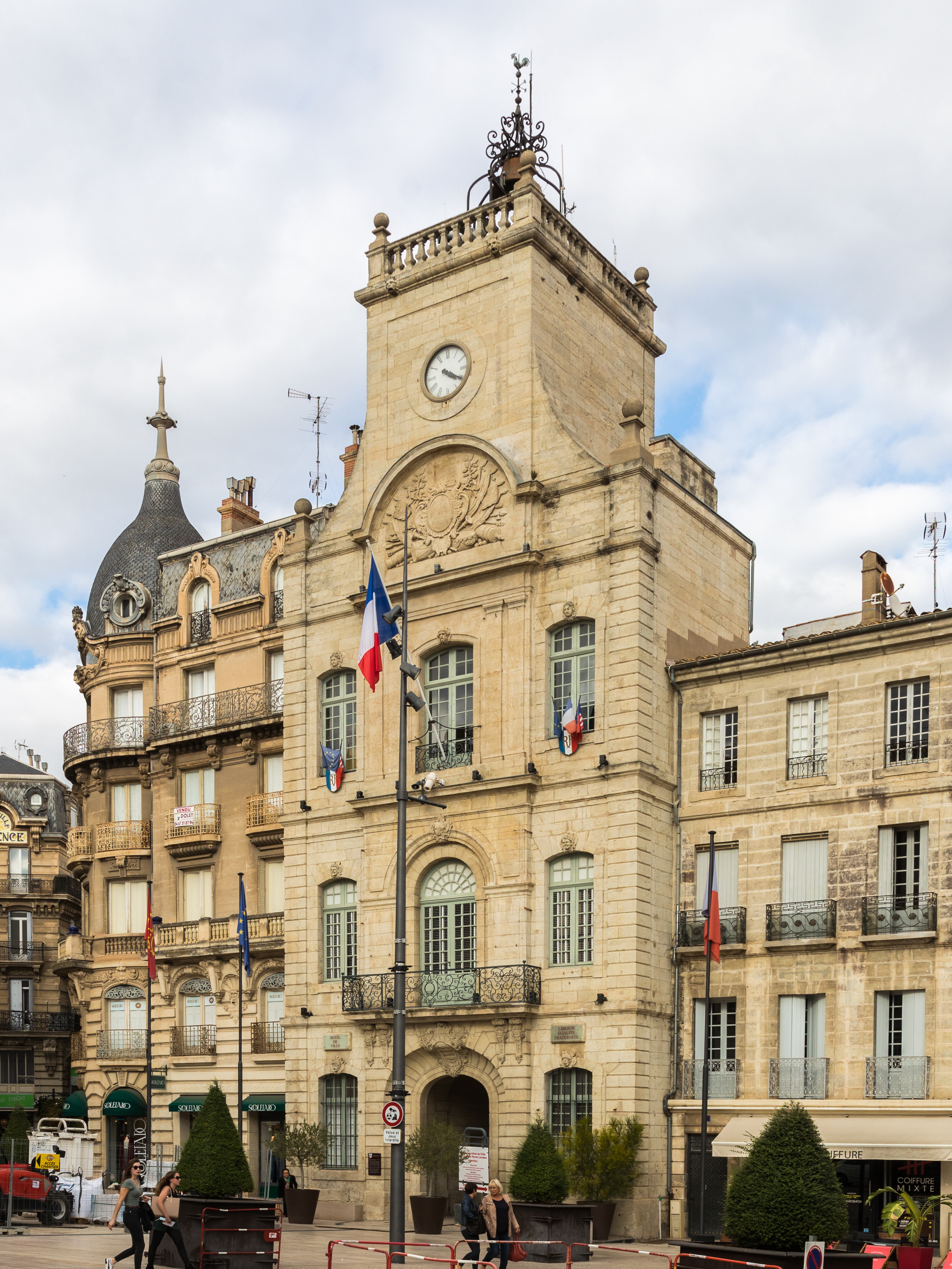
- The main frontage of the Hôtel de Ville in October 2021

General information
- Type: City hall
- Architectural style: Neoclassical style
- Location: Béziers, France
- Coordinates: 43.3428°N 3.2133°E
- Completed: 1746

Design and construction
- Architect: Sieur Cadas

Monument historique
- Official name: Hôtel de ville
- Type: Inscrit
- Designated: 1935
- Reference no.: PA00103383

The Hôtel de Ville (French pronunciation: [otɛl də vil], City Hall) is a municipal building in Béziers, Hérault, southern France, standing on Place Gabriel Péri. The building was designated a monument historique by the French government in 1935.

== History ==
The first town hall in Béziers was a residential building, built on the site of an old Roman forum and owned by the Ermengaud family, which was acquired by the consuls in 1238. During the Tuchin revolt, workers and artisans in southern France rebelled against taxes imposed by the government to finance the Hundred Years' War. In September 1381, a group of protestors attacked the town hall and set it on fire, burning several councillors alive, and forcing others to jump to their deaths. Four of the rebels were beheaded and 41 were hanged on the orders of the Regent of France, John, Duke of Berry.

By 1730, the old town hall was dilapidated and council leaders decided to demolish it and to build a new town hall on the same site. The old building was demolished in 1740 and construction on the new building started in 1742. It was designed by the architect of the city of Narbonne, Sieur Cadas, in the neoclassical style, built in ashlar stone and was officially opened by the mayor, Étienne Guibel, on 15 August 1746.

The design involved a symmetrical main frontage of three bays facing onto the Place de la Fontaine (now Place Gabriel Péri). The central bay featured a round headed doorway with an archivolt and a keystone on the ground floor, flanked by brackets supporting a balcony with iron railings. There was a round headed French door with an archivolt and keystone on the first floor, and a segmental headed window with a moulded surround and a keystone on the second floor. The central bay was surmounted by a two-stage tower: the tower contained a heraldic shield under an arch in the first stage, and a clock in the second stage, with a balustraded parapet and corner finials above. The outer bays were fenestrated with segmental headed windows on all three floors. Internally, the principal rooms were a courtroom on the ground floor and a large ballroom, which also served as the Salle du Conseil (council chamber), on the first floor.

In 1790, during the Reign of Terror, part of the French Revolution, rioters attacked the salt guards, who were responsible for apprehending salt smugglers, followed them into the tower of the town hall, where they had taken refuge, and murdered them. The Bishop of Béziers, Aymar Claude de Nicolaï, appeared on the balcony of the town hall, deplored the loss of life and appealed for calm.

The doorway was restored and enhanced, early in the second half of the 19th century, during the reign of Napoleon III.

Then in May 1907, during the Revolt of the Languedoc winegrowers, demonstrators set fire to the façade of the town hall and the police station: the Minister of the Interior, Georges Clemenceau, sent in troops from the 17th Infantry Regiment to restore order but 500 members of the regiment, who were sympathetic to the demands of the wine growers, mutinied. Following the First World War, the artist, Raoul Guiraud, painted a series of frescoes for the council chamber.

After the Second World War, the square in front of the town hall was renamed Place Gabriel Péri to commemorate the life of the politician, Gabriel Péri, who was executed by German forces at Fort Mont-Valérien in December 1941 during the war.
