= Jean de Bonsi =

His Eminence Jean de Bonsi
- Cardinal priest of Sant'Eusebio; Member of Congregation for Universal Inquisition
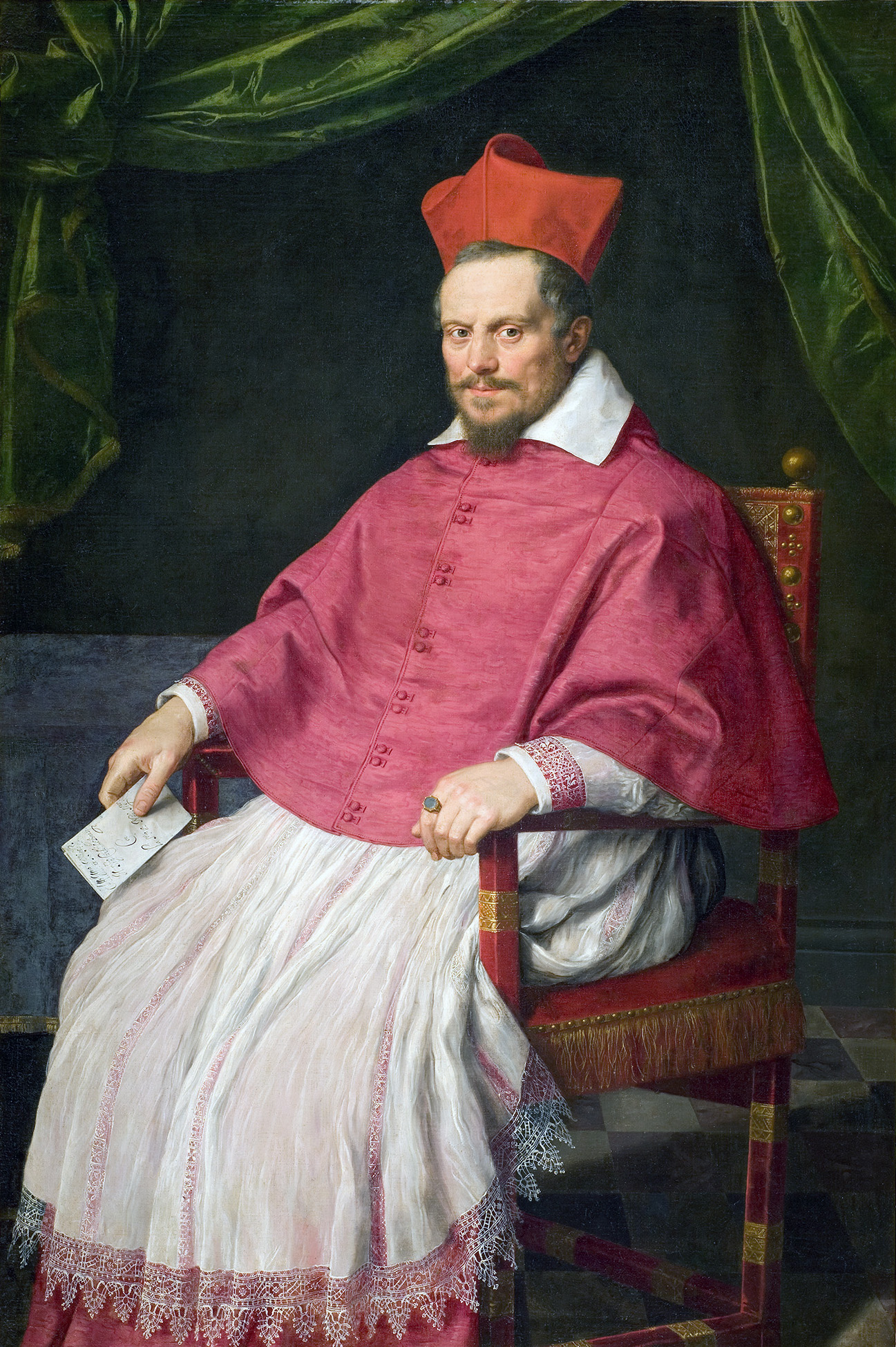
- See: Bishop of Béziers Emeritus
- Installed: 20 July 1615—4 July 1621
- Predecessor: Tommaso Bonsi
- Successor: Domenico Bonsi
- Other post: Previously Cardinal priest of San Clemente al Laterano

Orders
- Created cardinal: 17 August 1611

Personal details
- Born: 1554 Florence, Italy
- Died: 4 July 1621 (aged 66–67) Rome

Jean de Bonsi (Florence, 1554 – 4 July 1621) was born in Florence, Italy to Domenico Bonsi, prime minister of the Duke of Tuscany, and Costanza Vettori.

== Early life and studies ==
He studied in University of Padua canon and civil law. Ferdinando I de' Medici, Grand Duke of Tuscany, named him an arbiter on the differences between him and Pope Clement VIII, concerning territorial limits. Later he became lawyer in Rome.

== Episcopate ==
He was named Bishop of Béziers (nowadays part of the Archdiocese of Montpellier) after his uncle Tommaso Bonsi on 11 February 1598 and consecrated on 30 September that year. He served as bishop till 1611 and was succeeded by his nephew Domenico Bonsi - coadjutor bishop of the same diocese, followed by other members of the Bonsi family.

== Cardinalate ==
Jean de Bonsi was created cardinal priest in the consistory of 17 August 1611 by Pope Paul V.

Later in 1615, he received the red hat and was appointed to the title of San Clemente al Laterano until 1621, when he was opted for the title of Sant'Eusebio for about six months before his death on 4 July 1621 in Rome.
