= Piero de Bonzi =

Italian-French Roman Catholic cardinal

- Archbishop of Narbonne
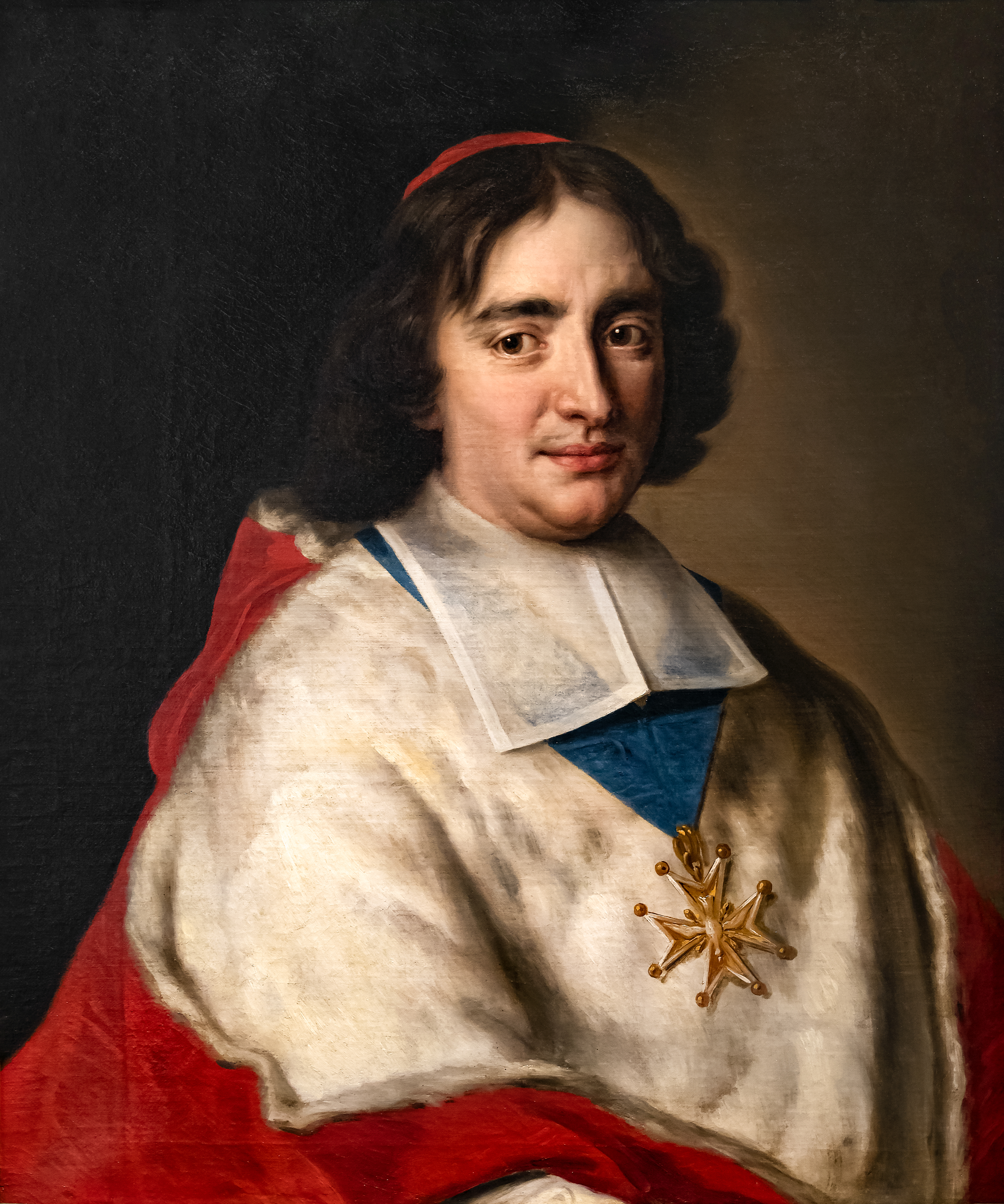
- Piero de Bonzi by Jean de Troy
- See: Archdiocese of Narbonne (now suppressed)
- Installed: 12 March 1674—11 July 1703
- Other post: Previously Archbishop of Toulouse

Orders
- Created cardinal: 1672

Personal details
- Born: 15 April 1631 Florence, Italy
- Died: 11 July 1703 (aged 72) Montpellier, France

Piero de Bonzi (also Pierre; 15 April 1631 - 11 July 1703) was an Italian-French Roman Catholic cardinal. His last name is also listed as Bonsi.

== Biography ==
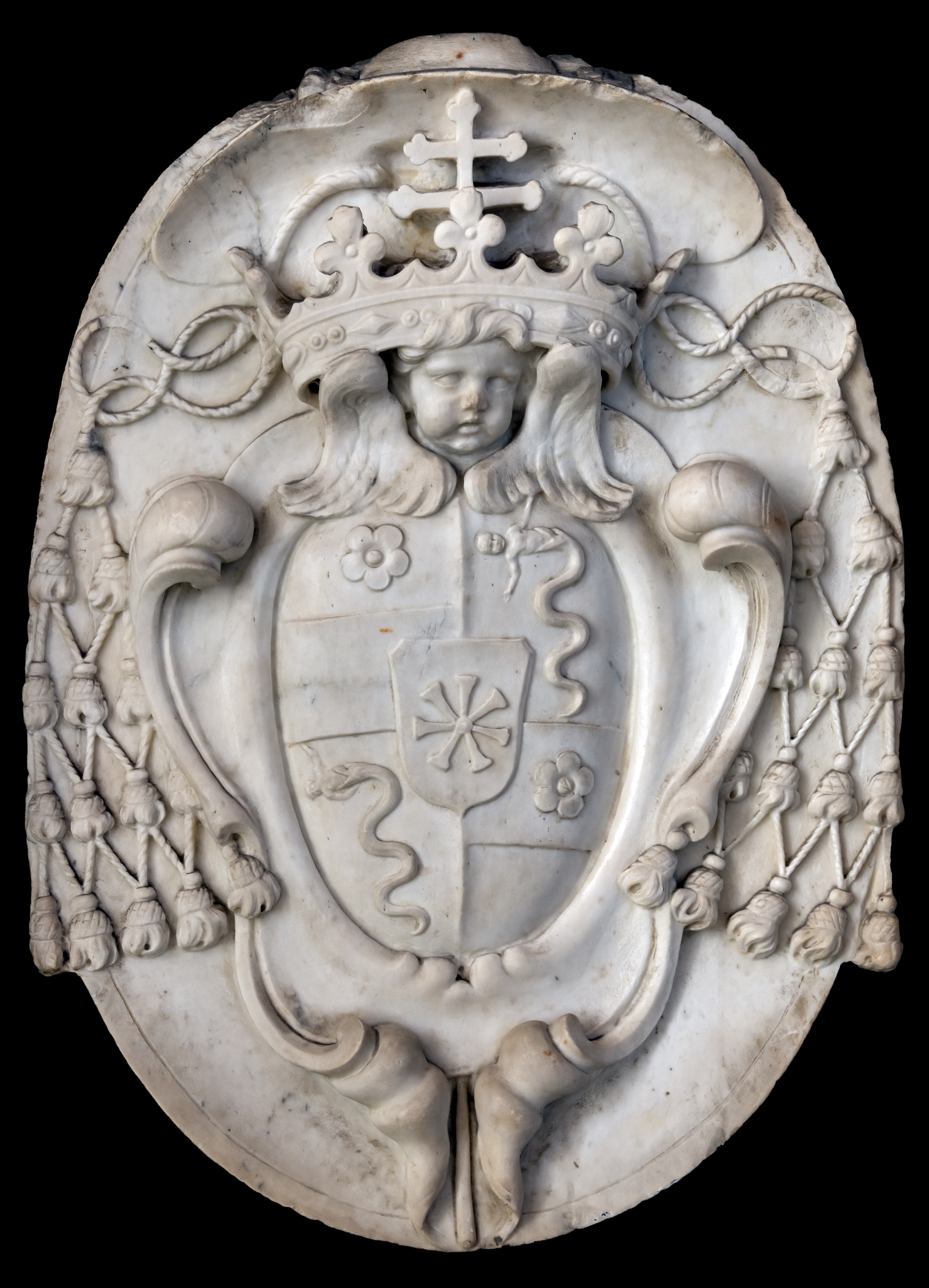
Coat of arms of Pierre de Bonzy - Staircase of the palace of the Archbishops of Narbonne

Coat of arms

Born in Florence, he was the son of Francesco Bonzi, senator of Florence, and Cristina Riari. He was also grand-nephew of Cardinal Jean de Bonsi.

He was educated by his uncle Clément Bonzi, bishop of Béziers, who made him join the ecclesiastical state and he became Resident of Ferdinando II de' Medici, Grand Duke of Tuscany in the French court. Later, he was appointed commendatory abbot of several abbeys in France.

Piere de Bonzi was elected bishop of Béziers on 7 June 1660, the 5th member of the family to become bishop of that see. Later, he became French ambassador in different countries in Europe. On 28 September 1671, he was promoted to the metropolitan see of Toulouse.

In 1672, Bonzi was created cardinal priest by Pope Clement X, and transferred to the metropolitan see of Narbonne two years later. He participated in the Papal conclaves of 1676, 1689 and 1691. He opted for the title of Sant'Onofrio on 19 October 1676. Then, he was transferred to the title of S. Pietro in Vincoli and later opted for the title of Sant'Eusebio. From about 1693, he suffered from epilepsy and because of poor health did not participate in the Papal conclave of 1700.

He died on 11 July 1703 of an apoplexy, in Montpellier.
