= Béziers =

City in Hérault, France

Béziers Besièrs (Occitan)
- Subprefecture and commune
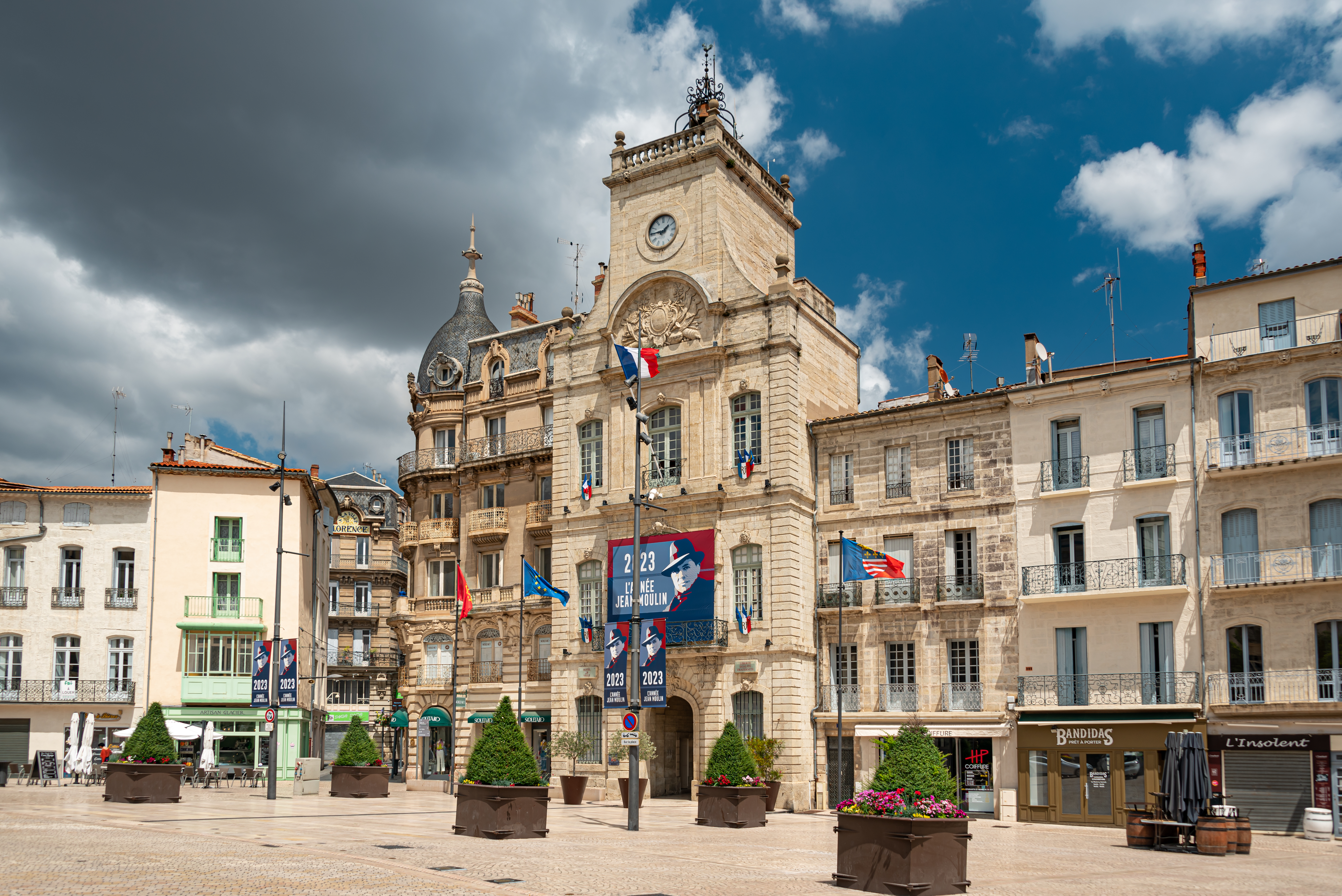
- Town hall

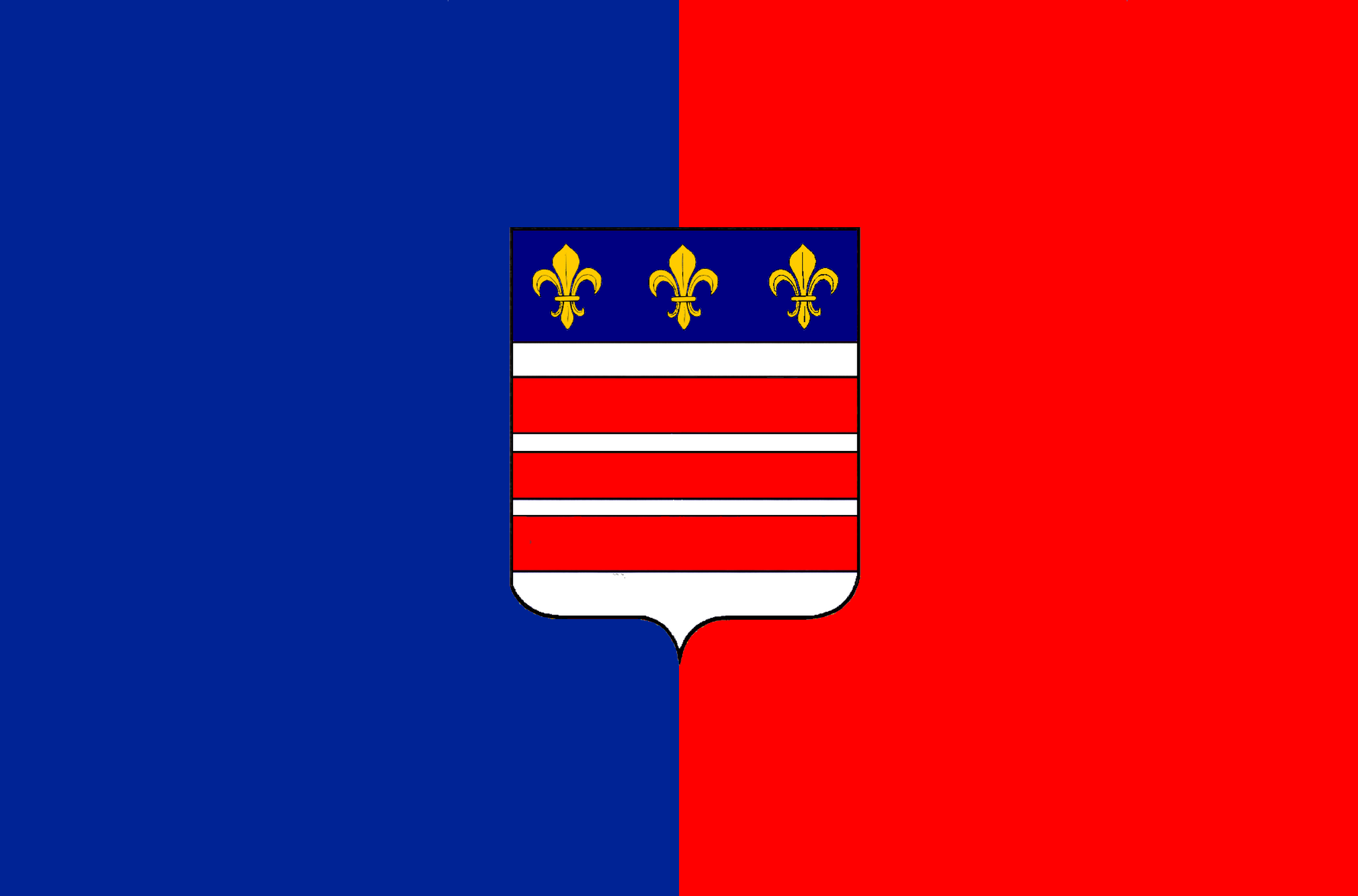
- Flag Coat of arms
- Location of Béziers
- Location within France Location within Occitanie
- Coordinates: 43°20′51″N 3°13′08″E
- Country: France
- Region: Occitania
- Department: Hérault
- Arrondissement: Béziers
- Canton: Béziers-1, 2 and 3
- Intercommunality: CA Béziers Méditerranée

Government
  - Mayor (2020–2026): Robert Ménard (DVD)
- Area^{1}: 95.48 km^{2} (36.87 sq mi)
- Elevation: 17 m (56 ft)
- Highest elevation: 120 m (390 ft)
- Lowest elevation: 4 m (13 ft)
- Population (2023): 81,545
  - Density: 854.1/km^{2} (2,212/sq mi)
- Demonym: Biterrois
- Time zone: UTC+01:00 (CET)
  - Summer (DST): UTC+02:00 (CEST)
- INSEE/Postal code: 34032 /34500
- ^{1} French Land Register data, which excludes lakes, ponds, glaciers > 1 km^{2} (0.386 sq mi or 247 acres) and river estuaries.

Béziers (French: [bezje]; Occitan: Besièrs) is a city in southern France. It is a subprefecture of the Hérault department in the Occitanie region. Every August Béziers hosts the famous Feria de Béziers, which is centred on bullfighting. A million visitors are attracted to the five-day event.

The town is located on a small bluff above the river Orb, about ten kilometres (six miles) from the Mediterranean coast and 75 kilometres (47 miles) southwest of Montpellier. At Béziers, the Canal du Midi passes over the river Orb by means of the Pont-canal de l'Orb, an aqueduct claimed to be the first of its kind.

== History ==
Béziers is one of the oldest cities in France. Research published in March 2013 shows that the ancient Greek colony of Béziers dates from 575 BCE, making it older than Agde (Greek Agathe Tyche, founded in 525 BCE) and slightly younger than Marseille (Greek Massalia, founded in 600 BCE).

The site has been occupied since Neolithic times, before the influx of Celts. Roman Betarra was on the road that linked Provence with Iberia. The Romans refounded the city as a new colonia for veterans in 36–35 BCE and called it Colonia Julia Baeterrae Septimanorum. Stones from the Roman amphitheatre were used to construct the city wall during the third century.

Béziers exported wine to Rome. A dolium discovered in an excavation near Rome is marked, "I am a wine from Baeterrae and I am five years old." Another is simply marked, "white wine of Baeterrae." Béziers was conquered by the Muslims and remained part of Islamic Iberia between 720 and 752.

From the 10th to the 12th centuries, Béziers was the centre of a Viscountship of Béziers. The viscounts ruled most of the coastal plain around Béziers, including the town of Agde. They also controlled the major east–west route through Languedoc, which roughly follows the old Roman Via Domitia, with the two key bridges over the Orb at Béziers and over the Hérault at Saint-Thibéry.

After the death of Viscount William around 990, the viscounty passed to his daughter Garsendis and her husband, Count Raimond-Roger of Carcassonne (d. c. 1012). It was then ruled by their son Peter-Raimond (d. c. 1060) and his son Roger (d. 1067), both of whom were also counts of Carcassonne.

Roger died without issue and Béziers passed to his sister Ermengard and her husband Raimond-Bertrand Trencavel. The Trencavels ruled for the next 142 years, until the Albigensian Crusade, a formal crusade (holy war) authorised by Pope Innocent III.

=== Massacre at Béziers ===
Béziers was a stronghold of Catharism, which the Catholic Church condemned as heretical and exterminated in the Albigensian Crusade.

The crusaders reached Béziers on 21 July 1209. Béziers' Catholics were given an ultimatum to hand over the heretics or leave before the crusaders besieged the city and to "avoid sharing their fate and perishing with them". However, many refused and resisted with the Cathars. The town was sacked the following day and in the bloody massacre no one was spared, not even Catholic priests and those who took refuge in the churches.

One of the commanders of the crusade was the Papal legate Arnaud-Amaury (or Arnald Amalaricus, abbot of Citeaux). When asked by a crusader how to tell Catholics from Cathars once they had taken the city, the abbot supposedly replied, "Caedite eos. Novit enim Dominus qui sunt eius" ("Kill them all, for the Lord knoweth them that are His"). (This oft-quoted phrase is sourced from Caesarius of Heisterbach along with a story of all the heretics who desecrated a copy of the Gospels and threw it down from the town's walls.) Amalric's own version of the siege, described in his letter to Pope Innocent III in August 1209 (col. 139), states:

While discussions were still going on with the barons about the release of those in the city who were deemed to be Catholics, the servants and other persons of low rank and unarmed attacked the city without waiting for orders from their leaders. To our amazement, crying "to arms, to arms!", within the space of two or three hours they crossed the ditches and the walls and Béziers was taken. Our men spared no one, irrespective of rank, sex or age, and put to the sword almost 20,000 people. After this great slaughter the whole city was despoiled and burnt ...

The invaders burned the Cathedral of Saint Nazaire, which collapsed on those who had taken refuge inside. The town was pillaged and burnt. By some accounts, none were left alive—by others, there were a handful of survivors. (A plaque opposite the cathedral records the "Day of Butchery" perpetrated by the "northern barons".)

=== Later Middle Ages ===
Despite the massacre, the city was repopulated. A few parts of the Romanesque cathedral of St-Nazaire had survived the carnage, and repairs started in 1215. The restoration, along with that of the rest of the city, continued until the 15th century.

Béziers became part of the royal domain in 1247.

A school of troubadours arose at Béziers in the 1260s–80s, with four poets: Bernart d'Auriac, Joan Esteve, Joan Miralhas, and Raimon Gaucelm. The latter three were natives of Béziers. All four lived there and were members of the urban middle class and not courtesans: Miralhas was possibly a potter and Bernart a teacher. They wrote in Occitan but supported the French king Louis IX and the French aristocracy against the native Occitan nobility, and have been described as "gallicised". Raimon Gaucelm supported the Eighth Crusade and even wrote a planh, the only known one of its kind, to a burgher of Béziers. Joan Esteve and Bernart both composed in support of the French in the Aragonese Crusade. These poets are a shining example of the transformation of Occitania in the aftermath of the Albigensian Crusade, but also of the ability of troubadours to survive it.

Rule of the city was for a long time divided among three powers: the Bishopric, which reached its apogee in the 16th and 17th centuries when it was held by the Bonsi family, allied to the Medici; the consuls, local magistrates created at the end of the 12th century; and finally the king, represented by a "Viguier for judicial affairs", and from the 17th century onwards by a sub-delegate of the Intendant.

Béziers was not damaged in the Hundred Years' War.

On 8 September 1381, a riot broke out at the seat of the municipal council, rioters setting the Town House on fire. The councillors tried to take refuge in the tower, but fire spread there as well, and they all died either by fire or in jumping from the tower to the square.

=== Early modern times ===
King Charles IX passed through the city during his royal tour of France (1564–1566), accompanied by the Court and the great men of the kingdom: his brother Henry, the Duke of Anjou, his distant cousin Henri of Navarre, and the Cardinal of Bourbon with the Cardinal of Lorraine.

In 1551, Béziers became the seat of a seneschal, being removed from the jurisdiction of the seneschals of Carcassonne.

The city served as a rear base during various wars of the modern period, especially those against the Habsburgs. It was only once directly threatened. During the War of the Spanish Succession, the British in 1710 landed at Sète and moved to within a few kilometres of Béziers, before being repulsed by the Duke of Roquelaure. Béziers was at the heart of the Montmorency Revolt in 1632. It was in Béziers that Gaston d'Orléans and Henri II de Montmorency, Governor of Languedoc, met at the beginning of the rebellion. It was also here that the king, by the Edict of Béziers (October 1632), abolished the privileges of the province. (They were restored in 1649.)

During the 18th century, Béziers prospered, notably thanks to the cultivation of vines which enabled it to become an important centre for alcohol trading.

=== French Revolution ===
During the French Revolution, citizens of Béziers met in a revolutionary society created in May 1790 and numbering up to 400 members. It had several successive names: first, "The Literary and Patriotic Cabinet", a name still derived from the social life of the Ancien Régime; it then became "Society of the Friends of the Constitution and Liberty". Later becoming affiliated to the Jacobin Club of Paris, the Béziers organization was accordingly renamed the "Society of the Jacobins"; then, the abolition of the French monarchy precipitated two further changes of name: "Society of Brothers and Friends of the Republic" and then "Regenerated Society of the Jacobins, Friends of the Republic".

From 1790 to 1800, Béziers was the chief town of the district of Béziers. The city did not take part in the Girondin ("Federalist") movement.

=== Napoleon III, 1851 ===
In the repression following Louis Napoléon's coup d'état in 1851, troops fired on and killed Republican protesters in Béziers. Others were condemned to death or transported to Guiana, including Casimir Peret, the mayor at the time, who died at sea attempting to escape from there. In the Place de la Révolution a plaque and a monument by Jean Antoine Injalbert commemorates these events. Injalbert also designed the Fontaine du Titan in Béziers's Plâteau des Poètes park.

=== The Languedoc vine growers' revolt in Béziers, 1907 ===
While elsewhere in France, the area planted with vines was decreasing, it increased in the departments of Aude, Gard, Hérault and the Pyrénées-Orientales. Together, these supplied some 40% of French wine production. Haut Languedoc, and more particularly the Biterrois and Béziers, proclaimed themselves to be "The World Capital of Wine" and grew rapidly. Great fortunes were made. Large landowners, coming from industry, finance or the liberal professions, gained possession of immense vineyards.

There was also a growing foreign competition, with smuggled wines appearing on the market. The fraudsters remained unpunished. In 1892, the winegrowers of the Midi demanded "The restoration and enforcement of customs duties". But the market remained partly held by wines made from imported dried grapes (such as grapes from Corinth ), and wines called "wet" (adulterated with water). Though the vintners attached great importance to this unfair competition, in fact it did not represent more than 5% of the market.

On 12 May 1907, no less than 150,000 protesters gathered in Béziers with the declared aim of "Defending the Southern Viticulture". The crowd spilled into Paul-Riquet and the Champ-de-Mars. The slogans on the banners Proclaimed: "Victory or death! Enough of talking, the time has come for action! Death to fraudsters! Bread or death! Live by working or die fighting!".

The demonstrators, who came from more than 200 communes, were joined by numerous Biterrois employees and shopkeepers. The event ended with speeches on the Place de la Citadelle, (now Place Jean-Jaurès). the Speakers included Marcelin Albert who issued an ultimatum to the government, demanding that it raise the price of wine, Ernest Ferroul who advocated tax refusal and the Béziers Mayor Émile Suchon, (close to Clemenceau), who took a stand in support of the winegrowers' struggle. There were some minor incidents during the dispersal of the demonstrators.

On 16 May, the Béziers municipal council, of Radical and Socialist tendency, resigned. The pressure of the street continued. The police station and the town hall façade were set on fire. Alerted, Georges Clemenceau decided to launch a counterattack. The 17th regiment of line infantry, composed of reservists and conscripts, was on his orders transferred from Béziers to Agde on 18 June 1907.

On the evening of 20 June, learning of the Narbonne shooting, about 500 soldiers of the 6th company of the 17th regiment mutinied, plundered the armory and headed for Béziers. They traveled about twenty kilometers by night. On 21 June, in the early morning, they arrived in town. They were warmly welcomed by the Biterrois, "fraternizing with the demonstrators, and peacefully opposing the armed forces". The soldiers sat down on the Allées Paul Riquet and the population offered them wine and food.

The South was on the brink of insurrection. In Paulhan, the railway was taken out of commission by protesters who stopped a military convoy sent to quell the mutineers. In Lodève, the sub-prefect was taken hostage. The military authorities were not ready to accept this mutiny, apprehensive that the example of the 17th regiment would give similar ideas to other regiments in the region.

In Paris, the Republic trembled, as Clemenceau had to face a vote of no confidence. However, he survived by letting the military command urgently negotiate with the mutineers. In the afternoon, after obtaining a guarantee that no sanctions will be imposed on them, the 17th soldiers put down their arms and marched to the station under escort, without any major incident. On 22 June, they returned by train to their barracks. Clemenceau announced the end of the mutiny and gained a parliamentary vote of confidence by 327 votes to 223.

On 23 June, a law was finally passed, which repressed the massive chaptalisation of the wines.

Negotiations and the scale of the movement prevented collective punishment: the mutineers of the 17th were assigned to Gafsa (Tunisia), a place where soldiers were often sent for "disciplinary companies", but these soldiers remained outside this framework, and were under ordinary military status. There was therefore no penal sanction for the revolt of the 17th, contrary to the legend that developed on this subject. However, during the First World War, haunted by their reputation as deserters, many of them were sent to the front line, particularly in the bloody assaults of 1914.

The mutiny of soldiers of the 17th has remained in historical memory, especially with the words of Montéhus' anti-militarist song "Gloire au 17", with the refrain: "Salute, salute to you / Brave soldiers of the seventeenth...."

=== 20th century ===
Before 1963, wine was the only way to bring money into the area. Béziers city is now a part of economic plan Mission Racine.

== Geography ==
=== Climate ===
Béziers has a Mediterranean climate (Köppen climate classification Csa). The average annual temperature in Béziers is 15.1 °C (59.2 °F). The average annual rainfall is 595.7 mm (23.45 in) with October as the wettest month. The temperatures are highest on average in July, at around 24.1 °C (75.4 °F), and lowest in January, at around 7.5 °C (45.5 °F). The highest temperature ever recorded in Béziers was 42.0 °C (107.6 °F) on 7 July 1982; the coldest temperature ever recorded was −16.0 °C (3.2 °F) on 16 January 1985.

Climate data for Béziers (1991–2020 normals, extremes 1970–present)
| Month | Jan | Feb | Mar | Apr | May | Jun | Jul | Aug | Sep | Oct | Nov | Dec | Year |
|---|---|---|---|---|---|---|---|---|---|---|---|---|---|
| Record high °C (°F) | 22.9 (73.2) | 24.7 (76.5) | 29.2 (84.6) | 32.4 (90.3) | 35.9 (96.6) | 39.2 (102.6) | 42.0 (107.6) | 41.3 (106.3) | 38.8 (101.8) | 33.2 (91.8) | 25.7 (78.3) | 22.5 (72.5) | 42.0 (107.6) |
| Mean daily maximum °C (°F) | 12.1 (53.8) | 13.2 (55.8) | 16.6 (61.9) | 19.1 (66.4) | 23.2 (73.8) | 28.0 (82.4) | 30.9 (87.6) | 30.6 (87.1) | 26.0 (78.8) | 21.0 (69.8) | 15.9 (60.6) | 12.5 (54.5) | 20.8 (69.4) |
| Daily mean °C (°F) | 8.0 (46.4) | 8.4 (47.1) | 11.4 (52.5) | 13.9 (57.0) | 17.7 (63.9) | 21.8 (71.2) | 24.4 (75.9) | 24.1 (75.4) | 20.0 (68.0) | 16.3 (61.3) | 11.6 (52.9) | 8.4 (47.1) | 15.5 (59.9) |
| Mean daily minimum °C (°F) | 3.8 (38.8) | 3.6 (38.5) | 6.2 (43.2) | 8.6 (47.5) | 12.1 (53.8) | 15.5 (59.9) | 17.9 (64.2) | 17.6 (63.7) | 14.1 (57.4) | 11.5 (52.7) | 7.3 (45.1) | 4.3 (39.7) | 10.2 (50.4) |
| Record low °C (°F) | −16.0 (3.2) | −7.4 (18.7) | −9.6 (14.7) | −4.1 (24.6) | 0.2 (32.4) | 5.9 (42.6) | 7.8 (46.0) | 7.6 (45.7) | 2.5 (36.5) | −4.0 (24.8) | −9.3 (15.3) | −9.0 (15.8) | −16.0 (3.2) |
| Average precipitation mm (inches) | 51.5 (2.03) | 50.8 (2.00) | 48.4 (1.91) | 53.8 (2.12) | 47.5 (1.87) | 26.7 (1.05) | 18.7 (0.74) | 26.2 (1.03) | 60.5 (2.38) | 90.5 (3.56) | 62.7 (2.47) | 47.7 (1.88) | 585.0 (23.03) |
| Average precipitation days (≥ 1.0 mm) | 5.6 | 4.3 | 4.9 | 6.4 | 5.6 | 3.9 | 2.5 | 3.6 | 4.1 | 5.7 | 5.8 | 5.0 | 57.5 |
Source: Meteociel

== Population ==
The inhabitants of Béziers are known as Biterrois, after Baeterrae, the Roman name for the town.

Historical population

| Year | Pop. | ±% p.a. |
|---|---|---|
| 1793 | 12,501 | — |
| 1800 | 14,535 | +2.18% |
| 1806 | 14,565 | +0.03% |
| 1821 | 16,140 | +0.69% |
| 1831 | 16,769 | +0.38% |
| 1836 | 16,233 | −0.65% |
| 1841 | 18,874 | +3.06% |
| 1846 | 19,596 | +0.75% |
| 1851 | 19,333 | −0.27% |
| 1856 | 23,557 | +4.03% |
| 1861 | 24,270 | +0.60% |
| 1866 | 27,722 | +2.70% |
| 1872 | 31,468 | +2.13% |
| 1876 | 38,227 | +4.98% |
| 1881 | 42,915 | +2.34% |
| 1886 | 42,785 | −0.06% |
| 1891 | 45,475 | +1.23% |
| 1896 | 48,012 | +1.09% |
| 1901 | 52,310 | +1.73% |

| Year | Pop. | ±% p.a. |
|---|---|---|
| 1906 | 52,268 | −0.02% |
| 1911 | 51,042 | −0.47% |
| 1921 | 56,008 | +0.93% |
| 1926 | 65,754 | +3.26% |
| 1931 | 71,527 | +1.70% |
| 1936 | 73,305 | +0.49% |
| 1946 | 64,561 | −1.26% |
| 1954 | 64,929 | +0.07% |
| 1962 | 73,538 | +1.57% |
| 1968 | 80,481 | +1.52% |
| 1975 | 84,029 | +0.62% |
| 1982 | 76,647 | −1.31% |
| 1990 | 70,996 | −0.95% |
| 1999 | 69,153 | −0.29% |
| 2007 | 72,462 | +0.59% |
| 2012 | 72,970 | +0.14% |
| 2017 | 77,177 | +1.13% |
| 2023 | 81,545 | +0.92% |

Source: EHESS and INSEE (1968–2023)

== Attractions ==
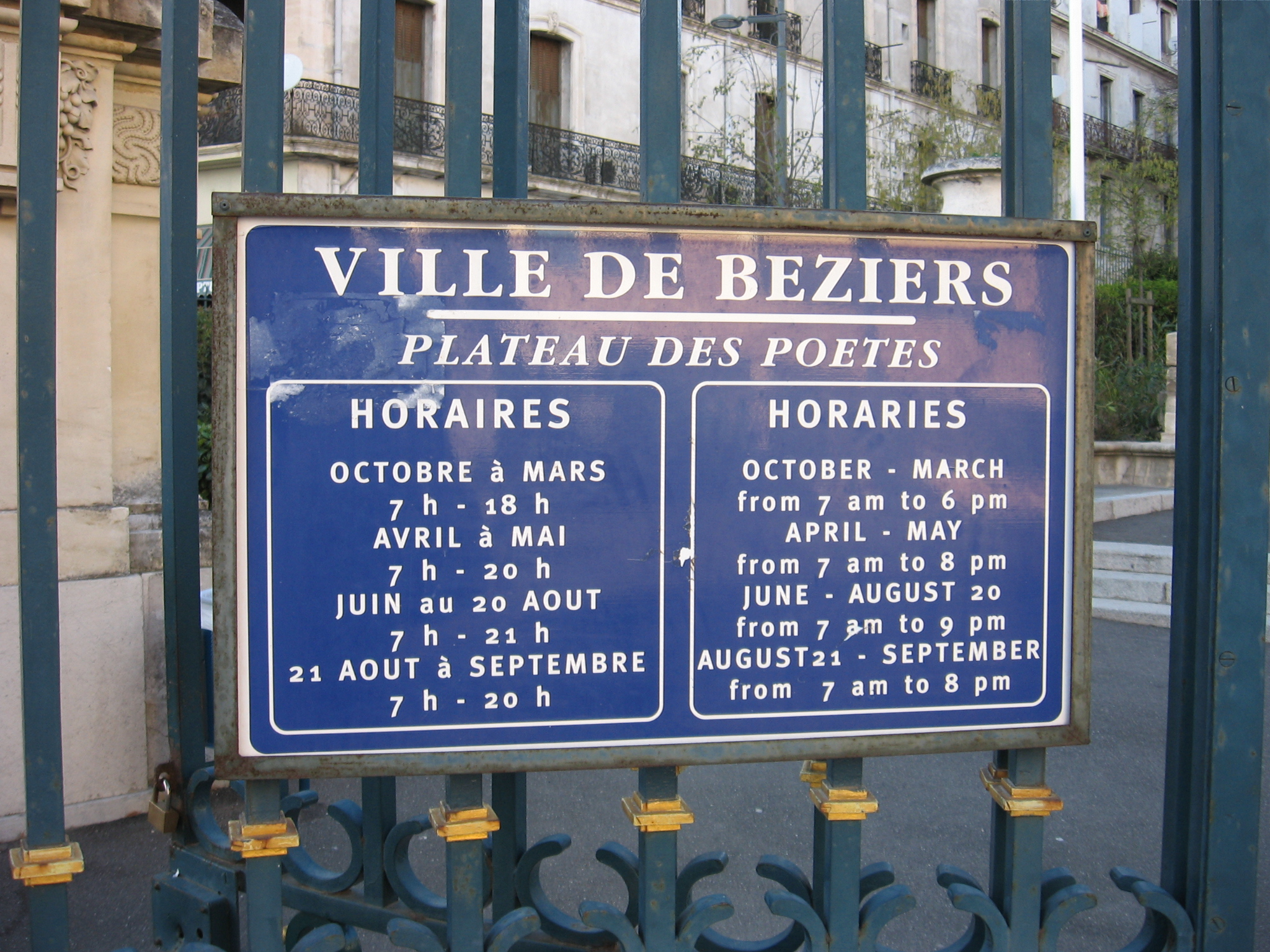
Entrance of The Plateau des Poètes

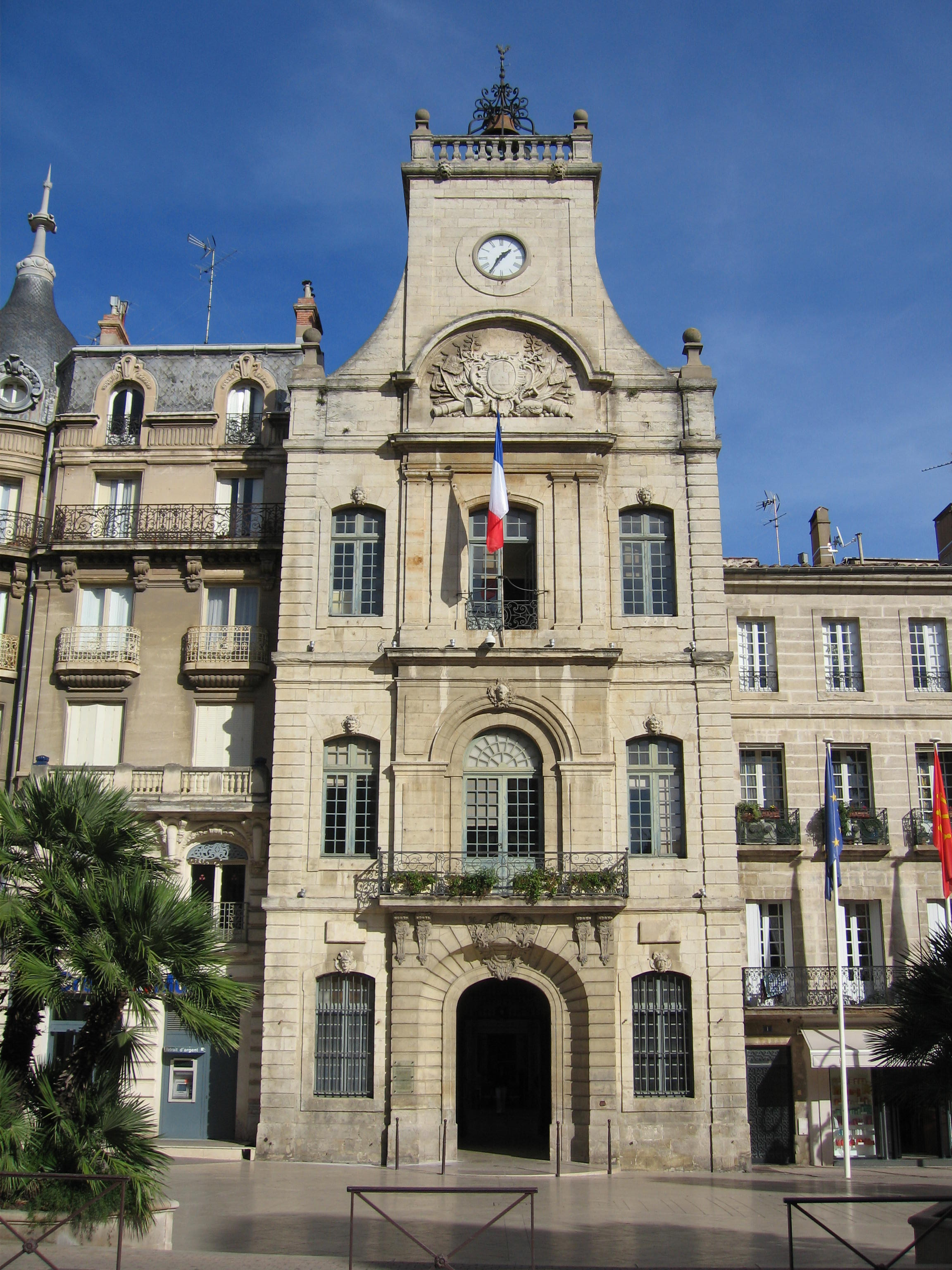
The Hôtel de Ville

- Saint-Nazaire Cathedral: Situated in the high part of town, it occupies a picturesque site, visible from afar when approaching Béziers on the road from Narbonne. A remarkable example of middle Gothic architecture from the 14th century, the vaulted nave, 14 m (45.93 ft) wide, reaches a height of 32 m (104.99 ft). The total length is 50 m (164.04 ft). The western rose window has a diameter of 10 m (32.81 ft).
- The Hôtel de Ville (town hall) dates from 1746.
- The Plateau des Poètes (1867): This vast English-style (naturalistic) park was laid out by landscape artists, the Bulher brothers. It contains numerous statues of poets and a monumental fountain of the Titan by Injalbert. The park connects the station with the allées Paul Riquet...
- The allées Paul Riquet, a major square, where a large bronze statue by David d'Angers celebrates the creator of the Canal du Midi, Pierre-Paul Riquet. The same sculptor created the bas reliefs which decorate the neo-Classical façade of the Municipal Theatre (1844) at the top of the allées. At times of the Feria, festivities are centred in the allées.
- Arenas: Béziers has two arenas, one dating from the Roman era whose structures and foundations have been preserved following major works in the Saint-Jacques district, and the other built in 1905 in the style of Spanish bullrings by Fernand Castelbon de Beauxhostes. The latter is one of the largest such structures in France (seating 13,100). The arena hosts concerts and, every August, a bullfighting festival (the Féria).
- The Fine Arts Museum (musée des Beaux-Arts), founded in 1859, received in 1934 the legacy of Injalbert's widow and, in 1975, drawings and the art collection of Jean Moulin. Among the museum's works are canvasses by Hans Holbein, Sébastien Bourdon, Géricault, Vincent van Gogh, Chaïm Soutine and Henri Goetz.
- The musée Saint-Jacques, installed in a former barracks, has collections showing life in the Béziers region (Biterrois).
- Le Pont Vieux is a stone bridge crossing the Orb (Middle Ages).
- Le Cimetière Vieux (Old Cemetery), created in the 18th century, is a true open-air museum with numerous tombs and works of art by local sculptors, including Jean Magrou and Injalbert.
- Pierre-Paul Riquet's Canal du Midi (17th century) Béziers installations: the Pont-canal de l'Orb canal aqueduct; the Fonserannes staircase locks; the hapless Fonserannes "water slope"; and the Fonserannes lock continuation (now also hors service) to the River Orb.

Other sites and monuments

- The Cordier or Bagnols mill
- Saint-Jacques Church
- The Saint-Aphrodise Church
- Church of the Madeleine
- Saint Jude Church
- Church of the Immaculate Conception and its glazed tile roof
- The Capnau quarter
- Island of Tabarka, on the Orb
- The Municipal Theatre (19th century)
- The Art Nouveau former Théâtre des Variétés
- The market hall (end of the 19th century)
- The Saint-Jean-d'Aureilhan estate
- The Domaine de Bayssan
- Chapelle du Jardin Notre-Dame (18th century)
- Chapelle des Pénitents Bleus (18th century)

Other sights in the area include the Oppidum d'Ensérune archaeological site and the Étang de Montady, a marsh drained in 1247 to create a field and irrigation system which is visible from the Oppidum d'Ensérune.

== Economy ==
Béziers is a principal centre of the Languedoc viticulture and wine making industries.

== Transport ==
Road: The A9 autoroute between Italy and Spain skirts Béziers. The final link in the A75 autoroute between Pézenas and the A9 was completed in December 2010 and provides direct links to Clermont-Ferrand and Paris.

Rail: The Gare de Béziers is a railway station with connections to Toulouse, Montpellier, Bordeaux, Marseille, Paris, Barcelona and several regional destinations. TGV trains stop in Béziers, but the tracks between Montpellier and Spain are not yet high-speed tracks.

Air: Béziers Cap d'Agde Airport (previously Béziers-Agde-Vias Airport), owned by the Chamber of commerce and industry, provides connections to destinations in northern Europe. Following an extension to the runway which was completed in March 2007, Ryanair began flights to and from Bristol Airport in March 2008, and later to London Stansted and London Luton Airport. Current (January 2013) destinations from this airport with Ryanair are Bristol, London Luton Airport, Paris Beauvais, Oslo Rygge, Manchester, Edinburgh, Weeze Airport and Stockholm Skavsta, while Flybe serves Southampton. The nearest major airport is Montpellier - Méditerranée Airport, located 76 km (47 mi) north east of Béziers.

Canal: Primarily used today by trip boats and plaisanciers, the Canal du Midi is still used commercially to carry Languedoc wine to Bordeaux for blending. The canals locks have a maximum length of 30 m, slightly less than the 38.5 m adopted under the later Freycinet standard. Although parts of the River Orb are navigable, the river is interrupted by a number of impassable weirs.

== Sport ==
Béziers' rugby union team is AS Béziers Hérault, the football team is AS Béziers (2007) which plays in Championnat National 2. The women's volleyball team, the Béziers Angels, won the national LNV Ligue A Féminine in 2018.

== Notable people ==
- Jedaiah ben Abraham Bedersi (1270–1340), poet, philosopher and physician
- Abraham Bedersi, 13th-century Provençal Jewish poet
- Pierre-Paul Riquet (1609 or 1604–1680), engineer and canal-builder responsible for the construction of the Canal du Midi
- Paul Pellisson (1624–1693), author
- Jean Barbeyrac (1674?–1744), jurist
- Jean-Jacques d'Ortous de Mairan (1678–1771), geophysicist
- Jean-Henri-Nicolas Bouillet (1729–1790), physician and Encyclopédiste, mayor of Béziers from 1787 to 1790
- Pierre Jean Porro (1750–1831), guitarist, composer and music publisher
- Joseph-Henri baron de Jessé (1755–1794), nobleman and president of the National Constituent Assembly
- Jean Gailhac (1802–1890), priest, educator and founder of the Religious of the Sacred Heart of Mary
- Agénor Azéma de Montgravier (1805–1863), archeologist and Chef d'escadron in the Artillery
- Jean Antoine Ernest Constans (1833–1913), statesman
- Jean Antoine Injalbert (1845–1933), sculptor
- Valentin Duc (1858–1915), operatic tenor
- Gustave Fayet (1865–1925), artist, art collector, owner of Abbaye de Fontfroide
- Jean Magrou (1869–1945), sculptor
- Henri Fescourt (1880–1946), film director
- Mario Cazes (1890–1972), composer, conductor and violinist
- Jean Moulin (1899–1943), a hero of the French Resistance in the Second World War
- Edgar Faure (1908–1988), statesman
- Gabriel Bacquier (1924–2020), baritone
- Christian Metz (1931–1993), film theorist
- Jean-Pierre Escalettes (b. 1935), former president of the French Football Federation (2005–2010)
- Elisabeth Daynès (b. 1960), sculptor
- Damien Comolli (b. 1972), football director
- Dorian Astor (b. 1973), French philosopher and Germanist
- Julien Rodriguez (b. 1978), Olympique de Marseille footballer
- Jérémy Clément (b. 1984), Saint-Étienne footballer
- Aurélie Kamga (b. 1985), athlete
- Alexandra Rosenfeld (b. 1986), Miss France 2006, Miss Europe 2006
- Tristan Crama (b. 2001), Millwall footballer
- Richard Gasquet (b. 1986), French tennis player
- Thomas Heurtel (b 1989), basketball player
- Jim Pla (b.1992), racing driver
- Amale (b. 1993), wrestler
- Enzo Guibbert (b.1995), racing driver

== Cultural references ==
- The Kate Mosse novels Labyrinth and The Winter Ghosts draw on the history of Carcassonne, Béziers and the Cathars.
- Alan Tunbridge commemorated the Cathars in his song "Massacre at Béziers".
- Parts of the town, especially the cathedral, figure prominently in François Truffaut's film Une belle fille comme moi.

== Twinned towns ==
Béziers has been twinned with:

- Heilbronn, Germany, since 1965
- Tainan, Taiwan, since 2023
- Chiclana de la Frontera, Spain, since 1993
- Stavropol, Russia, since 1982
- Stockport, United Kingdom, since 1972
- Maaloula, Syria, since 2014
- Chortkiv, Ukraine, since 2022
- Nir Oz, Israel, since 2024

== Gallery ==
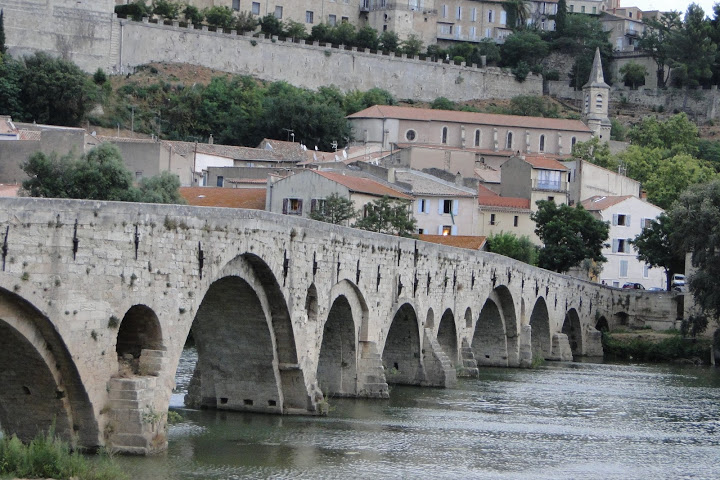
The old bridge

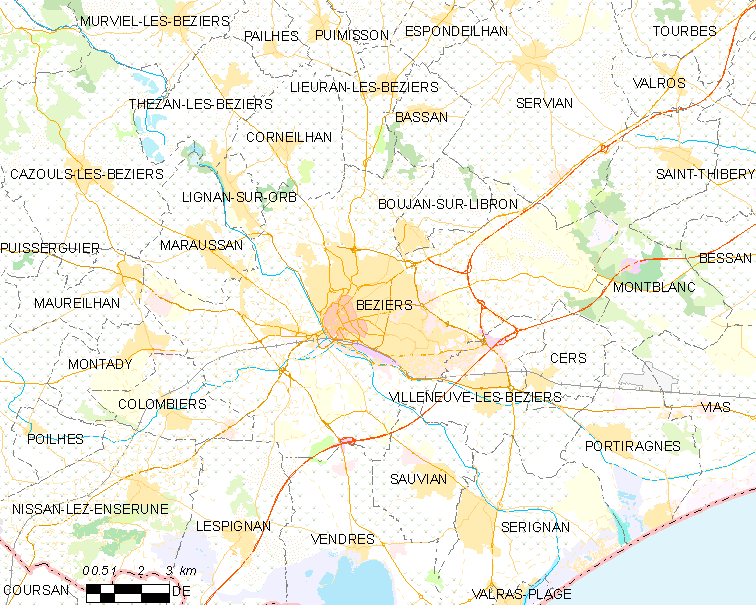
Map

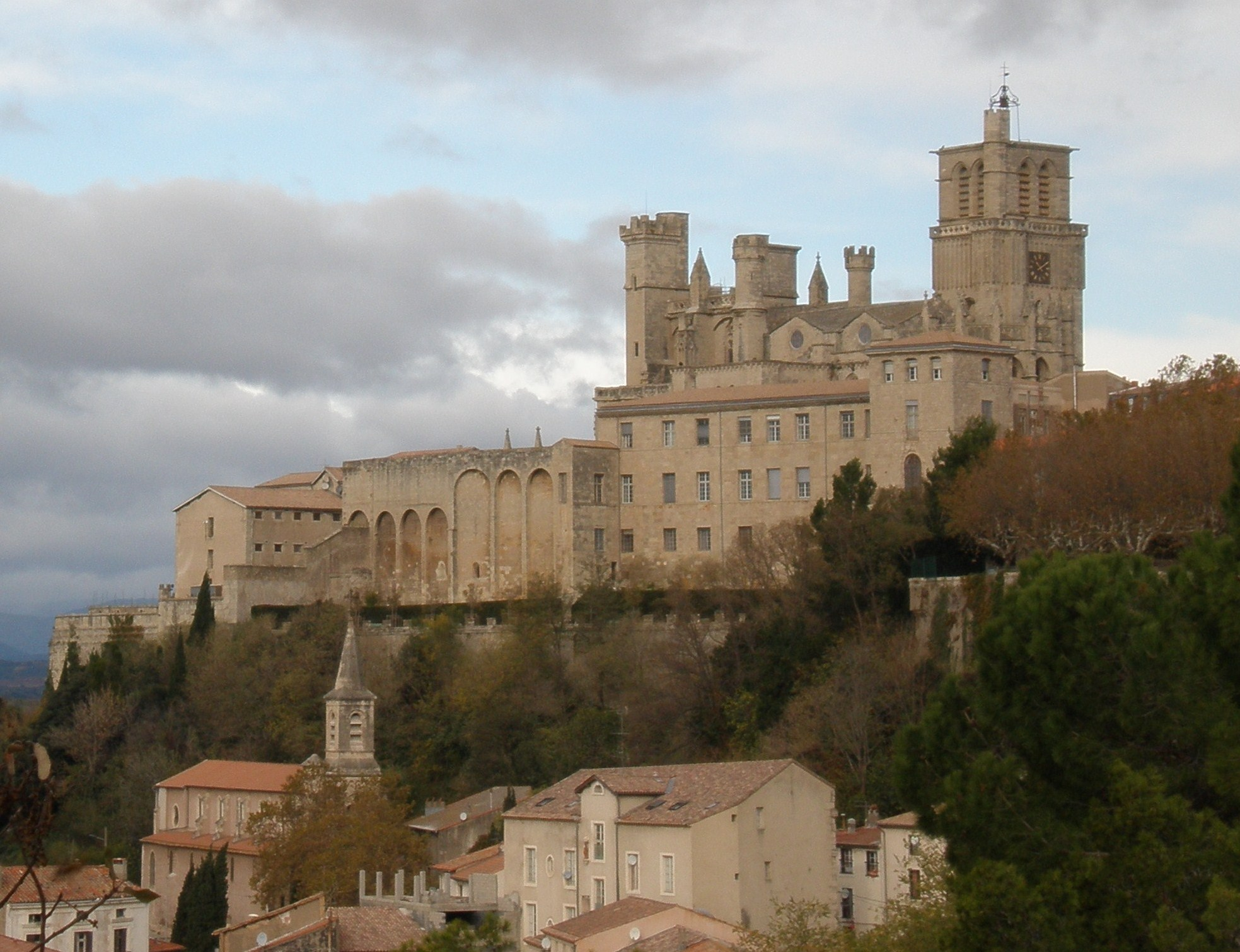
Saint-Nazaire cathedral

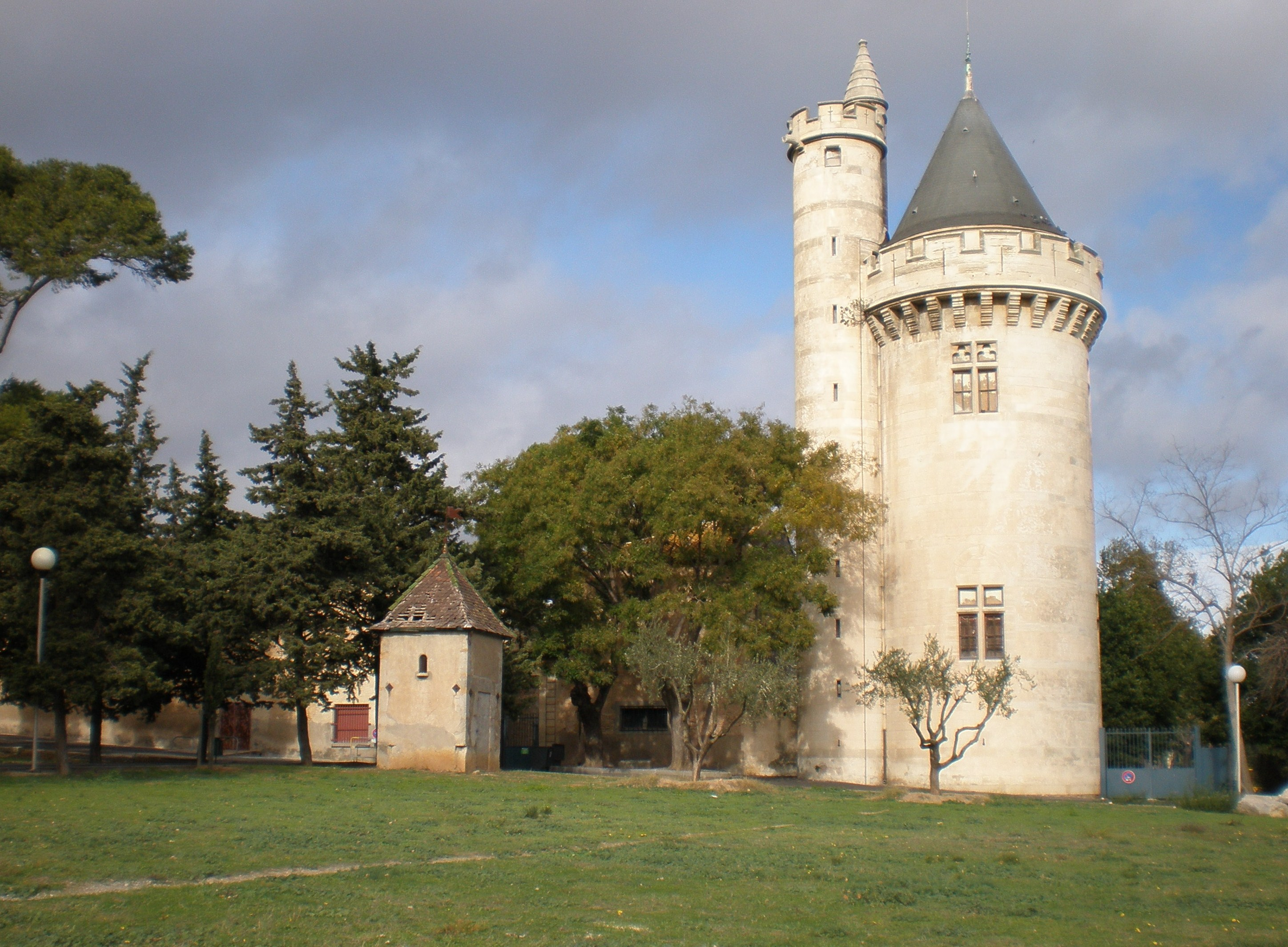
Le domaine de Saint-Jean-d'Aureilhan, neo-Gothic-style tower (19th century)

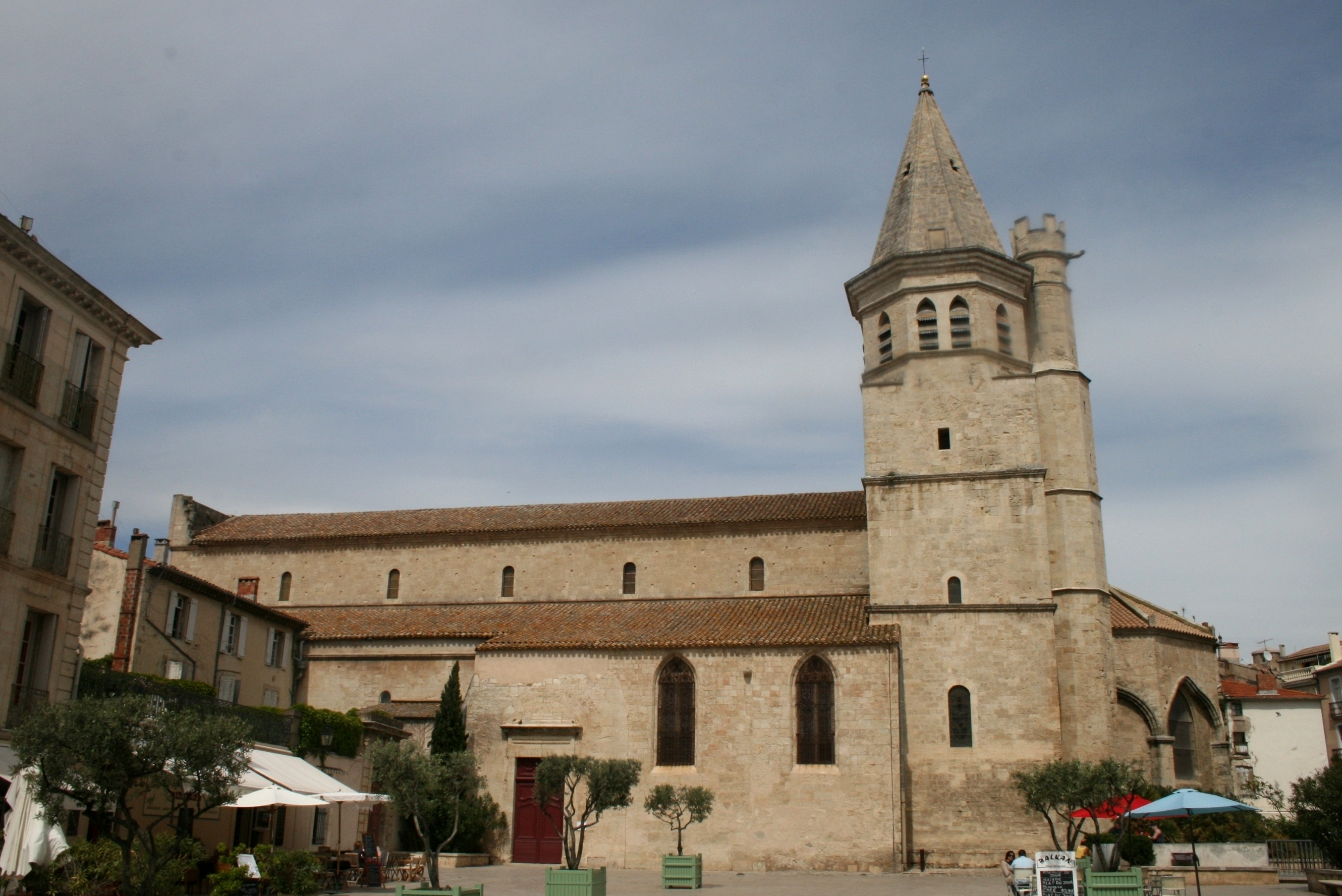
Église de la Madeleine

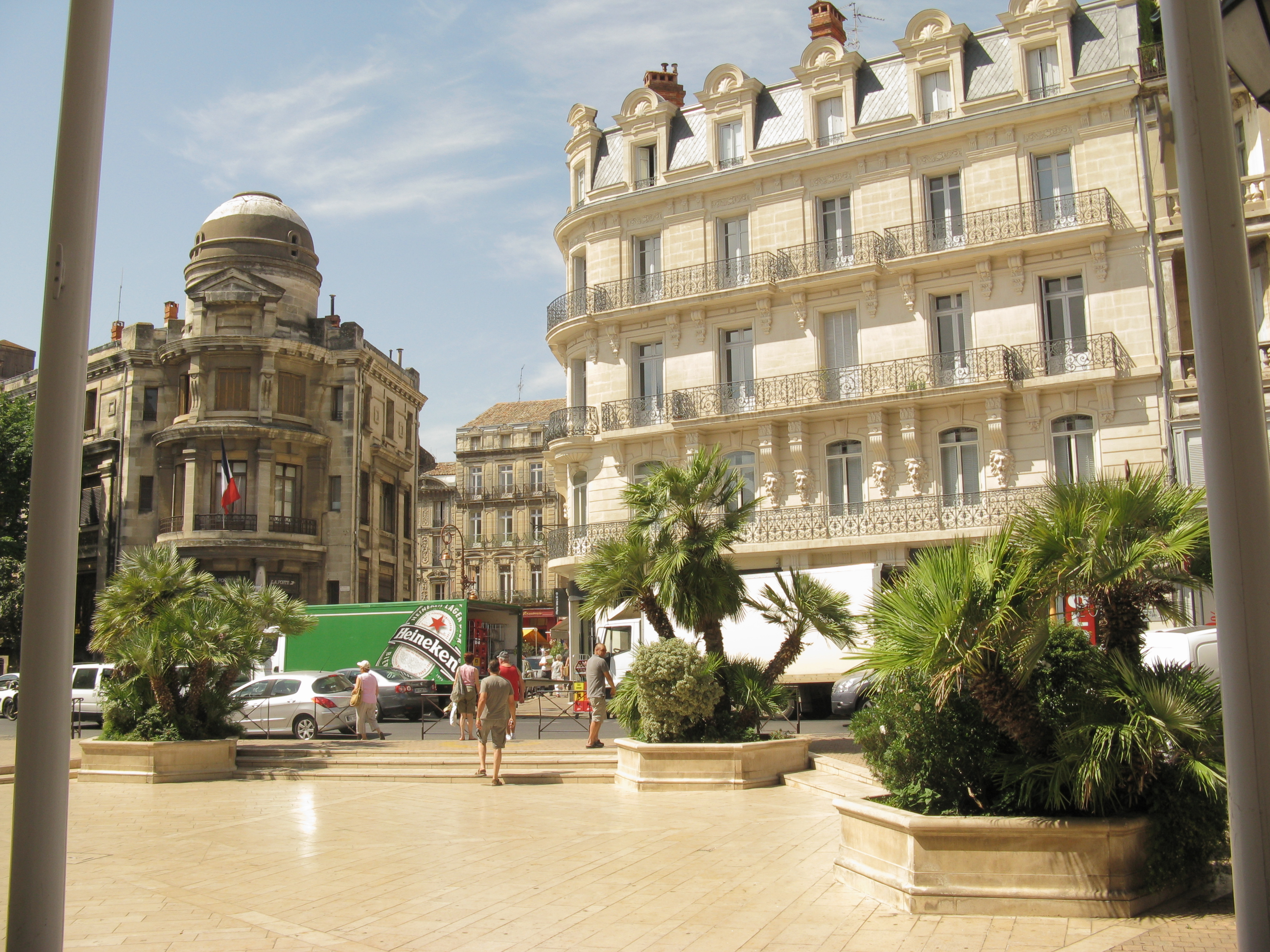
Place Gabriel Péri

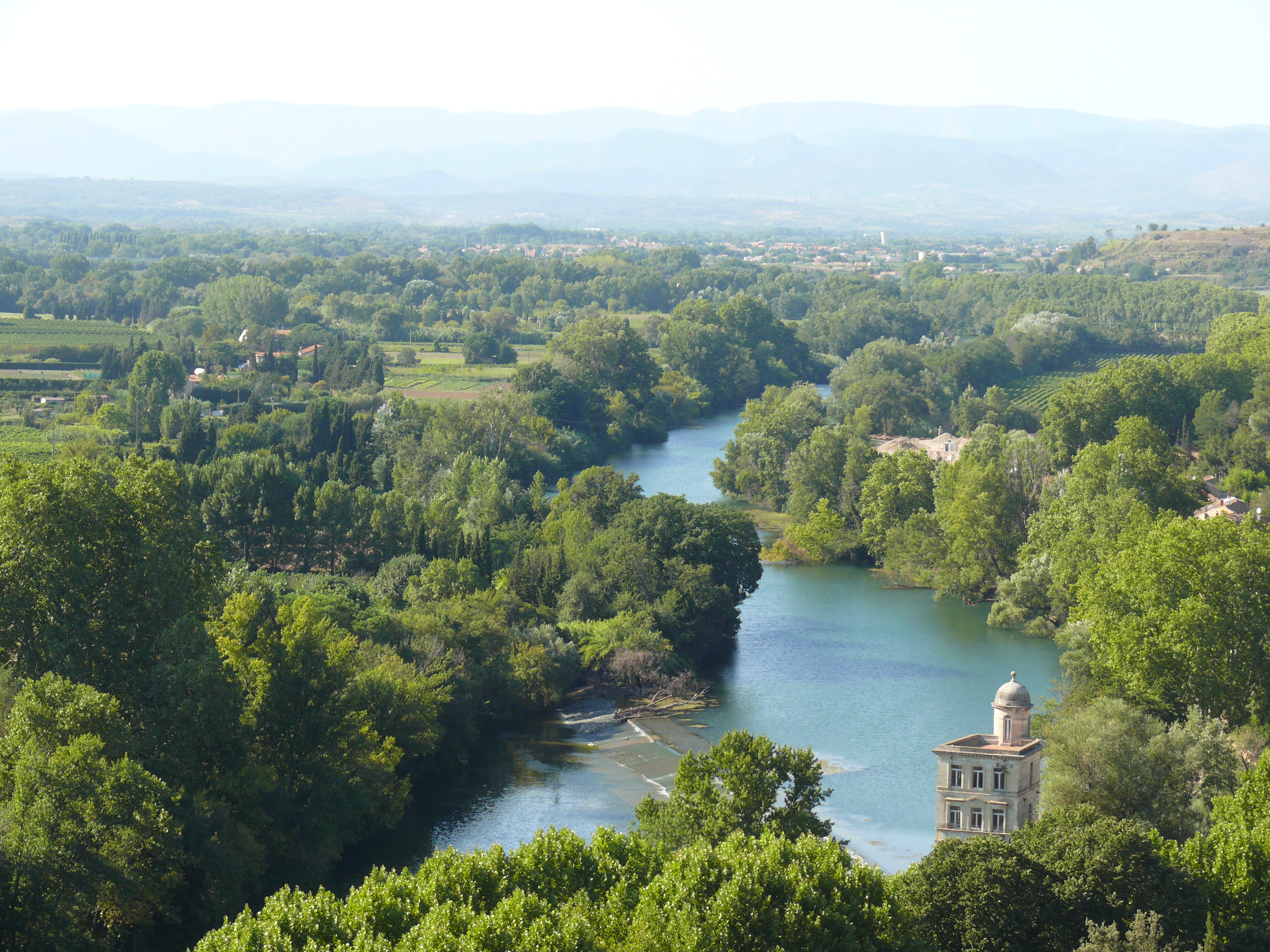
View from Béziers to the river Orb showing a weir and the Ancien Moulin de Bagnols

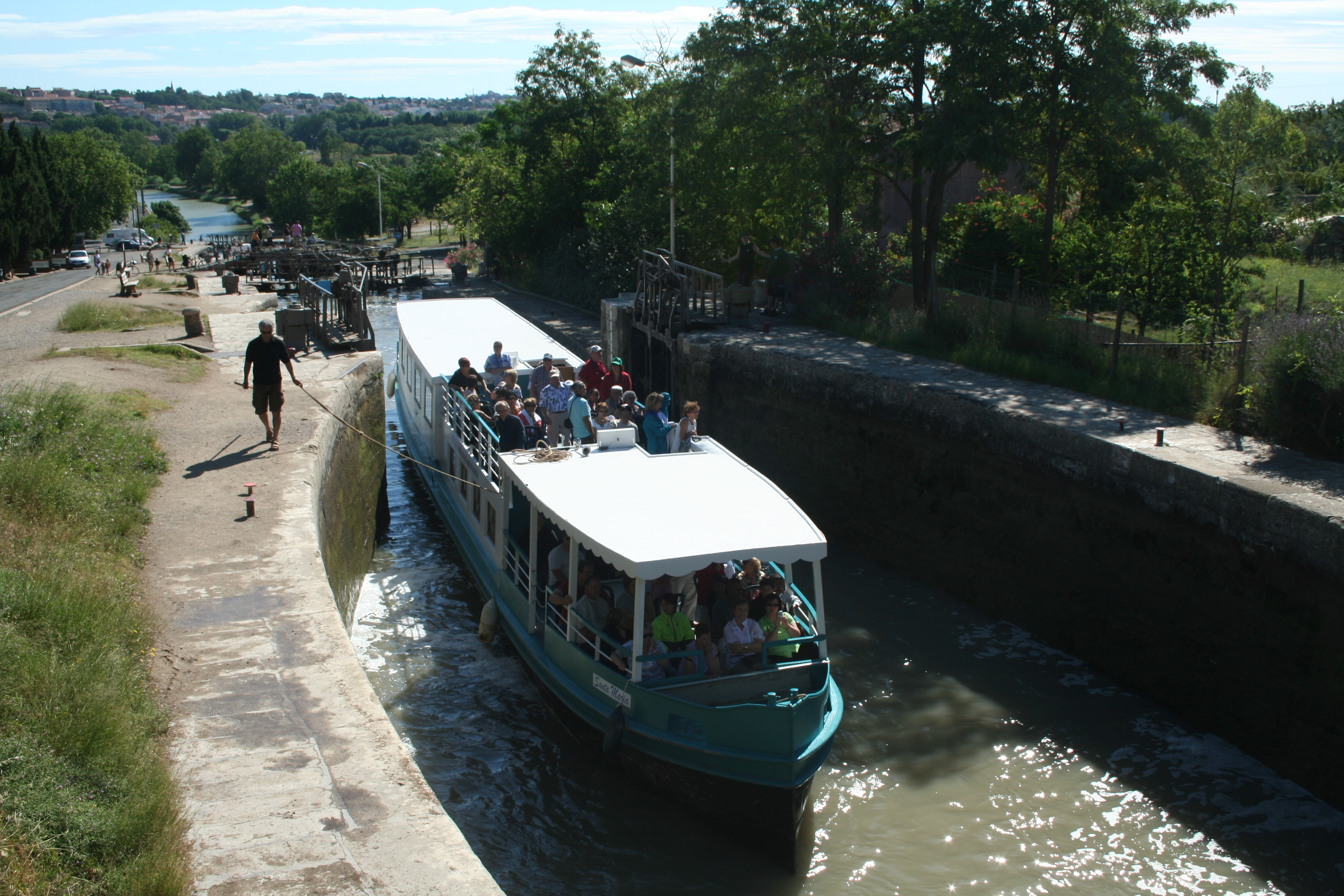
Fonserannes Locks on the Canal du Midi

== See also ==
- Guillaume Bottazzi, painter of a mural, Les Muriers Blancs, on eight façades of two buildings in Béziers
- Communes of the Hérault department
- Occitania
- Septimania
