= Anne Brenon =

French curator and historian

Annie Brenon, known as Anne Brenon (born 14 November 1945) is a French writer and historian, specialising in Catharism. She is the founder of Heresis, a review on Catharism and other medieval heresies and from 1982 to 1998 was director of the Centre national d'études cathares René-Nelli in Carcassonne.

== Life ==
Born in Mâcon, she gained a diploma as an archiviste paléographe at the École nationale des chartes with a thesis entitled "Les livres des Vaudois". She also received a diploma in religious sciences at the École pratique des hautes études and teaches medieval history at Montpellier University. She is a member of the Société des historiens médiévistes and an officer of the Palmes académiques.

== Works ==
She is the author of several works on Catharism, both non-fiction and novels.

- Le Vrai Visage du catharisme, Nouvelles Éditions Loubatières, 1990 – prix Notre Histoire
- Le Petit Livre aventureux des prénoms occitans au temps du catharisme, Loubatières, 1992
- Montségur (1244–1994) : mémoire d'hérétique, Loubatières, 1994
- Le Christianisme des bons hommes : message des cathares pour aujourd'hui, Éditions Le Foyer de l'âme, 1995 (with Pierre-Jean Ruff)
- Petit précis de catharisme, Éd. Loubatières, 1996
- Les Cathares : Pauvres du Christ ou apôtres de Satan ?, Éditions Gallimard, coll. « Découvertes Gallimard / Religions » (no. 319), 1997; 2000
- Les Archipels cathares : dissidence chrétienne dans l’Europe médiévale, Cahors, Dire Édition, 1997. Reissued 2003 by l’Hydre Éditions
- Les Cathares : une Église chrétienne au bûcher, Toulouse, Éditions Milan, Les Essentiels series, 1998
- La Croisade albigeoise, Toulouse, Le Pérégrinateur, 1998.
- Jordane, petite fille cathare de Fanjeaux, Toulouse, Loubatières, 1999 (children's novel)
- Le Dico des Cathares, Milan, les dicos essentiels Milan series, 2000
- L'Impénitente, L'hiver du catharisme, volume 1, L'Hydre, 2001 (novel)
- Joan, petit berger de Montaillou, MSM, 2002 (children's novel)
- Les Fils du malheur, L'hiver du catharisme, volume 2, L'Hydre, 2002 (novel)
- Les Femmes cathares, Éditions Perrin, Tempus series, 2005
- Pèire Autier (1245–1310), le dernier des cathares, Éd. Perrin, 2006
- Le Choix hérétique, La Louve Éditions, 2006
- Les Cathares, Éditions Albin Michel, Spiritualités vivantes series, 2007
- Cathares : la contre-enquête (with Jean-Philippe de Tonnac), Albin Michel, 2008
- Les Mots du catharisme, 2010
- Petite histoire des cathares, 2018
