= Comparison of Catharism and Protestantism =

Analytical comparison of a proto-Protestant group to Protestants

The Cathars or Albigenses have been identified as Proto-Protestants by people such as Jean Duvernoy and John Foxe among others. The debate over the relationship between the Albigenses and Protestants has been a matter of theological interest and controversy in history. The comparison of Protestantism and Albigensianism was mainly important among French Protestants while German Protestants rarely discussed the Cathars. Affiliations with Catharism and Protestantism have been criticized by many historians, and those arguing for an affiliation between Protestants and Cathars have historically relied upon the presupposition that Cathar theology has been misinterpreted by the medieval Catholic church.

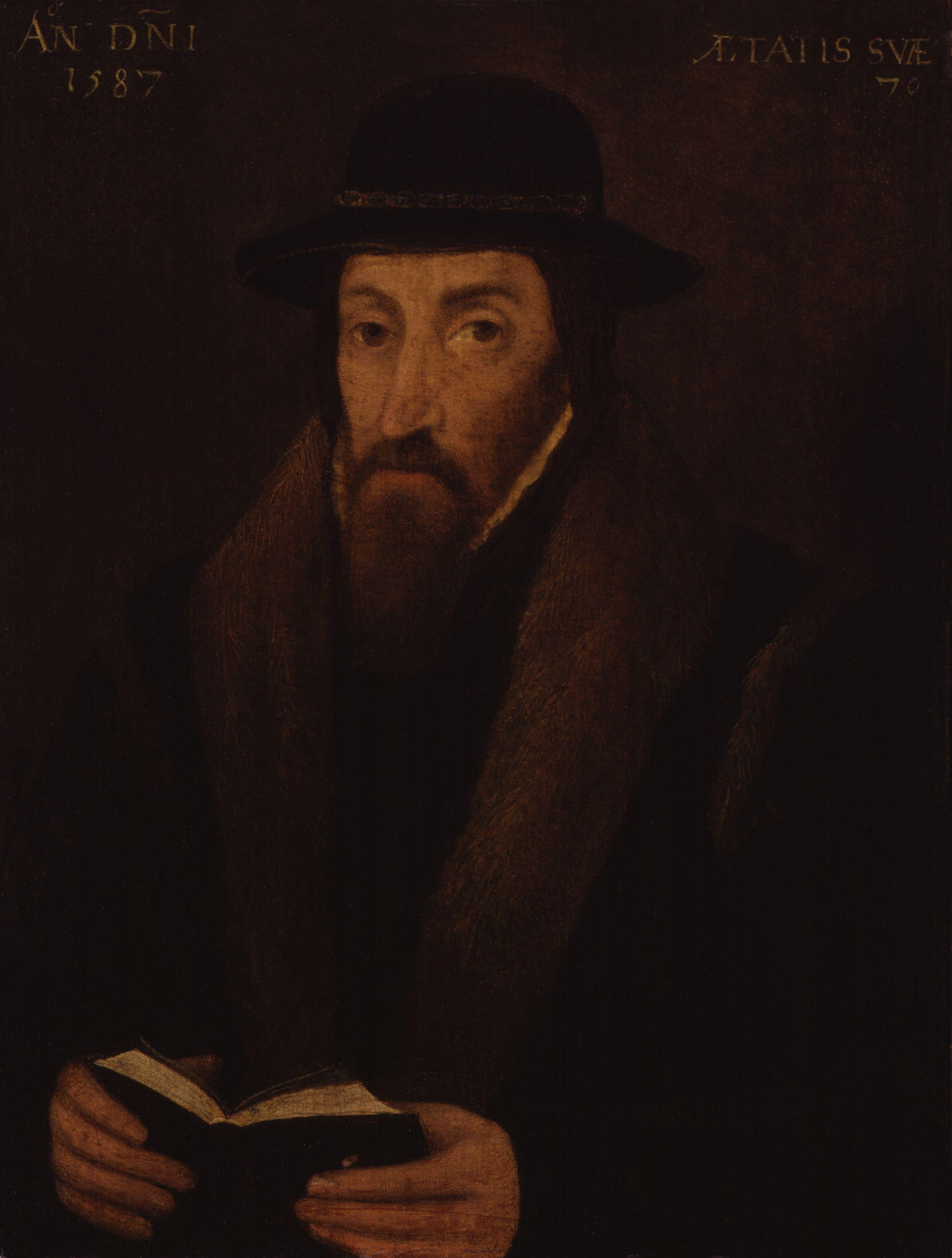
John Foxe believed the Cathars to be precursors of the Reformation.

John Foxe believed that the Albigenses were similar to reformed theology; he praised the Albigenses as martyrs. Today, the Cathars are still seen as Protestant precursors by some Baptists, particularly those who adhere to the theory of Baptist successionism.

== Points of Comparison ==
What has appealed to some Protestants about the Albigenses was their rejection of transubstantiation, purgatory, crucifix, prayers for the dead, the invocation of saints and also that the Cathars held to the unique authority of scripture. Cathars also read the Bible in the vernacular languages and rejected most Catholic sacraments. The Cathars also denied infant baptism, as they felt that infants are not able to understand the meaning of baptism.

The Reformation also spread successfully in areas previously inhabited by Cathars; as an example Protestantism was successful in Toulouse, which was also a stronghold of Albigensianism. Jean Carbonnier used this as evidence of Cathars holding reformation ideas; he argued that "people living in Cévennes have held reformation views for several centuries".

Some have also attempted to link the Petrobrusians, who some see as Protestant forerunners and Cathars, due to both groups sharing iconoclasm, credobaptism and the denial of transubstantiation, however such views have been criticized by many historians.

== Dualism ==
Protestants who have attempted to claim Cathars as their precursors have historically denied any charges of dualism on the Cathars as simply hostile claims. The Cathar views on dualism were against both Roman Catholic and Protestant teachings. Protestant historians such as Jacques Basnage, Mosheim and Shroeck have insisted that the charges of dualism and docetism were not authentic, only hostile claims, with such arguments being criticized by Charles Schmidt.

These historians argued that there were possibly other neo-Manichean dualists in the Middle Ages, but they were not Cathars, and that that the identification with dualism was a misinterpretation of Cathar theology because the Cathars denied religious hierarchy set by man. However each argument has been called "unconvincing" by critics of the theory.

== See also ==
- Proto-Protestantism
- Pseudo-Gnosticism
- Foxe's Book of Martyrs
