= Song of the Albigensian Crusade =

1213 epic poem by William of Tudela

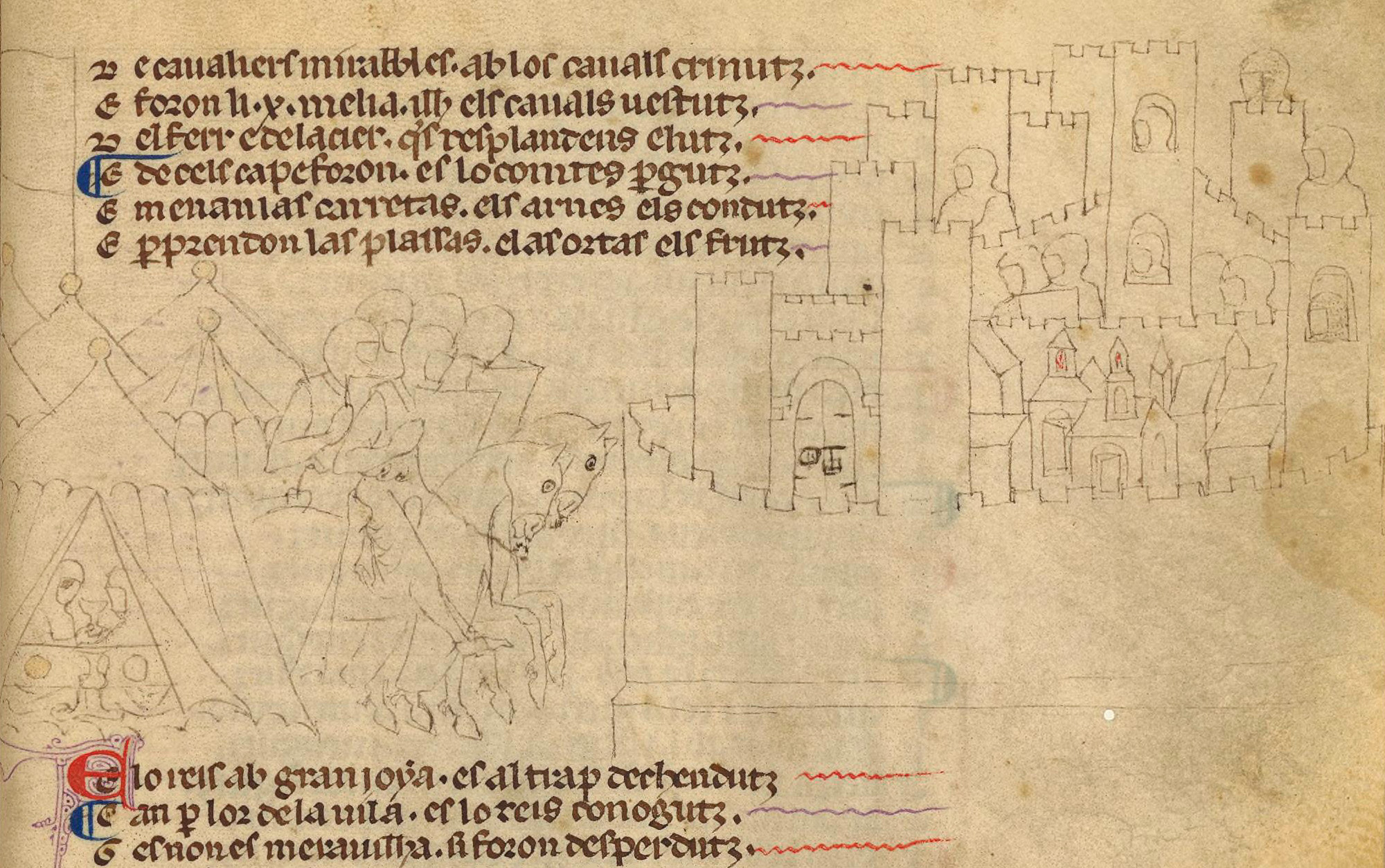
Louis VIII of France capturing Marmande, from the sole surviving manuscript of the Song of the Albigensian Crusade

The Song of the Albigensian Crusade is an Old Occitan epic poem narrating events of the Albigensian Crusade from March 1208 to June 1219. Modelled on the Old French chanson de geste, it was composed in two distinct parts: William of Tudela wrote the first towards 1213, and an anonymous continuator finished the account. However, recent studies have proposed the troubadour Gui de Cavalhon as the author of the second part. It is one of three major contemporary narratives of the Albigensian Crusade, the Historia Albigensis of Pierre des Vaux-de-Cernay and the Chronica of William of Puylaurens being the others.

There is a single surviving manuscript of the whole Song (fr. 25425 in the Bibliothèque nationale), written in or around Toulouse about 1275.

== Contents ==
=== First part ===
The first was written by William of Tudela (he names himself as "maestre W." in laisses 1 and 9). The author also names the date of the beginning of the composition, as 1210 (laisse 9). It comprises the first 2749 lines, in 130 laisses (rhymed stanzas of varying length), and takes the story to the beginning of 1213.

It is strongly partisan, in favour of the Crusaders and against their opponents, the Cathars and southerners in general. The text has the earliest use of the term crusade (as crozada).

=== Second part ===
The second part comprises the remaining 6811 lines of the poem, in laisses 131 to 214. The author's identity is not certain, although the name of Gui de Cavalhon has been recently proposed. This second part covers events from 1213 onwards and takes the opposite point of view, critical of the Crusaders and strongly in favour of the southerners (though not of Catharism). To historians the Song is important for this whole period because it is the only major narrative source that takes the southern viewpoint; it is especially important from April 1216 to June 1219, because the prose narrative by Pierre des Vaux-de-Cernay becomes more sketchy and incomplete from 1216 onwards.

The author was apparently an educated man, displaying some knowledge of theology and law, and belonged to the diocese of Toulouse (since he calls bishop Folquet de Marselha "our bishop"). Michel Zink suggests that he was with Raymond VII of Toulouse in Rome and Provence during the years 1215 and 1216. The poet mentions the death of Guy of Montfort, which actually took place in 1228; it is questionable whether the whole of part 2 was written after that date, or whether the reference to Guy's death was a later insertion. Saverio Guida has proposed that Gui de Cavalhon may be the author. Gui, besides being a troubadour, was also a noble, and one of the most faithful allies of Raymond VI of Toulouse.

== Editions and translations ==
The text was first edited by Claude Charles Fauriel in 1837. The first critical edition was published with a French translation, as Chanson de la croisade contre les albigeois, by Paul Meyer in two volumes (1875–1879). Eugène Martin-Chabot published another multi-volume edition and French translation under the title Chanson de la croisade albigeoise (1931–1961). Gougaud (1992) published a new single-volume French translation. An English translation was published by Shirley (1996).
