= Siege of Toulouse (1217–1218) =

Siege of the Albigensian Crusade in France

Coordinates: 43.6053°N 1.4428°E

- Part of the Albigensian Crusade
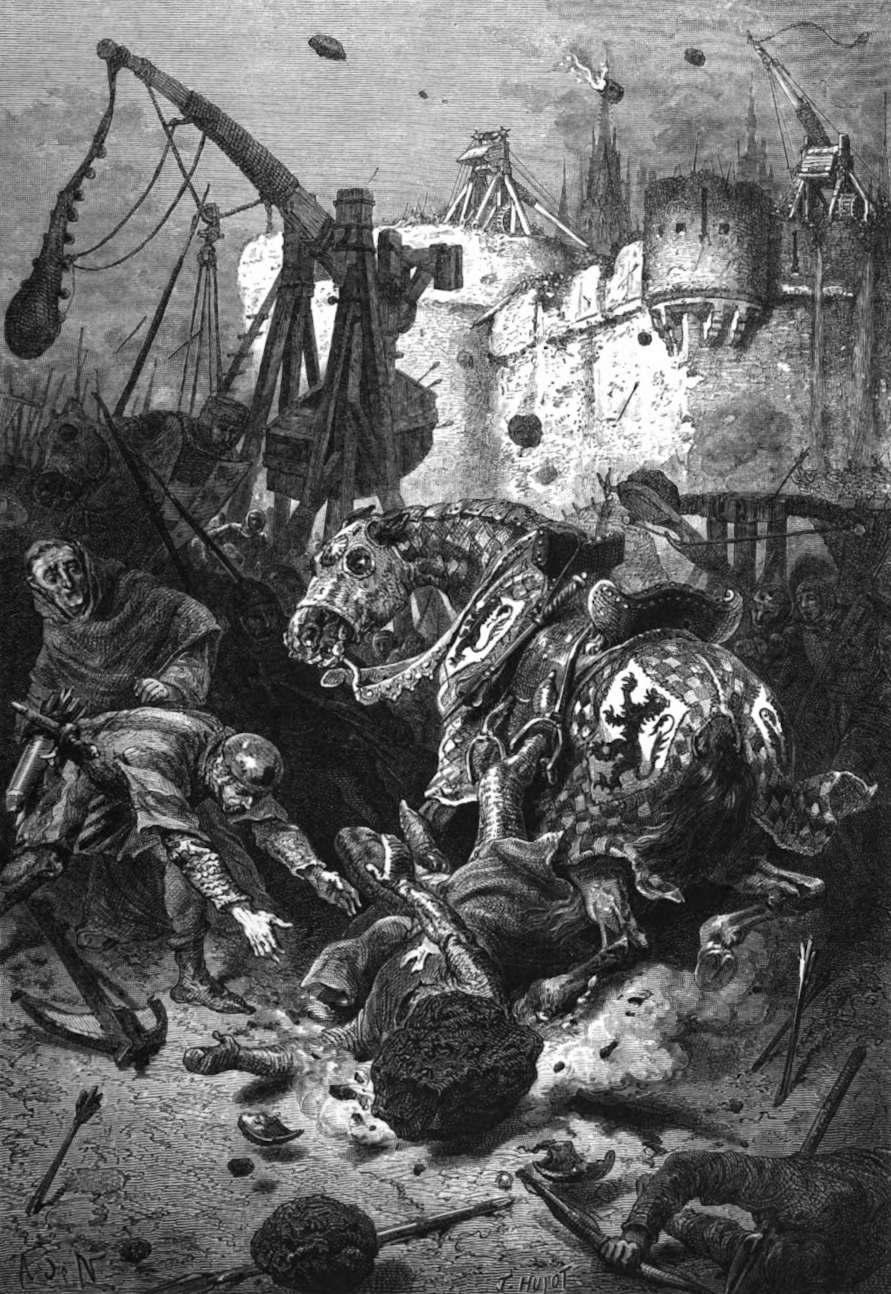
- Depiction of Simon de Montfort's death at Toulouse
Date	22 September 1217 – 25 July 1218
Location	Toulouse, County of Toulouse
Result	Toulouse victory

Belligerents
Crusaders	County of Toulouse

Commanders and leaders
Simon de Montfort †; Amaury de Montfort	Raymond de Toulouse

Toulouse was besieged from 22 September 1217 to 25 July 1218 during the Albigensian Crusade. It was the third of a series of sieges of the city during the height of Crusader efforts to put down Catharism (and the local Languedocian nobility). It ended in the repulsion of the Crusaders and the death of their leader, Simon IV de Montfort.

== Background ==
In 1211, Simon IV de Montfort conducted his first siege of Toulouse, one that featured no siege engines and is widely considered a tactical blunder and was ultimately unsuccessful. Two years later at the Battle of Muret much of Toulouse's military forces were defeated along with its Count Raymond VI, Count of Toulouse. Though Simon was practically the Count of Toulouse by 1214, it was not until Pope Innocent III's decision following the Fourth Council of the Lateran in November 1215 that it was made official. Simultaneously Raymond VI and his son, Raymond VII, began to plot a double pronged invasion into Languedoc to take their territories back.

While Raymond the Elder went to Spain to raise an army and attack Simon from the rear, his son went to the Rhône valley and laid siege to Beaucaire in May 1216. The citizens of Beaucaire had been forewarned of Raymond VII's return and threw the gates open to welcome him into the city and fight the unprepared crusader garrison. Ultimately, the besieged crusaders held out in a castle outside the city walls for four months. By the time Simon arrived to help them, the garrison had been forced to eat their own horses. Raymond the Younger had taken Beaucaire and garrisoned its walls, while also keeping the castle that the former garrison lay in under tight guard. Simon and his crusader forces made numerous attempts to besiege the city and make contact with their fellow men in the castle, all to no avail. Finally, on August 24, 1216, Simon was forced to accept terms, and that he had suffered his first major loss of the Albigensian Crusade, and to a young, unseasoned commander nonetheless.

Immediately following this loss, Simon was informed that the citizens of Toulouse had begun plotting with Raymond the Elder, and he raced back to the city. By this time, Simon owed his troops their wages and decided he would make Toulouse pay them. Upon his return, he threw a delegation of the distinguished citizens into the Château Narbonnais and had them held under guard. At Simon's bidding, "armed bands of crusaders passed through the streets breaking into aristocratic houses, carrying off coins and jewelry". Aside from a brief interlude in Gascony to marry his son Guy to the Countess of Bigorre, Montfort stayed in Toulouse until around Christmas before leaving to campaign against the Count of Foix.

== Siege ==
On 13 September 1217, the rival claimant, Raymond VI, entered and retook the city without a fight. Simon returned in haste to besiege the city once more, arrving in early October. Despite him having ordered the city's defenses dismantled while he was in control, he found its defenses intact and its walls well-manned. In anticipation of the siege, Marvin writes that "the people enthusiastically built barricades, dug ditches, and re-built walls, towers, barbicans etc.". His forces were too small to surround it, and the siege dragged on through the winter months with little activity.

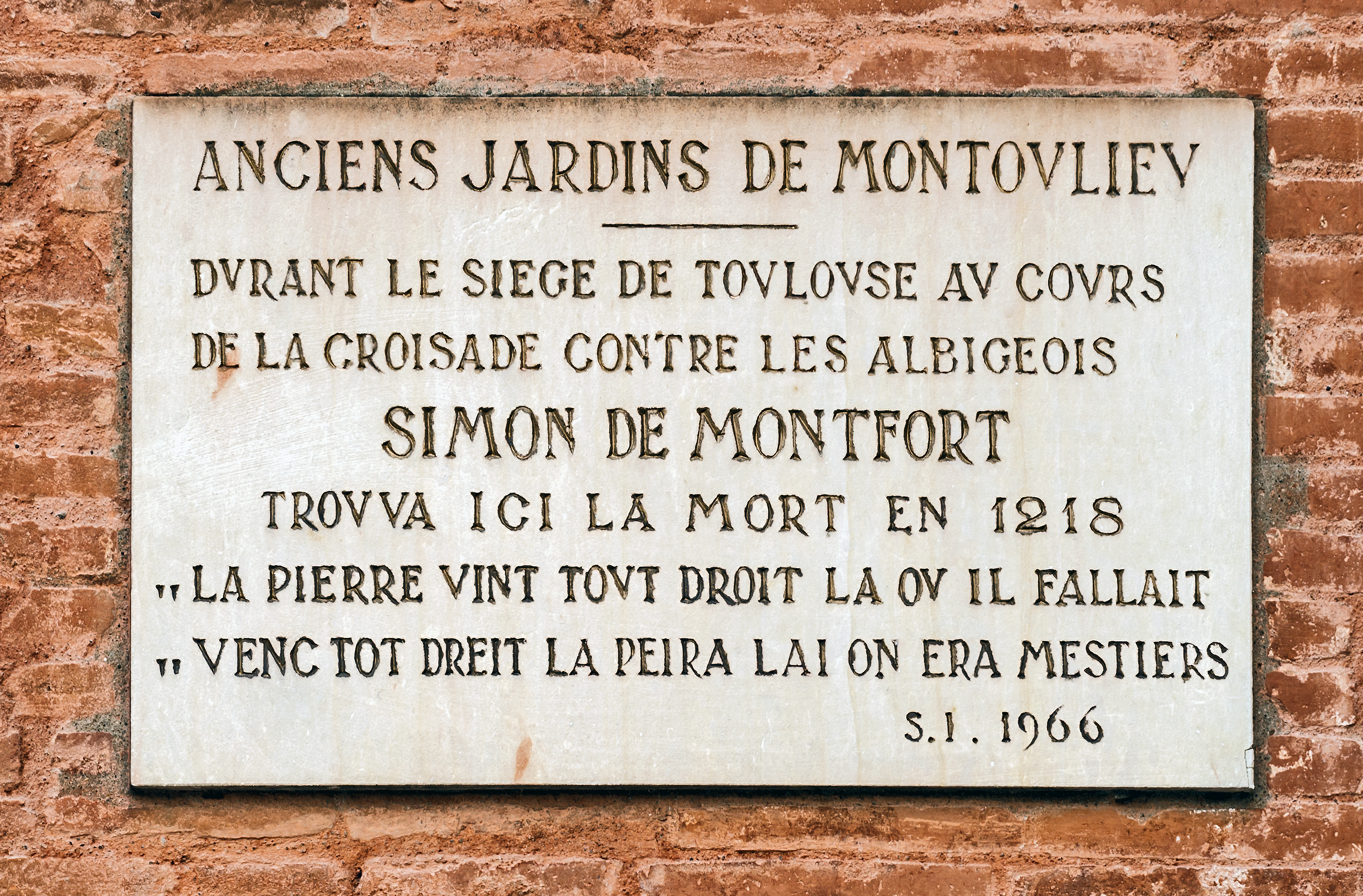
Plaque commemorating the death of Simon de Montfort

In the spring of 1218, the people of Toulouse built more catapults, mangonels, and a trebuchet. Meanwhile, on 3 June, the Crusaders constructed (or had brought in) a "cat" (a leather-covered, steeply gabled mobile shelter) in order to approach the walls. The defenders' trebuchet swiftly dispatched it, and on 25 June, they sortied to burn the cat, which they did. During the Crusaders' counter-assault, Simon stopped to aid his brother Guy, who had been wounded by a crossbow, and was hit on the head by a stone from one of the defenders' siege engines (either the trebuchet or a mangonel), apparently operated by donas e tozas e mulhers (ladies, girls, and women). It killed him. The leadership of the Crusade fell to his son Amaury, but the siege was lifted a month later.

The events of the siege prompted the resident troubadour (and possibly priest) Raimon Escrivan to compose a song, Senhors, l'autrier vi ses falhida, on it. The song, a tenso, presents a mock debate between two siege machines (the trebuchet and the cat) in which the trebuchet wins.

== Sources ==
- Guillaume de Puylaurens. The Siege of Toulouse in 1217–18. Cronica.
- Riquer, Martín de. Los trovadores: historia literaria y textos. 3 vol. Barcelona: Planeta, 1975.
