= Raimon Escrivan =

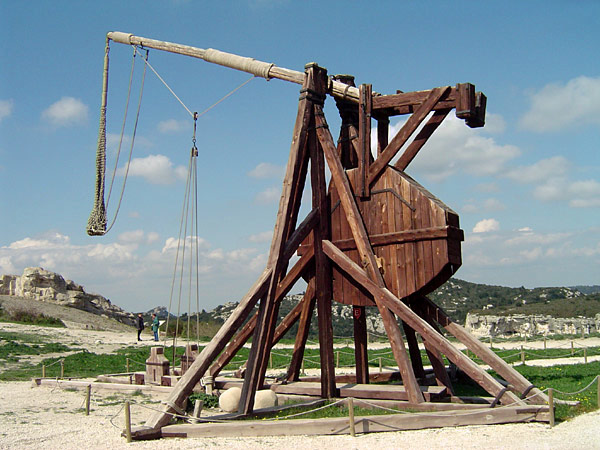
A counterweight trebuchet: probably the kind used by Toulouse in 1218

Raimon Escrivan was a Toulousain troubadour. He may be identified with the canon Raimundus Scriptor of Saint-Étienne in Toulouse or perhaps Raimon de Costiran, a victim of the Papal Inquisition at Avinhonet in 1242. His surname, Escrivan, means "writer" (Latin scriptor) and was commonly adopted by notaries at that time.

While trapped in the city during the Siege of Toulouse in 1218, he wrote a mock tenso between a trebuchet (trabuquet) and a siege engine called a "cat" (cata). Senhors, l'autrier vi ses falhida, as it begins, has been interpreted as cleverly disguised obscenity, but there is no reason not to take it at face value. During the siege a trebuchet was constructed by the citizens and successfully employed to destroy the besiegers' cat, just as the trabuquet of the poem defeats the cata. The Chanson de la Croisade Albigeoise contains a description of the siege (from a Toulousain viewpoint) which echoes the tenor of Escrivan's song.

== Sources ==
- Riquer, Martín de. Los trovadores: historia literaria y textos. 3 vol. Barcelona: Planeta, 1975.
