= Raymond du Fauga =

French Dominican and bishop

Raymond du Fauga (Note: Raimond du Falga, Raymond de Falgar, Raimond de Falgar, Raimon de Fauga, Raymond de Fauga, Raimond de Felgar, Raymond de Felgar, Raimundus de Felgar, Raimondo di Falgario, Raymundus de Falgario.) was a French Dominican, and bishop of Toulouse from 1232 to 1270. He was a significant figure in the struggle in Languedoc between the Catholic Church and the Cathars.

Contemporary chroniclers give accounts of events in Toulouse of this period. Guillaume de Puylaurens was close to Raymond and acted as his notary. Guillaume Pelhisson was a Dominican eye-witness, present in 1235.

== Early life ==
He was from Miremont, a son of a noted family, born at the château de Miremont around 1200. He was prior of the Dominican house at Montpellier, and then the fourth Provincial of the Dominicans of Provence.

== Bishop against the Cathars ==
In 1232 he and Raymond VII of Toulouse captured 19 Cathars including Pagan de la Bessède; they were all burned. In 1233 Bishop Raymond had papal bidding to punish the Lords of Niort, who were scoffing at Catholic power in the region. Count Raymond became less enthusiastic for the repression, but Bishop Raymond persuaded him to enact anti-heresy legislation in 1234.

The Inquisition was established in Languedoc in 1233, with an Inquisitor for Toulouse appointed early in that year; Dominicans were tasked with the work. In August 1235 an incident that has become a representative anecdote of Bishop Raymond took place: the entrapping, related in the chronicle of Pelhisson, of a seriously ill Cathar woman.

On the basis of his record, Oldebourg concludes that Raymond was a “fanatic”. Later in 1235 the Dominicans were required to leave Count Raymond's territories, the Bishop with them, and he left Toulouse in the midst of popular unrest. The Dominicans withdrew to Carcassonne. Bishop Raymond went to Rome, to appeal to Pope Gregory IX for help; the Pope wrote putting pressure on Count Raymond, and the Dominicans negotiated a return to Toulouse in 1236.

== Later life ==
The rest of his long period as bishop was marked by a conflict with his metropolitan, Maurin (Mauris), archbishop of Narbonne. This blew up in the 1260s, and resulted in an outside enquiry into Raymond's conduct. Under heavy suspicion in the years 1262–4, Raymond appealed to Pope Clement IV and survived in place.
