= Chronica (Guillaume de Puylaurens) =

History of Catharism by Guillaume de Puylaurens

Cronica (in standard Latin, Chronica; in English, "Chronicle") is the short title of a history of Catharism and the Albigensian Crusade by the 13th century Toulousain author Guillaume de Puylaurens.

The most important manuscript of the Chronica (Paris Bibl. Nat. Latin 5212) dates from the early 14th century. It was probably written in or near Toulouse and perhaps belonged to a Dominican foundation such as Prouille. Two further manuscripts are later copies of this one. A fourth (Paris Bibl. Nat. Latin 5213) is of the 16th century but based on an early manuscript now lost. The 1623 edition by Guillaume Catel (see below) was based on other manuscripts now lost.

The oldest manuscript provides two possible longer titles for the work. The incipit is Incipit chronica a magistro Guillelmo de Podio Laurenti compilata, "here begins the chronicle compiled by Master William of Puylaurens". The prologue is headed Incipit prologus super hystoria negocii a Francis Albiensis vulgariter appellati, "here begins the prologue of the history of what the French call the Albigensian affair".

The chronicle opens with the preaching of Bernard of Clairvaux against the heretics of Verfeil, Haute-Garonne in 1145 and closes with the restitution, on 15 March 1275, of the confiscated lands of Roger-Bernard III of Foix. Work on the chronicle was completed before 25 July 1276, date of the death of James I of Aragon, who is spoken of in the final sentence as still alive.

In the 14th century the Chronica was used by the Dominican historian Bernard Gui, who included long excerpts from it in his Flores chronicorum. An anonymous abbreviation of this latter work was made in the late 15th century under the title Praeclara Francorum facinora; as a popular history this appeared in several undated editions during the first few decades after the spread of printing.

== See also ==
- Peter of les Vaux de Cernay (author of Historia albigensis, another major source text)

== Editions and translations ==
- Guillaume Catel, Histoire des comtes de Toulouse. Toulouse, 1623. Text.
- Duvernoy, Jean, ed. (1996) [1976], "Chronica magistri Guillelmi de Podio Laurentii", Guillaume de Puylaurens, Chronique 1145-1275, Paris and Toulouse: CNRS and Le Pérégrinateur, ISBN 2-910352-06-4, "Latin text and French translation"
- Silby, W.A. and M.D. Silby, trans. (2003), The Chronicle of William of Puylaurens: The Albigensian Crusade and its Aftermath. Woodbridge: Boydell Press, ISBN 9780851159256. [English translation]
