= Albanenses =

The Albanenses were a Cathar sect in Italy in the 12th and 13th centuries. They were absolute dualists and their headquarters was in Desenzano. The other sects were the moderate dualist Concorezzenses and an intermediate group called Bagnolenses. According to Reinerius Saccho, writing in 1250, all the Cathar sects recognized each other in spite of their differences except the Albanenses and Concorezzenses, who condemn each other. The Albanenses were the followers of papa Niketas and the ordo of Drugunthia.

== Bibliography ==
- Hamilton, Bernard (2004). "Introduction". In Janet Hamilton (ed.). Hugh Eteriano: Contra Patarenos. Brill. pp. 1–102.
- Roach, Andrew (1989). The Relationship of the Italian and Southern French Cathars, 1170–1320 (D.Phil. diss.). University of Oxford.
