= Guillaume de Puylaurens =

13th century French writer and historian

Guillaume de Puylaurens (in Occitan, Guilhèm de Puèglaurenç; in Latin, Guillelmus de Podio Laurenti; in English, William of Puylaurens) is a 13th-century Latin chronicler, author of a history of Catharism and of the Albigensian Crusade.

He was born soon after 1200 at Toulouse, where he perhaps studied at the nascent university and gained the title of "Master". He worked with bishop Foulques around 1228 to 1230. He was curé at Puylaurens (Tarn) from 1237 to 1240 (whence his name) and during this period was close to Foulques' successor as bishop, Raimond du Fauga. From 1244 onwards he was chaplain to Raymond VII of Toulouse and was present at Raymond's death on September 27, 1249. He lived until 1274 at least, occasionally working for the Inquisition.

His work is entitled simply Cronica (in English, "Chronicle").

== Bibliography ==
- Puylaurens, Guillaume de (1976). Duvernoy, Jean (ed.). Guillaume de Puylaurens, Chronique 1145–1275: Chronica magistri Guillelmi de Podio Laurentii. Paris: CNRS. ISBN 2-910352-06-4.
- Sibly, W.A., and Sibly, M.D., translators, The Chronicle of William of Puylaurens, The Albigensian Crusade and its Aftermath, Boydell Press, 2003, ISBN 0 85115 925 7
