= Mark Gregory Pegg =

Australian professor of medieval history

Mark Gregory Pegg (born 1963) is an Australian professor of medieval history, currently teaching in the United States at Washington University in St. Louis, Missouri. His scholarship focuses upon heresy, the inquisition, the Albigensian Crusade, and the history of holiness. Apart from these specific scholarly pursuits, he writes more broadly about what shapes and defines the medieval West from 200AD to 1500.

He is the author of The Corruption of Angels: The Great Inquisition of 1245–1246, A Most Holy War: The Albigensian Crusade and the Battle for Christendom, and Beatrice's Last Smile: A New History of the Middle Ages.

== Biography ==
Pegg was born in 1963 in Port Macquarie, New South Wales, Australia, and grew up in Woy Woy. He received his bachelor's degree in 1987 from the University of Sydney. Between 1988 and 1990 he was research assistant to the anthropologist Mary Douglas in London. He received his master's degree (1993) and Ph.D. (1997) from Princeton University, where his dissertation advisor was William Chester Jordan. He was a Member of the Institute for Advanced Study in Princeton in 1997. He was a visiting assistant professor at Washington University in 1998 before being hired as a tenure-track assistant professor in 1999. He was promoted to associate professor in 2004 and full professor in 2009.

In 2005, he was awarded an Andrew W. Mellon New Directions Fellowship; in 2009–2010, he received the Supplemental Award to the New Directions Fellowship. In 2016-2017 he was a Fellow at the Collegium de Lyon: Institut d'études avancées, Université de Lyon, and in Spring 2022 he was a visiting professor at the Université de Montpellier III (Paul-Valéry).

== Works ==
Pegg publishes widely on the Crusades, heresy, the inquisition, and the Middle Ages generally. Selected works include:

Books

- The Corruption of Angels: The Great Inquisition of 1245–1246 (Princeton: Princeton University Press, 2001) ISBN 978-0691006567.
- A Most Holy War: The Albigensian Crusade and the Battle for Christendom (New York: Oxford University Press 2007) ISBN 978-0195171310.
- Beatrice's Last Smile: A New History of the Middle Ages (New York: Oxford University Press, 2023) ISBN 978-0199766482.

Articles

- "Le corps et l’autorité: la lèpre de Baudouin IV", Annales ESC, 45 (1990): 265–287.
- "On the Cathars, the Albigensians, and good men of Languedoc," Journal of Medieval History, 27 (2001):181–195.
- "The Paradigm of Catharism; or the Historians' Illusion," in Cathars in Question, ed. Antonio Sennis (Woodbridge: York Medieval Press—Boydell and Brewer, 2016), pp. 26–57.
- "Le catharisme en questions : falsifiabilité, vérité historique et une nouvelle histoire du christianisme médiéval," Cahiers de Fanjeaux : Le catharisme en question, 55 (2020): 331–369.
- "The Albigensian Crusade and the Early Inquisitions into Heretical Depravity, 1208-1246," in The Cambridge World History of Genocide, eds. Ben Kieran, T.M. Lemon, and Tristan Taylor (Cambridge: Cambridge University Press, 2022), 1, pp. 470–497.
