= Pseudo-Gnosticism =

Groups labeled "gnostic" that may not quite be gnostic

Pseudo-Gnosticism is a term used for groups which have been labelled Gnostic, either by their contemporaries or modern historians even when the accuracy of this label is questionable. Examples include some ancient groups like the Thomasines or the Bardaisanites, but more often refer to medieval sects accused of Gnosticism or rejection of established Catholic Church doctrine by other Christian authorities such as the Paulicians, Bosnian Church or according to some, the mainstream Cathars and Bogomils.

Similar accusations occurred during the Christianisation of Ireland and the Baltic Crusade, when the Roman Catholic Church would accuse these of worshipping gods from Roman Paganism.
