= Jean Duvernoy =

French historian (1917–2010)

Jean Duvernoy (1 January 1917 – 19 August 2010, Saint-Jean de Luz) was a French medievalist who specialized in the history of the Cathars. He was born in 1917 in Bourgoin to a Protestant family.

A doctor of law and a graduate in literature, he was elected maintainer of the Toulouse Floral Games Academy in 1989.

He began to study the Waldensians and later Catharism. He edited and translated to French a great number of sources originally written in Latin. These include Jacques Fournier's inquisition register, from which the French historian Emmanuel Le Roy Ladurie extracted Montaillou: The Promised Land of Error.

== Works ==
- Le Registre d'inquisition de Jacques Fournier, évêque de Pamiers, 1318-1325 : manuscrit Vat. latin n°4030 de la Bibliothèque vaticane, publié avec introduction et notes par Jean Duvernoy (3 volumes, 1965). Réédition : Tchou, Paris, 2004.
- Inquisition à Pamiers, interrogatoires de Jacques Fournier : 1318-1325, chosen, translated from Latin and présented by Jean Duvernoy, 1966
- Chronique, [1203-1275], by Guillaume de Puylaurens, text edited, translated and annotated by Jean Duvernoy, 1976
- La religion des cathares, 1976
- L'histoire des cathares, 1979
- Inquisition à Pamiers : cathares, juifs, lépreux, devant leurs juges, 1986
- Spirituels et béguins du Midi, by Raoul Manselli, translation Jean Duvernoy, 1989
- Cathares, vaudois et béguins : dissidents du pays d'Oc, 1994
- Chronique, 1229-1244 par Guillaume Pelhisson, text edited, translated and annotated by Jean Duvernoy, 1994
- Le Dossier de Montségur, interrogatoires d'inquisition, 1242-1247 translated, annotated and presentated by Jean Duvernoy, 1998
- Les cathares, Jean Duvernoy, 1998
- Le procès de Bernard Délicieux, 1319, translated, annotated and presentated by Jean Duvernoy, 2001
- L'Inquisition en Quercy : le registre des pénitences de Pierre Cellan, 1241-1242, prefaced, translated from Latin and annotated by Jean Duvernoy, 2001
