= Catharism =

Medieval southern European Christian dualist movement

- Type: Pseudo-Gnostic Christian movement or moral panic (disputed)
- Theology: Dualistic
- Associations: Christianity; Gnosticism (disputed)
- Origin: c. 1200s
- Branched from: Roman Catholicism
- Defunct: 14th century

Catharism (/ˈkæθərɪzəm/ KATH-ər-iz-əm; from the Ancient Greek: καθαροί, romanized: katharoí, "the pure ones") was a Christian quasi-dualist and pseudo-Gnostic movement in Occitania and Northern Italy between the 12th and 14th centuries.

Few Cathar texts survive, and much of the present-day understanding of Cathar theology and thought is derived from Catholic denunciations of the movement. According to these sources, Cathars believed that there were not one, but two Gods—the good God of Heaven and the evil god of this age; that the good God was the God of the New Testament faith and the creator of the spiritual realm. Cathars identified the evil god as Satan, the master of the physical world, who was the same as the God of the Old Testament. By reputation, Cathars believed that human souls were the sexless spirits of angels trapped in the material realm of the evil god. They thought these souls were destined to be reincarnated until they achieved salvation through the consolamentum, a form of baptism performed when death is imminent. At that moment, they believed they would return to the good God as "Cathar Perfect". Catharism was initially taught by ascetic leaders who set few guidelines, leading some Catharist practices and beliefs to vary by region and over time.

Denounced as a heretical sect by the Catholic Church, the alleged followers of Catharism were attacked first by the Albigensian Crusade and later by the Medieval Inquisition, which claimed to have eradicated them by 1350. Thousands of people were slaughtered, hanged, or burned at the stake.

The extent of Catharism—and even the existence of the sect—is contested in contemporary scholarship which, since the 2000s, sometimes questions the extent to which Catharism was an organised movement or whether the sect existed beyond a moral panic against an imagined enemy of the Church similar to later witch trials.

== Etymology ==
Though the term Cathar (/ˈkæθɑːr/) has been used for centuries to identify the movement; whether it identified itself with the name is debated. In Cathar texts, the terms Good Men (Bons Hommes), Good Women (Bonnes Femmes), or Good Christians (Bons Chrétiens) are the common terms of self-identification.

In the testimony of suspects who were put to the question by the Inquisition, the term Cathar was not used amongst the group of accused heretics themselves. The word Cathar (aka Gazarri) was coined by Catholic theologians and used exclusively by the inquisition or by authors otherwise identified with the Orthodox church—for example in the anonymous pamphlet of 1430, Errores Gazariorum (Errors of the Cathars). The full title of this treatise in English is, The errors of the Gazarri, or of those who travel riding a broom or a stick.

However, the presence of a variety of beliefs and spiritual practices in the French countryside of the 12th and 13th centuries that came to be seen as heterodox relative to the Church in Rome is not actually in question, as the primary documents of the period exhaustively demonstrate.

Several of these groups under other names, such as the Waldensians or Valdeis, bear a close similarity to the "creed" or matrix of beliefs and folk-traditions pieced together under the umbrella of the term Catharism. Whether they acted in defense of the doctrine or in defense of the human community who held these beliefs, the fact that many gave themselves up willingly to the flames when the option to recant was given to them in many or most cases is significant.

As the scholar Claire Taylor puts it, in arguing against Pegg and Moore, two scholars questioning whether or not the Cathars exist, this issue

matters at an ethical level, because by being cleverly iconoclastic and populist in suggesting that those using "Cathar" have made 2+2=5, Pegg and Moore make 2+2=3 by denying the existence of the persecuted group. The missing element is a dissident religious doctrine, for which historians using a fuller range of sources believe thousands of people were prepared to suffer extreme persecution and an agonising death.

Several times in history the term Cathar was used for different groups that were deemed heretics rather than a specific one. For example, Saint Augustine, writing in the fourth century, describes a group referred to as "Catharistas" (lit. 'purifiers'), who added the mixture of male and female sexual fluids to flour to create a "Sacrament" which they ate, in the belief that they were purifying the substance through eating it. John Damascene, writing in the 8th century AD, also records an earlier sect called the "Cathari", in his book On Heresies, taken from the epitome provided by Epiphanius of Salamis in his Panarion. He says of them: "They absolutely reject those who marry a second time, and reject the possibility of penance [that is, forgiveness of sins after baptism]". These are probably the same Cathari (actually Novations) who are mentioned in Canon 8 of the First Ecumenical Council of Nicaea in the year 325, which states, "[I]f those called Cathari come over [to the faith], let them first make profession that they are willing to communicate [share full communion] with the twice-married, and grant pardon to those who have lapsed". It is certain that these "Cathars" were not the same as the self-designated Perfecti of the Albigenses; the term instead reflects its historical use in orthodox circles to designate "heretics".

== Origins ==
Expansion of Bogomilism in medieval Europe

The origins of the Cathars' beliefs are unclear, but most historians of the 20th century concerned with the subject agreed they came from the East, from areas within the deteriorating Byzantine Empire, mostly by the trade routes, and spread from the First Bulgarian Empire to the Netherlands. The movement appears to have been greatly influenced by the Bogomils of the First Bulgarian Empire, and may have originated in the Byzantine Empire, namely through adherents of the Paulician movement in Armenia and eastern Anatolia who were resettled in Thrace (Philippopolis).

The name of Bulgarians (Bougres) was also applied to the Albigensians, and they maintained an association with the similar Christian movement of the Bogomils ("Friends of God") of Thrace. "That there was a substantial transmission of ritual and ideas from Bogomilism to Catharism is beyond reasonable doubt." Their doctrines have numerous resemblances to those of the Bogomils and the Paulicians, who influenced them, as well as the earlier Marcianists, who were found in the same areas as the Paulicians, the Manicheans and the Christian Gnostics of the first few centuries AD, although, as many scholars, most notably Mark Pegg, have pointed out, it would be erroneous to extrapolate direct, historical connections based on theoretical similarities perceived by modern scholars.

A map of the routes of the Cathar castles (red squares and lines) in the south of France around the turn of the 13th century

The writings of the Cathars were mostly destroyed because of the doctrine's threat perceived by the Papacy; thus, the historical record of the Cathars is derived primarily from their opponents. Cathar ideology continues to be debated, with commentators regularly accusing opposing perspectives of speculation, distortion and bias. Only a few texts of the Cathars remain, as preserved by their opponents (such as the Rituel Cathare de Lyon) which give a glimpse into the ideologies of their faith. One large text has survived, The Book of Two Principles (Liber de duobus principiis), which elaborates the principles of dualistic theology from the point of view of some Albanenses Cathars.

It is now generally agreed by most scholars that identifiable historical Catharism did not emerge until at least 1143, when the first confirmed report of a group espousing similar beliefs is reported being active at Cologne by the cleric Eberwin of Steinfeld. (Note: See especially Moore 1977, and the collection of essays edited by Frassetto 2006 for a consideration of the origins of the Cathars, and proof against identifying earlier heretics in the West, such as those identified in 1025 at Monforte, outside Milan, as being Cathars. Also see Wakefield & Evans 1991) A landmark in the "institutional history" of the Cathars was the Council, held in 1167 at Saint-Félix-Lauragais, attended by many local figures and also by the Bogomil papa Nicetas, the Cathar bishop of (northern) France and a leader of the Cathars of Lombardy.

The Cathars were a largely local, Western European/Latin Christian phenomenon, springing up in the Rhineland cities, particularly Cologne, in the mid-12th century, northern France around the same time, and particularly the Languedoc—and the northern Italian cities in the mid-late 12th century. In the Languedoc and northern Italy, the Cathars attained their greatest popularity, surviving in the Languedoc, in much reduced form, up to around 1325 and in the Italian cities until the Inquisitions of the 14th century extirpated them.

== Beliefs ==
=== Cosmology ===
Gnostic cosmology identified two creator deities. The first was the creator of the heavens described in the New Testament, while the second was the demiurge depicted in the Old Testament (Hebrew Bible), who created the physical universe. The demiurge was often called Rex Mundi (lit. 'King [of the] World').

Some Gnostic belief systems, including Catharism, began to characterise the duality of creation as a relationship between hostile opposing forces of good and evil. Although the demiurge was sometimes conflated with Satan or considered Satan's father, creator, or seducer, these beliefs were far from unanimous. Some Cathar communities believed in a mitigated dualism similar to their Bogomil predecessors, stating that the evil God, Satan, had previously been the true God's servant before rebelling against him. Others, likely a majority over time given the influence reflected in the Book of the Two Principles, believed in an absolute dualism, wherein the two Gods were twin entities of the same power and importance.

All visible matter, including the human body, was created or crafted by this Rex Mundi; matter, therefore, was tainted with sin. In this view, humans were actually angels seduced by Satan before the War in Heaven against the army of the archangel Michael, after which they would have been forced to spend an eternity trapped in the evil God's material realm. The Cathars taught that, to regain angelic status, one had to renounce the material self completely. Until one was prepared to do so, they would be stuck in a cycle of reincarnation, condemned to suffer endless human lives on the corrupt Earth.

Zoé Oldenbourg compared the Cathars to "Western Buddhists", considering that their view of the doctrine of resurrection of Jesus was similar to the Buddhist doctrine of rebirth.

=== Christology ===
Cathars venerated Jesus and followed what they considered to be his true teachings, labelling themselves "Good Christians". However, they denied his physical incarnation and resurrection. Authors believe that their conception of Jesus resembled Docetism, believing him to be the human form of an angel whose physical presence was only an illusion. This illusory form would have possibly been given by the Virgin Mary, another angel in human form, or another virginal woman.

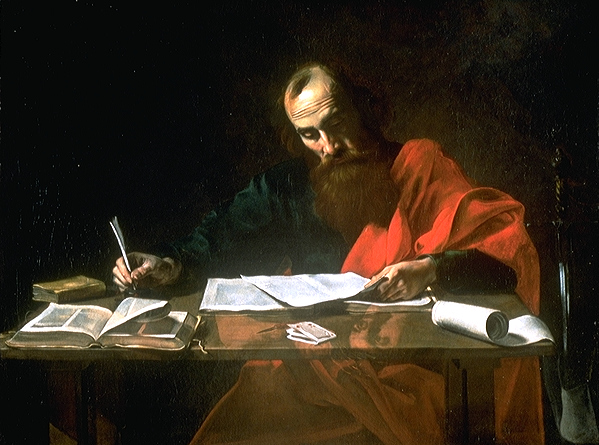
St. Paul, by Valentin de Boulogne.

They firmly rejected the resurrection of Jesus, seeing it as representing reincarnation, and the symbolism of the Christian cross, considering it to be no more than a material instrument of torture and evil. They also viewed John the Baptist, identified as the same entity as the prophet Elijah, as an evil being sent to hinder Jesus's teaching through the false sacrament of baptism. For the Cathars, the "resurrection" mentioned in the New Testament was only a symbol of reincarnation.

Most Cathars did not accept the normative trinitarian theology of Jesus, instead holding to nontrinitarian modalistic Monarchianism (Sabellianism) in the West and adoptionism in the East, which may or may not have been held alongside Docetism. Bernard of Clairvaux's biographer and other sources accuse some Cathars of Arianism, and some scholars see Cathar Christology as having traces of earlier Arian roots.

Some communities might have believed in the existence of a spirit realm created by the good God, the "Land of the Living", whose history and geography would have served as the basis for the evil god's corrupt creation. Under this view, the history of Jesus would have happened roughly as recounted in Christian texts—but only in the spirit realm. The physical Jesus from the material world would have been evil, a false messiah and a lustful lover of the material Mary Magdalene. However, the true Jesus would have influenced the physical world in a way similar to the Harrowing of Hell, only by inhabiting the body of Paul the Apostle. The 13th-century chronicler Pierre des Vaux-de-Cernay recorded those views.

=== Other beliefs ===
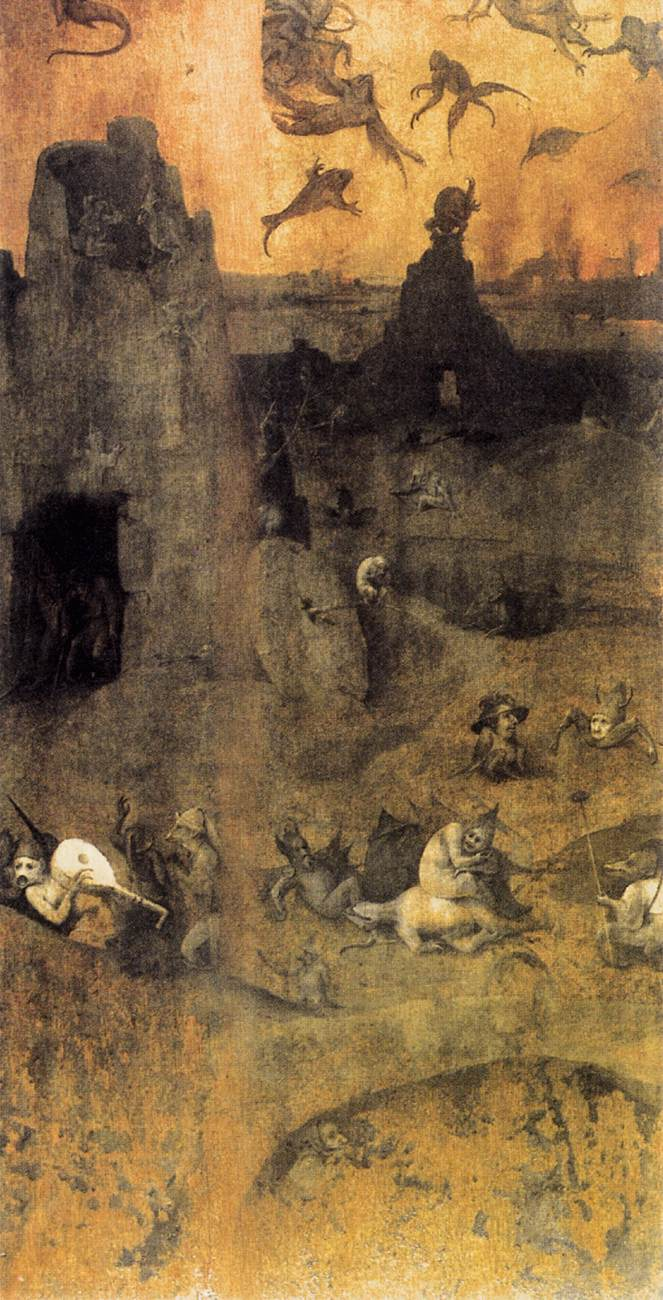
The Fall of the Rebel Angels by Hieronymus Bosch

Some Cathars told a version of the Enochian narrative, according to which Eve's daughters copulated with Satan's demons and bore giants. The Deluge would have been provoked by Satan, who disapproved of the demons revealing he was not the real god, or alternatively, an attempt by the Invisible Father to destroy the giants. The Holy Spirit was sometimes counted as one single entity, but to others it was considered the collective groups of unfallen angels who had not followed Satan in his rebellion.

Cathars believed that the sexual allure of women impeded a man's ability to reject the material world. Despite this stance on sex and reproduction, some Cathar communities made exceptions. In one version, the Invisible Father had two spiritual wives, Collam and Hoolibam (identified with Oholah and Oholibah), and would himself have provoked the war in Heaven by seducing the wife of Satan, or perhaps the reverse. Cathars adhering to this story would believe that having families and sons would not impede them from reaching God's kingdom.

Some communities also believed in a Day of Judgment that would come when the number of the just equalled that of angels who fell, when the believers would ascend to the heavens, while the sinners would be thrown into everlasting fire along with Satan.

The Cathars ate a pescatarian diet. They did not eat cheese, eggs, meat, or milk because these are all byproducts of sexual intercourse. The Cathars believed that animals were carriers of reincarnated souls, and forbade the killing of all animal life, apart from fish, which they believed were produced by spontaneous generation.

The Cathars could be seen as prefiguring Protestantism in that they denied transubstantiation, purgatory, prayers for the dead and prayers to saints. They also believed that the scriptures should be read in the vernacular.

=== Texts ===
The alleged sacred texts of the Cathars, besides the New Testament, included the Bogomil text Gospel of the Secret Supper (also called John's Interrogation), a modified version of Ascension of Isaiah, and the Cathar original work The Book of the Two Principles (possibly penned by Italian Cathar John Lugio of Bergamo). They regarded the Old Testament as written by Satan, except for a few books which they accepted, and considered the Book of Revelation not a prophecy about the future, but an allegorical chronicle of what had transpired in Satan's rebellion. Their reinterpretation of those texts contained numerous elements characteristic of Gnostic literature.

== Organization ==
=== Sacraments ===
Cathars, in general, formed an anti-sacerdotal party in opposition to the pre-Reformation Catholic Church, protesting against what they perceived to be the moral, spiritual and political corruption of the Church. In contrast, the Cathars had but one central rite, the Consolamentum, or Consolation. This involved a brief spiritual ceremony to remove all sin from the believer and to induct him into the next higher level as a Perfect.

Many believers would receive the Consolamentum as death drew near, performing the ritual of liberation at a moment when the heavy obligations of purity required of Perfecti would be temporally short. Some of those who received the sacrament of the consolamentum upon their death-beds may thereafter have refused further food and drink other than cold water until they died. This has been termed the endura. It was claimed by some of the church writers that when a Cathar, after receiving the Consolamentum, began to show signs of recovery he or she would be smothered in order to ensure his or her entry into paradise. Other than extreme cases, little evidence exists to suggest this was a common Cathar practice.

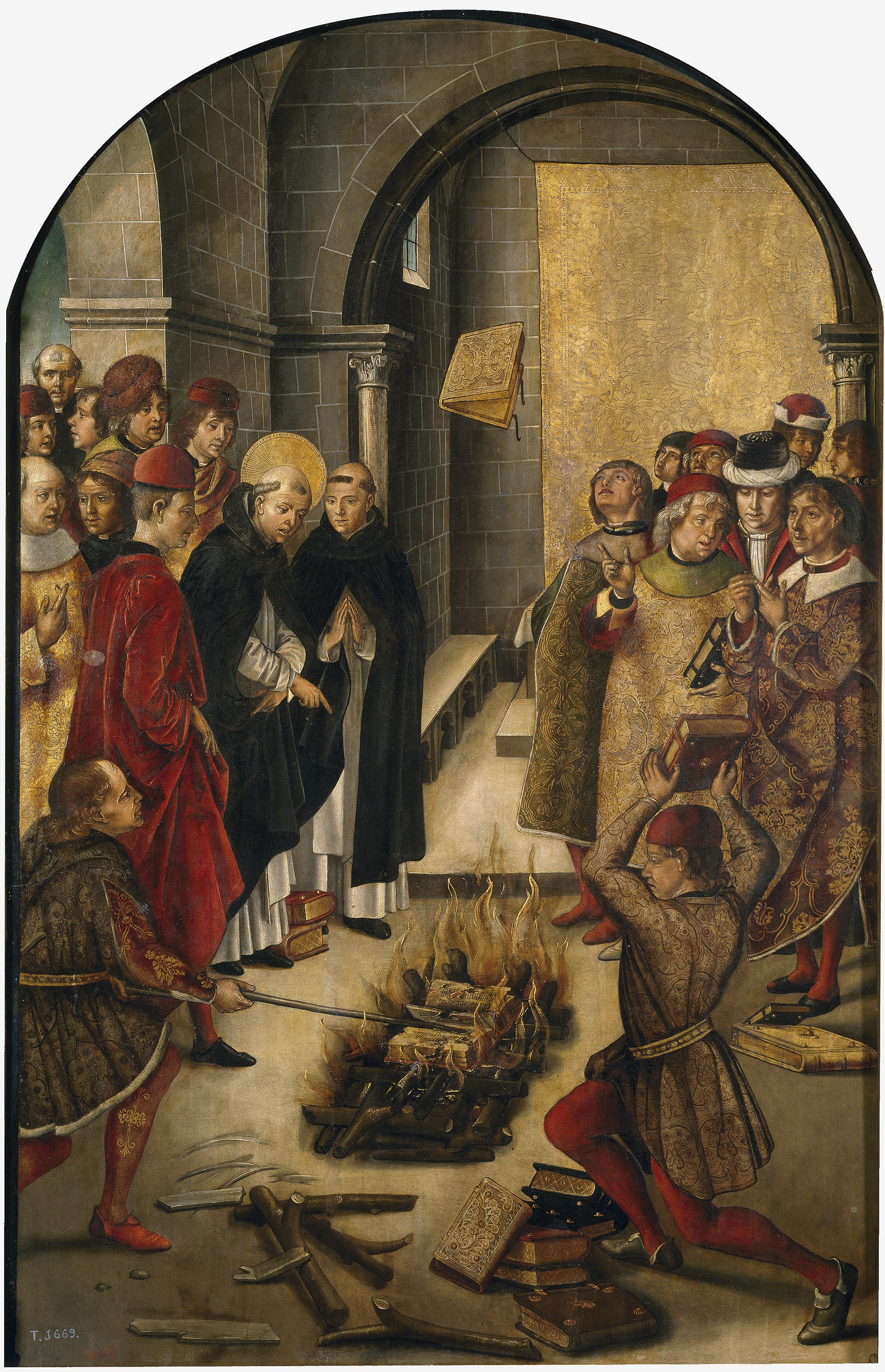
Painting by Pedro Berruguete portraying the story of a disputation between Saint Dominic and the Cathars (Albigensians), in which the books of both were thrown on a fire and Dominic's books were miraculously preserved from the flames.

The Cathars also refused the sacrament of the eucharist, saying that it could not possibly be the body of Christ. They also refused to partake in the practice of Baptism by water. The following two quotes are taken from the Inquisitor Bernard Gui's experiences with the Cathar practices and beliefs:

Then they attack and vituperate, in turn, all the sacraments of the Church, especially the sacrament of the eucharist, saying that it cannot contain the body of Christ, for had this been as great as the largest mountain Christians would have entirely consumed it before this. They assert that the host comes from straw, that it passes through the tails of horses, to wit, when the flour is cleaned by a sieve (of horse hair); that, moreover, it passes through the body and comes to a vile end, which, they say, could not happen if God were in it. Of baptism, they assert that the water is material and corruptible and is therefore the creation of the evil power, and cannot sanctify the spirit, but that the churchmen sell this water out of avarice, just as they sell earth for the burial of the dead, and oil to the sick when they anoint them, and as they sell the confession of sins as made to the priests.

=== Social relationships ===
Killing was abhorrent to the Cathars. Consequently, abstention from all animal food, sometimes exempting fish, was enjoined of the Perfecti. The Perfecti avoided eating anything considered to be a by-product of sexual reproduction. War and capital punishment were condemned—an abnormality in Medieval Europe—despite the fact that the sect had armed combatants prepared to engage in combat and kill on its behalf. For example, the Papal Legate, Pierre de Castelnau, was assassinated in January 1208 in Provence.

To the Cathars, reproduction was a moral evil to be avoided, as it continued the chain of reincarnation and suffering in the material world. Such was the situation that a charge of heresy levelled against a suspected Cathar was usually dismissed if the accused could show that he was legally married.

Despite the implicit antisemitism of their views on the Old Testament God, the Cathars had little hostility to Jews as an ethnic group; probably, Jews had a higher status in Cathar territories than they had elsewhere in Europe at the time. Cathars appointed Jews as bailiffs and to other roles as public officials, which further increased the Catholic Church's anger at the Cathars.

Despite their condemnation of reproduction, the Cathars grew in numbers in southeastern France. By 1207, shortly before the murder of the Papal Legate Castelnau, many towns in that region, i.e., Provence and its vicinity, were almost completely populated by Cathari, and the Cathari population had many ties to nearby communities. When Bishop Fulk of Toulouse, a key leader of the anti-Cathar persecutions, excoriated the Languedoc Knights for not pursuing the heretics more diligently, he received the reply, "We cannot. We have been reared in their midst. We have relatives among them and we see them living lives of perfection."

=== Hierarchy ===
It has been alleged that the Cathar Church of the Languedoc had a relatively flat structure, distinguishing between the baptised Perfecti (a term they did not use; instead, bonhommes) and ordinary unbaptised believers (credentes). By about 1140, liturgy and a system of doctrine had been established. They created a number of bishoprics, first at Albi around 1165 and after the 1167 Council at Saint-Félix-Lauragais sites at Toulouse, Carcassonne, and Agen, so that four bishoprics were in existence by 1200.

In about 1225, during a lull in the Albigensian Crusade, the bishopric of Razès was added. Bishops were supported by their two assistants: a filius maior (typically the successor) and a filius minor, who were further assisted by deacons. The Perfecti were the spiritual elite, highly respected by many of the local people, leading a life of austerity and charity. In the apostolic fashion, they ministered to the people and travelled in pairs.

=== Role of women ===
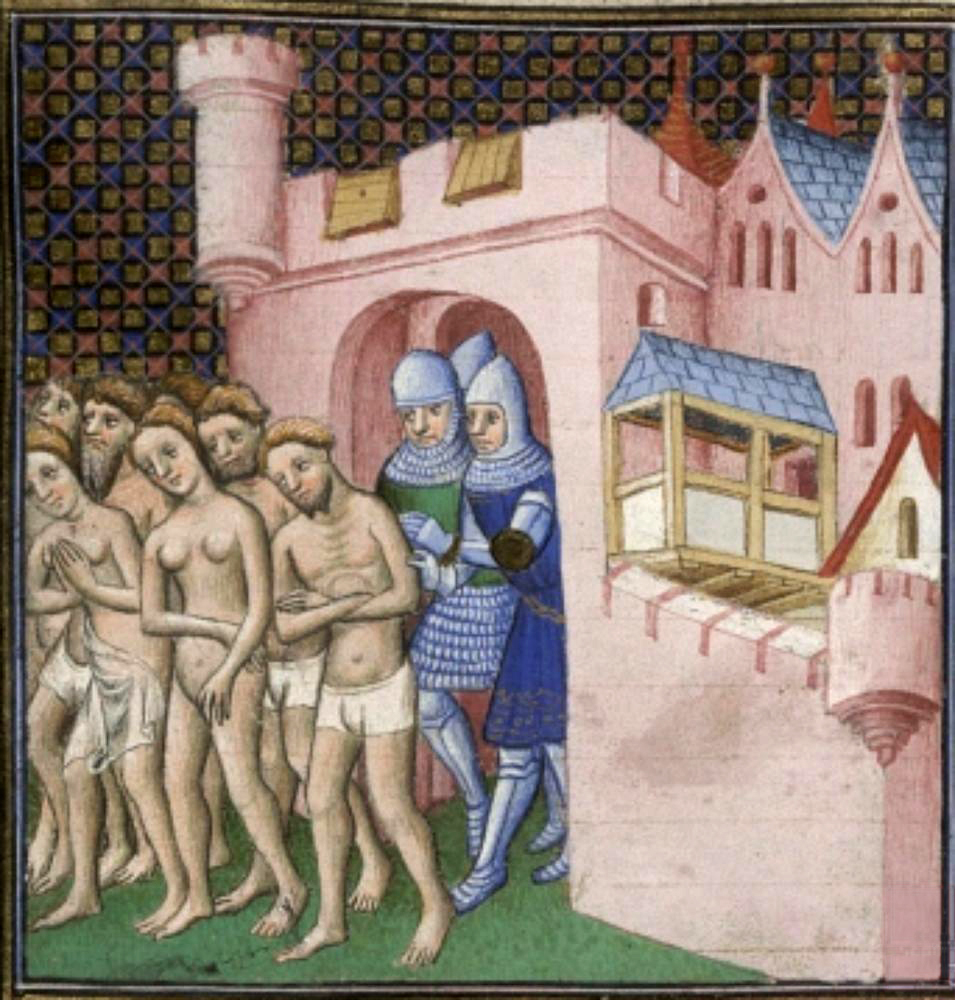
Cathars being expelled from Carcassonne in 1209.

Catharism has been seen as giving women the greatest opportunities for independent action, since there were female Perfecti, who were able to administer the sacrament of the consolamentum.

Cathars believed that a person would be repeatedly reincarnated until they committed to self-denial of the material world. A man could be reincarnated as a woman and vice versa. The spirit was of utmost importance to the Cathars and was described as being immaterial and sexless. Because of this belief, the Cathars saw women as equally capable of being spiritual leaders.

Women accused of being heretics in early medieval Christianity included those labelled Gnostics, Cathars, and, later, the Beguines, as well as several other groups that were sometimes "tortured and executed". Cathars, like the Gnostics who preceded them, assigned more importance to the role of Mary Magdalene in the spread of early Christianity than the Church previously did. Her vital role as a teacher contributed to the Cathar belief that women could serve as spiritual leaders. Women were included in the Perfecti in significant numbers, with numerous receiving the consolamentum after being widowed. Having reverence for the Gospel of John, the Cathars saw Mary Magdalene as perhaps even more important than Saint Peter, the founder of the Church.

Catharism attracted numerous women with the promise of a leadership role that the Catholic Church did not allow. Catharism let women become a Perfect. These female Perfects were required to adhere to a strict and ascetic lifestyle, but were still able to have their own houses. Although many women found something attractive in Catharism, not all found its teachings convincing. A notable example is Hildegard of Bingen, who in 1163 gave a rousing exhortation against the Cathars in Cologne. During this discourse, Hildegard announced God's eternal damnation on all who accepted Cathar beliefs.

While women Perfects rarely travelled to preach the faith, they still played a vital role in the spreading of Catharism by establishing group homes for women. Though it was extremely uncommon, there were isolated cases of female Cathars leaving their homes to spread the faith. In Cathar communal homes (ostals), women were educated in the faith. These women would go on to bear children who would then become believers. Through this pattern, the faith grew exponentially through the efforts of women, as each generation passed.

Despite women having a role in the growth of the faith, Catharism was not completely equal. For example, there was a belief that one's last incarnation had to be experienced as a man to break the cycle. This belief was inspired by later French Cathars, who taught that women must be reborn as men in order to achieve salvation. Toward the end of the Cathar movement, Catharism became less equal and started the practice of excluding women Perfects. However, this trend remained limited. For example, later on, Italian Perfects still included women.

== Suppression ==
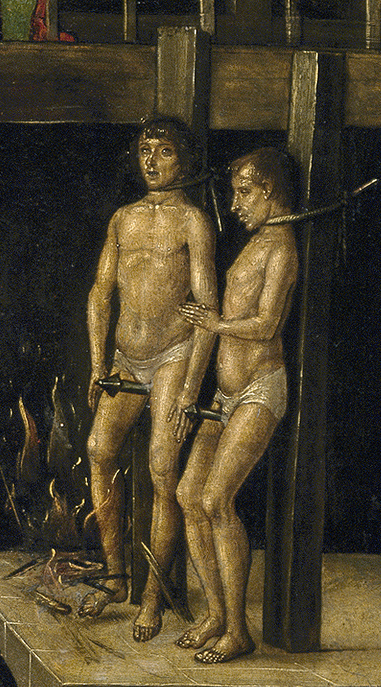
Condemned Cathars at an auto-da-fé, as depicted by the Spanish artist Pedro Berruguete

In 1147, Pope Eugene III sent a legate to the Cathar district in order to arrest the progress of the Cathars. The few isolated successes of Bernard of Clairvaux could not obscure the poor results of this mission, which clearly showed the power of the sect in the Languedoc at that period. The missions of Cardinal Peter of Saint Chrysogonus to Toulouse and the Toulousain in 1178, and of Henry of Marcy, cardinal-bishop of Albano, in 1180–81, obtained merely momentary successes. Henry's armed expedition, which took the stronghold at Lavaur, did not extinguish the movement.

Decisions of Catholic Church councils—in particular, those of the Council of Tours (1163) and of the Third Council of the Lateran (1179)—had scarcely more effect upon the Cathars. When Pope Innocent III came to power in 1198, he was resolved to deal with them.

At first, Innocent tried peaceful conversion, and sent a number of legates into the Cathar regions. They had to contend not only with the Cathars, the nobles who protected them, and the people who respected them, but also with many of the bishops of the region, who resented the considerable authority the Pope had conferred upon his legates. In 1204, Innocent III suspended a number of bishops in Occitania. In 1205, he appointed a new and vigorous bishop of Toulouse, the former troubadour Foulques. In 1206, Diego of Osma and his canon, the future Saint Dominic, began a programme of conversion in Languedoc. As part of this, Catholic–Cathar public debates were held at Verfeil, Servian, Pamiers, Montréal and elsewhere.

Dominic met and debated with the Cathars in 1203 during his mission to the Languedoc. He concluded that only preachers who displayed real sanctity, humility and asceticism could win over convinced Cathar believers. The institutional Church as a general rule did not possess these spiritual warrants. His conviction eventually led to the establishment of the Dominican Order in 1216. The order was to live up to the terms of his rebuke, "Zeal must be met by zeal, humility by humility, false sanctity by real sanctity, preaching falsehood by preaching truth." However, even Dominic managed only a few converts among the Cathars.

=== Albigensian Crusade ===
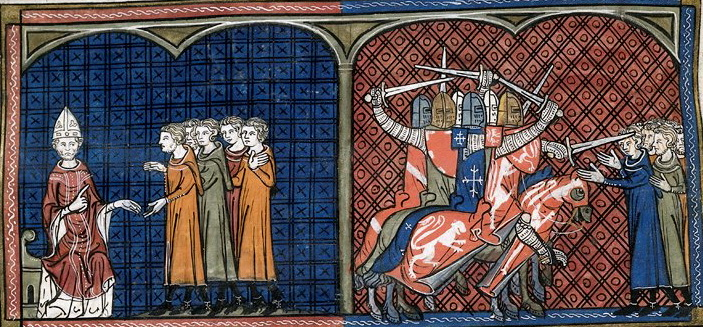
Pope Innocent III excommunicating the Albigensians (left), massacre of the Albigensians by the crusaders (right)

In January 1208, the papal legate, Pierre de Castelnau, a Cistercian monk, theologian and canon lawyer, was sent to meet the ruler of the area, Raymond VI, Count of Toulouse. Known for excommunicating noblemen who protected the Cathars, Castelnau excommunicated Raymond for abetting heresy, following an allegedly fierce argument during which Raymond supposedly threatened Castelnau with violence. Shortly thereafter, Castelnau was murdered as he returned to Rome, allegedly by a knight in the service of Count Raymond. His body was returned and laid to rest in the Abbey of Saint-Gilles.

As soon as he heard of the murder, the Pope ordered the legates to preach a crusade against the Cathars, and wrote a letter to Philip Augustus, King of France, appealing for his intervention—or an intervention led by his son, Louis. This was not the first appeal, but some see the murder of the legate as a turning point in papal policy, which had hitherto refrained from the use of military force. Raymond of Toulouse was excommunicated, the second such instance, in 1209.

King Philip II of France refused to lead the crusade himself, and could not spare his son, Prince Louis VIII, to do so either—despite his victory against John, King of England, as there were still pressing issues with Flanders and the empire along with the threat of an Angevin revival. While King Philip II could not lead the crusade nor spare his son, he sanctioned the participation of some of his barons, notably Simon de Montfort and Bouchard de Marly. The twenty years of war against the Cathars and their allies in the Languedoc that followed were called the Albigensian Crusade, derived from Albi, the capital of the Albigensian district, the district corresponding to the present-day French department of Tarn.

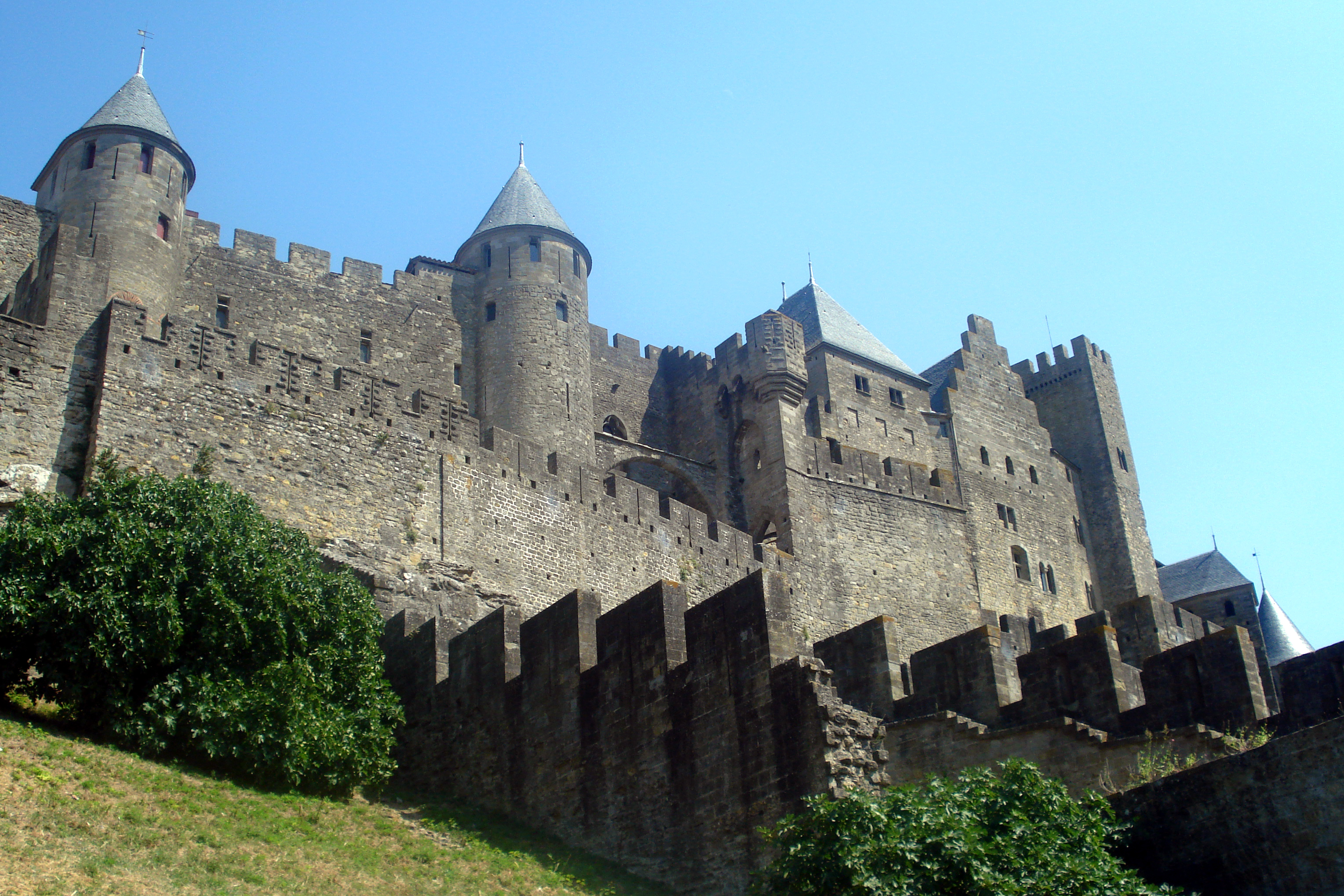
Cité de Carcassonne in 2007

This war pitted the nobles of France against those of the Languedoc. The widespread northern enthusiasm for the Crusade was partially inspired by a papal decree that permitted the confiscation of lands owned by Cathars and their supporters. This angered not only the lords of the south, but also the King Philip II of France, who was at least nominally the suzerain of the lords whose lands were now open to seizure. King Philip II wrote to Pope Innocent in strong terms to point this out—but Pope Innocent refused to change his decree. As the Languedoc was supposedly teeming with Cathars and Cathar sympathisers, this made the region a target for northern French noblemen looking to acquire new fiefs.

The first target for the barons of the North were the lands of the Trencavel, powerful lords of Carcassonne, Béziers, Albi, and the Razes. Little was done to form a regional coalition, and the crusading army was able to take Carcassonne, the Trencavel capital, incarcerating Raymond Roger Trencavel in his own citadel, where he died within three months. Champions of the Occitan cause claimed that he was murdered. Simon de Montfort was granted the Trencavel lands by Pope Innocent, thus incurring the enmity of Peter II of Aragon, who previously had been aloof from the conflict, even acting as a mediator at the time of the siege of Carcassonne.

The remainder of the first of the two Cathar wars now focused on Simon de Monfort's attempt to hold on to his gains through the winters. With a small force of confederates operating from the main winter camp at Fanjeaux, he was faced with the desertion of local lords who had sworn fealty to him out of necessity—and attempts to enlarge his newfound domain during the summer. His forces were then greatly augmented by reinforcements from northern France, Germany, and elsewhere.

De Montfort's summer campaigns recaptured losses sustained in winter months, in addition to attempts to widen the crusade's sphere of operation. Notably he was active in the Aveyron at St. Antonin and on the banks of the Rhône at Beaucaire. Simon de Monfort's greatest triumph was the victory against superior numbers at the Battle of Muret in 1213—a battle in which de Montfort's much smaller force, composed entirely of cavalry, decisively defeated the much-larger, by some estimates 5–10 times larger and combined-force allied armies of Raymond of Toulouse, his Occitan allies, and Peter II of Aragon. The battle saw the death of Peter II, which effectively ended the ambitions and influence of the house of Aragon/Barcelona in the Languedoc.

In 1214, Philip II's victory at Bouvines near Lille ended the Anglo-French War of 1213–1214, dealt a death blow to the Angevin Empire, and freed Philip II to concentrate more of his attentions to the Albigensian Crusade underway in the south of France. In addition, the victory at Bouvines was against an Anglo-German force that was attempting to undermine the power of the French crown. An Anglo-German victory would have been a serious setback to the crusade. Full French royal intervention in support of the crusade occurred in early 1226, when Louis VIII of France led a substantial force into southeastern France.

=== Massacre ===
The crusader army came under the command, both spiritually and militarily, of the papal legate Arnaud Amalric, Abbot of Cîteaux. In the first significant engagement of the war, the town of Béziers was besieged on 22 July 1209. The Catholic inhabitants of the city were granted the freedom to leave unharmed, but many refused and opted to stay and fight alongside the Cathars.

The townsmen spent much of 1209 fending off the crusaders. The Béziers army attempted a sortie but was quickly defeated, then pursued by the crusaders back through the gates and into the city. Arnaud Amalric, the Cistercian abbot-commander, wrote to Pope Innocent III, that during negotiations his soldiers had taken the initiative without waiting for orders. The doors of the church of St Mary Magdalene were broken down and the refugees dragged out and slaughtered. Reportedly, at least 7,000 men, women and children were killed there by Catholic forces, though some scholars dispute this number. Elsewhere in the town, many more thousands were mutilated and killed. Prisoners were blinded, dragged behind horses, and used for target practice. What remained of the city was razed by fire.

Arnaud Amalric wrote "Today your Holiness, twenty thousand heretics were put to the sword, regardless of rank, age, or sex." The permanent population of Béziers at that time was then between 10,000 and 14,500, but local refugees seeking shelter within the city walls could conceivably have increased the number to 20,000, though scholars dispute the figure as figurative.

According to a report thirty years later by a non-witness, Arnaud Amalric is supposed to have been asked how to tell Cathars from Catholics. His alleged reply, according to Caesarius of Heisterbach, a fellow Cistercian, was "Caedite eos. Novit enim Dominus qui sunt eius"—"Kill them all, the Lord will recognise His own".

After the success of his siege of Carcassonne, which followed the massacre at Béziers in 1209, Simon de Montfort was designated as leader of the Crusader army. Prominent opponents of the Crusaders were Raymond Roger Trencavel, viscount of Carcassonne, and his feudal overlord Peter II of Aragon, who held fiefdoms and had a number of vassals in the region. Peter died fighting against the crusade on 12 September 1213 at the Battle of Muret. Simon de Montfort was killed on 25 June 1218 after maintaining a siege of Toulouse for nine months.

=== Treaty and persecution ===
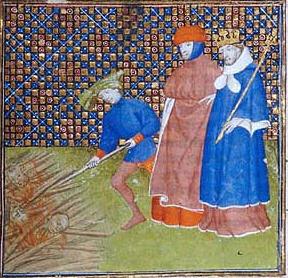
The burning of the Cathar heretics

The official war ended in the Treaty of Paris (1229), by which the king of France dispossessed the House of Toulouse of the greater part of its fiefs, and the house of the Trencavels of the whole of their fiefs. The independence of the princes of the Languedoc was at an end. In spite of the wholesale massacre of Cathars during the war, Catharism was not yet extinguished, and Catholic forces would continue to pursue Cathars.

In 1215, the bishops of the Catholic Church met at the Fourth Council of the Lateran under Pope Innocent III. Part of the agenda was combating the Cathar heresy.

The Inquisition was established in 1233 to uproot the remaining Cathars. Operating in the south at Toulouse, Albi, Carcassonne and other towns during the whole of the 13th century, and a great part of the 14th, it succeeded in crushing Catharism as a popular movement, driving its remaining adherents underground. Cathars who refused to recant or relapsed were hanged, or burnt at the stake.

On Friday 13 May 1239, in Champagne, 183 men and women convicted of Catharism were burned at the stake on the orders of the Dominican inquisitor and former Cathar Perfect Robert le Bougre. Mount Guimar, in northeastern France, had already been denounced as a place of heresy in a letter of the Bishop of Liège to Pope Lucius II in 1144.

From May 1243 to March 1244, the Cathar fortress of Montségur was besieged by the troops of the seneschal of Carcassonne and the archbishop of Narbonne. On 16 March 1244, a large and symbolically important massacre took place, wherein over 200 Cathar Perfects were burnt in an enormous pyre at the prat dels cremats ("field of the burned") near the foot of the castle. The Church, at the 1235 Council of Narbonne, decreed lesser chastisements against laymen suspected of sympathy with Cathars.

Inquisitors required heretical sympathisers—repentant first offenders—to sew a yellow cross onto their clothes.

A popular though as yet unsubstantiated belief holds that a small party of Cathar Perfects escaped from the fortress prior to the massacre at prat dels cremats. It is widely held in the Cathar region to this day that the escapees took with them "the Cathar treasure". What this treasure consisted of has been a matter of considerable speculation: claims range from sacred Gnostic texts to the Cathars' accumulated wealth, which might have included the Holy Grail (see § Historical and current scholarship below).

Hunted by the Inquisition and deserted by the nobles of their districts, the Cathars became more and more scattered fugitives, meeting surreptitiously in forests and mountain wilds. Later insurrections broke out under the leadership of Roger-Bernard II, Count of Foix, Aimery III of Narbonne, and Bernard Délicieux, a Franciscan friar later prosecuted for his adherence to another heretical movement, that of the Spiritual Franciscans at the beginning of the 14th century. By this time, the Inquisition had grown very powerful. Consequently, many presumed to be Cathars were summoned to appear before it.

Precise indications of this are found in the registers of the Inquisitors Bernard of Caux, Jean de St Pierre, Geoffroy d'Ablis, and others. The perfects, it was said, only rarely recanted, and hundreds were burnt. Repentant lay believers were punished, but their lives were spared as long as they did not relapse. Having recanted, they were obliged to sew yellow crosses onto their outdoor clothing and to live apart from other Catholics, at least for a time.

=== Annihilation ===
After several decades of harassment and re-proselytising, and, perhaps even more important, the systematic destruction of their religious texts, the sect was exhausted and could find no more adepts. In April 1310, the leader of a Cathar revival in the Pyrenean foothills, Peire Autier, was captured and executed in Toulouse. After 1330, the records of the Inquisition contain very few proceedings against Cathars. In the autumn of 1321, the last known Cathar perfect in the Languedoc, Guillaume Bélibaste, was executed.

From the mid-12th century onwards, Italian Catharism came under increasing pressure from the Pope and the Inquisition, "spelling the beginning of the end." Other movements, such as the Waldensians and the pantheistic Brethren of the Free Spirit, which suffered persecution in the same area, survived in remote areas and in small numbers through the 14th and 15th centuries. The Waldensian movement continues today. Waldensian ideas influenced other proto-Protestant sects, such as the Hussites, Lollards, and the Moravian Church.

==== Genocide ====
Raphael Lemkin, who coined the word "genocide" in the 20th century, referred to the Albigensian Crusade as "one of the most conclusive cases of genocide in religious history". Mark Gregory Pegg wrote that "The Albigensian Crusade ushered genocide into the West by linking divine salvation to mass murder, by making slaughter as loving an act as His sacrifice on the cross."

Robert E. Lerner argues that Pegg's classification of the Albigensian Crusade as a genocide is inappropriate, on the ground that it "was proclaimed against unbelievers ... not against a 'genus' or people; those who joined the crusade had no intention of annihilating the population of southern France ... If Pegg wishes to connect the Albigensian Crusade to modern ethnic slaughter, well—words fail me (as they do him)."

Laurence Marvin is not as dismissive as Lerner regarding Pegg's contention that the Albigensian Crusade was a genocide. He does however take issue with Pegg's argument that the Albigensian Crusade formed an important historical precedent for later genocides, including the Holocaust.

Kurt Jonassohn and Karin Solveig Björnson describe the Albigensian Crusade as "the first ideological genocide". Kurt Jonassohn and Frank Chalk, who together founded the Montreal Institute for Genocide and Human Rights Studies, include a detailed case study of the Albigensian Crusade in their genocide studies textbook The History and Sociology of Genocide: Analyses and Case Studies, authored by Joseph R. Strayer and Malise Ruthven.

In 2023, Pegg highlights in the Cambridge World History of Genocide, how since his 2008 work a variety of other scholars from different disciplinary backgrounds have concluded that the Albigensian crusade was genocidal in nature.

=== Pays cathare ===
The term Pays cathare, French meaning "Cathar Country", is used to highlight the Cathar heritage and history of the region in which Catharism was traditionally strongest. The area is centered around fortresses such as Montségur and Carcassonne, known as the Cathar castles; also, the French département of the Aude uses the title Pays cathare in tourist brochures. The areas have ruins from the wars against the Cathars that are still visible today.

== Interrogation of heretics ==
In an effort to find the few remaining heretics in and around the village of Montaillou, Jacques Fournier, Bishop of Pamiers, future Pope Benedict XII, had those suspected of heresy interrogated in the presence of scribes who recorded their conversations. The late 13th- to early-14th-century document, the Fournier Register, discovered in the Vatican archives in the 1960s and edited by Jean Duvernoy, is the basis for Emmanuel Le Roy Ladurie's work Montaillou: The Promised Land of Error.

== Historical and current scholarship ==
The publication of the early scholarly book Crusade Against the Grail, by the young German and later SS officer, Otto Rahn in the 1930s, rekindled interest in the connection between the Cathars and the Holy Grail, especially in Germany. Rahn was convinced that the 13th-century work Parzival by Wolfram von Eschenbach was a veiled account of the Cathars. The ideologue and Nazi government official Alfred Rosenberg speaks favourably of the Cathars in The Myth of the Twentieth Century.

Academic books in English first appeared at the beginning of the 21st century: for example, Malcolm Lambert's The Cathars and Malcolm Barber's The Cathars.

=== Origins and transmission ===
The academic discussion surrounding the origins of Catharism evolved significantly over the 20th and 21st century. Early models posited ancient dualistic connections and descent, where else modern standings support more localized contexts.

In 20th-century scholarship, some historians such as Dimitri Obolensky and Steven Runciman originally proposed that the Cathars may have had traceable diffusion from Manicheism, as well as early Gnostic movements, while still acknowledging the bias and polemics of Catholic accounts. This direct-descent view was heavily questioned, and has widely been rejected by modern scholarship following the discovery of primary Manichean texts. In contrast to the consensus, traditional Catholic scholarship which takes the polemical medieval accounts at face value, continues to broadly associate the Cathars with Manicheism.

The current academic debate on Cathar origin revolves around two frameworks. Whether the Cathars have a transmission through the Byzantine Empire as argued by Malcolm Barber, Janet and Bernard Hamilton and company; or that they were an independent and local Latin Christian development unrelated to any "dualistic heresy" as argued by Robert Ian Moore, Mark Gregory Pegg amongst others.

=== Debate on the nature and existence of Catharism ===
Starting in the 1990s and continuing to the present day, historians like R. I. Moore have challenged the extent to which Catharism, as an institutionalised religion, actually existed. Building on the work of French historians such as Monique Zerner and Uwe Brunn, Moore's The War on Heresy argues that Catharism was "contrived from the resources of [the] well-stocked imaginations" of churchmen, "with occasional reinforcement from miscellaneous and independent manifestations of local anticlericalism or apostolic enthusiasm." In short, Moore claims that the men and women persecuted as Cathars were not the followers of a secret religion imported from the East. Instead, they were part of a broader spiritual revival taking place in the later twelfth and early thirteenth centuries. Moore's work is indicative of a larger historiographical trend towards examining how heresy was constructed by the church.

Scholars since the 1990s have referred to the fearful rumours of Cathars as a moral panic. The crusade against Cathars as a possibly-imaginary enemy has been compared to European witch-hunts, anti-Semitic persecution, and the Satanic Panic.

In 2016, Cathars in Question, edited by Antonio Sennis, presented a range of conflicting views by academics of medieval heresy, including Feuchter, Stoyanov, Sackville, Taylor, D'Avray, Biller, Moore, Bruschi, Pegg, Hamilton, Arnold, and Théry-Astruc, who had met at University College London and the Warburg Institute in London in April 2013. Sennis describes the debate as about "an issue which is highly controversial and hotly debated among scholars: the existence of a medieval phenomenon which we can legitimately call 'Catharism.'"

Andrew Roach in The English Historical Review commented that "Reconciliation still seems some distance away [among the] distinguished, if sometimes cantankerous, scholars" who contributed to the volume. He said:

The debate is a now familiar one which has been rehearsed for a number of periods and contexts, namely, given that the overwhelming majority of sources about medieval heresy come not from "heretics" themselves but from their persecutors, is there any way historians can be sure that this classification is not just a result of mindsets driven by pre-conceptions of what is correct or the conscious "fitting up" of opponents?

— Roach 2018, pp. 396–398

Rebecca Rist describes the academic controversy as the "heresy debate"—"some of it very heated"—about whether Catharism was a "real heresy with Balkans origins, or rather a construct of western medieval culture, whose authorities wanted to persecute religious dissidents." Rist adds that some historians say the group was an invention of the medieval Church, so there never was a Cathar heresy; while she agrees that the medieval Church exaggerated its threat, she says there is evidence of the heresy's existence.

Claire Taylor has called for a "post-revisionism" in the debate, saying that legacy historians assumed the heresy was a form of dualism and therefore a form of Bogomilism, whereas "revisionists" have focused on social origins to explain the dissent. Lucy Sackville has argued that while the revisionists rightly point to the Cathars' opaque origins and their branding as 'Manichaeans,' this does not mean we should disregard all evidence that their heresy had an organised theology.

== In art and music ==
The principal legacy of the Cathar movement is in the poems and songs of the Cathar troubadours, though this artistic legacy is only a smaller part of the wider Occitan linguistic and artistic heritage. The Occitan song Lo Boièr is particularly associated with Catharism. Recent artistic projects concentrating on the Cathar element in Provençal and troubadour art include commercial recording projects by Thomas Binkley, electric hurdy-gurdy artist Valentin Clastrier, La Nef, and Jordi Savall.

In popular culture, Catharism has been linked with the Knights Templar, an active order of monks founded after the First Crusade (1095–1099). This link has caused fringe theories about the Cathars and the possibility of their possession of the Holy Grail, such as in the pseudohistorical The Holy Blood and the Holy Grail.

== Reinterpretations ==
=== Protestants ===
Protestants such as John Foxe, in the 16th century, and Jean Duvernoy, in the 20th century, argued that Cathars followed Proto-Protestant theology, though they were criticised by many historians. Foxe argued that they followed Calvinist soteriology. Such have argued that Cathars did not follow dualism but instead argued that such accusations were either misinterpretations of Cathar theology, wrongly attributed to Cathars or merely hostile claims.

Other historians have also argued that Cathars instead followed Protestant theology because the Reformation spread rapidly to the land in which Cathars mainly existed. They argued that the people "held Protestant ideas" well before the Reformation. However, such arguments are generally viewed as weak, for instance because of the need to downplay the dualism not present in Protestantism.

=== Baptists ===
Twentieth-century Baptists have argued that the Cathars are part of Baptist successionism, placing the Cathars as forerunners of Baptist theology. James Milton Carroll claimed in his book The Trail of Blood that the Novatianists, or Cathari, were ascendants of Baptist groups. Writing for Catholic Answers, Dwight Longenecker, says there is no historical proof for Baptist successionism.

Hisel Berlin, advocating for the Baptist successionist theory, argued that claims about the Cathars were mainly false and that they denied things such as infant baptism. Since the end of the 19th century, the trend in academic Baptist historiography has been away from the successionist viewpoint to the view that modern day Baptists are an outgrowth of 17th-century English Separatism.

== See also ==
- Antonin Gadal
- Athinganoi
- Cathar castles
- Comparison of Catharism and Protestantism
- Crusades
  - Albigensian Crusade
- Edmund Hamer Broadbent – The Pilgrim Church
- Positive Christianity
- Strigolniki

== Sources ==
- Alphandéry, Paul Daniel (1911). "Albigenses" . In Chisholm, Hugh (ed.). Encyclopædia Britannica. Vol. 1 (11th ed.). Cambridge University Press. pp. 505–506.
- Barber, Malcolm (2000). The Cathars: Dualist heretics in Languedoc in the High Middle Ages. Harlow: Longman. ISBN 978-0582256620.
- Barnstone, Willis; Meyer, Marvin (2006). The Gnostic Bible. Shambhala. ISBN 978-1-59030-199-9.
- Belloc, Hilaire (1938). The Great Heresies. London: Sheed & Ward. p. 86.
- Biller, Peter (2014). "Review of The War on Heresy: Faith and Power in Medieval Europe (review no. 1546)". Reviews in History (with R. I. Moore's response). Archived from the original on 25 June 2018.
- Blum, Jean (2007). Cátaros: Su misterio y su mensaje [Cathars: Their Mystery and Their Message] (in Spanish). EDAF. ISBN 978-84-414113-7-1.
- (in French) Brunn, Uwe (2006), Des contestataires aux "cathares" : Discours de réforme et propagande antihérétique dans les pays du Rhin et de la Meuse avant l'Inquisition, Paris, Institut d'études augustiniennes
- Burr, David (1996), Bernard Gui: Inquisitor's Manual, Internet History Sourcebooks Project, New York City: Fordham University, archived from the original on 10 September 2013
- Bütz, Jeffrey J. (2009). The Secret Legacy of Jesus: The Judaic Teachings That Passed from James the Just to the Founding Fathers. Simon & Schuster. ISBN 978-1-59477-921-3.
- Chalk, Frank; Jonassohn, Kurt (1990). The History and Sociology of Genocide: Analyses and Case Studies. Yale University Press. ISBN 978-0-300-04446-1.
- Clark, Elizabeth A. (2001), "Women, Gender, and the Study of Christian History", Church History, vol. 70, Cambridge University Press, pp. 395–426, doi:10.2307/3654496, JSTOR 3654496, S2CID 163134950
- Crawford, Jack (21 December 2020). "The Cathars: Persecuting Heretical Christians In The 13th Century". TheCollector.
- "Albigensians". The Columbia Electronic Encyclopedia. Columbia University Press. 2022a. Archived from the original on 19 January 2012.
- "Cathari", Columbia Encyclopedia, Columbia University Press, 2022b
- Cross, I. K. (1990). The Battle For Baptist History. Columbus, Georgia: Brentwood Christian Press. ISBN 978-0-89211-337-8.
- Jean Duvernoy, Jean: transcriptions of inquisitorial manuscripts, many hitherto unpublished
- Dondaine, Antoine O. P. (1939), Un traité neo-manichéen du XIIIe siècle: Le Liber de duobus principiis, suivi d'un fragment de rituel Cathare [A neo-Manichean treatise from the 13th century: The Liber de duobus principiis, followed by a fragment of Cathar ritual] (in French), Rome: Institutum Historicum Fratrum Praedicatorum
- Fichtenau, Heinrich (2010). Heretics and Scholars in the High Middle Ages, 1000–1200. Pennsylvania State University Press. ISBN 978-0-271-04374-6.
- Frassetto, Michael, ed. (2006). Heresy and the Persecuting Society in the Middle Ages: Essays on the Work of R.I. Moore. Brill. ISBN 978-90-04-15098-0.
- Haskins, Charles (1902). "Robert Le Bougre and the Beginnings of the Inquisition in Northern France". The American Historical Review. 7 (4): 631–652. doi:10.2307/1834561. JSTOR 1834561.
- Berlin, Hisel (2017). Baptist History Notebook.
- Huey, Whitney (2012) [2011]. "Cathars". The Encyclopedia of Christian Civilization. Chichester, West Sussex: Wiley-Blackwell. doi:10.1002/9780470670606.wbecc0246. ISBN 9781405157629.
- John of Damascus (2012) [1958], Writings: The Fount of Knowledge: The Philosophical Chapters, On Heresies, The Orthodox Faith, The Fathers of the Church, Translator: Frederic H Chase (Reprint ed.), CreateSpace, ISBN 978-1470149246
- Johnson, Paul (1976). A History of Christianity. Atheneum. ISBN 0-689-70591-3.
- Johnston, Ruth A. (2011). All Things Medieval: An Encyclopedia of the Medieval World. Greenwood Press. p. 115. ISBN 978-0313364624.
- Johnston, William M.; Renkin, Claire (2000). Encyclopedia of Monasticism: A-L. Taylor & Francis. ISBN 978-1-57958-090-2.
- Jonassohn, Kurt; Björnson, Karin Solveig (1998). Genocide and Gross Human Rights Violations: In Comparative Perspective. Piscataway, New Jersey: Transaction Publishers. ISBN 978-1-4128-2445-3.
- Kaelber, Lutz (1997). "Weavers into Heretics? The Social Organization of Early-Thirteenth-Century Catharism in Comparative Perspective". Social Science History. 21 (1): 111–137. doi:10.1017/S0145553200017661. S2CID 147330134.
- Kienzle, Beverly Mayne (2001). Cistercians, heresy, and Crusade in Occitania, 1145–1229. York Medieval Press. ISBN 978-1903153000.
- Lambert, Malcolm (1998). The Cathars. Oxford: Blackwell. ISBN 978-0631143437.
- Lambert, Malcolm (2002). Medieval Heresy: Popular Movements from the Gregorian Reform to the Reformation. Oxford: Blackwell. ISBN 978-0631222767.
- Lansing, Carol (1998). Power & Purity: Cathar Heresy in Medieval Italy. Oxford University Press. ISBN 978-0-19-536247-3.
- Le Roy Ladurie, Emmanuel (1990). Montaillou: Cathars and Catholics in a French Village, 1294–1324. Penguin. ISBN 978-0-14-013700-2.
- "Lemkin, Raphael". UNHCR. 2001. Archived from the original on 29 November 2014.
- Lemkin, Raphael (2012). Jacobs, Steven Leonard (ed.). Lemkin on Genocide. Lanham, Maryland: Rowman & Littlefield. ISBN 978-0-7391-4526-5.
- Lerner, Robert E. (2010). "A Most Holy War: The Albigensian Crusade and the Battle for Christendom (review)". Common Knowledge. 16 (2): 292. doi:10.1215/0961754X-2009-101. S2CID 144965606.
- Longenecker, Dwight (2009). "The Case Against Baptist Successionism". Catholic Answers. Archived from the original on 30 June 2022.
- Luscombe, David; Riley-Smith, Jonathan (2004). The new Cambridge medieval history: c. 1024 – c. 1198. p. 522.
- Madaule, Jacques (1967). The Albigensian Crusade: An Historical Essay. New York: Fordham University Press.
- Martin, Sean (2005), The Cathars: The Most Successful Heresy of the Middle Ages, Pocket Essentials, ISBN 1-904048-33-1, archived from the original on 22 February 2014
- Marvin, Laurence W. (2009). "A Most Holy War: The Albigensian Crusade and the Battle for Christendom (review)". The Catholic Historical Review. 95 (4): 801–802. doi:10.1353/cat.0.0546. S2CID 159618901.
- Miller, Laura (22 February 2004). "The Last Word; The Da Vinci Con". The New York Times. Archived from the original on 28 July 2017.
- Moore, John Clare (2003). Pope Innocent III (1160/61–1216): To Root Up and to Plant. Brill. p. 180. ISBN 90-04-12925-1.
- Moore, Robert Ian (1977). The Origins of European Dissent. Allen Lane. ISBN 978-0-7139-0825-1.
- Moore, R. I. (1995). The Birth of Heresy. Medieval Academy of America. ISBN 0-8020-7659-9.
- Moore, R. I. (2012a). The War on Heresy. London: Profile Books. ISBN 9781846682001.
- Moore, R. I. (2012b). "Review of L. J. Sackville. Heresy and Heretics in the Thirteenth Century: The Textual Representations" (PDF). H-France Review. 12 (44). Archived (PDF) from the original on 12 June 2018.
- Murphy, Cullen (2012). God's Jury: The Inquisition and the Making of the Modern World. Houghton Mifflin Harcourt. ISBN 978-0-618-09156-0.
- Murray, Alexander (1998). Suicide in the Middle Ages. Oxford University Press. ISBN 0-19-820539-2.
- La Nef (1996). Montségur: La tragédie cathare. Dorian Recordings. DOR-90243.
- Newman, Barbara (1998). "Possessed by the Spirit: Devout Women, Demoniacs, and the Apostolic Life in the Thirteenth Century". Speculum. 73 (3): 733–770. doi:10.2307/2887496. JSTOR 2887496. S2CID 162081306.
- O'Shea, Stephen (2000). The Perfect Heresy: The Revolutionary Life and Death of the Medieval Cathars. New York: Walker & Company. ISBN 978-1861972705.
- Studio der frühen Musik, Claudi Martí (narration and vocals), Thomas Binkley (1975). L'Agonie du Languedoc (LP-Stereo). Germany: EMI. 1C 063-30 132.
- Oman, Charles (2012). A History of the Art of War: The Middle Ages from the Fourth to the Fourteenth Century. Tales End Press. ISBN 978-1-62358-003-2.
- "Pays Cathare". Archived from the original on 10 August 2008.
- Pegg, Mark (2001a). "On Cathars, Albigenses, and good men of Languedoc". Journal of Medieval History. 27 (2): 181–190. doi:10.1016/s0304-4181(01)00008-2. S2CID 159977250.
- Pegg, Mark (2008). A Most Holy War: The Albigensian Crusade and the Battle for Christendom. Oxford: Oxford University Press. ISBN 9780195171310.
- Pegg, Mark Gregory (10 January 2009). The Corruption of Angels: The Great Inquisition of 1245–1246. Princeton University Press. ISBN 978-1-4008-2475-5.
- Pegg, Mark Gregory (2023). "The Albigensian Crusade and the Early Inquisitions into Heretical Depravity, 1208–1246". In Kiernan, Ben; Lemos, Tracy Maria; Taylor, Tristan S. (eds.). The Cambridge World History of Genocide. Vol. I: Genocide in the Ancient, Medieval and Premodern Worlds. Cambridge University Press. pp. 470–497. doi:10.1017/9781108655989.021. ISBN 978-1-108-49353-6.
- Peters, Edward (1980). Heresy and Authority in Medieval Europe. University of Pennsylvania Press. ISBN 0-8122-1103-0.. A collection of primary sources, some on Catharism.
- Petrus Sarnensis (1998). The History of the Albigensian Crusade. Translated by Sibly, W. A.; Sibly, M. D. Boydell Press. ISBN 978-0-85115-807-5.
- Stephens, Prescott (1998). The Waldensian Story: A study in faith, intolerance and survival. Lewes, Sussex: Book Guild. ISBN 978-1-8577-6280-8.
- Preece, Rod (2008). Sins of the Flesh: A History of Ethical Vegetarian Thought. University of British Columbia Press. ISBN 978-0-7748-1509-3.
- Rist, Rebecca (6 March 2015). "Did the Cathars Exist?". Reading History.
- Roach, Andrew P. (2018). "Cathars in Question, ed. Antonio Sennis". The English Historical Review. 133 (561): 396–398. doi:10.1093/ehr/cey019. ISSN 0013-8266.
- Rogers, Clifford J. (2010). The Oxford Encyclopedia of Medieval Warfare and Military Technology. Oxford University Press. ISBN 978-0-19-533403-6.
- Rosenberg, Alfred (1980). Myth of the 20th century.
- Savall, Jordi (2009). The Forgotten Kingdom: The Cathar Tragedy – The Albigensian Crusade. Alia Vox. AVSA9873 A+C
- Schaff, Philip; Wace, Henry, eds. (1994) [1900], Nicene and Post-Nicene Fathers, Second Series, vol. 14: I Nice AD 325 (Canons of the Council of Nicaea), translated by Percival, Henry R. (Reprint ed.), Hendrickson, ISBN 978-1565631168
- Schaus, Margaret (2006). Women And Gender in Medieval Europe: An Encyclopedia. New York: Taylor & Francis Group. ISBN 978-0415969444.
- Sennis, Antonio, ed. (2016). Cathars in Question. Boydell & Brewer. ISBN 978-1-903153-68-0.
- Sibly, W. A.; Sibly, M. D. (2003). The Chronicle of William of Puylaurens: The Albigensian Crusade and Its Aftermath. Boydell Press. p. 128. ISBN 978-0851159256.
- Simpson, John, ed. (1989), Oxford English Dictionary (Second ed.), Oxford: Oxford University Press
- Smith, Andrew Phillip (2015). The Lost Teachings of the Cathars: Their Beliefs and Practices. Watkins. ISBN 978-1-78028-804-8.
- Stoyanov, Yuri (11 August 2000). The Other God: Dualist Religions from Antiquity to the Cathar Heresy. Yale University Press. ISBN 978-0-300-19014-4.
- Sumption, Jonathan (1999) [1978]. The Albigensian Crusade (New ed.). London: Faber and Faber. ISBN 978-0571200023.
- Sumption, Jonathan (2011). The Albigensian Crusade. Faber & Faber. ISBN 978-0-571-26657-9.
- Théry, Julien (2002), L'Hérésie des bons hommes (XIIe-début du XIVe s.). Comment nommer la dissidence religieuse non-vaudoise ni béguine en Languedoc? [The Heresy of the Good Men (12th-early 14th century). How to name the non-Vaudois or Beguine religious dissidence in Languedoc?], Heresis (in French), vol. 36–37, pp. 75–117
- Thompson, Damian (2008). Counterknowledge: How We Surrendered to Conspiracy Theories, Quack Medicine, Bogus Science and Fake History. Atlantic Books. ISBN 978-1-84354-675-7.
- Townsend, Anne Bradford (2008). The Cathars of Languedoc as Heretics: From the Perspectives of Five Contemporary Scholars. Union Institute & University. ISBN 978-0-549-59664-6. ProQuest 3311971.
- Tyerman, Christopher (2006). God's War: A New History of the Crusades. Cambridge, MA: Harvard University Press. ISBN 9780674023871.
- Victor, Jeffrey S. (1998). "Moral Panics and the Social Construction of Deviant Behavior: A Theory and Application to the Case of Ritual Child Abuse". Sociological Perspectives. 41 (3): 541–565. doi:10.2307/1389563. JSTOR 1389563. S2CID 18583486.
- Wakefield, Walter Leggett; Evans, Austin P. (1991). Heresies of the High Middle Ages. Columbia University Press. ISBN 978-0231096324.
- Walther, Daniel (1 January 1968). "Were the Albigenses and Waldenses Forerunners of the Reformation?". Andrews University Seminary Studies. 6 (2). ISSN 0003-2980.
- Ward, Jennifer (2002). Women in Medieval Europe, 1200–1500. London: Longman. ISBN 978-0582288270.
- Weis, René (2001). The Yellow Cross: The Story of the Last Cathars 1290–1329. New York: Random House.
