= Inquisition in France =

System of tribunals enforcing Catholic doctrine

France was one of the first countries where the papal inquisition was established in the 13th century. This ecclesiastical judicial institution was created to combat heresies. The southern region of France, Languedoc, was the primary center of inquisition activity in Europe until the mid-14th century. Most of the preserved sources concerning the inquisition (including trial materials) originate from this region. However, the history of the French Inquisition spans until the end of the 17th century and also encompasses other areas of the country.

Territorially, the jurisdiction of the French Inquisition extended beyond the borders of the Kingdom of France. French inquisitors also had authority over the western, French-speaking regions that were part of the Holy Roman Empire. The structure of the French Inquisition can be divided into four major areas:

- Southern France (Languedoc), with its main center in Toulouse;
- Northern France (including the southern Netherlands), with its main center in Paris;
- Provence, with its main center initially in Marseille and later in Avignon;
- Burgundy and Lorraine, with its main center in Besançon.

Although the division between northern and southern parts of the Kingdom of France was not formally maintained beyond the first two decades of the inquisition's existence in France, the local conditions in Languedoc were significantly different from those in the north. By around 1330, this division lost its importance.

== Heretics in France ==
Yellow cross of the Cathars – the identification mark imposed by the Inquisition that repentant heretics had to wear on their clothing

In the late Middle Ages, France was one of the countries most affected by the presence of non-Orthodox religious movements that opposed the Catholic Church. As early as 1022, in Orléans, a group of about a dozen heretics, primarily among the canons, was discovered. They denied, among other things, the reality of Christ's suffering and resurrection. Most of them were burned at the stake by order of King Robert II of France. This was the first known instance of such a penalty being applied to heretics in Western Europe. A few years later, Bishop Gerard of Cambrai and Arras discovered and arrested a group of heretics in his diocese who rejected the sacrament of marriage, but they submitted to his authority and made an Orthodox confession of faith. In the first half of the 12th century, unorthodox preachers like Henry the Monk, Pierre de Bruys (died circa 1140), and Éon de l'Étoile (died in prison shortly after 1148) gathered followers in various parts of France. However, their movements did not survive their deaths.

=== Cathars ===
From the mid-12th century, the dualist sect of the Cathars is noted for its presence in Languedoc, where it gained exceptionally strong standing. Following the Council of Saint-Félix (circa 1167 or circa 1175), it established its own church structures in Languedoc with bishops in Albi, Toulouse, Carcassonne, and Agen. The sect may have reached the northern part of the country even earlier, as the heretics captured in Soissons in 1114 likely belonged to it, though its influence was less significant there compared to Languedoc.

The development of the Cathar heresy in Languedoc was facilitated by the low moral and intellectual standards of the local clergy and the favorable attitude of a considerable portion of local feudal lords. The asceticism of the Cathar Perfect (the elite of the sect) contrasted with the lifestyle of many Catholic priests, including bishops. The rulers of Toulouse tolerated the sect's growth, and some members of the ruling family even supported it. Local ecclesiastical authorities also did not take any remedial actions for a long time, especially since there were no prominent figures in the episcopate at that time. In 1145, Bernard of Clairvaux preached against the heretics in Toulouse, and in 1165, Catholic bishops held a public debate with the heretics at the synod in Lombez, trying to persuade them to abandon their heresy. However, the effects of these initiatives were, at best, temporary. In Languedoc, there were no attempts to bring heretics to trial. Unlike in northern and eastern France, there were no lynchings (such as in Soissons circa 1114 or Vézelay in 1167), indicating that the lower classes were also favorably disposed towards the Cathars, also known as Albigensians from their main center in Albi.

The Cathar heresy was condemned at the council in Tours in 1163 and again at the Third Council of the Lateran in 1179. In 1178, papal legate Cardinal Pietro da Pavia visited Languedoc, and in 1181, Cardinal Henry of Marcy. These legates were the first to take, albeit on a small scale, repressive measures against the Cathars of Languedoc. Henry of Marcy led an armed expedition against Lavaur and only retreated when two Cathar Perfects were handed over to him. Both heretics converted to Catholicism and became canons in Toulouse. Cardinal Henry's expedition set a precedent for the use of the armed instrument of the crusade against heretics, whereas previously it had been reserved for the fight against infidels, primarily to liberate or defend the Holy Land.

=== Synod of Verona in 1184 ===
In 1184, at the Synod of Verona, Pope Lucius III once again condemned the Cathars and established rules for episcopal courts to handle cases of heresy. Bishops were required to visit their dioceses to search for heretics. If suspects were identified, an investigation was to be conducted, and the guilty were to be summoned to convert. If they refused, the heretics were to be handed over to secular authorities, who were obliged to cooperate with the bishops in combating heresy. The synod also condemned the Waldensian evangelical movement ("the Poor of Lyon") that was growing in southeastern France, for preaching without authorization. At that time, the differences between the Waldensians and the church were primarily disciplinary, but from that point on, they increasingly diverged from Rome doctrinally as well.

=== Catholic missions in Languedoc ===
The establishment of the principles of episcopal inquisition in 1184 had almost no immediate consequences in Languedoc. The local bishops were mainly interested in the income from their dioceses, some of which (especially Toulouse) were in financial trouble, rather than their pastoral duties. The situation changed with the pontificate of Innocent III (1198–1216), who dismissed several bishops and appointed new ones (e.g., he replaced Archbishop Berengar of Narbonne in 1212 with Papal Legate Arnaud Amalric) and sent Cistercian missions to Languedoc to convert heretics. From 1205, Dominic de Guzmán, the founder of the Dominican Order, also worked in the Toulouse area with the same purpose, although his order was formally approved only by the next pope, Honorius III, in 1216. In 1208, a group of Waldensians led by Durand of Huesca submitted to the church, founding a community of "poor Catholics".

=== Episcopal inquisition in Champagne (1197–1208) ===
In northern France, several bishops took inquisitorial action against the Cathars. Between 1197 and 1208, numerous trials took place in Champagne, resulting in the burning of several people. The most active in combating heresy was Bishop Hugo of Auxerre.

=== Crusades against the Cathars (1209–1229) ===
In 1208, a knight of Count Raymond VI of Toulouse murdered Papal Legate Pierre de Castelnau. Pope Innocent III, who had already accused the count of supporting heresy, took this as a provocation and declared a crusade against the Cathars. Crusader armies, led by Simon de Montfort, committed numerous massacres, the most infamous being the Massacre at Béziers in 1209. In 1215, Innocent III recognized Simon as the ruler of Toulouse, but Simon was killed during the siege of Toulouse in 1218. The crusade, formally aimed at fighting heretics, effectively turned into a struggle for control over southern France.

After Simon's death, Count Raymond VI (died 1222) regained control over Languedoc for a few years. A second "crusade" in 1219 ended in failure. However, in 1226, another campaign was organized, led by King Louis VIII of France. Although the king died during the expedition, his forces continued the conquest. Ultimately, in 1229, a peace treaty was signed in Paris, under which the new Count Raymond VII renounced a large part of his lands in favor of the king or the church, with the remaining portion to pass to Alphonse, brother of King Louis IX, upon Raymond's death. The count also pledged to combat heretics. That same year, a synod was held in Toulouse, presided over by Bishop Folquet de Marselha and Papal Legate Cardinal Romano Bonaventura. Many witnesses and suspects of heresy were interrogated during the sessions, and detailed regulations for dealing with heretics were enacted. All the suspects confessed and renounced heresy before the bishop and the legate, and as penance, they had to wear two penitential crosses on their clothing.

=== Repression from 1229 to 1233 ===
In the following years, repression continued. Local feudal lords became much more involved in pursuing heretics. Several armed expeditions by the count and his vassals after 1229 are recorded in sources, resulting in the capture and burning of Cathar Perfects, including the execution of one of the main Cathar leaders from Agenais, Vigouroux de la Bacone, in Toulouse in 1233. The new (since 1232) Bishop of Toulouse, Raymond of Fauga, was from the Dominican Order. In 1233, Pope Gregory IX decided to introduce a new repressive instrument in France to support the previously ineffective episcopal courts. In April 1233, he sent a letter to the French bishops informing them of the assignment of the task of combating heresy to the Dominicans, instructing the provincial superior of the Dominicans in Toulouse to select several monks for this task. In northern France, the pope personally appointed Robert le Bougre from the Dominican convent in Besançon as papal inquisitor for the metropolises of Sens, Rouen, Bourges, and Tours, as well as the County of Flanders. Thus, France came under the activity of papal inquisitors.

== 1233–1330 ==
=== Languedoc ===
==== Beginnings of the inquisition in Languedoc (1234–1242) ====
In January 1234, Romeu de Llivia, the Dominican provincial superior of Provence, appointed the prior of Toulouse, Pons of St. Gilles, along with Peter Cell and William Arnold as inquisitors for the dioceses of Toulouse and Cahors. A month later, Papal Legate John of Bernin, Archbishop of Vienne, appointed another Dominican, Arnold the Catalan, as inquisitor for the Diocese of Albi. These inquisitors promptly began their work. Initially, they supported the inquisitorial activities of Bishop Raymond in Toulouse but took the initiative in other areas such as Albi, Moissac, and Cahors. However, most of the early verdicts were in absentia condemnations of those who did not appear upon summons and the deceased heretics, as the Cathars still had strongholds like Montségur where the inquisitors could not reach. The practice of exhuming and burning the bones of the deceased caused significant outrage, such as the expulsion of Arnold the Catalan from Albi in 1234 after he ordered the exhumation of a woman's remains from the local cemetery.

On Good Friday in 1235, many people in Toulouse voluntarily approached the inquisitors to testify about heretics. This information led to an expanded investigation in the Diocese of Carcassonne and summons of 12 respected citizens in Toulouse, who refused to appear. The city authorities supported them and expelled the Dominicans from Toulouse in autumn 1235. Pope Gregory IX intervened, and the Dominicans returned in 1236. John of Bernin appointed another inquisitor, the Franciscan Stephen of Narbonne.

In 1236, Raymond Gros, a senior Cathar Perfect, unexpectedly surrendered to the inquisitors in Toulouse and provided extensive testimonies implicating many individuals. Over the next two years, based on his testimonies, the remains of dozens of deceased Cathars were exhumed and burned, and many living ones were condemned, mostly in absentia. In 1238, under pressure from Count Raymond VII, who was antagonistic toward the Dominicans, Gregory IX agreed to suspend the inquisition in Toulouse. The count's support was needed by the pope in his dispute with Emperor Frederick II. The suspension lasted until 1241 when William Arnold and Stephen of Narbonne resumed their activities around Montauban. This time, over 700 heretics voluntarily came forward and confessed in exchange for leniency. However, Cathars who did not surrender felt threatened and decided to counteract the inquisition. In May 1242, the inquisitors were treacherously murdered at Avignonet castle by knights belonging to the Cathar sect, who then sought refuge at Montségur, the main Cathar stronghold.

==== Mass investigations (1242–1248) ====
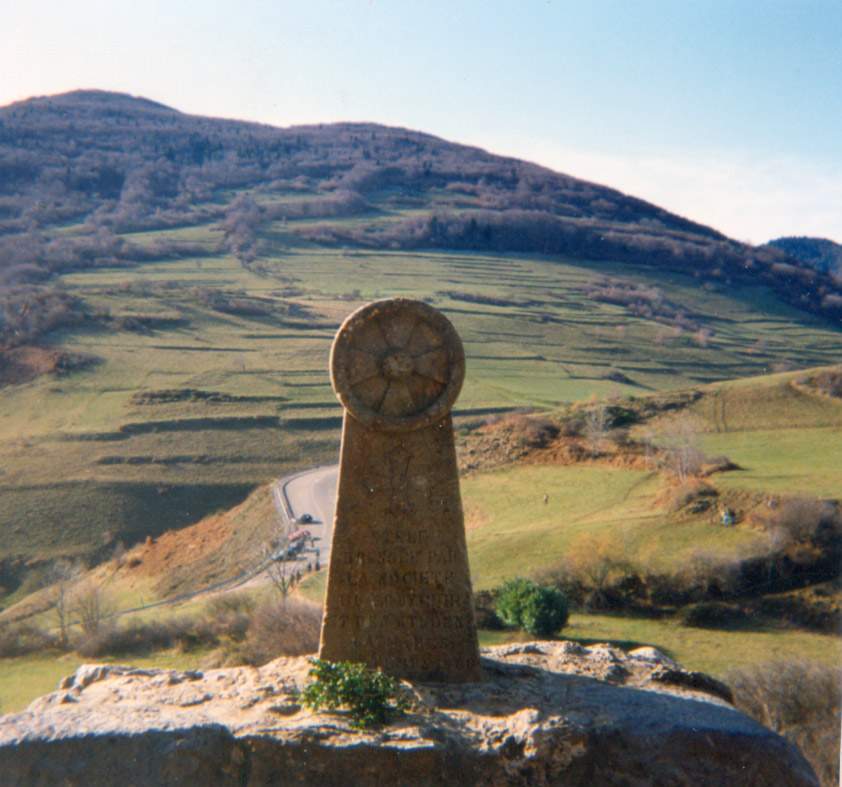
Monument commemorating the mass execution of the Cathars at Montségur in 1244

The murder of the inquisitors backfired significantly. Investigations resumed in December 1242 under the leadership of the uncompromising Dominican Ferrier, who had been an episcopal inquisitor in the Archdiocese of Narbonne since 1229. The synod of Narbonne in 1243 refined inquisitorial procedures. A military expedition led by the Archbishop of Narbonne resulted in the capture of Montségur in March 1244. Around 210 Perfects, including the Cathar Bishop of Toulouse Bertrand Marty, were captured and burned at the stake for refusing to convert to Catholicism.

The fall of Montségur and the destruction of the Cathar elite marked the end of their stronghold in Languedoc. The inquisition intensified, encompassing nearly the entire Languedoc society. The long coexistence of Catholics, Cathars, and Waldensians meant almost everyone had some knowledge of heretics, which they were obliged to share with the inquisitors. After the Avignonet murders, inquisitors slightly changed their modus operandi. Instead of personally visiting areas under their jurisdiction, the synod of Narbonne established permanent tribunals in Carcassonne and Toulouse. While field visits continued, summoning suspects and witnesses to the tribunal's headquarters for interrogation became the norm. From 1243 to 1248, Dominican inquisitors conducted large-scale investigations across Languedoc, likely interrogating all adult residents in many localities (men over 14 and women over 12). These investigations were quite successful, as nearly all suspects who appeared before the inquisition renounced heresy. As penance, they were sentenced to imprisonment, pilgrimages, or wearing penitential crosses on their clothing. However, many judgments were still in absentia. Due to numerous appeals to Pope Innocent IV and bishops, the sentences declared by inquisitors were often further mitigated. In protest against these mitigations, the Dominicans resigned from inquisitorial activities in Languedoc at the turn of 1248 and 1249.

==== Episcopal inquisition (1249–1255) ====
The resignation of the Dominicans did not halt the repression of heretics. The inquisitorial activities were continued (personally or through appointed officials) by the Archbishop of Narbonne and the bishops of Toulouse, Albi, Rodez, Cahors, and Carcassonne. Secular authorities were also heavily involved, often acting more ruthlessly than the church courts. In 1249, Count Raymond VII burned 80 Cathars in Agen, despite their voluntary confessions and willingness to convert. His successor, Alphonse of Poitiers, sent many heretics to the stake, whom church courts had only sentenced to imprisonment. The repressions from 1249 to about 1255 proved to be even harsher than those led by papal inquisitors between 1244 and 1248. The last Cathar stronghold, Château de Quéribus, much smaller and less significant than Montségur, was captured by the seneschal of Carcassonne in 1255.

==== Restoration of the Dominican inquisition ====
The papal inquisition was restored in Languedoc after the death of Innocent IV on 7 December 1254. At the beginning of 1255, the Paris provincial of the Dominicans, under orders from Pope Alexander IV, appointed two inquisitors for the Toulouse region, and in 1259, two more Dominicans became inquisitors in Carcassonne. The Languedoc tribunals were thus subordinated to the Paris provincial of the Dominicans, who since 1253 had the authority to appoint and dismiss inquisitors in the Kingdom of France.

==== Accusations of abuse ====
In subsequent years, the inquisition continued its work in Languedoc uninterrupted, enjoying the support of bishops and Count Alphonse of Poitiers. After Alphonse's death in 1271, the County of Toulouse came under the direct rule of the King of France. From then on, the confiscation of property from convicted heretics primarily benefited the crown. In 1279, the King of France declared an amnesty for 278 descendants of convicted heretics, guaranteeing the return of confiscated property. Despite this, the inquisitors' practices related to confiscations caused the most controversy in the following years. In the 1280s, public accusations against the inquisitors in Toulouse, Albi, and Carcassonne of fabricating evidence (often through torture) against wealthy residents, particularly the deceased, to allow royal officials to seize their estates, became widespread. The main critic of the Dominican inquisitors was the Franciscan Bernard Délicieux. These accusations intensified with the anti-heretical campaign in Albi in 1299 led by Bishop Bernard Castanet, with active involvement from the inquisitors. Many wealthy citizens of Albi were arrested and tortured. In 1302, under public pressure, the inquisitor of Toulouse, Foulques of St. George, was dismissed. In 1306, due to complaints from Carcassonne and Albi, Pope Clement V appointed a cardinal commission to investigate the charges against Bernard Castanet and the inquisitors. The investigation confirmed the use of torture and inhumane conditions for prisoners, who were kept in chains in dark and damp cells. As a result, Bishop Bernard Castanet was transferred to the less significant Diocese of Le Puy. However, the suspects were not released, with some remaining in prison for many years, although the cardinals enforced improvements in their conditions. The abuses confirmed by the cardinals prompted the decrees of the Council of Vienne in 1312, which limited the independence of the inquisitors. From then on, certain actions, such as the use of torture, had to be consulted with the local bishop. Ultimately, the long-standing battle between the Dominican inquisitors and their opponents in Languedoc ended in favor of the former. In 1316, the new Pope John XXII provided decisive support to the inquisitors. In 1319, the citizens of Albi, Carcassonne, and Cordes had to submit to the inquisitors, which took the form of humiliating, collective penance ceremonies. Bernard Délicieux died in 1319 in the papal prison in Avignon.

==== Revival and ultimate eradication of Catharism ====
The early 14th century saw a resurgence of heresy in southern France. The Cathar Perfect Peire Autier achieved great success in gaining new followers and managed to avoid arrest for many years. The centers of faithful were mainly in remote Pyrenean villages like Montaillou. However, the combined efforts of the Toulouse inquisitor Bernard Gui (1307–1323), the Carcassonne inquisitor Geoffroy d'Ablis (1303–1316), and the Bishop of Pamiers Jacques Fournier eventually suppressed this movement. Peire Autier was burned at the stake in 1310, and in 1321, Guillaume Bélibaste, the last Cathar Perfect in Languedoc, was executed by burning on the orders of the Archbishop of Narbonne, Bernard de Farges. Languedoc inquisitors continued to capture the remaining Cathar followers until around 1330.

==== Spiritual Franciscans ====
In the 1320s, the main target of the inquisition became the heretical wing of the Franciscan order known as the Spiritual Franciscans or Beguins, condemned by Pope John XXII in 1317. About a hundred Beguins were burned at the stake in Languedoc between 1319 and 1330 by inquisitorial and episcopal courts.

By around 1330, all major heretical movements in Languedoc had been eradicated, and from that time on, the activities of the inquisition in this region did not show any significant differences from those in the rest of the French monarchy.

=== Northern France ===
==== Robert le Bougre ====
In Northern France, the first inquisitor was the Dominican Robert le Bougre, appointed in April 1233. However, his nomination was protested by Archbishop Walter Cornuti of Sens, as Robert was to be subject only to the Dominican provincial in Paris. Under pressure from Walter and other bishops, Pope Gregory IX revoked Robert’s inquisitorial authority in February 1234. Nevertheless, influenced by Robert's reports of heretics in Northern France, the pope reversed his decision. In August 1235, Robert le Bougre was appointed as the inquisitor general of France. He quickly became known as a zealous and strict inquisitor. In Northern Champagne and Flanders, he burned 60 heretics within 3 months in 1236. In 1239, he presided over a mass trial of several hundred heretics from 16 different dioceses, resulting in over 180 people, including a Cathar bishop, being burned at the stake in Montwimer. Robert’s activities likely led to the destruction of the Cathar church structures in Northern France and the physical elimination of the sect's elite. Robert remained in the inquisitorial office until at least 1244 but was later dismissed and imprisoned for disobedience to the order’s authorities.

==== 1253–1330 ====
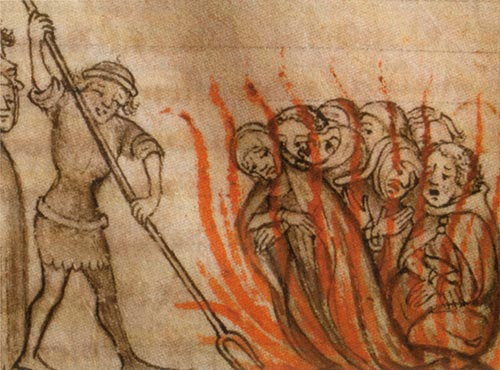
Burning of the Knights Templar in 1314

After Robert le Bougre’s dismissal, little is known about the inquisition's activities in Northern France. In 1253, Pope Innocent IV granted the Dominican provincial of Paris the right to appoint and dismiss inquisitors in the Kingdom of France. A few documentary references indicate that such appointments were indeed made, for instance, the Dominican Simon Duval is recorded as the inquisitor of France between 1277 and 1278. In the early 14th century, William of Paris, the confessor of King Philip IV, was the inquisitor general of France. He played a significant role in the initial phase of the Knights Templar trials, legitimizing the king's actions against the order by supporting the accusations of heresy. Additionally, in 1310, he presided over the trial of the mystic Marguerite Porete, who was burned at the stake as the first victim accused of the “heresy of the Free Spirit”, later condemned by the Council of Vienne in 1312. In 1323, a trial of two necromancers and the clergy who employed them took place in Paris.

There is no clear evidence of division into inquisitorial districts in Northern France. The area was generally under the jurisdiction of the inquisitor general in Paris, with inquisitors for smaller districts appointed only as needed. In the first half of the 14th century, a separate inquisitor for the metropolitan area of Tours was regularly designated.

=== Provence ===
The French-speaking areas east of the Rhône until 1349 were part of the Holy Roman Empire, but not the Kingdom of France, with the coast under the Kingdom of Naples. However, ecclesiastically, these lands were always considered part of Gaul. An independent, permanent tribunal for these areas, based in Marseille, was established by Pope Nicholas IV in 1288, although a Franciscan named Maurin is documented as an inquisitor in the region as early as 1264. Provence became the only French inquisitorial district assigned to the Franciscans rather than the Dominicans. Before 1330, little is known about the activities of the Franciscan inquisitors in this region, despite it being a major center of the Waldensian sect. The most notable event was the trial of 25 Franciscan Spirituals (Beguins), members of a dissident wing of the order, in Marseille in 1318. Four of them were burned at the stake, becoming the first martyrs of this movement. The sentence was passed by the Franciscan Michel Le Moine.

In 1321, Inquisitor Jacques Bernard tasked two of his deputies with investigating the Waldensians in Valence. Both were killed by the Waldensians, halting the persecution for a time. Repressions against this religious group resumed only after 1335.

=== Burgundy-Lorraine ===
==== Unsuccessful beginnings (1247–1255) ====
In 1247, Pope Innocent IV instructed the prior of the Dominican convent in Besançon to select several monks as inquisitors in the Burgundy and Lorraine regions to combat the Waldensian sect. This initiative failed as John, Count of Chalon, acting as regent of the County of Burgundy, did not provide the promised financial support for the new tribunal. As a result, in 1255, the Dominicans from Besançon requested to be relieved from this task, and Pope Alexander IV granted their request.

==== 1290–1330 ====
The reorganization of the inquisitorial tribunal in these regions occurred in 1290 when Pope Nicholas IV created a new inquisitorial province comprising the Archdiocese of Besançon and the dioceses of Metz, Verdun, Toul, Sion, as well as Lausanne and Geneva. Inquisitors in this province, no more than three in number, were to be appointed by the prior of the French (Parisian) Dominican province, even though these areas belonged to the Empire, not the Kingdom of France.

Evidence of inquisitorial activity in Burgundy and Lorraine at the turn of the 13th and 14th centuries is very sparse. It is not even known how many inquisitors actually operated in this area. Testimonies from Waldensians interrogated in 1320 by the Toulouse inquisitor Bernard Gui indicate that members of this community were persecuted in Burgundy, but these accounts do not provide much information about the scale or details of these repressions.

== Period from circa 1330 to the mid-16th century ==
=== Kingdom of France ===
==== Decline of inquisition activity after 1330 ====
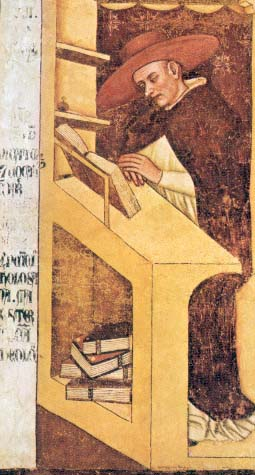
Dominican Jean de Moulins, before becoming a cardinal in 1350, was the inquisitor of Toulouse from 1344 to 1348

Around 1330, the activity of the Dominican inquisition in the Kingdom of France significantly declined. In Languedoc, the Cathar sect was completely exterminated. Sporadic trials of Waldensians and Beguines occurred in this region until the late 1340s, but these movements were eventually eliminated. Public sermones fidei (ceremonies announcing the inquisition's verdicts) were recorded in this area throughout the rest of the 14th century only in 1337 (Toulouse), 1347 (Toulouse and Carcassonne), 1357 (Carcassonne), 1374 (Toulouse), and 1383 (Carcassonne). In the north, sporadic trials of alleged adherents of the so-called "heresy of the Free Spirit" took place, but they were much rarer than, for example, in Germany. Moreover, from 1332, there was a gradual dependency of the inquisition on the Parlement of Paris. In the second half of the 15th century, the Parlement of Paris became the superior court to the inquisition and could intervene in its activities, also acting as a court of second instance. The collaboration between the Parlement of Paris and the theological faculty of the Sorbonne provided competent personnel for handling heresy cases. In Languedoc, from the mid-15th century, the Parlement of Toulouse played a similar role concerning the inquisitorial tribunals in Toulouse and Carcassonne.

==== Episcopal inquisition activity in the north ====
Several significant heresy trials in the 15th century took place before episcopal courts. In 1411, Bishop of Cambrai Pierre d’Ailly investigated the sect called homines intelligentiæ in Brussels. In 1431, Joan of Arc was tried before the tribunal of Bishop Pierre Cauchon in Rouen and was burned at the stake. Twenty-five years later, she was posthumously rehabilitated by Pope Callixtus III after a reinvestigation led by Inquisitor Jean Bréhal.

==== Crisis in the 15th-16th century ====
Pope Nicholas V tried to counteract the decline of the inquisition's importance in France. In 1451, he granted the inquisitor of Toulouse, Hugh le Noir, a range of extraordinary powers and extended his jurisdiction to the entire Kingdom of France. However, this decree largely remained theoretical. Even Nicholas V and his successors did not always adhere to it, as evidenced by the documentation of other independent inquisitors in France as early as 1451/1452. The number of inquisitorial appointments in the second half of the 15th century even increased, but this was due to the transformation of the role into an honorary distinction rather than an intensification of anti-heretical activities. Alongside the permanent tribunals in Toulouse, Carcassonne, and Paris, tribunals were established (permanently or temporarily) in cities such as Lyon, Cambrai, Tournai, Rouen, Bourges, and Bordeaux.

The internal situation within the Dominican order also played a role, particularly the emergence of reformed, so-called observant congregations, which were exempt from the authority of the provincials. In northern France, the Dutch Congregation began to operate around the mid-15th century, setting up inquisitorial tribunals in the southern Netherlands, previously under the direct jurisdiction of the inquisitor general in Paris. In the south, the French Observant Congregation claimed the right to staff the tribunals in Toulouse and Carcassonne, leading to factional disputes among the Dominicans and competition for inquisitorial positions. The struggle for the position of the inquisitor of Toulouse was especially intense between 1531 and 1538. During this time, inquisitorial appointments required approval by the king and the parlements in Paris and Toulouse (depending on the tribunal's location).

==== Witch trials ====
Despite the general decline in the inquisition's activity and importance in France in the 15th century, some French inquisitors were involved in witch hunts. However, the evidence is scarce, as few trial records from this period have survived, and some trials are known only from narrative sources or theological treatises. The Dominican theologian Johannes Nider, writing in 1437, mentioned witch trials in the Diocese of Autun, conducted by a Dominican inquisitor from Lyon, without specifying the exact dates or details. Spanish Franciscan Alonso de Espina in 1459 alluded to witches burned for participating in sabbaths by the tribunal in Toulouse, without providing further details. Jean Vineti, inquisitor of Carcassonne from 1451, wrote a theological treatise arguing for the reality of witchcraft crimes, but nothing is known about his practical activities. Better documented are witch trials in the north led by the deputies of the inquisitor general Roland le Cozic, such as the trial in Évreux in 1453 or the trials in Arras between 1459 and 1462. In the latter, 12 out of 34 accused were burned, with many suspects brutally tortured. These actions provoked strong protests and were interrupted by the intervention of the bishop of Arras, the Parlement of Paris, and inquisitor Jean Bréhal. In 1491, the Parlement of Paris rehabilitated all the condemned.

==== Scandals in Toulouse (1532–1538) ====
In the 1520s, Lutheran ideas began to spread in France, but the main burden of combating them was taken up by the parlements, not the papal inquisitors, some of whom were humanists open to new intellectual currents. In 1532, the Parlement of Toulouse ordered the arrest of 55 people, mostly associated with the University of Toulouse, suspected of Lutheranism. Most fled, but 23 were captured and tried, with one burned at the stake. The then-inquisitor of Toulouse, Arnaud de Badet, refused to participate in the trial, and it soon emerged that some of the arrested were his friends. Consequently, the parlement accused the inquisitor of favoring heretics, leading to his resignation in 1536. His successor, Louis de Rochette, was embroiled in an even greater scandal. In 1538, the Parlement of Toulouse arrested him for heresy and, after a swift trial, sentenced him to be burned at the stake. The charges against Rochette were likely a drastic manifestation of internal factional rivalry over the position of the inquisitor of Toulouse, with one of his accusers being his successor, Vidal de Becanis.

==== Marginalization of the inquisition ====
The scandals shaking the inquisition in Languedoc led to King Francis I formally transferring heresy cases to the jurisdiction of the parlements in 1539, marginalizing the inquisitors who, while retaining some autonomy (especially in trials against clergy), effectively became mere theological advisors to the parliamentary courts. In northern France, this process occurred even earlier, as in 1525, with the consent of Pope Clement VII, a special commission for combating heresy was created within the Parlement of Paris. Practically all heresy trials in northern France during the Reformation were conducted by parliamentary courts, with only auxiliary participation from the inquisitor. The last inquisitor general appointed under the old rules was Dominican Mathieu d’Ory, who died in 1557.

=== Provence ===
==== Persecution of the Waldensians ====
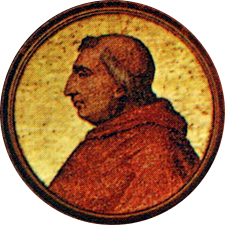
Pope Innocent VIII, initiator of the crusade against the Waldensians in 1487

After the extermination of the Cathars, the only substantial dissident movement in the French-speaking territories was the Waldensians, primarily residing in the Dauphiné, especially in the Alpine valleys of Valpute, Argentiere, Valculson, and Freyssiniere. These areas, since 1288, were part of the inquisitorial province of Provence, entrusted to the Franciscans. However, for a long time, the Waldensians were not significantly troubled by the Inquisition, especially after two deputies of the inquisitor Jacques Bernard were killed by them in 1321. In 1335, Pope Benedict XII demanded intensified repression. Since the Waldensians lived in mountainous regions where they formed tight-knit communities and did not hesitate to use violence in their defense, inquisitors had to seek help from secular authorities and organize armed expeditions against their settlements. The effectiveness of these actions was low, as the Waldensians usually hid in the mountains, and few were captured by the inquisitors. These expeditions often ended with the exhumation and burning of heretics' remains from local cemeteries and the confiscation of modest property left in the valleys by the Waldensians. Captured heretics generally declared conversion to Catholicism, but after the troops and inquisitor left, they returned to heresy, which meant death by burning at the stake if they were prosecuted again. Executions of Waldensians took place in 1347 in Qirieu and in 1348 in Embrun. From 1352 to 1363, when Guillaume de Bordes served as Archbishop of Embrun, inquisitorial activity against the Waldensians almost ceased, as the archbishop adopted a strategy of converting them through pastoral work rather than repression. During this time, the inquisitors mainly dealt with suspicions of false conversions among Provençal Jews to Christianity. However, after the death of Archbishop Guillaume de Bordes in 1363, the repressive approach towards the Waldensians resurfaced. In 1366, several Waldensians were burned at the stake, and their properties were confiscated. In 1371, François Borel became the inquisitor of Provence, gaining a particularly bad reputation among locals. In 1380, he issued death sentences in absentia for 169 people and led many armed expeditions until 1393 to capture and execute the condemned. Many captured complied with the church and were only fined. The rest were burned at the stake, and their properties confiscated.

After 1393, the persecution of the Waldensians ceased for a time. It is possible that church authorities believed that through Borel's actions and later missionary work by Vincent Ferrer (1399–1403), they had forced all to convert and eliminated the resistant ones. This might be inferred from the appointment letter for inquisitor Ponce Feugeyron in 1409, where Alexander V lists several offenses for the new inquisitor to address but does not mention the Waldensians. If this was their belief, they were soon proven wrong. In 1432, inquisitor Pierre Fabre wrote to the Council of Basel that he had just imprisoned six Waldensians who identified over 500 fellow believers in the Alpine valleys. However, there is no indication that attempts were made to arrest the other suspects. The next reports of Waldensian persecution come from 1475. The decline in the importance and authority of the Inquisition at this time is evidenced by the fact that the Waldensians successfully appealed to King Louis XI. A royal ordinance on 18 May 1478 declared that the residents of the Alpine valleys were good Catholics and prohibited royal officials from assisting the inquisitors in persecuting them. Protests from Pope Sixtus IV were to no avail. Only the death of Louis XI in 1483 allowed the resumption of repression. In 1486, Archbishop of Embrun, Jean Bayle, called on all Waldensians from the valleys of Valpute, Argentiere, Valculson, and Freyssiniere to submit to the church or leave these lands. They ignored this call. In response, Pope Innocent VIII proclaimed a crusade. It was organized in 1488, led by the Archdeacon of Cremona, Alberto Cattaneo, and the Count of Saint-Paul-de-Varax, Hugo de La Palu. The Parlement of Grenoble officially supported the crusade. The armed expedition failed against the guerrilla forces near Prali, turning into a bloody pacification of Waldensian settlements. About 160 people were murdered, accounting for 1/10 of the Waldensian population, but most managed to seek refuge in the mountains. In 1489, the troops left the Dauphiné, failing to achieve their goals.

In 1509, the Waldensians obtained from King Louis XII and the church authorities the rehabilitation of those murdered during the 1488–1489 crusade and the annulment of the confiscations made then. Although it was acknowledged that the deceased were heretics, they were not given a chance to convert, making it impossible to consider their executions and property confiscations as lawful.

==== Witch trials ====
The areas under the jurisdiction of Provençal inquisitors (Dauphiné, Aosta Valley) also became the scene of some of the earliest witch hunts in European history. As early as 1409, Pope Alexander V mentioned a supposedly new sect of sorcerers in the Alps in a letter to inquisitor Ponce Feugeyron. Although the major witch hunts in the Dauphiné between 1428 and 1447 were conducted by secular courts, especially Judge Claude Tholosan, trials for these offenses also took place before inquisitors or episcopal officials. One of the most famous is the trial of Pierre Valin, sentenced to death by the inquisitorial tribunal in La Tour-du-Pin in 1438.

==== Jean de Roma ====
The decisions made in 1509 did not favor further inquisitorial activities against the Waldensians. However, in 1528, the Dominican Jean de Roma (died 1533) became the inquisitor in this area. Initially supported by the Parlement of Aix-en-Provence, in 1532, he resumed the persecution of the Waldensians and in February 1533 sentenced 7 of them to be burned. However, shortly afterward, he was summoned by the parlement to respond to complaints about the cruel torture of suspects. His activities were suspended, and he soon died from the plague. His death marked the end of the Inquisition's history in those parts of the Provençal province belonging to the Kingdom of France. This did not mean the end of repression against the Waldensians. In 1545, by order of the Parlement of Aix-en-Provence, a bloody pacification of Waldensian villages in Provence took place. In papal Avignon, a tribunal of the reformed Roman Inquisition was established in 1541, led by the Dominicans, which conducted very intensive activities against suspected Protestants in the 16th century.

=== Burgundy-Lorraine ===
==== 14th century ====
The activities of the Inquisition in the inquisitorial province of Besançon (Burgundy and Lorraine) during the 14th century are among the least documented. It is unclear whether there was one inquisitor or several. In 1356, Dominican Jean de Fontaine, titled as the Inquisitor of Lorraine, was dismissed by the general chapter of the Dominican Order. The names of several other inquisitors from this area are also known, including one (Martin d'Amance) who even became a bishop, but sources do not provide information about trials against heretics. It was only in 1399 that proceedings against the Waldensians took place in the Diocese of Lausanne.

==== Ulric de Torrenté ====
Inquisitorial activity in the Burgundy-Lorraine province intensified in the 1420s, particularly with witch trials. Appointed in 1424, inquisitor Ulric de Torrenté from the Lausanne convent, whose jurisdiction covered the entire province, was one of the co-authors of the first major witch hunt in history. This took place in the Diocese of Sion (southwestern Switzerland) between 1427 and 1436 and claimed several hundred victims. Until recently, this witch hunt was considered solely the work of secular judges. However, the discovery of new documentation revealed that some trials in 1428 were conducted under the direction of inquisitor Ulric de Torrenté. The same inquisitor led trials against the Waldensians in Fribourg between 1429 and 1430, and again conducted witch trials in Lausanne and Neuchâtel between 1438 and 1439.

==== Division of the province into smaller districts ====
Around the mid-15th century, the province was definitively divided into smaller inquisitorial districts. Initially, there were probably three districts: Lorraine (including the dioceses of Metz, Toul, and Verdun), the archdiocese of Besançon, and the Franco-Swiss district, including the dioceses of Lausanne, Sion, and Geneva, with the main center initially in Lausanne and after 1476 in Geneva. Some of these districts later underwent further subdivisions. In the 1520s, each of the three Lorraine dioceses had its own inquisitor. Between 1472 and 1476, the Diocese of Geneva constituted an independent inquisitorial district, separate from the tribunal in Lausanne.

==== Witch trials ====
More information regarding inquisitorial activities has been preserved for the tribunal of the Lausanne-Geneva-Sion district. Throughout the 15th century, witch trials regularly occurred there. These trials usually targeted small groups of suspects, with no witch hunts on a scale comparable to the 1427–1436 period. There are also scant mentions of witch trials from the other two districts of the Burgundy-Lorraine province, although these come from a slightly later period (late 15th and early 16th centuries).

==== Reformation period ====
In the 1520s, the first trials against supporters of the Reformation took place in Lorraine and Franche-Comté, involving inquisitors. However, by 1534, the parlement of Franche-Comté stripped ecclesiastical courts (both bishops and inquisitors) of jurisdiction over heresy cases. The office of the inquisitor in Besançon survived but became purely honorary. In Geneva, the Inquisition lasted only until the dissolution of Dominican monasteries during the Reformation. The last inquisitor in Lorraine, Jean Beguinet, died in 1558.

== 16th–18th century ==
=== Attempts to reform the inquisition in 1557 ===
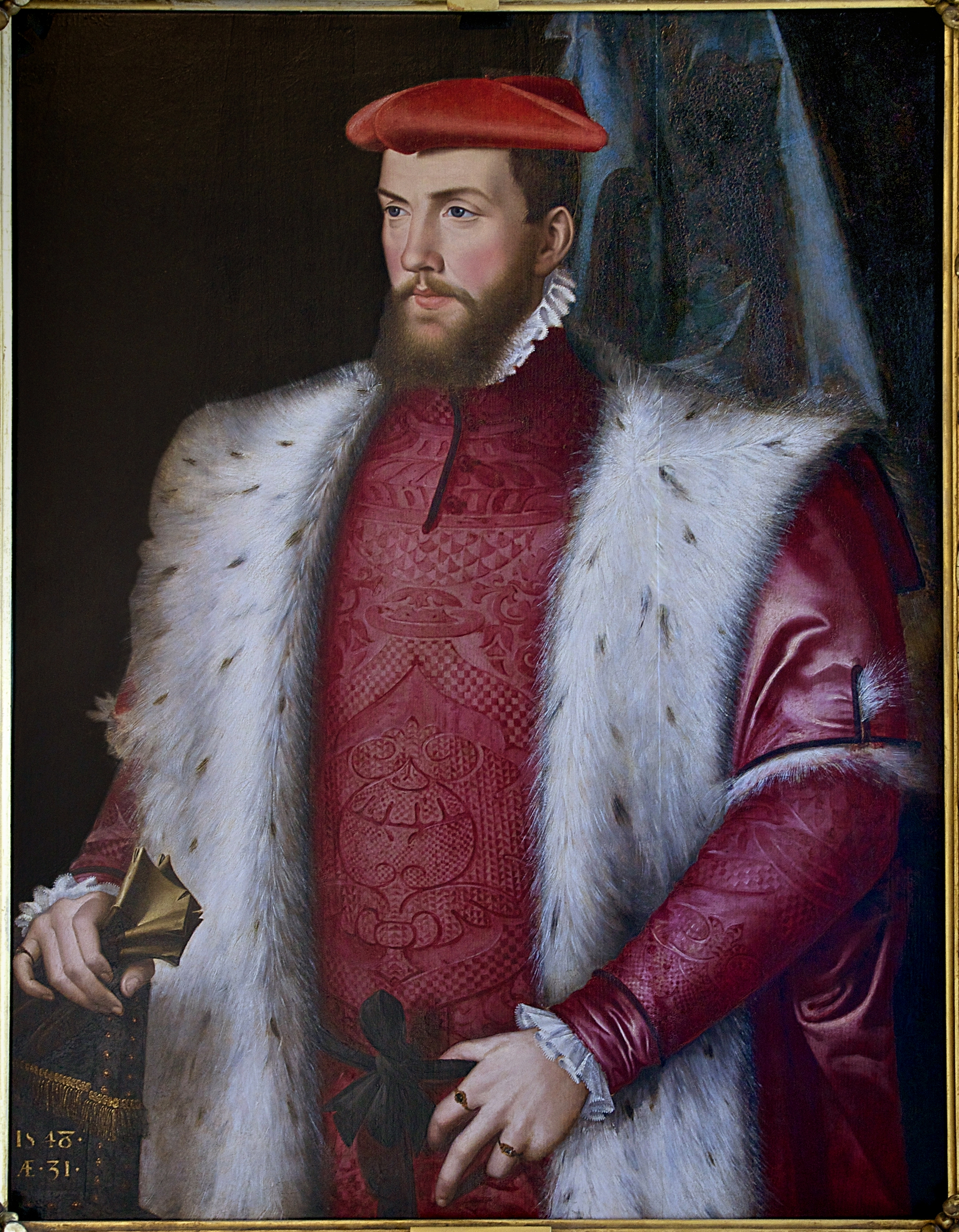
Cardinal Odet de Coligny, appointed one of the general inquisitors in 1557, converted to Calvinism in 1561

Despite the repression of Protestants by local parlements, the Reformation continued to gain more supporters in France, who, with support from Geneva, became increasingly organized. These supporters were known as Huguenots. Seeking new tools to combat Protestantism, King Henry II of France wanted to establish an inquisition in France similar to the Spanish model, i.e., as an organized state-church institution. Pope Paul IV agreed and in 1557 appointed three general inquisitors of France to organize the new tribunal. These were the French cardinals Odet de Coligny, Charles de Lorraine, and Charles de Bourbon. However, the project ended in complete failure as the Parlement of Paris did not approve it, and after the death of Henry II in 1559, it had no further development. Furthermore, in 1561, Cardinal Odet de Coligny, one of the general inquisitors, officially converted to Calvinism and joined the Huguenots. A decree by Regent Catherine de' Medici in 1560 removed heresy from the list of crimes, effectively ending judicial repression for heresy (though it briefly resumed between 1568 and 1570, as well as between 1585 and 1589). In 1562, religious wars between Catholics and Huguenots broke out in France, lasting intermittently until 1598. During these wars, many acts of violence and extralegal repression occurred on both sides. The most famous of these was the St. Bartholomew's Day massacre in 1572, when Catholics in Paris killed about 2,000 Huguenots. The culmination of these wars was the Edict of Nantes in 1598, which guaranteed the Huguenots freedom of worship.

=== Roman Inquisition ===
The establishment of the Congregation of the Roman and Universal Inquisition in 1542 by Pope Paul III as the central supervisory organ of papal inquisitors initially did not directly impact the situation of papal inquisitorial tribunals in France, especially since even in Italy, some tribunals retained significant autonomy in relation to the congregation for many years. Only in the papal territory of Avignon was a tribunal of the new Roman Inquisition established in 1541, which conducted very intensive activity against supporters of the Reformation throughout the 16th century. Nonetheless, by the end of the century, the congregation managed to more or less subordinate all local tribunals to itself. French tribunals in Toulouse and Carcassonne, as well as the tribunal in Besançon in the imperial County of Burgundy around 1600, could also be considered part of the so-called Roman Inquisition structures.

=== Abolition of the inquisition in France ===
Inquisitors in Toulouse and Carcassonne were appointed until the end of the 17th century, but these appointments were purely honorary. They conducted almost no active inquisitorial activity, as their functions were taken over by the Parlement of Toulouse, which, for instance, in 1619 sentenced atheist Lucilio Vanini to the stake. The last inquisitor of Carcassonne, Thomas Vidal, died in 1703, and the last inquisitor of Toulouse, Antonin Massoulié, died in 1706.

In imperial Besançon, the inquisitorial tribunal effectively ceased after the city was occupied by France in 1674, although the last inquisitor, Louis Buhon (died 1713), was allowed to retain the title and associated benefits for life. One of the local inquisitors, Dominican Pierre Symard, played a significant role in witch hunts in Franche-Comté from 1657 to 1659. However, these actions were disapproved of by the Congregation of the Roman and Universal Inquisition, which removed him from his position in 1660, demonstrating the 17th-century French tribunals' dependence on the congregation.

The inquisitorial tribunal in Avignon existed until the city's capture by revolutionary France in 1790.

== Statistics of sentences and executions ==
=== Languedoc ===
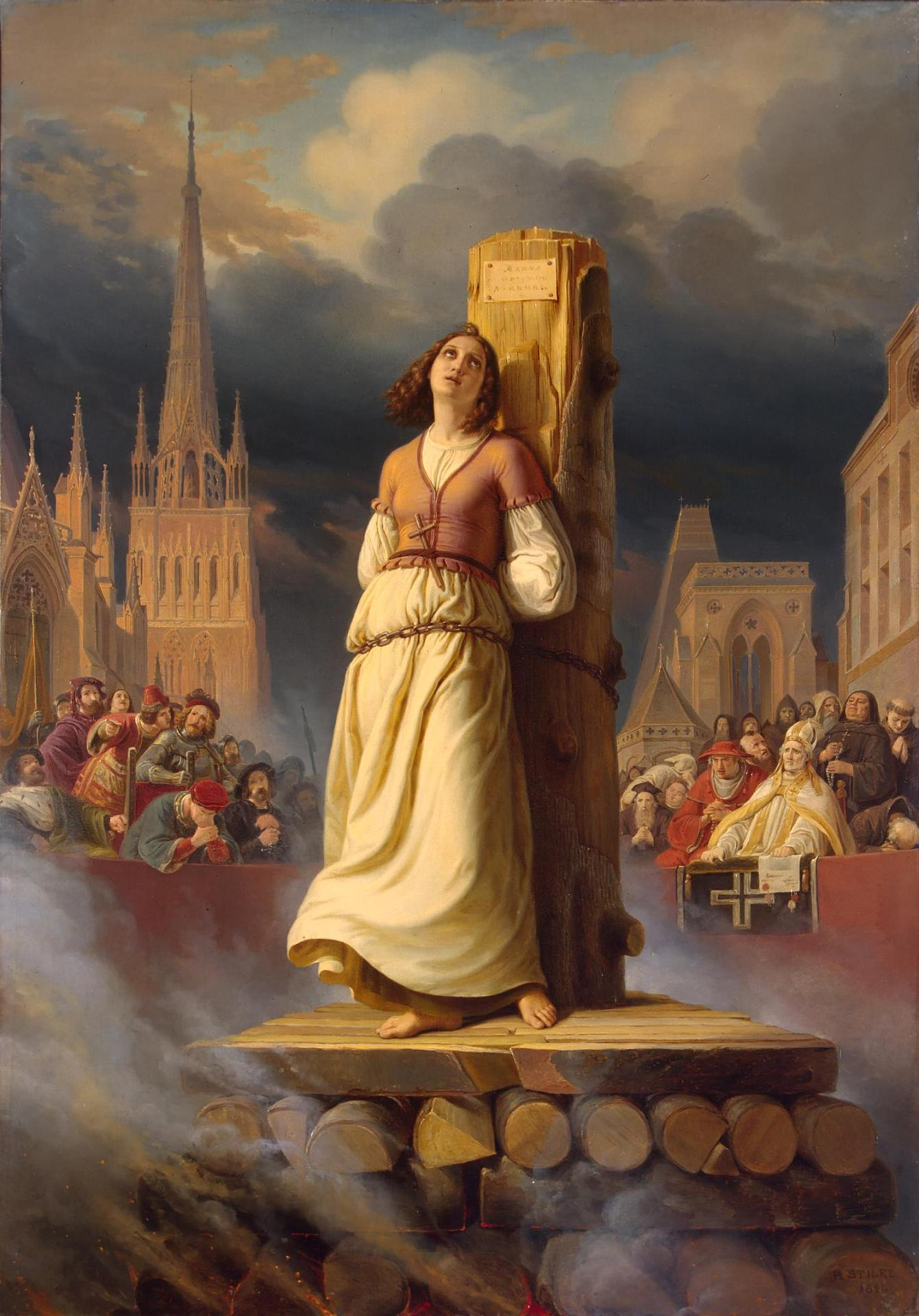
Joan of Arc, sentenced to the stake by Bishop Pierre Cauchon of Beauvais, was rehabilitated by Inquisitor Jean Bréhal

In the early years of the inquisition in Languedoc, due to strong resistance from local communities, most sentences were against deceased heretics, whose bodies were exhumed and burned, and fugitives who were condemned in absentia. Chronicler Guillaume Pelhisson, who was an assistant to Inquisitor Arnold Catalan, mentions only 4 actual executions by Dominican inquisitors between 1234 and 1241, and one by papal legate Jean de Bernin in Albi in 1237. However, he lists over 20 individuals condemned posthumously and more than 40 sentenced in absentia. Many of those condemned in absentia were later captured and burned at Montségur in 1244. Unfortunately, Pelhisson does not provide the number of penitents but suggests it was significant; particularly many people confessed and converted during the "period of grace" in April 1235 and after the conversion of Raymond Gros in 1236. On 19 February 1238, over 20 penitents were sentenced to imprisonment.

Inquisitor Pierre Cella, during an investigation in Quercy between 1241 and 1242, reconciled 724 heretics with the church, imposing various penances on them. Inquisitors Ferrier, Pons Gary, Pierre Durand, and Guillaume Raymond interrogated over 700 suspects between December 1242 and September 1244. Between 1243 and 1245, Bernard de Caux issued 25 sentences of imprisonment and confiscation of goods in Agen and Cahors. Between 1245 and 1246, the same inquisitor conducted a large-scale investigation in the Lauragais and Lavaur regions, covering 39 localities and probably interrogating all adult inhabitants (5,471 people), of which 207 were found guilty of heresy. Among them, 23 were sentenced to imprisonment and 184 to penances. Between 1246 and 1248, inquisitors Bernard de Caux and Jean de Saint-Pierre issued 192 sentences in Toulouse, including 43 in absentia and 149 sentences of imprisonment. In Pamiers, the same inquisitors sentenced 7 people to imprisonment between September 1246 and May 1247, and in Limoux in the county of Foix, they sentenced 156 people to wear penitential crosses.

The Languedoc registers from between 1241 and 1248 do not contain any death sentences, but only part of the documentation has survived. Documents from around 1252 indicate that in the 1240s, inquisitor Ferrier sentenced about 60 heretics from Albi to death and confiscation of goods, though it is uncertain if all these sentences were carried out. Additionally, witness and suspect testimonies interrogated by inquisitors between 1242 and 1246 mention about 70 heretics burned in the 1230s and 1240s, though it is often unclear if these executions were based on inquisitorial sentences or were independently carried out by secular authorities.

Overall, by the mid-13th century, actual executions probably constituted about 1% of all sentences, prison sentences over 10%, and in absentia condemnations up to 25%. Andrea Del Col estimates that over approximately 100 years (1233 to 1330), inquisitors in Languedoc judged from 15 to 20 thousand Cathars.

The most well-documented activity is that of Bernard Gui, inquisitor of Toulouse from 1307 to 1323, as his complete register of sentences (the so-called Liber Sententiarum) has survived. During his inquisitorial career, he issued 633 convicting sentences against 602 individuals (31 were recidivists), including:

- 41 death sentences;
- 40 condemnations of fugitive heretics (in absentia);
- 89 sentences against deceased individuals, including:
  - 66 orders for exhumation and burning of remains;
  - 3 orders for exhumation without burning;
  - 17 declarations that individuals who died before the end of the process would have been sentenced to imprisonment if alive;
  - 3 declarations that they would have been sentenced to the stake;
- 308 prison sentences;
- 136 orders to wear penitential crosses;
- 17 orders for pilgrimages;
- One individual ordered to participate in the next crusade to the Holy Land;
- One case of deferred punishment.

Bernard Gui also issued 274 sentences for mitigation of already imposed penalties on heretics; in 139 cases, he commuted imprisonment to wearing crosses, and in 135 cases, wearing crosses to a pilgrimage. Additionally, 22 orders for the destruction of houses used by heretics for meetings, one condemnation and burning of Jewish writings (including Torah commentaries), and collective penance on the town of Cordes.

In the Carcassonne region between 1322 and 1329, according to incomplete data, papal inquisitors burned 32 people, sentenced 58 to prison, and imposed various penalties (wearing yellow crosses, pilgrimages, etc.) on over 80 others. Additionally, four false witnesses were punished, five heretics were condemned posthumously, six people were acquitted, and 60 sentences involved mitigation of already imposed penalties. In 1347, six Beguines were burned in Toulouse and Carcassonne.

In 1467 in Rouerge, three followers of the schism of Jean Carrier, one of the last supporters of Antipope Benedict XIII from the Great Western Schism, were tried. One was burned, one died during the process, and one was imposed with penance.

Inquisitor Louis Rochette, who was himself burned by the Parlement of Toulouse as a heretic in 1538, conducted an investigation against suspected Lutherans in the Guyenne region in 1536, resulting in fines for 9 individuals. Additionally, Rochette acquitted one official from Agen in 1537 and handed over two other suspects to the Parlement of Bordeaux for further proceedings.

=== Provence ===
Data on sentences issued by Provençal inquisitors is even more fragmentary. In 1318, Inquisitor Michel Le Moine judged 25 Franciscan Spirituals in Marseille, of whom four were sentenced to be burned. In 1348, 12 Waldensians were burned in Embrun, and in 1353, Inquisitor Jean Dumont imposed penalties on seven others. On July 1, 1380, Inquisitor François Borel pronounced death sentences in absentia for 169 people, including 108 from the Valpute Valley, 32 from Argentiere, and 29 from Freyssiniere. It is unknown how many of these were actually carried out; it is confirmed that only six individuals were executed after being captured in 1382.

In the 15th century, around 40 executions by Provençal inquisitors are documented, including 15 in the Italian-speaking Diocese of Aosta, mostly involving individuals accused of witchcraft.

Inquisitor Jean de Roma conducted trials against 150 suspects between 1532 and 1533, sentencing seven to death, with these sentences confirmed by the Parlement of Aix-en-Provence.

=== Northern France ===
The first Dominican inquisitor of France, Robert le Bougre, who was active from 1233 to 1244, gained a particularly notorious reputation. In 1236, Robert burned about 60 people in Champagne and Flanders, and on 13 May 1239, he sent over 180 Cathars to the stake in Montwimer.

After Robert's removal from office, inquisitorial activity in northern France remained very low. In 1310, General Inquisitor William of Paris burned the Beguine Marguerite Porete and a false Jewish convert, sentencing Marguerite's companion to imprisonment. In 1323, one necromancer was burned alive in Paris, the corpse of another who had died in prison was burned, and an unspecified number of clergy who used their services were sentenced to imprisonment. In 1372, Inquisitor Jacques de Morey conducted a trial against two leaders of the sect known as the Company of Poverty, associated with the "Free Spirit heresy". Jeanne Daubeton was burned at the stake along with the remains of her companion who had died in prison. In 1381, the same inquisitor sentenced the Paris provost Hugues Aubriot to prison for allegedly favoring heretics and Jews.

From the 15th century, there are sporadic mentions of inquisitorial witch trials. In 1453, former Sorbonne professor Guillaume Adeline was sentenced to prison for participating in sabbats in Evreux. Isolated executions are noted in Nevers (around 1438) and Langres (1459). One of the largest trials in this region took place in Arras between 1459 and 1460; 34 people were accused of witchcraft and satanism, with 12 burned at the stake.

In 1465, Inquisitor Nicolas Jacquier judged five Waldensians in Lille, sentencing one to death.

=== Burgundy-Lorraine ===
In Burgundy and Lorraine, little is known about inquisitorial activity until the late 14th century. In 1399, proceedings against Waldensians took place in several cities of the Lausanne diocese. In Fribourg, papal inquisitor Humbert Franconis acquitted 53 suspects of belonging to the sect, while in Bern, Bishop-appointed inquisitor Nikolaus von Landau reconciled 130 Waldensians with the Church.

Inquisitor Ulric de Torrenté participated in mass witch trials in the Sion diocese in 1428, resulting in the burning of hundreds of victims according to chroniclers, though exact data is lacking. The same inquisitor burned three Waldensians in Fribourg between 1429 and 1430 and many others were imprisoned. In 1439, two men were burned for heresy in Neuchatel.

Excluding the 1428 trials, at least 35 executions for witchcraft in Burgundy-Lorraine are documented in the 15th and early 16th centuries. In 1525, Metz inquisitor Nicolas Savin burned Jean Castellane, one of the first Protestant martyrs.

=== Documented executions ===
The following list includes only executions of heretics by papal inquisitors in France, excluding those by episcopal courts, parlements, or other secular courts. It includes only cases where sources allow the number of executed individuals to be determined:

| Date | Location | Inquisitorial province | Number of executed | Notes |
|---|---|---|---|---|
| 1234 | Albi | Languedoc | 2 | Cathars Pierre Podiumperditum and Pierre Bomacip burned by Inquisitor Arnold the Catalan |
| 1234 | Toulouse | Languedoc | 1 | Cathar Arnaud Sancier burned by Inquisitor Pons de Saint-Gilles |
| 1235 | Peronne | France | 5 | Heretics burned by Inquisitor Robert le Bougre |
| 1235 | Elincourt | France | 4 | Heretics burned by Inquisitor Robert le Bougre |
| 1236 | Cambrai | France | 21 | Heretics burned by Inquisitor Robert le Bougre |
| 1236 | Douai | France | 10 | Heretics burned by Inquisitor Robert le Bougre |
| 1236 | Lille | France | 20 | Heretics burned by Inquisitor Robert le Bougre |
| 1237 | Albi | Languedoc | 1 | Cathar Arnold Giffre burned by papal legate John de Bernin, Archbishop of Vienne |
| 1237 | Toulouse | Languedoc | 1 | Cathar Guillelmus Hunaldi |
| 1239 | Montwimer | France | 183–187 | Cathars burned by Inquisitor Robert le Bougre. Exact number uncertain, sources report 183, 184, or 187 |
| 1240s | Albi | Languedoc | 60 | Cathars condemned by Inquisitor Ferrier the Catalan; uncertainty if all sentences were carried out |
| 1243 | Toulouse | Languedoc | 2 | Cathar Perfects |
| circa 1270 | Toulouse | Languedoc | 1 | Cleric burned for heresy; exact date unknown |
| 1276 | Carcassonne | Languedoc | 1 | Cathar Raymond Carbonnel |
| before 1302 | Carcassonne | Languedoc | 1 | Cathar Bernard Montesquieu |
| 1308 | Toulouse | Languedoc | 2 | Two Cathars, Pontius Amiel and Philipa de Tunicio, condemned to death by Toulouse Inquisitor Bernard Gui |
| 1309 | Toulouse | Languedoc | 2 | Two Cathars, Petrus Bernerii and Amelius de Perlis, condemned to death by Toulouse Inquisitor Bernard Gui |
| 1310 | Toulouse | Languedoc | 18 | Cathars condemned to death by Toulouse Inquisitor Bernard Gui: Durandus Barrani; Guilielmus Arnaldi Fabri Espanhol; Guilielmus Mercaderi de Borno; Guilielmus de Clayraco senior; Raymndus Dominici de Borno; Petrus Sicardi de la Boyssa; Petrus de Clayraco de Verlhaco junior; Gentilis Barra de Tholosa; Sancius Borrelli de Bolhaco; Bernardus Borrelli de Bolhaco; Guilielmus de Verduno de Bolhaco; Poncius dels Ugos; Bruna dels Ugos; Perrus Nicholay de Verduneto; Condors Usabe de Verduneto; Bernardus Ysabe de Verduneto; Petrus Guilielmi de Pruneto; Peire Autier |
| 1310 | Paris | France | 2 | Heretic mystic Marguerite Porete and a Jewish convert burned by Inquisitor William of Paris |
| 1312 | Toulouse | Languedoc | 5 | Cathars condemned to death by Toulouse Inquisitor Bernard Gui: Petrus Andree de Verduneto; Raymundus Sancii de Garda; Raymunda de Rotgeriis; Johanna de Lantario de Rotgeriis; Finas Bertrici de Rabinia |
| 1312 | Toulouse | Languedoc | 1 | Cathar Petrus Raymundus de Hugonibus condemned to death by Toulouse Inquisitor Bernard Gui |
| 1316 | Toulouse | Languedoc | 1 | Waldensian Johannes Brayssan condemned to death by Toulouse Inquisitor Bernard Gui |
| 1318 | Marseille | Provence | 4 | Franciscan Spirituals (Beguines) burned by Inquisitor Michel Le Moine |
| 1319–1320 | Toulouse | Languedoc | 4 | Waldensians Johannes Philibertus, Johannes Chavoat, and Perrine de Vincendat, as well as Cathar Guillaume Calverie de Cordes condemned to death by Toulouse Inquisitor Bernard Gui |
| 1321 | Pamiers | Languedoc | 3 | Cathar Guilielmus Fortis de Monte Alione and 2 Waldensians Johannes de Vienna and Hugueta de Vienna condemned to death by Toulouse Inquisitor Bernard Gui |
| 1322 | Toulouse | Languedoc | 5 | Waldensian Ermenio Burgunda de Alzona and Beguines Guilielmus Ruffi, Petrus Dominici, Petrus Hospitalis, and Petrus Guiraudi condemned to death by Toulouse Inquisitor Bernard Gui |
| 1322–1329 | Carcassonne | Languedoc | 28 | 19 Beguines, 2 Cathars, and 7 other heretics burned by inquisitors Jean de Beaune, Jean Duprat, and Henri de Chamay |
| 1323 | Lodeve | Languedoc | 3 | Beguines burned by Carcassonne Inquisitor Jean de Beaune |
| 1323 | Paris | France | 1 | Necromancer |
| after 1323 | Toulouse | Languedoc | 4 | Beguines Peire Calvet, Raimon de Brachio, Peire Morier, and Bernard de Na Jacma. In 1322 they were sentenced to prison, but later burned in Toulouse as recidivists. Exact dates of their executions are unknown, must have been after Bernard Gui resigned as Toulouse inquisitor |
| 1326 | Avignon | Provence | 1 | Beguine Bernard Maury |
| 1329 | Albi | Languedoc | 3 | Heretics burned by Carcassonne Inquisitor Henri de Chamay |
| 1347 | Carcassonne | Languedoc | 5 | Beguines |
| 1347 | Toulouse | Languedoc | 1 | Beguine |
| 1347 | Qirieu | Provence | 1 | Waldensian |
| 1348 | Embrun | Provence | 12 | Waldensians |
| 1354 | Avignon | Provence | 2 | Fraticelli |
| 1366 | Valpute | Provence | 13 | Waldensians |
| before 1370 | Poligny | Burgundy-Lorraine | 1 | Vuillemin Rodet burned as a heretic |
| 1372 | Paris | France | 1 | Jeanne Daubenton, alleged leader of the so-called Company of Poverty, burned by General Inquisitor Jacques de Morey |
| 1382 | Embrun | Provence | 3 | Waldensians burned by Inquisitor François Borel |
| 1382 | Valpute | Provence | 3 | Waldensians burned by Inquisitor François Borel |
| 1417 | Montpellier | Languedoc | 1 | Catherine Sauve, alleged follower of the "heresy of the Free Spirit", burned by Raymond Cabasse, deputy to Carcassonne Inquisitor Pierre de Marvejols |
| 1424 | Briançonnais | Provence | 1 | Witch |
| 1428–1437 | Aosta | Provence | 3 | Witches |
| 1429 | Bardonneche | Provence | 1 | Heretic Antoine Andrè |
| 1429–1430 | Freiburg | Burgundy-Lorraine | 3 | Waldensians burned by Inquisitor Ulric de Torrente |
| 1432 | Briançon | Provence | 2 | |
| 1436 | Valpute | Provence | 2 | |
| 1437 | Oulx | Provence | 7 | |
| 1438 | Briançon | Provence | 3 | |
| 1438 | La Tour du Pin | Provence | 1 | Pierre Vallin burned as a sorcerer |
| 1438 | Lausanne | Burgundy-Lorraine | 1 | Pierre de la Prélaz burned for sorcery by Inquisitor Ulric de Torrente |
| 1438 | Nevers | France | 1 | |
| 1439 | Neuchatel | Burgundy-Lorraine | 2 | Jaquet dou Plain and Enchimandus le Masseler burned as "heretics" (likely sorcerers) by Inquisitor Ulric de Torrente |
| circa 1442 | Dauphiné | Provence | 1 | Witch |
| 1445–1449 | Aosta | Provence | 7 | Witches |
| 1446 | Talloires | Burgundy-Lorraine | 1 | Witch |
| 1448 | Lausanne | Burgundy-Lorraine | 2 | Witches |
| 1455 | Talloires | Burgundy-Lorraine | 2 | Witches |
| 1456 | Metz | Burgundy-Lorraine | 1 | Witch |
| 1458 | Lausanne | Burgundy-Lorraine | 1 | Witch |
| 1458–1459 | Chamonix | Burgundy-Lorraine | 4 | Witches |
| 1459 | Avalon | Provence | 4 | Witches |
| 1459 | Langres | France | 1 | Monk burned for witchcraft |
| 1459–1462 | Arras | France | 12 | Witches burned by Pierre Le Broussart, deputy of Inquisitor General Roland Le Cozic for Arras |
| 1460–1462 | Aosta | Provence | 2 | Witches |
| 1461 | Lausanne | Burgundy-Lorraine | 1 | Witch |
| 1462 | Chamonix | Burgundy-Lorraine | 8 | Witches |
| 1462 | Valais | Burgundy-Lorraine | 1 | Witch |
| 1464 | Lausanne | Burgundy-Lorraine | 1 | Witch |
| 1465 | Lille | France | 1 | Waldensian burned by Inquisitor Nicolas Jacquier |
| 1466 | Aosta | Provence | 2 | Witches |
| 1467 | Rouerge | Languedoc | 1 | Pierre Trahinier burned as a supporter of schismatic Jean Carrier by Inquisitor Antoine Thalussi |
| 1477 | Villars-Chabod | Burgundy-Lorraine | 1 | Witch |
| 1481 | Neuchatel | Burgundy-Lorraine | 4 | Witches |
| 1482 | Lausanne | Burgundy-Lorraine | 1 | Witch |
| 1484 | Lausanne | Burgundy-Lorraine | 2 | Witches |
| 1485 | Talloires | Burgundy-Lorraine | 1 | Witch |
| 1489 | Embrun | Provence | 1 | Waldensian Pierre Valoy burned by Inquisitor François Plouvier |
| 1490 | Vivarais | Provence | 1 | Witch |
| 1493 | Aosta | Provence | 1 | Witch |
| 1497 | Vivarais | Provence | 1 | Witch |
| 1519 | Vivarais | Provence | 1 | Catherine Peyretonne burned as a witch by Louis Bruny, deputy inquisitor of Louis Chambonis |
| 1519 | Metz | Burgundy-Lorraine | 1 | Witch burned by Inquisitor Nicolas Savin |
| 1521 | Poligny | Burgundy-Lorraine | 3 | Shepherds burned as werewolves by Inquisitor Jean Boin |
| 1525 | Metz | Burgundy-Lorraine | 1 | Protestant Jean Castellane burned by Inquisitor Nicolas Savin |
| 1527 | Geneva | Burgundy-Lorraine | 1 | Claudia Layne burned as a witch by Inquisitor Etienne de Geul |
| 1532 | Aosta | Provence | 4 | Witches burned by Inquisitor Desiderius Theodorici |
| 1533 | Archdiocese of Aix-en-Provence | Provence | 7 | Waldensians burned by Inquisitor Jean de Roma |
| 1534 | Viry near Geneva | Burgundy-Lorraine | 1 | Woman burned as a witch by Inquisitor Amadeus Lambert |
| 1537 | Aosta | Provence | 1 | Man burned as a warlock by deputy Inquisitor Desiderius Theodorici |
| 1538 | Carcassonne | Languedoc | 1 | Gabriel Amalin, accused of Lutheranism, sentenced to death by Inquisitor Raymond d'Abbatis |
| 1539 | Toulouse | Languedoc | 1 | Etienne Margeti, sentenced to death by Toulouse Inquisitor Vidal de Becanis |
| 1553 | Toulouse | Languedoc | 1 | Pierre Serres, priest accused of Lutheranism, sentenced to death by Inquisitor Esprit Rotier |

=== Episcopal inquisition ===
French bishops continued their active inquisitorial activities even after the establishment of the papal inquisition. Between 1232 and 1234, Bishop Raymond of Toulouse probably condemned several dozen Cathars to the stake; some of these executions were recorded by Guillaume Pelhisson in his chronicle. Ferrier the Catalan, who served as the bishop's inquisitor in the Archdiocese of Narbonne before becoming the papal inquisitor of Carcassonne in 1242, sentenced at least 20 people to imprisonment between 1237 and 1239.

From 1249 to 1257, episcopal inquisitors in the Diocese of Toulouse issued 306 convictions, not including penitential penalties imposed during "periods of grace". 21 people were sentenced to death, 239 to imprisonment, and additionally, 30 were condemned in absentia and 11 posthumously; in five other cases, the type of punishment is unknown, but since all involved relapsed heretics, only imprisonment or the stake were possible.

Bishop Bernard Castanet of Albi issued 35 sentences for imprisonment under varying degrees of severity between 1299 and 1300. Bishop Jacques Fournier of Pamiers investigated 89 individuals from 1318 to 1325. He issued at least 64 convictions, including five individuals condemned to be burned, 46 to imprisonment, nine to wear penitential crosses, and four posthumously condemned (including two exhumations and two who died in prison). The last Cathar Perfect, Guillaume Bélibaste, was burned in 1321 in Villerouge-Termenes by order of Archbishop Bernard de Farges of Narbonne. Between 1319 and 1322, episcopal courts in Languedoc burned 67 Beguines.

In the north of the country, the introduction of the inquisition did not stop the bishops' anti-heretical activities. In 1411, Bishop Pierre d'Ailly of Cambrai sentenced a member of the sect called Homines Intelligentiae to imprisonment. In May 1421, in Douai, the Bishop of Arras judged 25 Waldensians, five of whom he burned, while the rest were punished with exile, imprisonment, or penitential crosses. In 1431, Bishop Pierre Cauchon of Beauvais sentenced Joan of Arc (later rehabilitated) to the stake, and she was burned in Rouen. Around the same time, bishops in Flanders were also prosecuting those suspected of heresy.

The investigation against the Waldensians in the Alps, initiated in 1486 by Archbishop Jean Bayle of Embrun, was a complete failure as the valley inhabitants refused to submit. This led to the declaration of a crusade against the Waldensians. During the Reformation, the anti-heretical activities of bishops, like those of inquisitors, came under increasing parliamentary control. Death sentences generally required approval by parliamentary courts. Most heresy trials in the 16th century before episcopal courts involved clergy, especially diocesan clergy.

== Bibliography ==
- Barber, Malcolm (2005). Katarzy (in Polish). Warsaw: PIW. ISBN 83-06-02923-2.
- Behringer, Wolfgang (2004). Witches and Witch-Hunts: A Global History. Polity Press Ltd. ISBN 978-0745627182.
- Burnham, Louisa Anne (2008). So great a light, so great a smoke: the Beguin heretics of Languedoc. Cornell University Press. ISBN 978-0-8014-4131-8.
- Calmet, Augustin (1751). Histoire de Lorraine (in French). Vol. IV. Nancy.
- Cameron, Euan (2000). Waldenses: rejections of holy church in medieval Europe. Wiley-Blackwell. ISBN 978-0-631-22497-6.
- Costen, Michael (1997). The Cathars and the Albigensian Crusade. Manchester: Manchester University Press. ISBN 978-0-7190-4332-1.
- Del Col, Andrea (2010). L'Inquisizione in Italia (in Italian). Mediolan: Oscar Mondadori. ISBN 978-88-04-53433-4.
- Given, James (2001). Inquisition and Medieval Society. Cornell University Press. ISBN 0-8014-8759-5.
- Kieckhefer, Richard (1979). Repression of Heresy in Medieval Germany. Liverpool: Liverpool University Press. ISBN 0-85323-134-6.
- Kieckhefer, Richard (1976). European witch trials: their foundations in popular and learned culture, 1300-1500. Berkeley & Los Angeles: University of California Press. ISBN 978-0-520-02967-5.
- Kras, Paweł (2006). Ad abolendam diversarum haeresium pravitatem. System inkwizycyjny w średniowiecznej Europie (in Polish). Lublin: Wydawnictwo KUL. ISBN 83-7363-431-2.
- Lambert, Malcolm (1998). The Cathars. Wiley-Blackwell. ISBN 978-0-631-20959-1.
- Lambert, Malcolm (2002). Średniowieczne herezje (in Polish). Gdańsk-Warsaw: MARABUT. ISBN 83-916989-5-5.
- Lea, Henry Charles (2016) [1887]. A History of the Inquisition of the Middle Ages. Vol. I–III. London–New York: FB&C Limited. ISBN 9781333221058.
- Lerner, Robert (2007). The Heresy of the Free Spirit in the Middle Ages. University of Notre Dame Press. ISBN 978-0-268-01094-2.
- Marx, Jean (1914). L'Inquisition en Dauphine (in French). Paris: Nabu Press.
- Mentzer, Raymond (1984). Heresy Proceedings in Languedoc, 1500–1560. Philadelphia: American Philosophical Society. ISBN 978-1-4223-7460-3.
- Monter, William (1999). Judging the French Reformation. Heresy trials by sixteenth-century parliaments. Cambridge & London: Harvard University Press. ISBN 978-0-674-48860-1.
- Monter, William (2002). "Heresy executions in Reformation Europe, 1520–1565". In Grell, Ole Peter; Scribner, Robert (eds.). Tolerance and Intolerance in the European Reformation. Cambridge University Press. ISBN 978-0-674-48860-1.
- Pegg, William (2001). The Corruption of Angels. The Great Inquisition of 1245 – 1246. Princeton – Oxford: Princeton University Press. ISBN 0-691-00656-3.
- Peters, Edward (1989). Inquisition. Berkeley – Los Angeles: University of California Press. ISBN 9-780520-066304.
- Seifert, Petra, ed. (2006). Księga Inkwizycji. Podręcznik napisany przez Bernarda Gui (in Polish). Kraków: Wydawnictwo WAM. ISBN 83-7097-941-6.
- Sutherland, Nicola Mary (1984). Princes, politics, and religion, 1547-1589. Continuum International Publishing Group. ISBN 978-0-907628-44-6.
- Tanon, Louis (1893). Histoire des tribunaux de l'inquisition en France (in French). Paris: L. Larose & Forcel.
- Vidal, Jean-Marie (1913). Bullaire de l'Inquisition Français au XIV siecle et jusqu'a la fin du Grand Schisme (in French). Paris: Librairie Letouzey.
