= Pierre Vallin =

French man accused of witchcraft

Pierre Vallin was a French man who was tried for practicing witchcraft in 1438.

== Life ==
Vallin was from La Tour-du-Pin, France. He was a vassal of the Lord of Tournon.

== Crime ==
On 15 March 1438, Vallin was tried for witchcraft at La Tour-du-Pin, by the officers of the Archbishop of Vienne, and the Franciscan Inquisition. He confessed to the crime after being tortured, although records stated that he confessed voluntarily. Vallin said that he "regularly rode on a stick" to the sabbat, where children were eaten, and told officers that he gave himself to a demon named Beelzebub, at least 63 years ago, in the form of a 20 year-old woman. He paid homage to Beelzebub by paying a liard annually, kneeling, and kissing the thumb of Beelzebub's left hand. When his daughter, Françoise, was six months old, Vallin sacrificed her to the Devil.

The judges ruled that Vallin was a "heretic, idolater, apostate, and invoker of demons", and his possessions were all confiscated. After the trial expenses were deducted, a third of the remaining possessions were reserved for the Archbishop of Vienne and the Franciscan Inquisition.

On 16 March 1438, in a second trial, Vallin was prosecuted by the fiscal of the lord of Tournan, as the fiscals wanted to know the names of his accomplices, who also rode on their sticks to the sabbat. The court noted that Vallin was convicted of sortilegiis in 1431, and he was threatened with burning if he reoffended. He was tortured again, and demanded to name priests, clerics, nobles and rich men. Vallin gave ten names, mostly men.

Vallin was guilty of diabolism and sorcery by "beating spring to induce storm", and executed by the French inquisitorial vicar. The fate of the accomplices were not known, but it was stated that they were probably burned to death.
