= Peire Autier =

French Cathar Good Man (leader)

- Born: c. 1245
- Died: 10 April 1310; Toulouse
- Other names: Pierre Autier

Peire Autier, Peire Authié or Pierre Authié (French: Peire Authié) was a Cathar Good Man (leader) in the Languedoc region of southern France. Originally a notary from Ax-les-Thermes, he travelled to Lombardy and Piedmont with his brother, Jacques, in the 1290s and converted to Catharism. During the winter of 1299–1300, he returned to Languedoc to revive the Cathar Church. He was arrested by the inquisitor Geoffroy d'Ablis in August 1309 and burned at the stake for heresy on April 10, 1310.
