= Robert le Bougre =

Catholic inquisitor (1173–1239)

Robert le Bougre ('Robert the Bulgar') was a Dominican friar and papal inquisitor from 1233 until 1239. His nickname may indicate that he had previously been a Cathar, since they were believed to be related to the Bulgarian sect of the Bogomils.

In 1233, Pope Gregory IX assigned Robert to the inquisition against the Cathars in northern France. In 1235, he was appointed inquisitor general for the Kingdom of France. He first established his headquarters at Cambrai, which lay not within France but across the border in the Holy Roman Empire. He worked mainly in the County of Flanders and the County of Champagne, developing a reputation for harshness and sending many supposed heretics to be burnt at the stake. Matthew of Paris calls him the "hammer of the heretics" (malleus haereticorum). By 1239, however, his methods had turned some bishops against him. He was removed from his position and sentenced to life in prison by a papal court.

Robert has typically been portrayed as "the very model of the terrible inquisitor, a fanatic who launched a reign of terror", although Georges Despy has pushed back, arguing that the "inflationary spiral" of violence resulted from papal, royal and episcopal motives and not of Robert's fanatical zeal.
