= Geoffroy d'Ablis =

French Dominican friar

- Died: 1316
- Occupation: Friar
- Organization: Order of Preachers

Geoffroy d'Ablis was a Dominican who led the Inquisition in Carcassonne against Cathars such as Peire Autier from 1303 to 1316. He collaborated with Bernard Gui, the inquisitor at Toulouse.
