= Grignan-Les Adhemar AOC =

Grignan-Les Adhemar
- Wine region
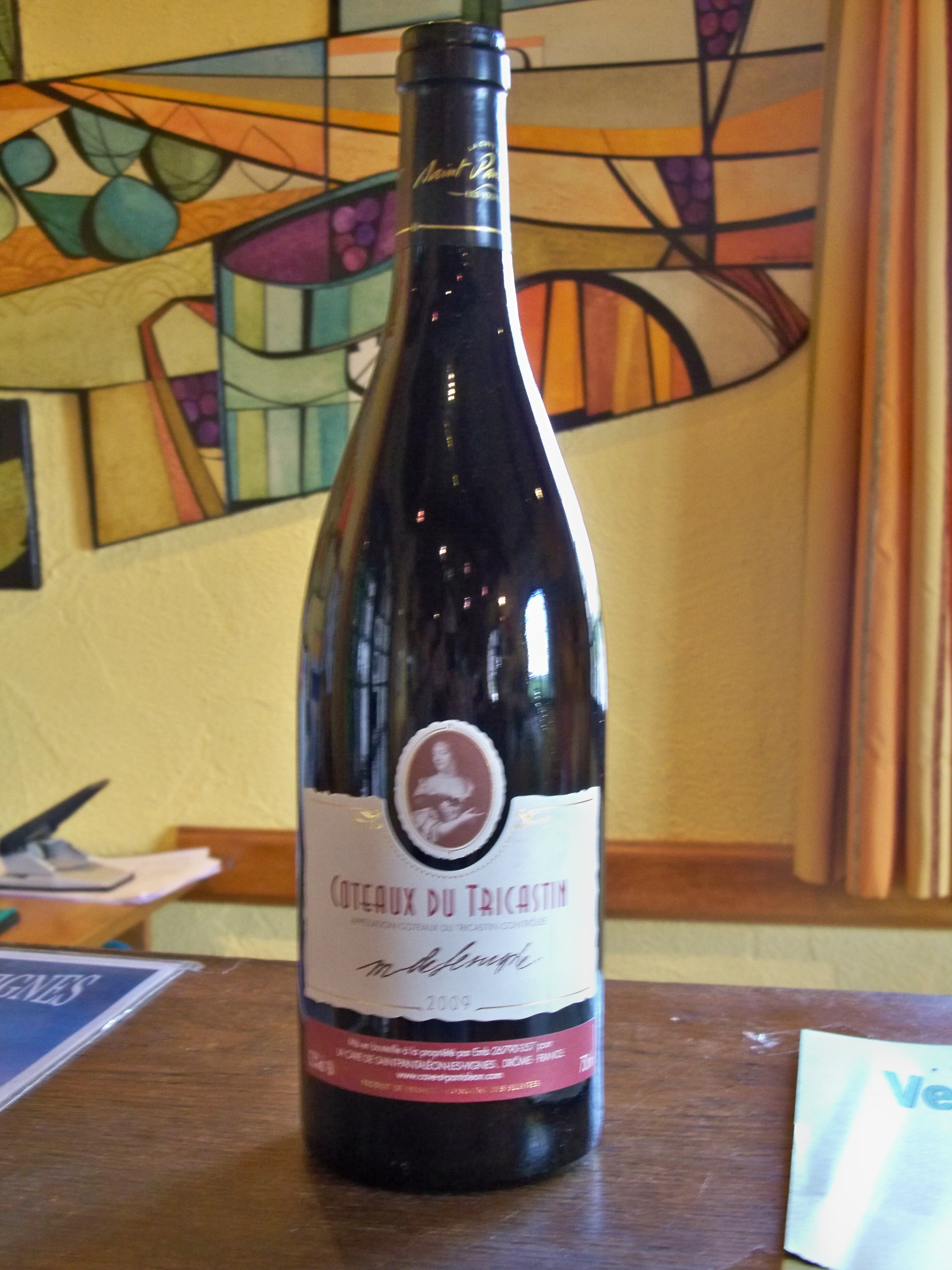
- Official name: Grignan-Les Adhemar AOC
- Type: AOC
- Year established: VDQS 1965; AOC 1973
- Years of wine industry: >2,000
- Country: France
- Part of: Rhône Valley
- Climate region: mediterranean
- Soil conditions: limestone clay, sand, quaternary sediment
- Total area: 2,830
- Size of planted vineyards: 2,566
- No. of vineyards: 307
- Grapes produced: Bourboulenc, Carignan, Cinsault, Clairette blanche, Grenache, Grenache blanc, Mourvèdre, Marsanne, Roussane, Syrah, Viognier
- No. of wineries: 66
- Wine produced: red, white, rosé
- Comments: 2005

The Grignan-Les Adhemar AOC (formerly the Côteaux du Tricastin) is the northernmost wine-growing AOC in the southern area of the Rhône wine region of France. The wines are produced in 21 communes in the department of Drôme on the east bank of the Rhône River in a triangle bounded by Saint-Paul-Trois-Châteaux, Montélimar, and Grignan; opposite the Côtes du Vivarais AOC on the right bank. the vineyards straddle both the true Mediterranean and the continental climatic regions where in this part of France the transition is rapid, winter snow being frequent in Montélimar but rare some 20 - 30 kilometres further south. In this transitional area between the northern and southern Rhône wine regions that constitutes the northern limit of the Provence, the climate in Baume-le-Transit and St Paul are more typically Mediterranean climate than the slightly cooler areas dominated by the Lance mountain.

According to archeological finds, particularly the remains of the largest Roman wine villa in Donzère dating from the 1st century BC, wine has been produced in the region since the antiquity. Tricastin wines were mentioned in the writings of the Marquise de Sevigné in the 16th century. The wines were accorded an AOVDQS on 19 March 1964, and were awarded their AOC on 27 July 1973.

== Wines ==
A characteristic of the wines from this appellation is their great diversity due to the many and mixed soil types and varied climates. The central part of the region comprises sandstone hills, while the southeast is covered with stones or gravel. The west is mainly alluvial soil with calcairous stones, and the north is covered with large glacial pebbles.

Red wines which comprise 95% of the total production, are made from the principal varieties of Grenache noir and Syrah (10% minimum), with secondary varieties of Cinsault, Mourvèdre, and Carignan. No single variety may be present at more than 80%. A non defined quantity of secondary varieties must not exceed 30%, or if declared separately, not more than 15% each.

Rosé: The same varieties in the same permitted proportions are used as for the red.

White wines are produced from Grenache blanc, Roussanne, Clairette blanc, Marsanne, Roussanne, and Viognier. No variety may be present in excess of 60%

All wines must contain a minimum of 11% alcohol.

== Economy ==
The Grignan-Les Adhemar wines are produced by a total of 324 concerns which include 307 growers, 49 private wineries, 13 cooperative wineries, and 8 producer/merchants. INAO statistics show that in 2007, 94,961 hectolitres were produced from 2,566 cultivated at an average yield of 52 hectolitres per hectare.

The wines are produced in 21 communes of the Drôme département at the northern limit of the Provence: Allan, Baume de Transit, Chamaret, Chantemerle-lès-Grignan, Châteauneuf-du-Rhône, Clansayes, Comonzelle, Donzère, Garde-Adhémar, Granges-Gontardes, Grignan, Malataverne, Montségur-sur-Lauzon, Reauville, Roche-Saint-Secret-Béconne, Roussas, Saint-Paul-Trois-Châteaux, Saint Restitut, Salles-sous-Bois, Solérieux, Valaurie.

== Name change ==
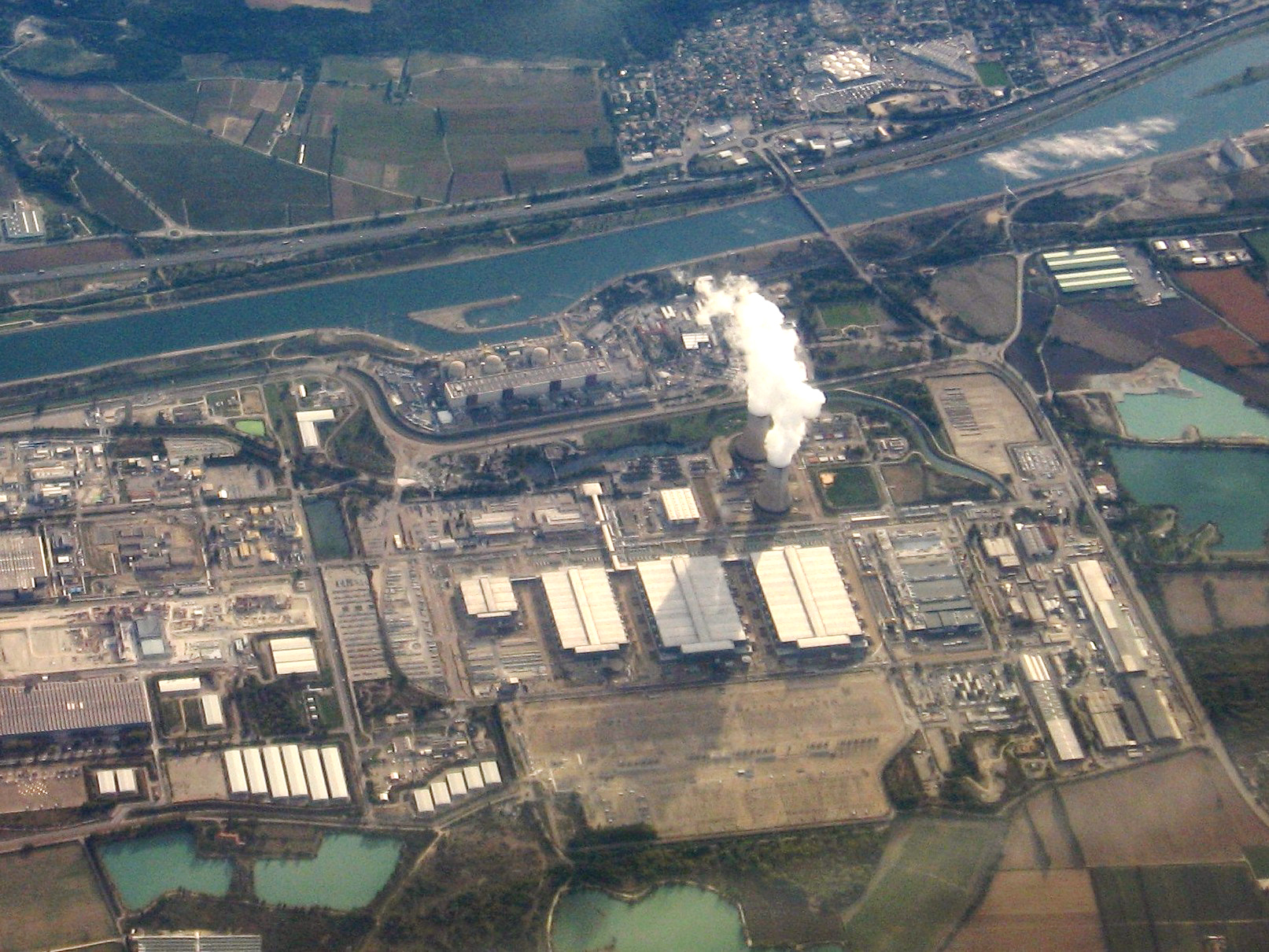
The Tricastin Nuclear Power Plant is located in the wine region where an accident in July 2008 prompted officials to consider a name change for the area.

Following an accident at the Tricastin Nuclear Power Plant in July 2008, when uranium was released, the sale of Coteaux du Tricastin wine decreased. The wine growers therefore wished to change the name of the appellation to something without "Tricastin", to avoid being associated with the nuclear power plant. In June 2010, INAO signalled its intention to allow a name change to Grignan-Les Adhemar effective from the 2010 vintage.

== See also ==
- Adhemar of Le Puy
- Château des Adhémar
- François Adhémar de Monteil, Comte de Grignan
- Françoise-Marguerite de Sévigné, comtesse de Grignan
- List of Vins de Primeur
- Tricastin
