= Mandrin Cave =

French archaeological site

Coordinates: 44°28′10″N 4°46′17″E

- Grotte Mandrin (French)
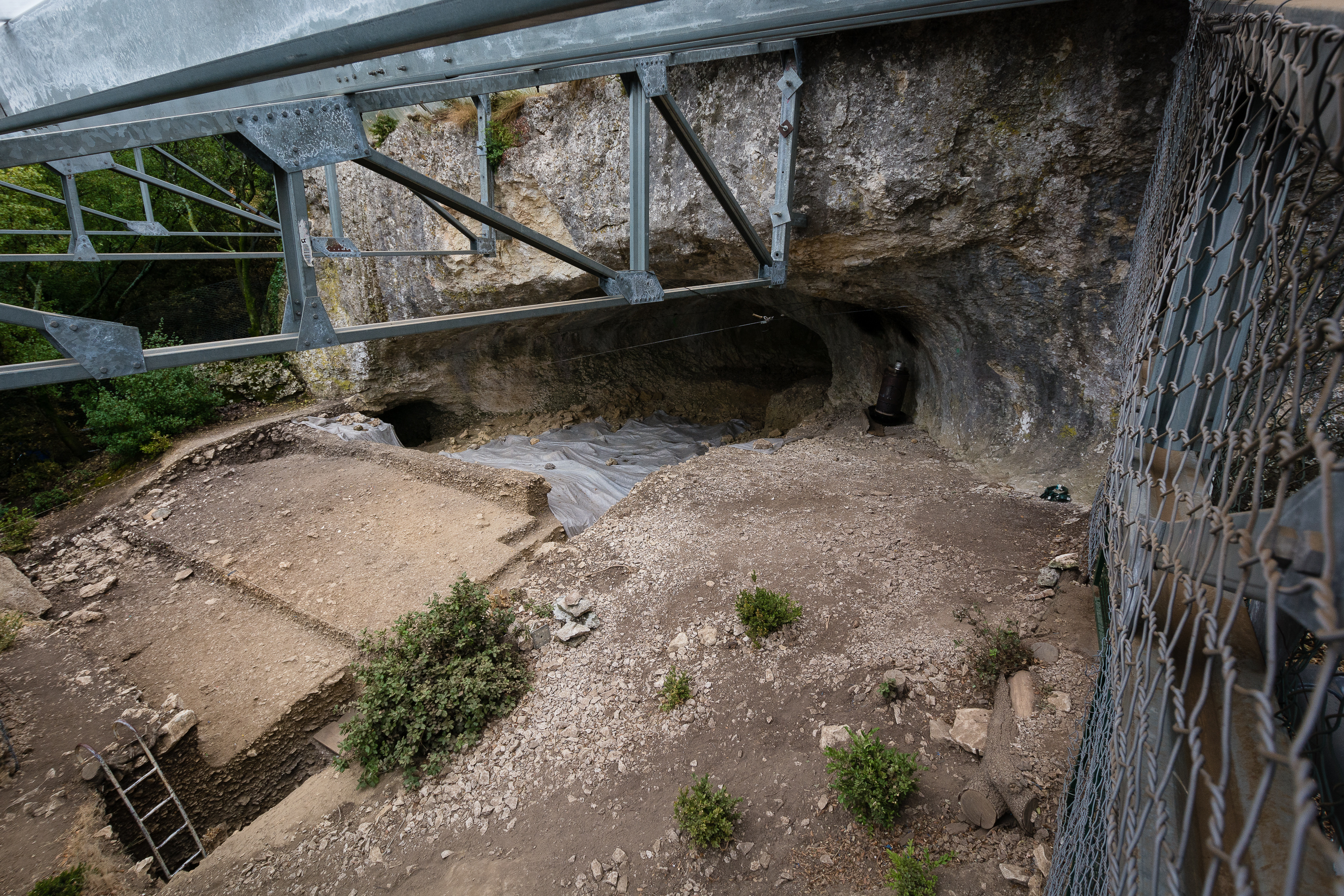
- View of the entrance to the Mandrin Cave in 2016 (with protective equipment)
- Interactive map of Mandrin Cave
- Associated with: Neanderthals, modern humans
- Region: Drôme department
- Nearest city: Malataverne

Site notes
- Elevation: 226 m (741 ft)

Mandrin Cave (French: Grotte Mandrin) is a French rock shelter located in the commune of Malataverne, in the Drôme department of the Auvergne-Rhône-Alpes region, within the natural and historical area of Tricastin. The cave is currently undergoing archaeological excavation.

It was occupied during the Middle and Upper Paleolithic periods, from 120,000 to 42,000 years ago, by Homo sapiens and Neanderthals, sometimes within a few years of each other, suggesting possible interactions between the two populations.

During the earliest period, the Last Interglacial (Eemian), a particularly temperate interglacial period, temperatures were very high for about fifteen millennia.

== Location and description ==
This rock shelter is located approximately 2.5 km (1.6 mi) southeast of the town centre of Malataverne (about 10 km (6.2 mi) south of Montélimar, Drôme), on the left bank of the Rhône River east of the A7 motorway, at an altitude of 226 m (741 ft), (Note: According to the contour line 225 m on the IGN map, which precisely locates the cave. A pointing using the interactive IGN map (geoportail.gouv.fr) gives 226 m to within 0.5 m.) on the northwest flank of a limestone outcrop called "Roucoule", which rises to 392 m (1,286 ft). Roucoule is also the name of the locality in Malataverne where the outcrop is situated, on the border of the communes of Allan and Roussas.

The opening, approximately 12 m (39 ft) wide, faces north. The cave ceiling reaches a height of 2.5 m (8.2 ft) in the entrance area, then narrows to 1 m (3.3 ft) towards the back of the cave. The surface area is approximately 25 m^{2} (270 sq ft). In 2013, the area opposite the shelter was covered and fenced off. The site has been under surveillance since 2016.

== History ==
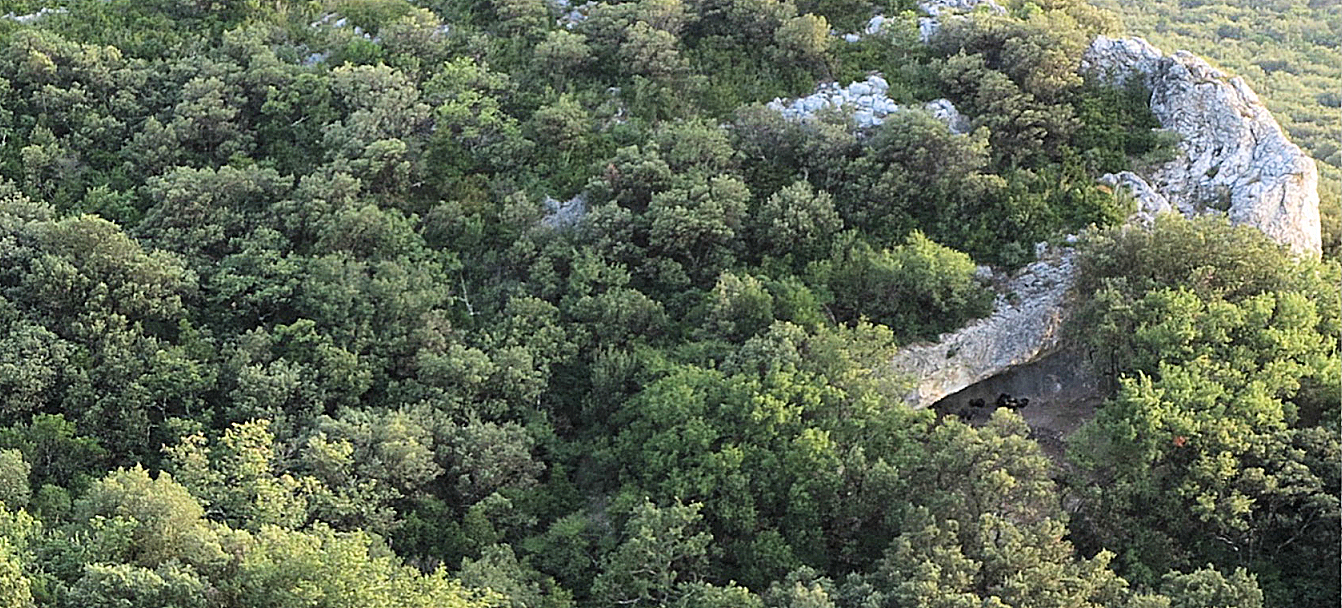
Mandrin Cave (aerial view)

The cave was named by its discoverer in the early 1960s, Gaston Étienne, who believed it might have been occupied by Louis Mandrin, the famous 18th-century smuggler, as he had likely stayed several times in the area, in Roucoule. Despite its name, there is no proof that it was frequented by the smuggler's gang. There are numerous caves named after Mandrin throughout the Dauphiné region and its surroundings; it is unlikely that he stayed in all the caves that bear his name. In Grenoble (Isère), Mandrin's name is associated with caves dug a century after his death.

The cave was the subject of surveys conducted by Gaston Étienne in the 1960s. It has been excavated since 1991 under the direction of Yves Giraud and then Ludovic Slimak. (Note: Ludovic Slimak is a research fellow at the National Centre for Scientific Research (CNRS) and attached to the Centre for Anthropobiology and Genomics of Toulouse.)

In 2017, the Mandrin cave was the subject of one of the first fuliginochronology (soot chronology) studies in France. The study focused on samples of limestone walls in which traces of soot were trapped; samples were taken from several stratigraphic layers between 2006 and 2017. These soot deposits originate from fires lit by Paleolithic inhabitants.

The archaeological site of the Mandrin cave, encompassing the cave and its slope, the thalweg, the summit ridge, and the head of the valley, was listed as a monument historique (historical monument) by decree of 14 October 2024.

== Prehistory ==
=== Human occupations ===
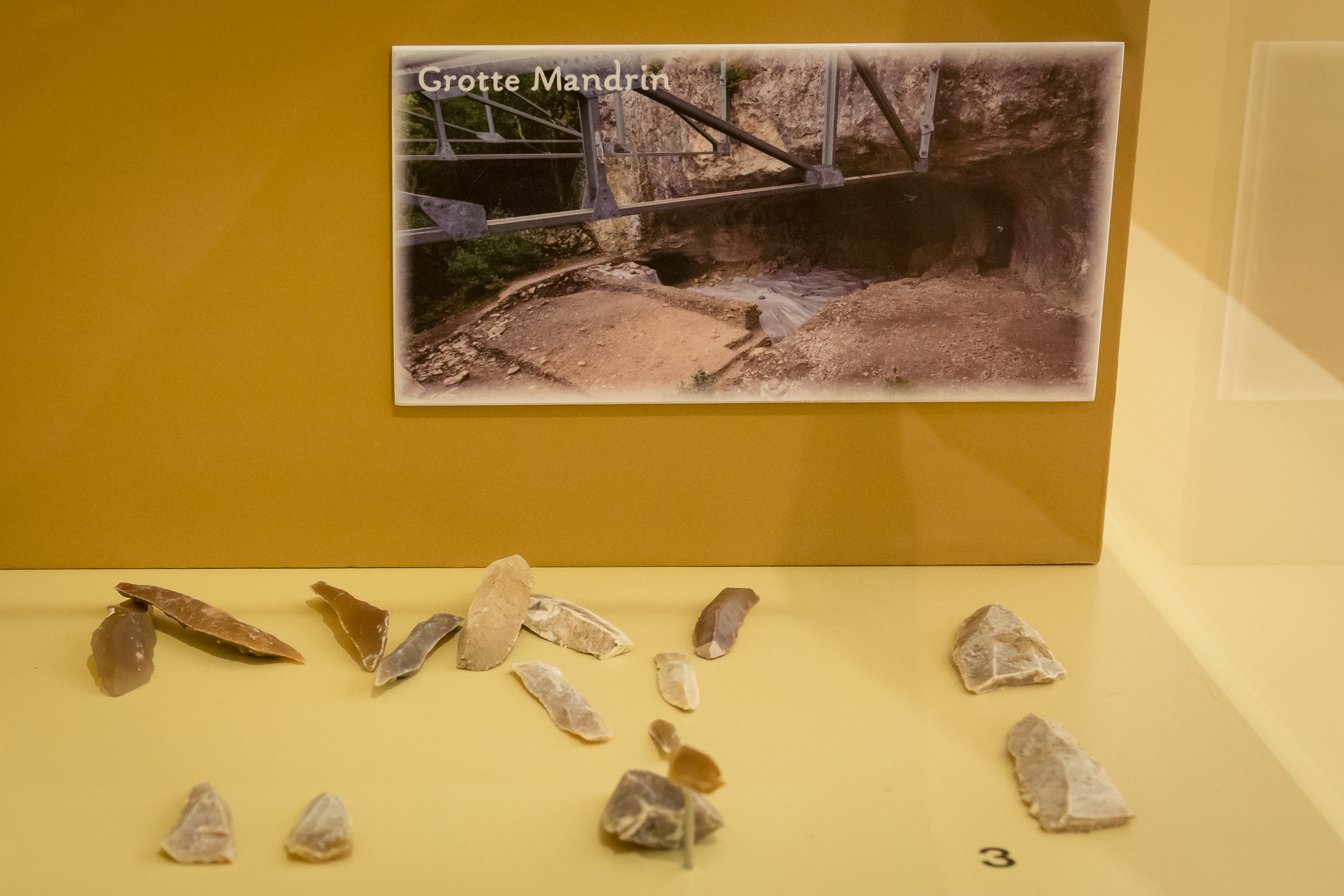
Stone tools from Mandrin Cave

The site was inhabited by groups of Neanderthals and Homo sapiens. Archaeologists' interest in this cave stems in particular from the fact that the settlements of these two populations were separated by only a few years, or perhaps even less; it is even possible to consider that Mandrin Cave was a meeting place for Neanderthals and modern humans.

A study published in 2022 concluded that the occupation by Homo sapiens dates back 54,000 years (between 56,800 and 51,700 years, calibrated, before present). The dating, obtained by fuliginochronology and confirmed by thermoluminescence, concerns a layer of sediment named layer E. This layer contains modern (fine and standardised) tools and a broken molar of a baby, whose talonid is modern (square), while the layers immediately below and above contain Neanderthal remains and Mousterian tools.

=== Archaeological finds ===
Similarities exist between archaeological finds from Mandrin Cave (layer E) and those found at a Levantine site, Ksar Akil in Lebanon (layers XXV to XXI). Researchers hypothesise an origin outside Europe for the industries of the Rhône cave, in accordance with the hypothesis of a dispersal of modern humans from the Near East to Europe during the early Upper Paleolithic period. Ludovic Slimak considers it possible that "a Homo sapiens community, probably from the Levant," made an "incursion into the Rhône Valley.". The paleoanthropologist Jean-Jacques Hublin believes that this hypothesis remains to be confirmed.

=== Genetics ===
Fossil remains of a Neanderthal nicknamed Thorin were discovered in 2015 at the entrance to the cave, near archaeological remains typical of technology dated in the region to 50,000–40,000 years ago, and are being progressively excavated. A fragment of the palate and several teeth were studied in 2024, both morphologically and genetically. The genome indicates that this Neanderthal population diverged approximately 105,000 years ago from other late Neanderthals and that it did not experience any introgression from other known populations of that period in Europe. It therefore remained genetically isolated for about 50,000 years, despite the relative geographical proximity of these other European populations.

== See also ==
- Ksar Akil
- List of caves in France

== Filmography ==
- Rob Hope, Crépuscule néandertalien, pour aube moderne [Neanderthal twilight, for a modern dawn], 2015, 52 minutes, Y. N. Productions, Ville de Malataverne, Montagne TV, with Ludovic Slimak. Prix du jury et du public du festival de films d'archéologie in Narbonne in October 2016; ;
