= Albert Severin Roche =

French soldier (1895–1939)

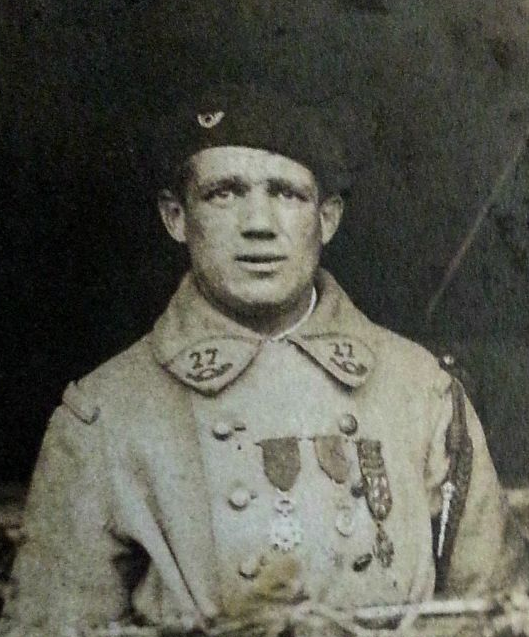
- Roche in 1918
- Born: 5 March 1895; Réauville, France
- Died: 14 April 1939 (aged 44); Avignon, Vaucluse, France
- Military career
- Allegiance: France
- Rank: Second class (private)
- Nickname: The first soldier of France
- Conflicts: World War I
- Awards: Officer of the Légion d'honneur Croix de guerre 1914-1918

Albert Severin Roche (1895–1939) was a distinguished French soldier, known for his numerous successful missions and the capturing of enemy soldiers throughout the First World War.

Ferdinand Foch, the Supreme Allied Commander during the war, said that Roche was "the first soldier of France".

== Biography ==
Roche was born in Reauville, Drôme Department, in south-eastern France, on the 5th of March 1895. He was the third son of a modest family of farmers. His father was Séverin Roche, and his mother was Louise Savel.

In 1913, Roche was rejected by an assessment board of the French Army, because it considered him too puny to serve. This apparently delighted his father, who stated, "We need arms to run the farm." In August 1914, however, Roche wanted to fight, and, in opposition to his father, ran away.

Roche reported in another district at the Allan training camp, which assigned him to the 30th Battalion of Chasseurs. His military training did not go well since he was badly assessed and not respected. His temper finally got the better of him, and he walked off the camp, but he was immediately caught and arrested for desertion. His defence on these charges was that he was not a deserter. He said, "Bad soldiers are sent up there, but I want to go where we fight.”

Roche was assigned on 3 July 1915 to the 27th Battalion of Chasseurs Alpins, engaged in Aisne, in today's Hauts-de-France region, a northern region of France. This battalion was nicknamed the "blue devils" by the Germans. Roche volunteered to destroy a German blockhouse. Creeping up to the enemy's trenches, he noticed that the Germans were pressed against a stove in the block house for heat and threw a handful of grenades down the stove chimney. The position was neutralized, with several deaths and the surrender of the survivors, who believed that they had been attacked by a large force. Roche returned to his base with the captured machine guns and eight prisoners.

In another instance, Roche found himself one day the only survivor of his position, a trench in Sudel in Alsace. He then positioned along the trench, used the weapons of his dead comrades and alternatively firing them. That made the enemy believe that the resistance of the garrison was still resolute, and the Germans eventually gave up the attack. Roche volunteered regularly for reconnaissance missions, but on one occasion, he was captured with his wounded lieutenant. Isolated in a bunker during an interrogation, he managed to overwhelm and kill his interrogator and to steal his pistol. He returned to the French lines with 42 new prisoners while wearing his wounded lieutenant on his back.

During the Second Battle of the Aisne, Roche's captain was seriously wounded and fell between the lines. Roche crawled under fire for six hours to reach him and then another four hours to finally hand him over to stretcher-bearers. Exhausted, he fell asleep in a guard hole, but was awakened by a patrol who mistook him for sleeping on duty. Abandoning a post under fire was punishable by being shot within 24 hours. In spite of his denials, he had no witnesses, and was sent to a detention barracks to await execution. Roche wrote to his father: "In an hour I shall be shot, but I assure you that I am innocent." As he was taken in front of a firing squad, a messenger arrived interrupting them. Roche's captain had just awoken from his coma and brought his favorable testimony.

By the end of the war, Roche had been wounded nine times and had personally captured 1,180 prisoners. At the end of the conflict, at 23, he was still a second-class soldier. On November 27, 1918, on the balcony of the City Hall of Strasbourg, he was presented to General Ferdinand Foch in front of a huge crowd with these words: "Alsatians, I present to you your liberator Albert Roche. He is the first soldier of France!" Shortly before, Foch had surprisingly discovered Roche's service record and exclaimed, "He has done all this, and he has no rank."

Roche returned home to Valréas, in the Vaucluse, where he worked modestly as a municipal labourer and married a woman from Colonzelle, in the neighboring Drôme. They had two children, Magali and Marie-Pierre. Roche eventually became a firefighter in the powder magazine of Sorgues, in the Vaucluse.

In April 1939, he was involved in an accident with a car as he was departing from a bus that took him to work. The car had once belonged to the daughter of the former President of the Republic, Emile Loubet. He was transferred to the Sainte-Marthe hospital in Avignon, where he died on 14 April around 5:00 AM at the age of 44. As the historian Pierre Miquel writes in La Grande Guerre day-to-day, Editions Pluriel: "This man had gone through four years of war, he had been wounded nine times, he had been close to death a thousand times, Almost unjustly shot as a mutineer. He had escaped all dangers, all accidents. [...] All of this to be killed twenty years later, on his way home, on the descent of the bus."

== Honours ==
Roche was awarded the cross of the Legion of Honour from the commander of the Army of the Vosges, General de Maud'huy. He was invited to dine with General Mangin. Roche also held twelve further citations, including four from the order of the Army:

Officier de la Légion d'honneur.

Médaille Militaire.

Croix du combattant volontaire.

Croix de Guerre.

In 1920, with seven of his comrades, Roche carried the coffin of the Unknown Soldier at the ceremony at the Arc de Triomphe. Roche was a member of the French delegation to London in 1925 with General Henri Gouraud to attend the funeral of Field Marshal John French. He and five representatives of the army were also invited to dine with King George V.

Édouard Daladier, the prime minister of France, requested full military honours be given to him at his funeral. In 1971, Réauville erected a cenotaph to his memory in front of his family's house. Originally buried in Sorgues, Roche's body was transferred on September 22, 1967, to Saint-Véran Cemetery, in Avignon, in Vaucluse, where it still lies (square 40, north row, grave 15). A stela in his memory was inaugurated in Réauville in 1971 by Mayor Gabriel Jarniac.

In 2018, La Poste issued a stamp in his memory.

In 2023, the Swedish metal band Sabaton released the album Heroes of the Great War, on which the song "The First Soldier" was dedicated to him.
