= Eyguebelle =

French distillery

Coordinates: 44.42003°N 4.78774°E

- Industry: Beverages
- Founded: 1239; 787 years ago
- Headquarters: 3 chemin de la Méjeonne, 26230 Valaurie, France
- Website: eyguebelle.fr

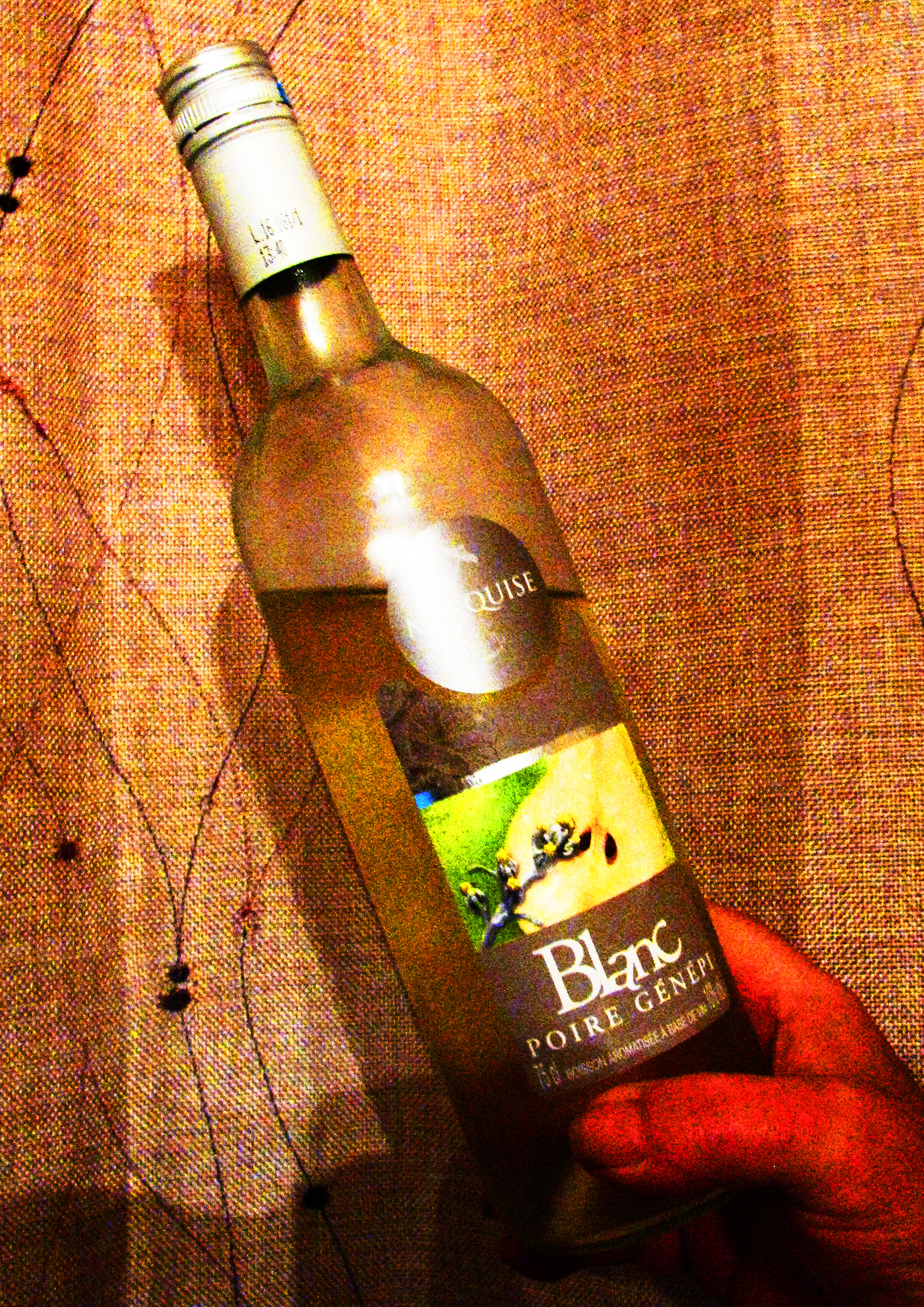
White pear wine from Eyguebelle winery

Eyguebelle is a traditional winery in France founded in 1239, the second oldest after the Château de Goulaine. It is located in Valaurie, Drôme department in southeastern France.

The winery was founded by Cistercian monks of the Aiguebelle Abbey. Today it is a renowned traditional distillery that makes syrups and liqueurs from old recipes. The dedicated monks at the abbey create "elixirs" known throughout the world.

== See also ==
- List of oldest companies
