= Fuliginochronology =

Study in archaeology of soot deposits

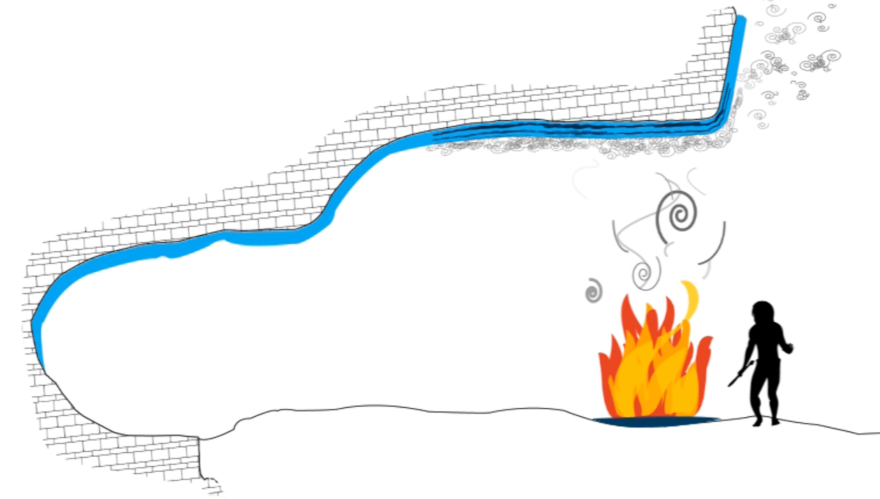
Deposition of successive soots films (black) and calcareouss concretions (blue) on the ceiling of a prehistoric shelter

Fuliginochronology (from the Latin fuligo, "soot") is a method of relative dating developed in archaeology since 2017. Based on a principle analogous to dendrochronology, it relies on the analysis of soot films deposited on calcareous concretions in certain caves.

== History ==
In archaeology, the presence of soot in concretions was initially used as a marker of human presence, without any intention of dating.

Before being termed "fuliginochronology," soot dating was used around 1997 by Jacques Élie Brochier in the Balma de la Margineda rock shelter in Andorra. He specifically mentions a subannual resolution in the regular appearance of soot films in the sparite/micrite doublets of the calcite walls. The method was also used by paleoclimatologist Dominique Genty around 1998 in the Postojna Cave in Slovenia, then in the Caves of Han-sur-Lesse in Belgium and in the Villars Cave in Dordogne, France.

Fuliginochronology was formalised starting in 2017 by Ségolène Vandevelde for the study of the Mandrin Cave near Malataverne, Drôme, occupied during the Middle and Upper Paleolithic periods. The study focused on numerous samples of calcareous walls, worn down by the elements and found in several stratigraphic layers. She then applied this method to other sites such as the Arcy-sur-Cure caves in France and the Caves of Nerja in Andalusia.

== Method ==
Fuliginochronology is the study of the succession of these soot films, a method that allows dating of successive periods of human occupation in caves.

In the presence of fire, successive soot films are progressively covered by concretions and amalgamated with the lime. In some cases, the mechanical erosion of the walls by water circulation, wind, and frost can cause fragments to fall, becoming integrated into the archaeological layers of the site. Analysis can therefore be carried out either in situ or on scattered fragments.

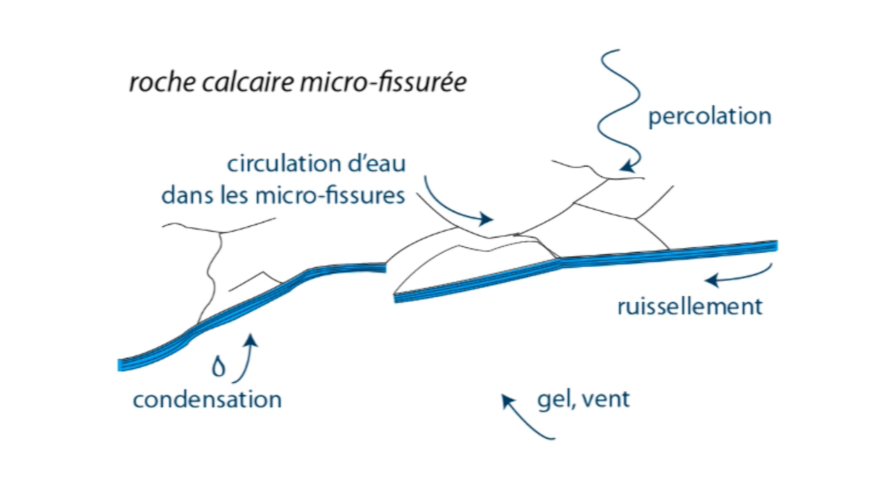
Mechanical wear of the walls of a speleothem

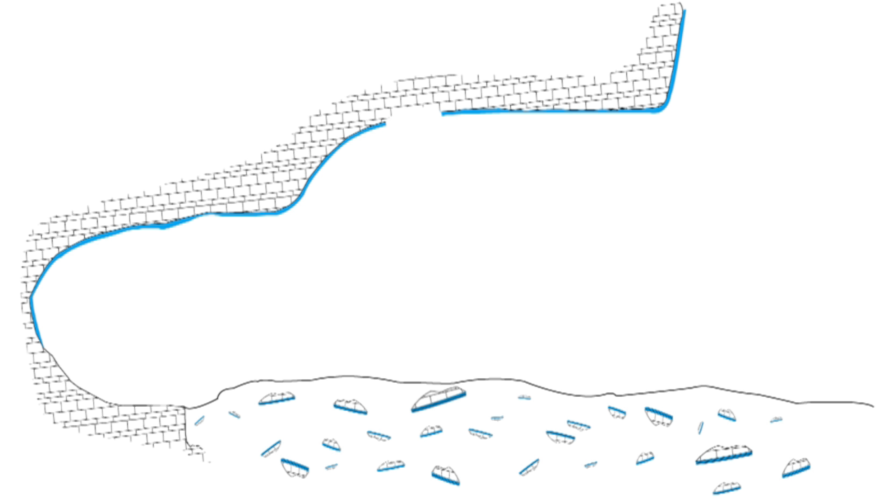
Fragments embedded in archaeological layers

This is a relative dating method, similar to dendrochronology with tree rings. It allows for unparalleled temporal resolution for the Paleolithic period, reaching sub-annual accuracy. Resolving the soot films requires microscopic analysis supplemented by manual digitisation of the samples into a kind of barcode.

In complex cases like the Mandrin cave, the analysed samples must then be matched with the layers. This necessitates recalibrating numerous samples to establish a consistent chronological continuity across all samples within the layer.

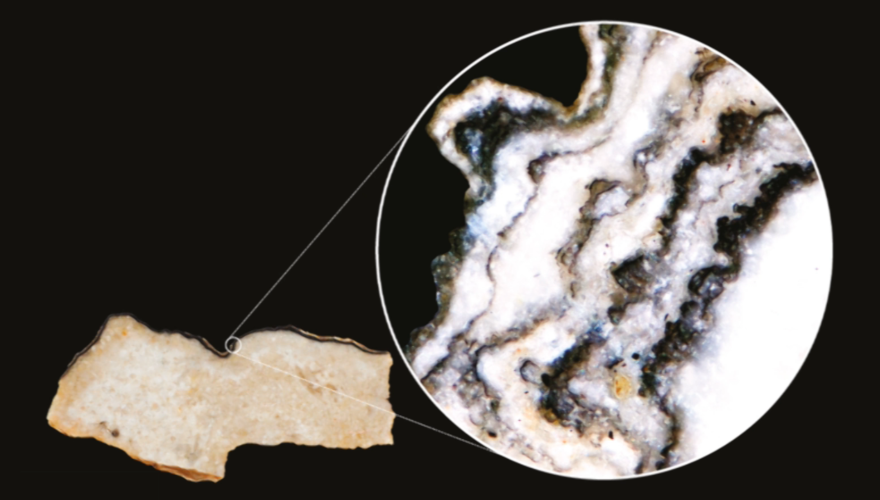
A fragment of wall resolved under a microscope, showing the succession of soot films and calcareous concretions visible on a thin slice studied for dating.

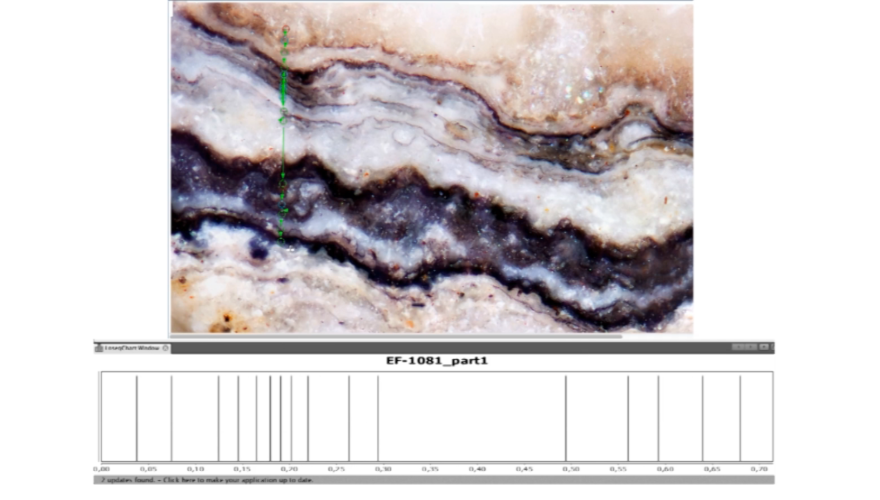
Digitisation of soot films into barcodes

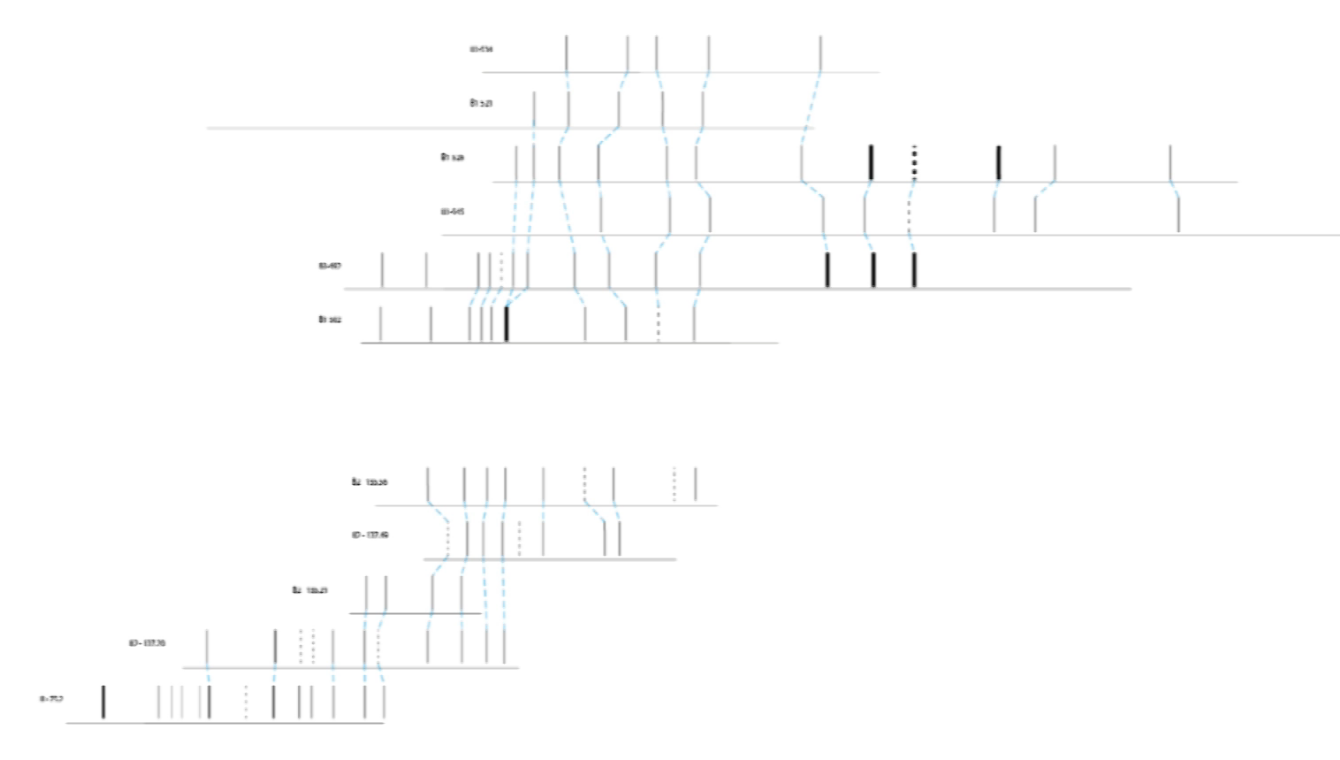
Barcodes of all samples

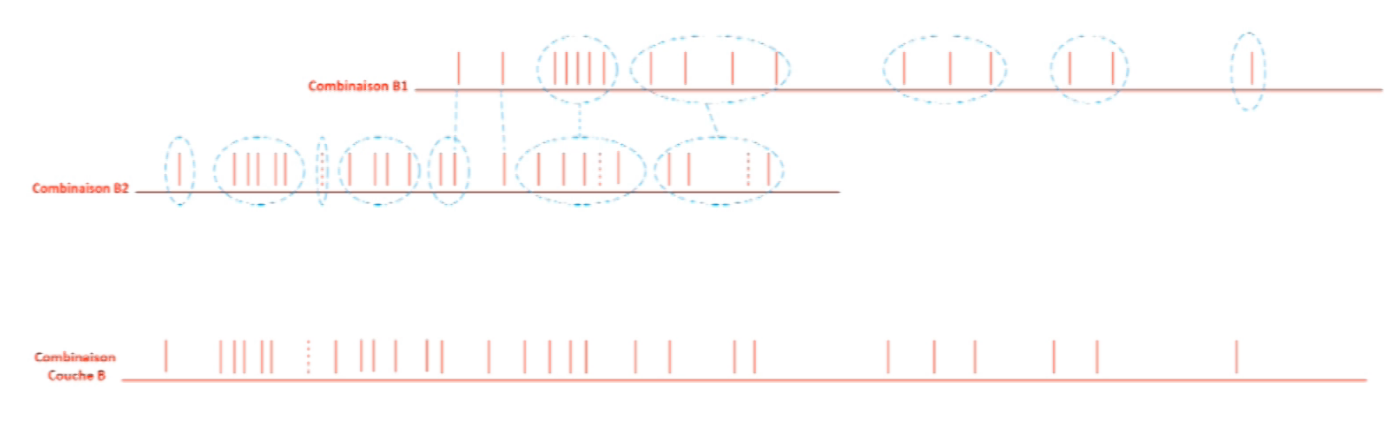
Barcode alignment

== Experimental approach ==
To calibrate the measurements of soot deposits, several teams have experimented with fires under different conditions, notably the CarMoThaP and ExTraS projects. CarMoThaP (Caractérisation et Modélisation des Thermo-altérations et des résidus de combustion sur les Parois [Characterisation and Modelling of Thermal Alterations and Combustion Residues on Walls]) is motivated by the study of the Chauvet Cave.

ExTraS (Experiments on Traces of Soot), on the other hand, is being conducted in parallel with the dating of the Mandrin Cave. ExTraS focused on verifying the impact of various factors on the formation and preservation of the deposits: the nature of the fuel (wood, bones, animal fat), surface orientation, rock surface condition, meteorological conditions, and seasons. The experimental setup consisted of a portable stove, coupled with a flexible chimney allowing targeting of a specific point on the wall, and was installed at an unexcavated site within the Mandrin Cave. The analyses included macroscopic observations, microscopic views of sections, Raman microspectrometry analyses of the samples, and colorimetric measurements of the deposits on the walls. They all confirmed the similarity of the experimental productions to the collected prehistoric samples.

== See also ==
Chronological dating
