= Church of St. Martin in Valaurie =

St. Martin's Church in Valaurie
- Église Saint-Martin de Valaurie
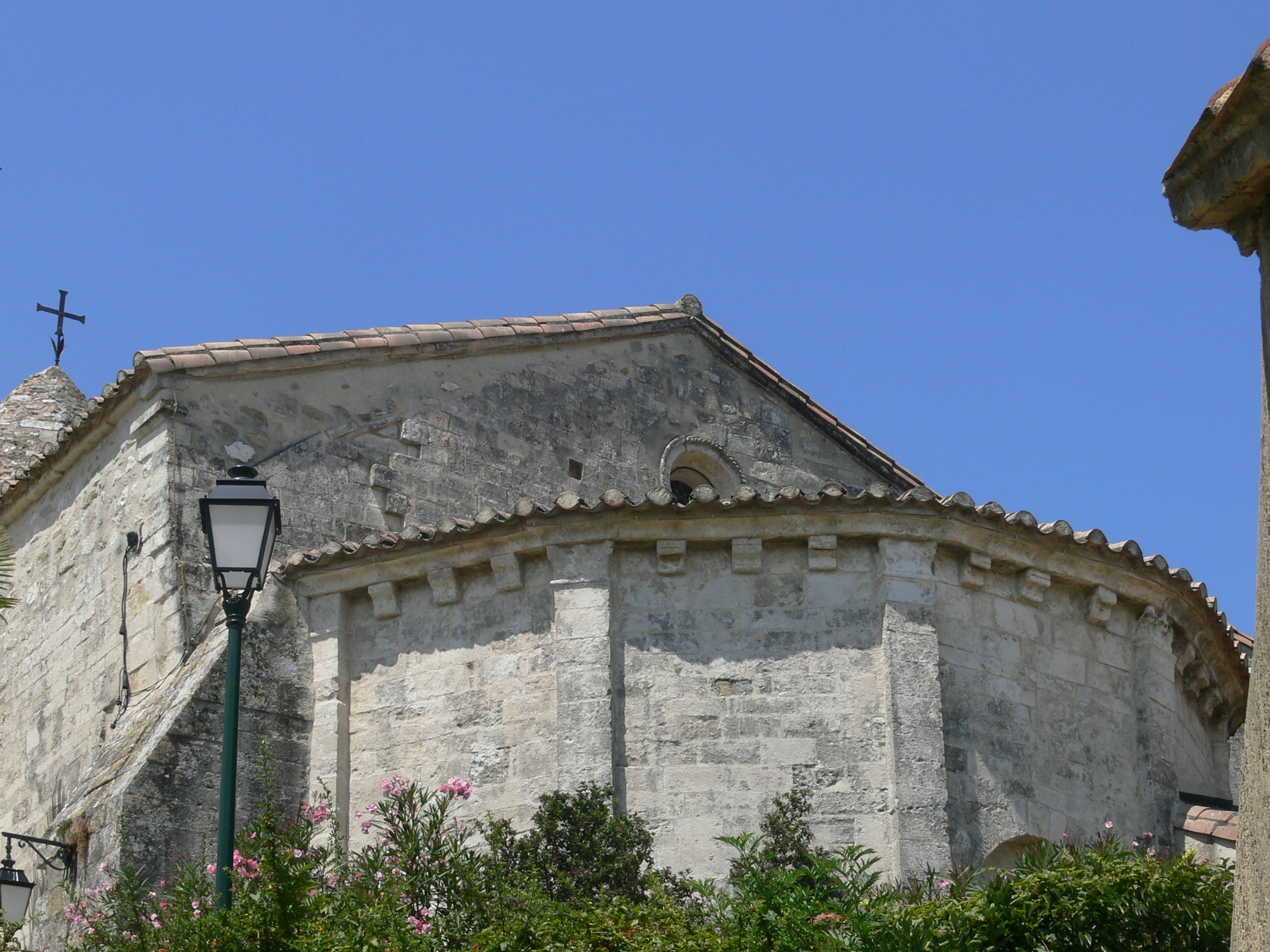
- St. Martin's Church
- Interactive map of the St. Martin's Church in Valaurie area

General information
- Type: Church
- Architectural style: Romanesque
- Coordinates: 44.421335°N 4.813273°E
- Construction started: Twelfth Century

St. Martin's Church in Valaurie (in French, Église Saint-Martin de Valaurie) is a Romanesque church located in Valaurie in the French department of Drôme and the Rhône-Alpes region of France.

== History ==
The church dates from the second century. Yet its first foundations date from the fifth century. This parish church was also a place of worship of the priory near the village, just outside Valaurie. The entire building was damaged numerous times, notably by an earthquake in 1934 and during World War II, when the bell was cracked. Its condition has already resulted in several phases of work. The bell on the tower was financed by the Fondation du Patrimoine (Heritage Foundation), up to 11,865 euros.

This church is registered under French Historic Monuments since July 17, 1926.

== Architecture ==
The church is in the Provençal Romanesque style with a semicircular apse. It measures 7.48 metres (24.5 ft) wide and 9.80 metres (32.2 ft) long, with a height of 21.75 metres (71.4 ft).

It is one of the few examples in the region of Tricastin to have an advanced front tower, offering a porch for the main entrance to the vault . It ends with a stone roof pyramid. The Nave of the building has 3 bays. The apse has the distinction of having a semicircular form inside and pentagonal form outside.
