= Saint-Pantaléon-les-Vignes =

- Commune
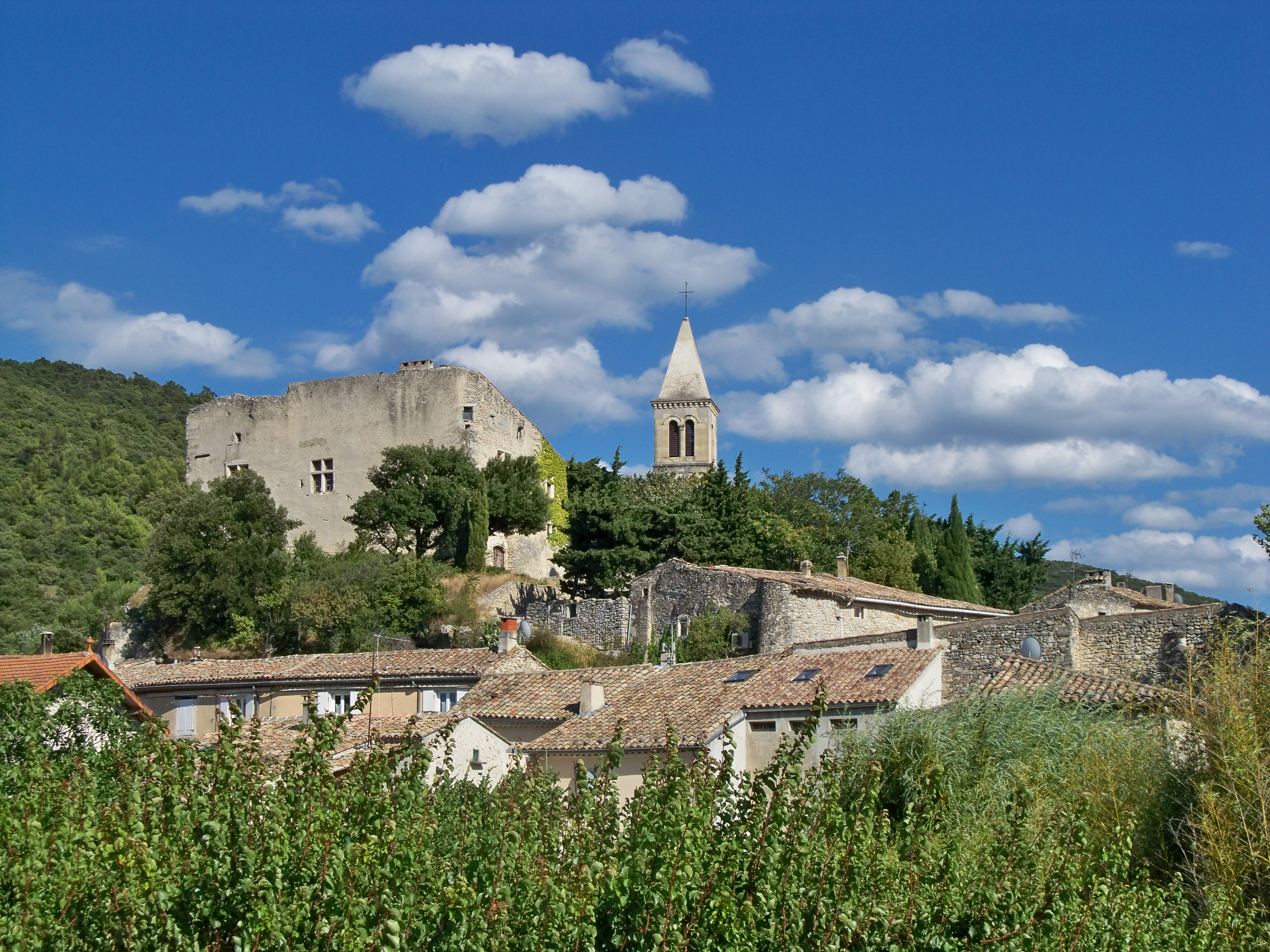
- A general view of Saint-Pantaléon-les-Vignes

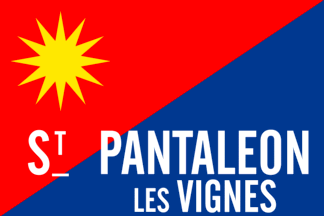
- Flag Coat of arms
- Location of Saint-Pantaléon-les-Vignes
- Location within France Location within Auvergne-Rhône-Alpes
- Coordinates: 44°23′57″N 5°02′35″E
- Country: France
- Region: Auvergne-Rhône-Alpes
- Department: Drôme
- Arrondissement: Nyons
- Canton: Grignan

Government
  - Mayor (2020–2026): Céline Lascombes
- Area^{1}: 8.31 km^{2} (3.21 sq mi)
- Elevation: 250 m (820 ft)
- Highest elevation: 526 m (1,726 ft)
- Lowest elevation: 260 m (850 ft)
- Population (2023): 393
  - Density: 47.3/km^{2} (122/sq mi)
- Time zone: UTC+01:00 (CET)
  - Summer (DST): UTC+02:00 (CEST)
- INSEE/Postal code: 26322 /26770
- ^{1} French Land Register data, which excludes lakes, ponds, glaciers > 1 km^{2} (0.386 sq mi or 247 acres) and river estuaries.

Saint-Pantaléon-les-Vignes (French pronunciation: [sɛ̃ pɑ̃taleɔ̃ le viɲ]; Occitan: Sant Pantali) is a commune in the Drôme department in southeastern France.

== Population ==
Historical population
Year	Pop.	±% p.a.
1968	234	—
1975	259	+1.46%
1982	287	+1.48%
1990	319	+1.33%
1999	305	−0.50%
2007	433	+4.48%
2012	421	−0.56%
2017	441	+0.93%
2023	393	−1.90%
Source: INSEE

== See also ==
- Communes of the Drôme department
