= Les Granges-Gontardes =

- Commune
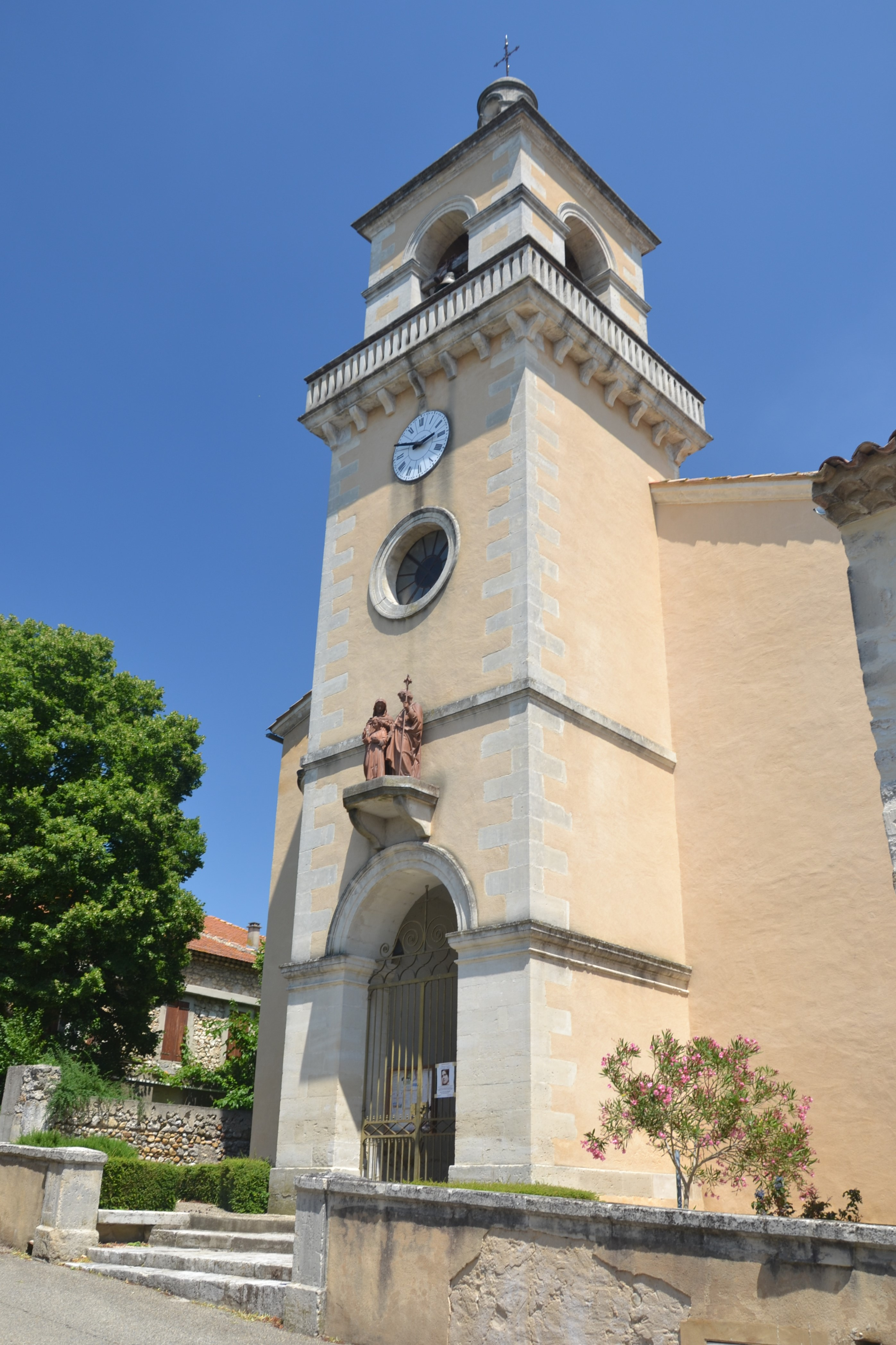
- The church in Les Granges-Gontardes
- Location of Les Granges-Gontardes
- Location within France Location within Auvergne-Rhône-Alpes
- Coordinates: 44°25′00″N 4°45′50″E
- Country: France
- Region: Auvergne-Rhône-Alpes
- Department: Drôme
- Arrondissement: Nyons
- Canton: Grignan

Government
  - Mayor (2020–2026): Hélène Mouly
- Area^{1}: 7.26 km^{2} (2.80 sq mi)
- Highest elevation: 175 m (574 ft)
- Lowest elevation: 60 m (200 ft)
- Population (2023): 698
  - Density: 96.1/km^{2} (249/sq mi)
- Time zone: UTC+01:00 (CET)
  - Summer (DST): UTC+02:00 (CEST)
- INSEE/Postal code: 26145 /26290
- ^{1} French Land Register data, which excludes lakes, ponds, glaciers > 1 km^{2} (0.386 sq mi or 247 acres) and river estuaries.

Les Granges-Gontardes (French pronunciation: [le ɡʁɑ̃ʒ ɡɔ̃taʁd]; Occitan: Lei Granjas Gontardas) is a commune in the Drôme department in southeastern France.

== Population ==
Historical population
Year	Pop.	±% p.a.
1968	304	—
1975	302	−0.09%
1982	411	+4.50%
1990	511	+2.76%
1999	559	+1.00%
2007	578	+0.42%
2012	561	−0.60%
2017	643	+2.77%
2023	698	+1.38%
Source: INSEE

== See also ==
- Communes of the Drôme department
