= Canton of Grignan =

Canton of France

Coordinates: 44.42°N 4.91°E

The canton of Grignan is an administrative division of the Drôme department, southeastern France. Its borders were modified at the French canton reorganisation which came into effect in March 2015. Its seat is in Grignan.

It consists of the following communes:

1. La Baume-de-Transit
2. Bouchet
3. Chamaret
4. Chantemerle-lès-Grignan
5. Colonzelle
6. Donzère
7. Les Granges-Gontardes
8. Grignan
9. Malataverne
10. Montbrison-sur-Lez
11. Montjoyer
12. Montségur-sur-Lauzon
13. Le Pègue
14. Réauville
15. Roussas
16. Rousset-les-Vignes
17. Saint-Pantaléon-les-Vignes
18. Salles-sous-Bois
19. Taulignan
20. Tulette
21. Valaurie
