= Antoine Penchenier =

French physician

Antoine Penchenier, or Penchinier, (? , Montélimar, Dauphiné – 1761, Donzère), was an 18th-century French physician.

== Biography ==
Born in Montélimar, he studied medicine in Montpellier where he held a practise. Penchenier wrote the article Goutte (gout) for volume VII of the Encyclopédie by Diderot and D'Alembert, in which he denounced in the same time charlatans and their powders of orvietan.

After his death, his widow, Delphine Rapin, married Vincent-Amable de Roqueplane, baron de Lestrade, from Montélimar.

== Bibliography ==
- Frank Arthur Kafker, The encyclopedists as individuals: a biographical dictionary of the authors of the Encyclopédie, Oxford, Studies on Voltaire and the eighteenth Century, 1988, p. 295-6. ISBN 0-7294-0368-8
