= Rousset-les-Vignes =

- Commune
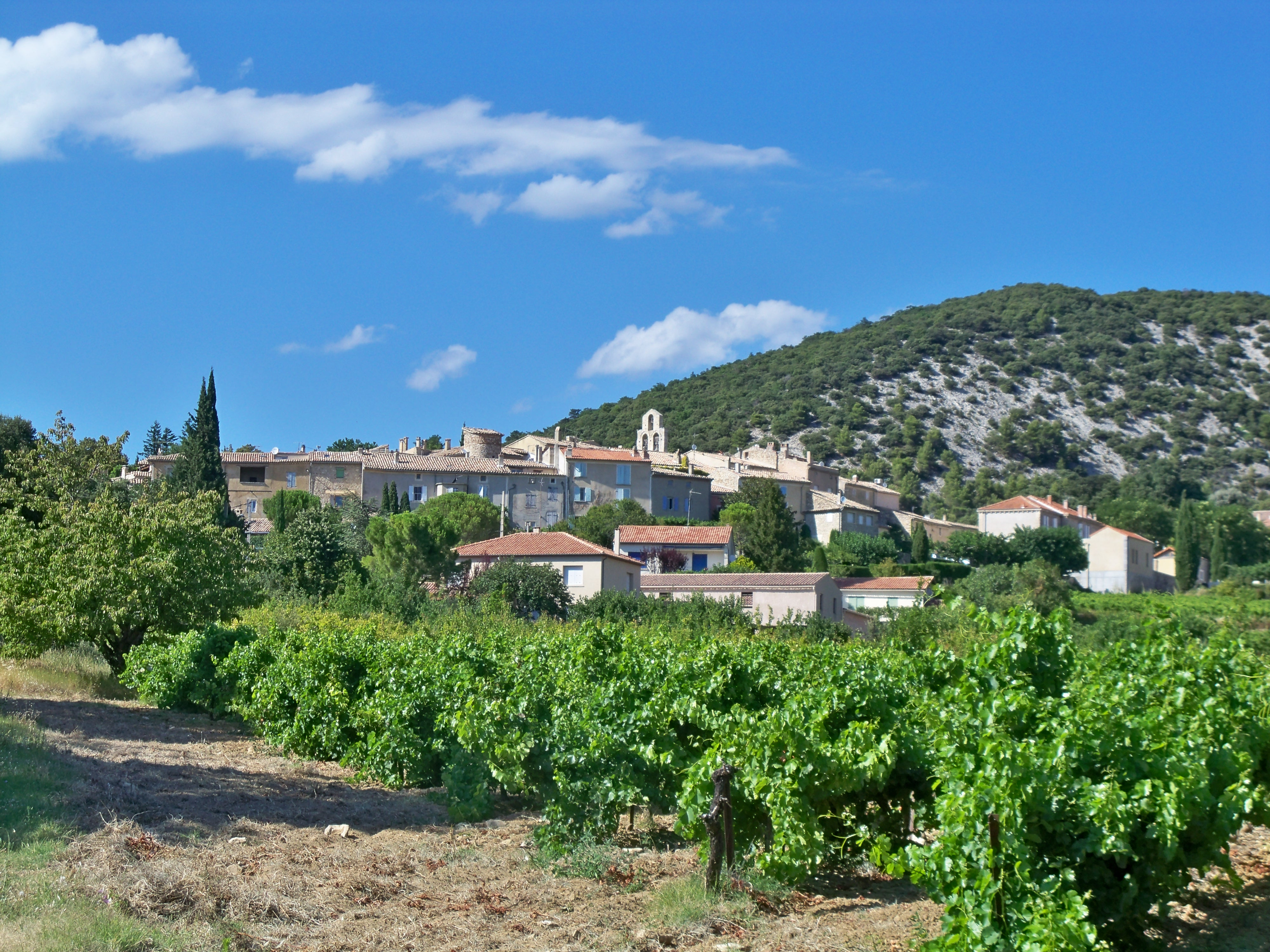
- A view of the village of Rousset-les-Vignes

- Coat of arms
- Location of Rousset-les-Vignes
- Location within France Location within Auvergne-Rhône-Alpes
- Coordinates: 44°25′09″N 5°03′43″E
- Country: France
- Region: Auvergne-Rhône-Alpes
- Department: Drôme
- Arrondissement: Nyons
- Canton: Grignan

Government
  - Mayor (2020–2026): Jacques Gigondan
- Area^{1}: 15.45 km^{2} (5.97 sq mi)
- Highest elevation: 1,305 m (4,281 ft)
- Lowest elevation: 280 m (920 ft)
- Population (2023): 271
  - Density: 17.5/km^{2} (45.4/sq mi)
- Time zone: UTC+01:00 (CET)
  - Summer (DST): UTC+02:00 (CEST)
- INSEE/Postal code: 26285 /26770
- ^{1} French Land Register data, which excludes lakes, ponds, glaciers > 1 km^{2} (0.386 sq mi or 247 acres) and river estuaries.

Rousset-les-Vignes (French pronunciation: [ʁusɛ le viɲ]; Occitan: Rosset) is a commune in the Drôme department in southeastern France.

== Population ==
Historical population
| Year | Pop. | ±% p.a. |
|---|---|---|
| 1968 | 228 | — |
| 1975 | 216 | −0.77% |
| 1982 | 257 | +2.51% |
| 1990 | 257 | +0.00% |
| 1999 | 254 | −0.13% |
| 2007 | 289 | +1.63% |
| 2012 | 284 | −0.35% |
| 2017 | 289 | +0.35% |
| 2023 | 271 | −1.07% |
Source: INSEE

== See also ==
- Communes of the Drôme department
