= Taulignan =

- Commune
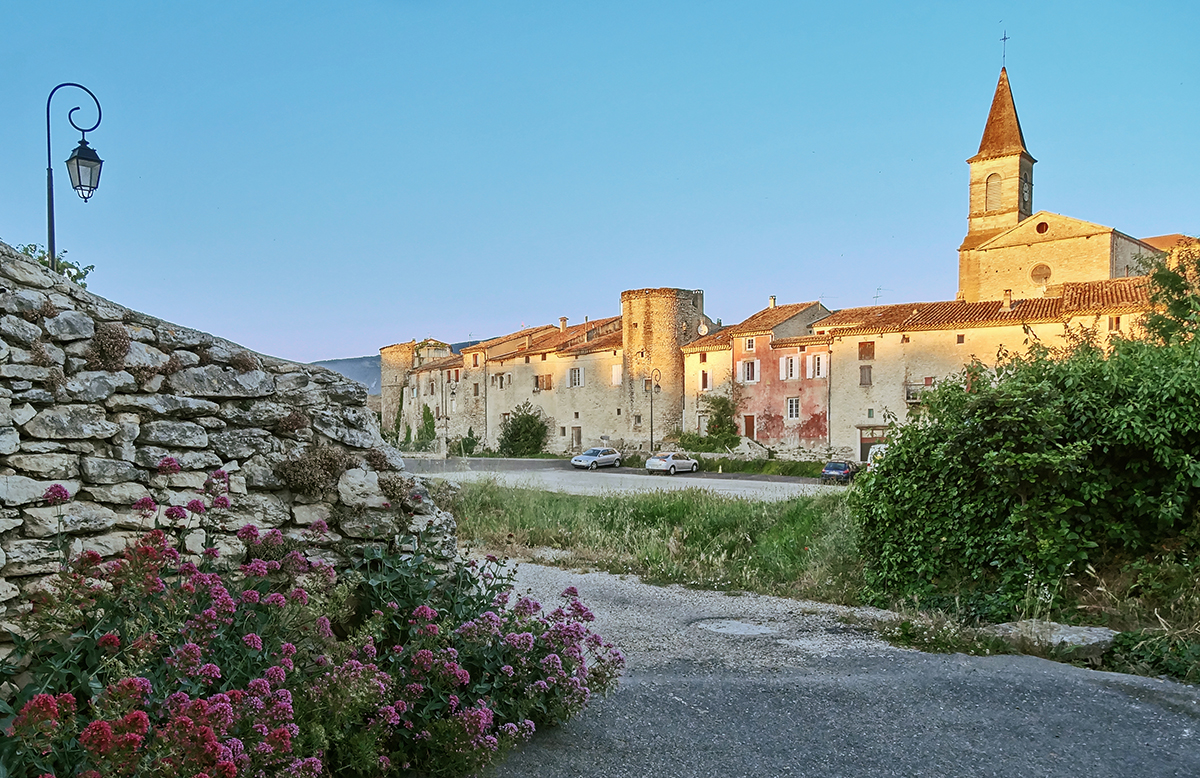
- A general view of Taulignan

- Coat of arms
- Location of Taulignan
- Location within France Location within Auvergne-Rhône-Alpes
- Coordinates: 44°26′41″N 4°58′54″E
- Country: France
- Region: Auvergne-Rhône-Alpes
- Department: Drôme
- Arrondissement: Nyons
- Canton: Grignan

Government
  - Mayor (2020–2026): Jean-Louis Martin
- Area^{1}: 34.65 km^{2} (13.38 sq mi)
- Highest elevation: 760 m (2,490 ft)
- Lowest elevation: 203 m (666 ft)
- Population (2023): 1,627
  - Density: 46.96/km^{2} (121.6/sq mi)
- Time zone: UTC+01:00 (CET)
  - Summer (DST): UTC+02:00 (CEST)
- INSEE/Postal code: 26348 /26770
- ^{1} French Land Register data, which excludes lakes, ponds, glaciers > 1 km^{2} (0.386 sq mi or 247 acres) and river estuaries.

Taulignan (French pronunciation: [toliɲɑ̃]; Occitan: Taulinhan) is a commune in the Drôme department in southeastern France.

== Population ==
Historical population
Year	Pop.	±% p.a.
1968	1,199	—
1975	1,202	+0.04%
1982	1,419	+2.40%
1990	1,586	+1.40%
1999	1,571	−0.11%
2007	1,589	+0.14%
2012	1,650	+0.76%
2017	1,677	+0.33%
2023	1,627	−0.50%
Source: INSEE

== See also ==
- Communes of the Drôme department
