= Montségur-sur-Lauzon =

- Commune
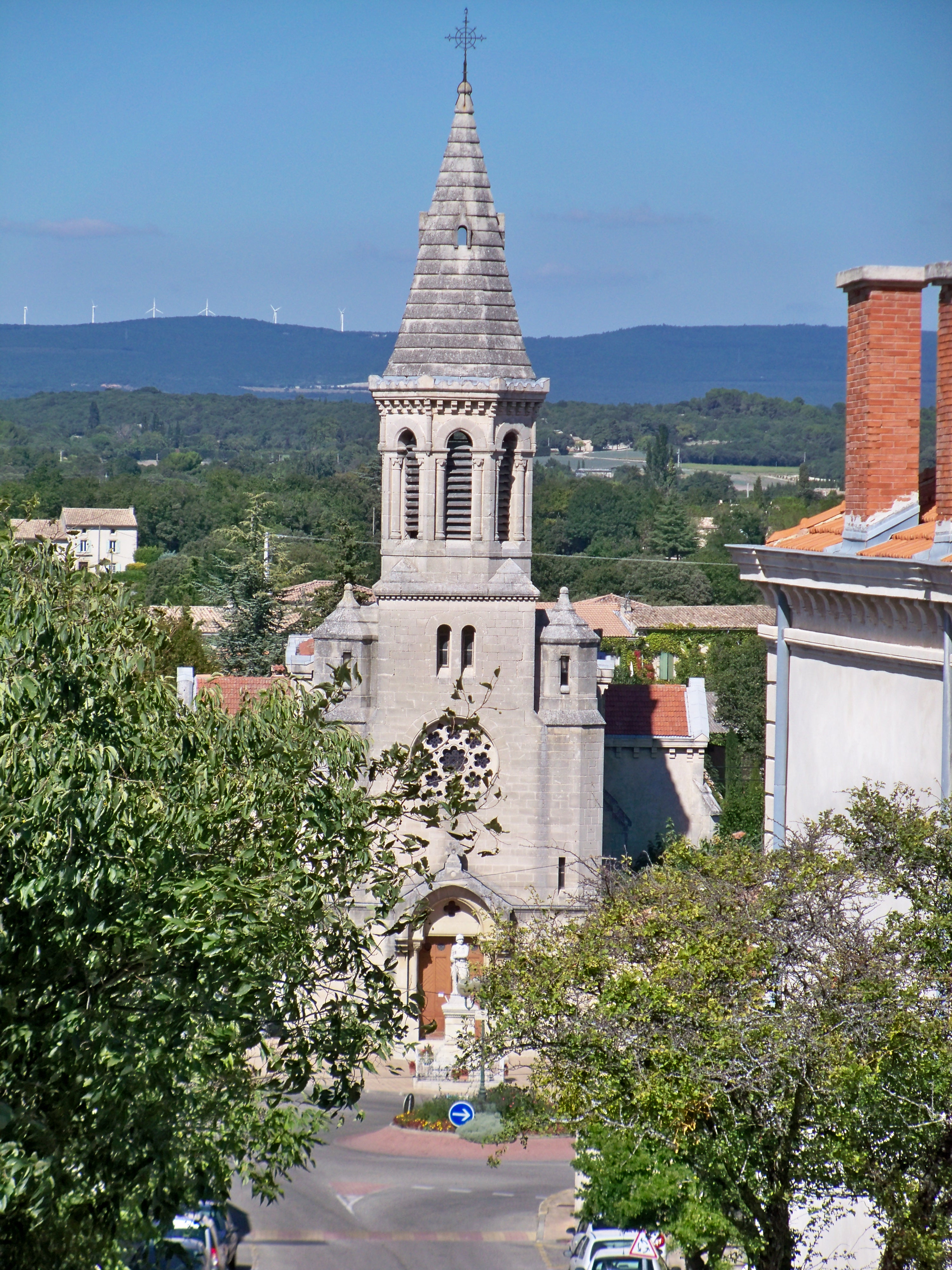
- The church of Montségur-sur-Lauzon

- Coat of arms
- Location of Montségur-sur-Lauzon
- Location within France Location within Auvergne-Rhône-Alpes
- Coordinates: 44°21′41″N 4°51′37″E
- Country: France
- Region: Auvergne-Rhône-Alpes
- Department: Drôme
- Arrondissement: Nyons
- Canton: Grignan

Government
  - Mayor (2020–2026): Yves Feydy
- Area^{1}: 18.24 km^{2} (7.04 sq mi)
- Highest elevation: 297 m (974 ft)
- Lowest elevation: 112 m (367 ft)
- Population (2023): 1,359
  - Density: 74.51/km^{2} (193.0/sq mi)
- Time zone: UTC+01:00 (CET)
  - Summer (DST): UTC+02:00 (CEST)
- INSEE/Postal code: 26211 /26130
- ^{1} French Land Register data, which excludes lakes, ponds, glaciers > 1 km^{2} (0.386 sq mi or 247 acres) and river estuaries.

Montségur-sur-Lauzon (French pronunciation: [mɔ̃seɡyʁ syʁ lozɔ̃]; Occitan: Montsegur) is a commune in the Drôme department in southeastern France.

== Population ==
Historical population
Year	Pop.	±% p.a.
1968	654	—
1975	767	+2.30%
1982	925	+2.71%
1990	987	+0.81%
1999	1,029	+0.46%
2007	1,142	+1.31%
2012	1,213	+1.21%
2017	1,312	+1.58%
2023	1,359	+0.59%
Source: INSEE

== See also ==
- Communes of the Drôme department
