= Chamaret =

- Commune
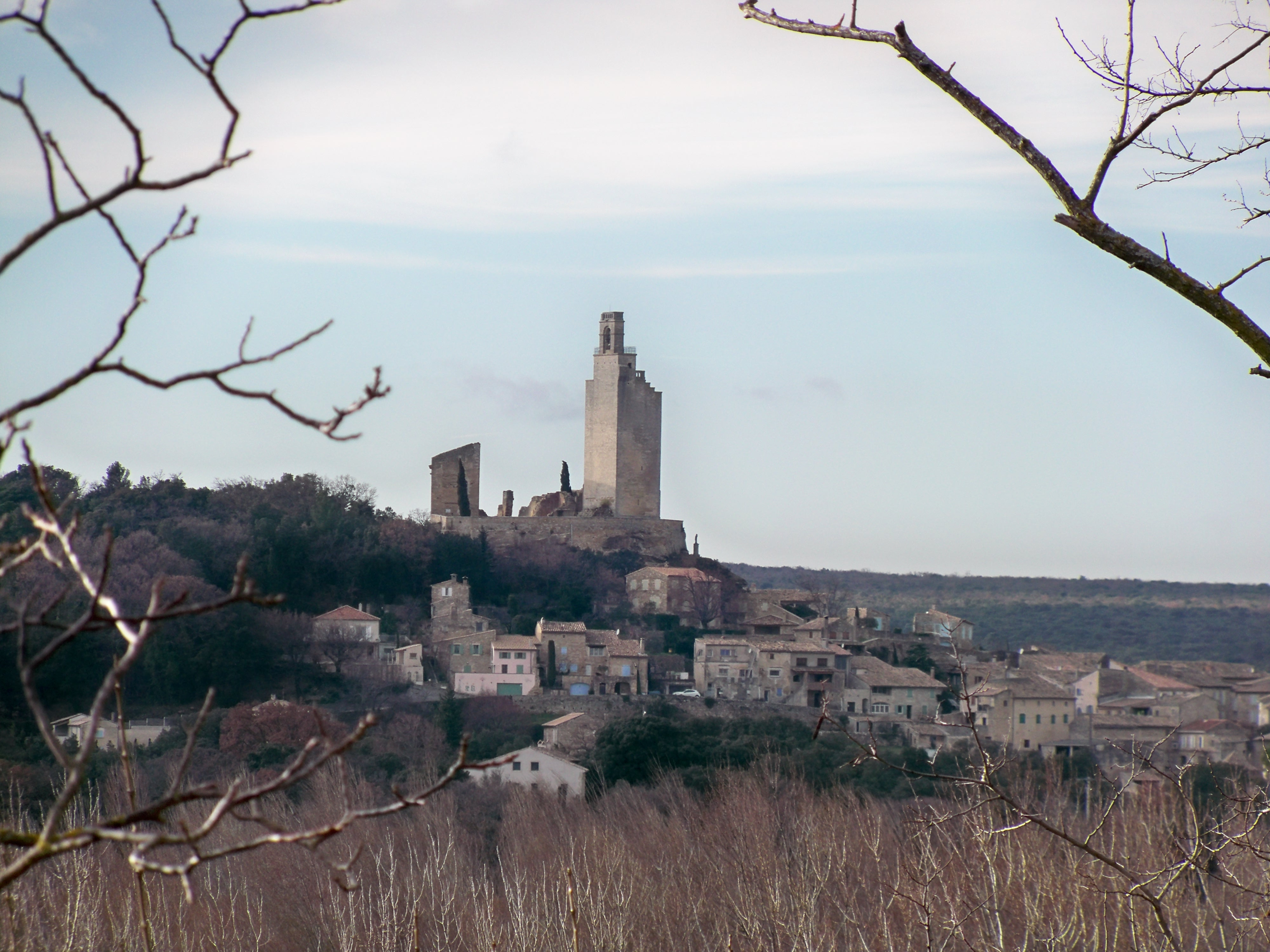
- The tower in Chamaret

- Coat of arms
- Location of Chamaret
- Location within France Location within Auvergne-Rhône-Alpes
- Coordinates: 44°23′50″N 4°53′00″E
- Country: France
- Region: Auvergne-Rhône-Alpes
- Department: Drôme
- Arrondissement: Nyons
- Canton: Grignan

Government
  - Mayor (2020–2026): Maurice Boissout
- Area^{1}: 7.79 km^{2} (3.01 sq mi)
- Highest elevation: 264 m (866 ft)
- Lowest elevation: 135 m (443 ft)
- Population (2023): 542
  - Density: 69.6/km^{2} (180/sq mi)
- Time zone: UTC+01:00 (CET)
  - Summer (DST): UTC+02:00 (CEST)
- INSEE/Postal code: 26070 /26230
- ^{1} French Land Register data, which excludes lakes, ponds, glaciers > 1 km^{2} (0.386 sq mi or 247 acres) and river estuaries.

Chamaret (French pronunciation: [ʃamaʁɛ]) is a commune of the Drôme department in southeastern France.

== Population ==
Historical population
Year	Pop.	±% p.a.
1968	312	—
1975	275	−1.79%
1982	349	+3.46%
1990	455	+3.37%
1999	493	+0.90%
2007	537	+1.07%
2012	556	+0.70%
2017	546	−0.36%
2023	542	−0.12%
Source: INSEE

== See also ==
- Communes of the Drôme department
