= Réauville =

- Commune
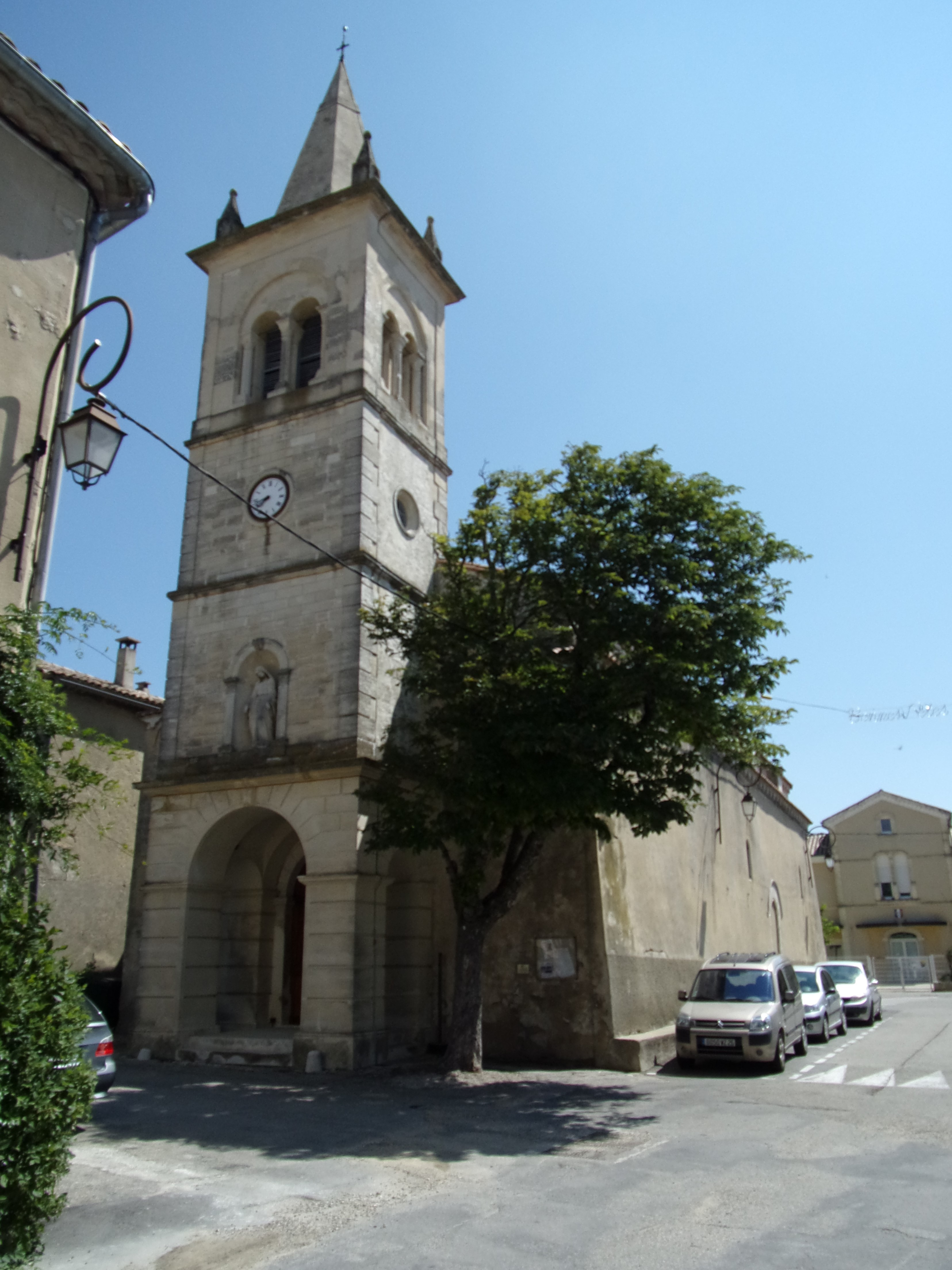
- The church in Réauville

- Coat of arms
- Location of Réauville
- Location within France Location within Auvergne-Rhône-Alpes
- Coordinates: 44°26′43″N 4°50′42″E
- Country: France
- Region: Auvergne-Rhône-Alpes
- Department: Drôme
- Arrondissement: Nyons
- Canton: Grignan

Government
  - Mayor (2020–2026): Norbert Perrin
- Area^{1}: 18.22 km^{2} (7.03 sq mi)
- Elevation: 243 m (797 ft)
- Highest elevation: 372 m (1,220 ft)
- Lowest elevation: 117 m (384 ft)
- Population (2023): 389
  - Density: 21.4/km^{2} (55.3/sq mi)
- Time zone: UTC+01:00 (CET)
  - Summer (DST): UTC+02:00 (CEST)
- INSEE/Postal code: 26261 /26230
- ^{1} French Land Register data, which excludes lakes, ponds, glaciers > 1 km^{2} (0.386 sq mi or 247 acres) and river estuaries.

Réauville (French pronunciation: [ʁeovil]; Occitan: Reauvila) is a commune in the Drôme department in southeastern France.

== Population ==
Historical population
Year	Pop.	±% p.a.
1968	167	—
1975	166	−0.09%
1982	243	+5.59%
1990	315	+3.30%
1999	336	+0.72%
2007	371	+1.25%
2012	380	+0.48%
2017	387	+0.37%
2023	389	+0.09%
Source: INSEE

== See also ==
- Aiguebelle Abbey
- Communes of the Drôme department
- Albert Severin Roche, WW1 Legion of Honour recipient.
