= Chantemerle-lès-Grignan =

- Commune
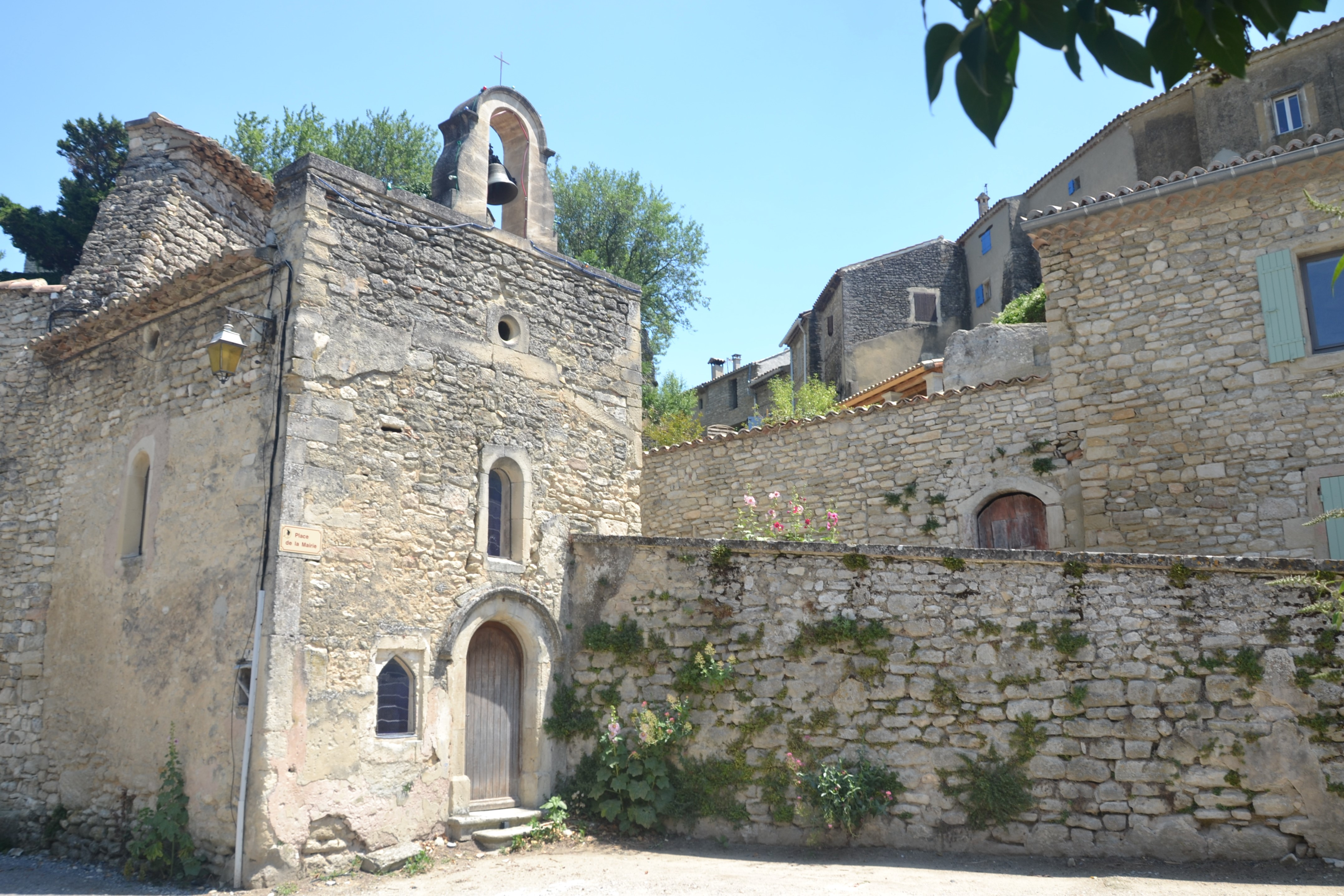
- The chapel of Chantemerle-lès-Grignan
- Location of Chantemerle-lès-Grignan
- Location within France Location within Auvergne-Rhône-Alpes
- Coordinates: 44°24′14″N 4°50′10″E
- Country: France
- Region: Auvergne-Rhône-Alpes
- Department: Drôme
- Arrondissement: Nyons
- Canton: Grignan

Government
  - Mayor (2021–2026): Jean-Luc Bodin
- Area^{1}: 9.82 km^{2} (3.79 sq mi)
- Highest elevation: 351 m (1,152 ft)
- Lowest elevation: 99 m (325 ft)
- Population (2023): 246
  - Density: 25.1/km^{2} (64.9/sq mi)
- Time zone: UTC+01:00 (CET)
  - Summer (DST): UTC+02:00 (CEST)
- INSEE/Postal code: 26073 /26230
- ^{1} French Land Register data, which excludes lakes, ponds, glaciers > 1 km^{2} (0.386 sq mi or 247 acres) and river estuaries.

Chantemerle-lès-Grignan is a commune in the Drôme department in southeastern France.

== Population ==
Historical population
Year	Pop.	±% p.a.
1968	115	—
1975	94	−2.84%
1982	114	+2.79%
1990	180	+5.88%
1999	177	−0.19%
2007	220	+2.76%
2012	242	+1.92%
2017	251	+0.73%
2023	246	−0.33%
Source: INSEE

== See also ==
- Communes of the Drôme department
