= Salles-sous-Bois =

- Commune
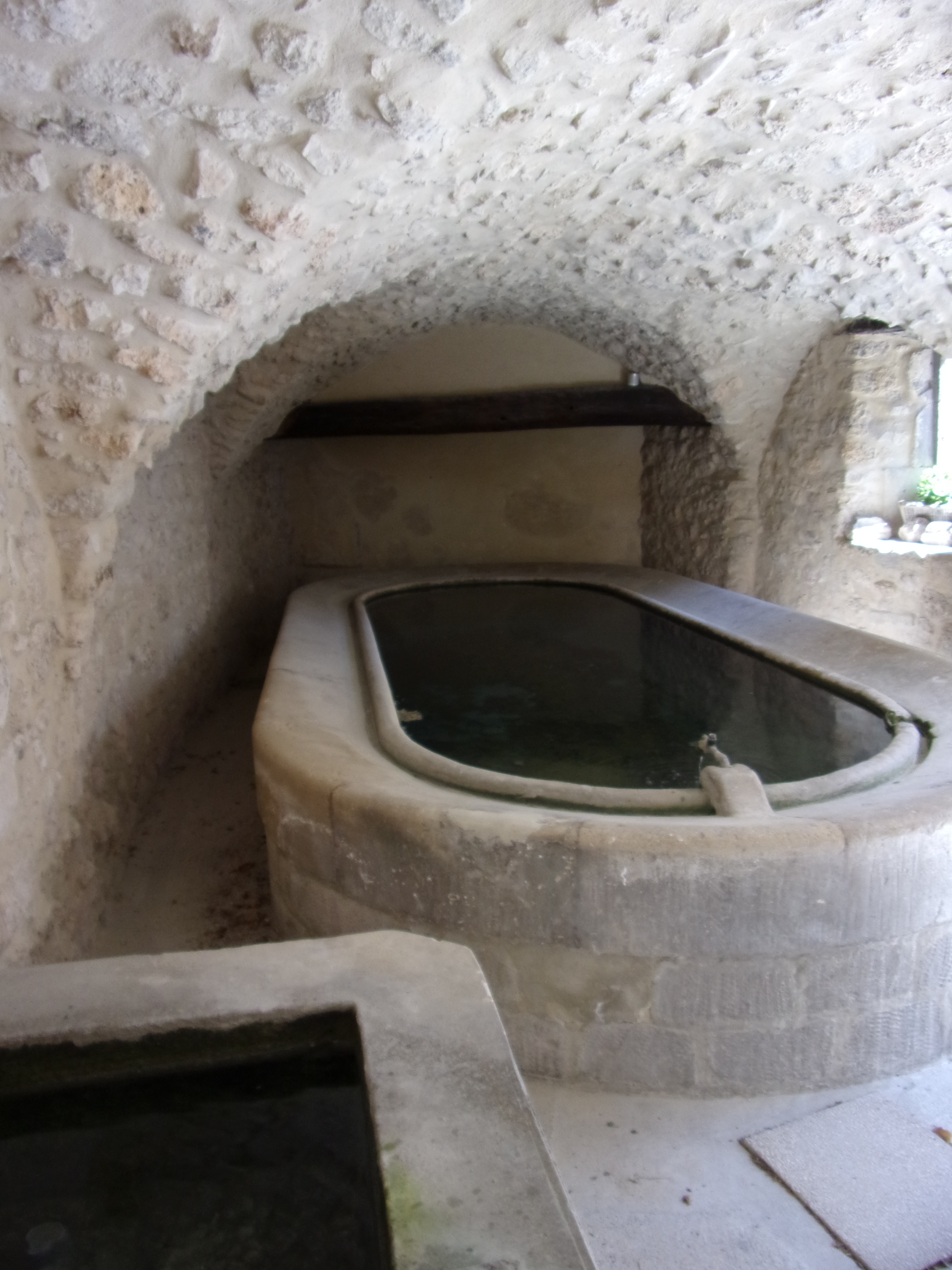
- The covered wash house of Salles-sous-Bois
- Location of Salles-sous-Bois
- Location within France Location within Auvergne-Rhône-Alpes
- Coordinates: 44°27′07″N 4°56′06″E
- Country: France
- Region: Auvergne-Rhône-Alpes
- Department: Drôme
- Arrondissement: Nyons
- Canton: Grignan

Government
  - Mayor (2020–2026): Bernard Doutres
- Area^{1}: 9.5 km^{2} (3.7 sq mi)
- Elevation: 244 m (801 ft)
- Highest elevation: 507 m (1,663 ft)
- Lowest elevation: 215 m (705 ft)
- Population (2023): 222
  - Density: 23/km^{2} (61/sq mi)
- Time zone: UTC+01:00 (CET)
  - Summer (DST): UTC+02:00 (CEST)
- INSEE/Postal code: 26335 /26770
- ^{1} French Land Register data, which excludes lakes, ponds, glaciers > 1 km^{2} (0.386 sq mi or 247 acres) and river estuaries.

Salles-sous-Bois (French pronunciation: [sal su bwa]; Occitan: Salas) is a commune in the Drôme department in southeastern France.

== Population ==
Historical population
Year	Pop.	±% p.a.
1968	114	—
1975	129	+1.78%
1982	135	+0.65%
1990	146	+0.98%
1999	190	+2.97%
2007	207	+1.08%
2012	182	−2.54%
2017	191	+0.97%
2023	222	+2.54%
Source: INSEE

== See also ==
- Communes of the Drôme department
