= Colonzelle =

- Commune
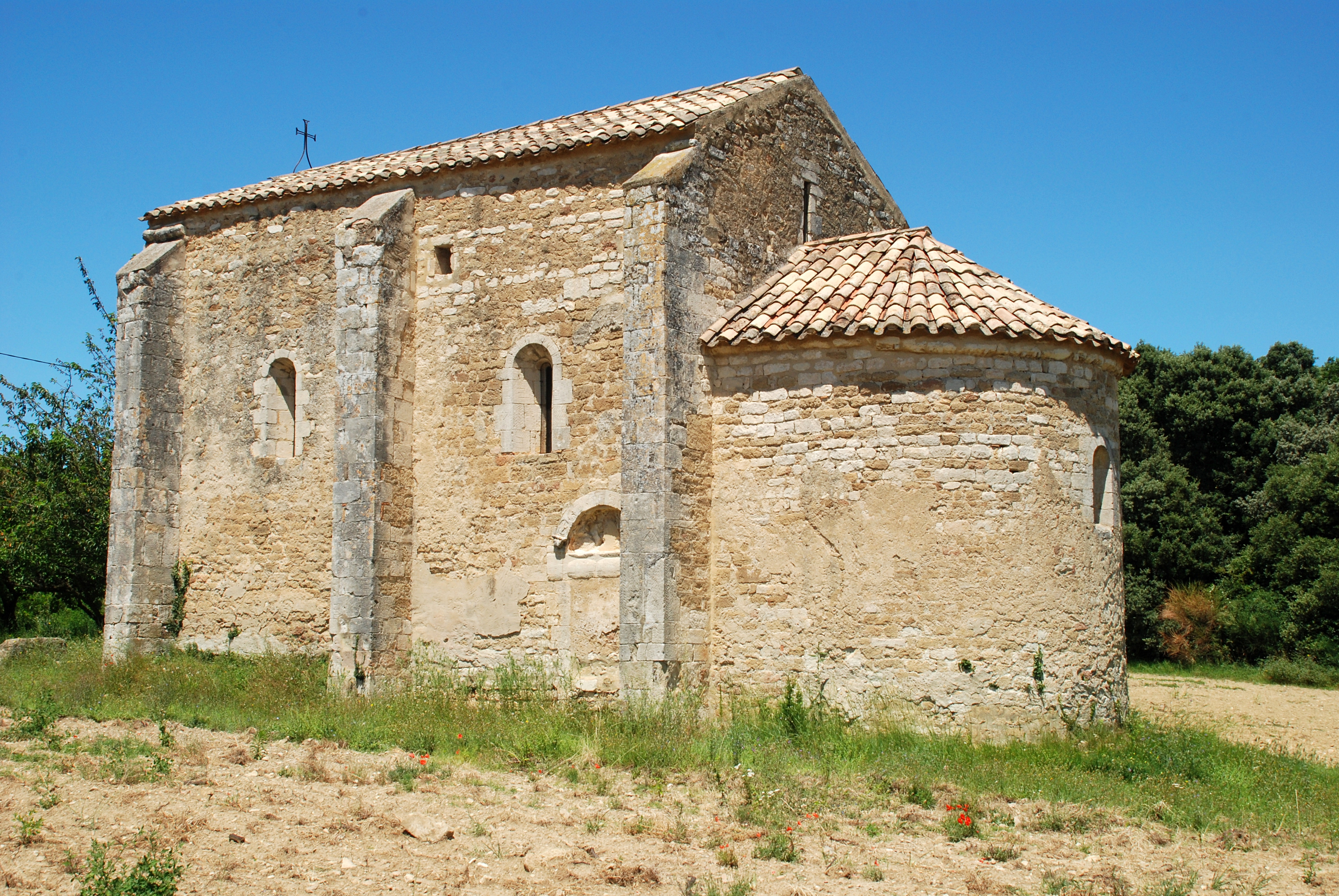
- The church of Saint-Pierre-ès-Liens, in Colonzelle
- Location of Colonzelle
- Location within France Location within Auvergne-Rhône-Alpes
- Coordinates: 44°23′38″N 4°54′04″E
- Country: France
- Region: Auvergne-Rhône-Alpes
- Department: Drôme
- Arrondissement: Nyons
- Canton: Grignan

Government
  - Mayor (2020–2026): Carole Cheyron Deslys
- Area^{1}: 6.06 km^{2} (2.34 sq mi)
- Highest elevation: 204 m (669 ft)
- Lowest elevation: 132 m (433 ft)
- Population (2023): 524
  - Density: 86.5/km^{2} (224/sq mi)
- Time zone: UTC+01:00 (CET)
  - Summer (DST): UTC+02:00 (CEST)
- INSEE/Postal code: 26099 /26230
- ^{1} French Land Register data, which excludes lakes, ponds, glaciers > 1 km^{2} (0.386 sq mi or 247 acres) and river estuaries.

Colonzelle (French pronunciation: [kɔlɔ̃zɛl]; Occitan: Colonzèla) is a commune in the Drôme department in southeastern France.

== Population ==
Historical population
Year	Pop.	±% p.a.
1968	234	—
1975	228	−0.37%
1982	285	+3.24%
1990	397	+4.23%
1999	432	+0.94%
2007	478	+1.27%
2012	479	+0.04%
2017	549	+2.77%
2023	524	−0.77%
Source: INSEE

== See also ==
- Communes of the Drôme department
