= Valaurie =

- Commune
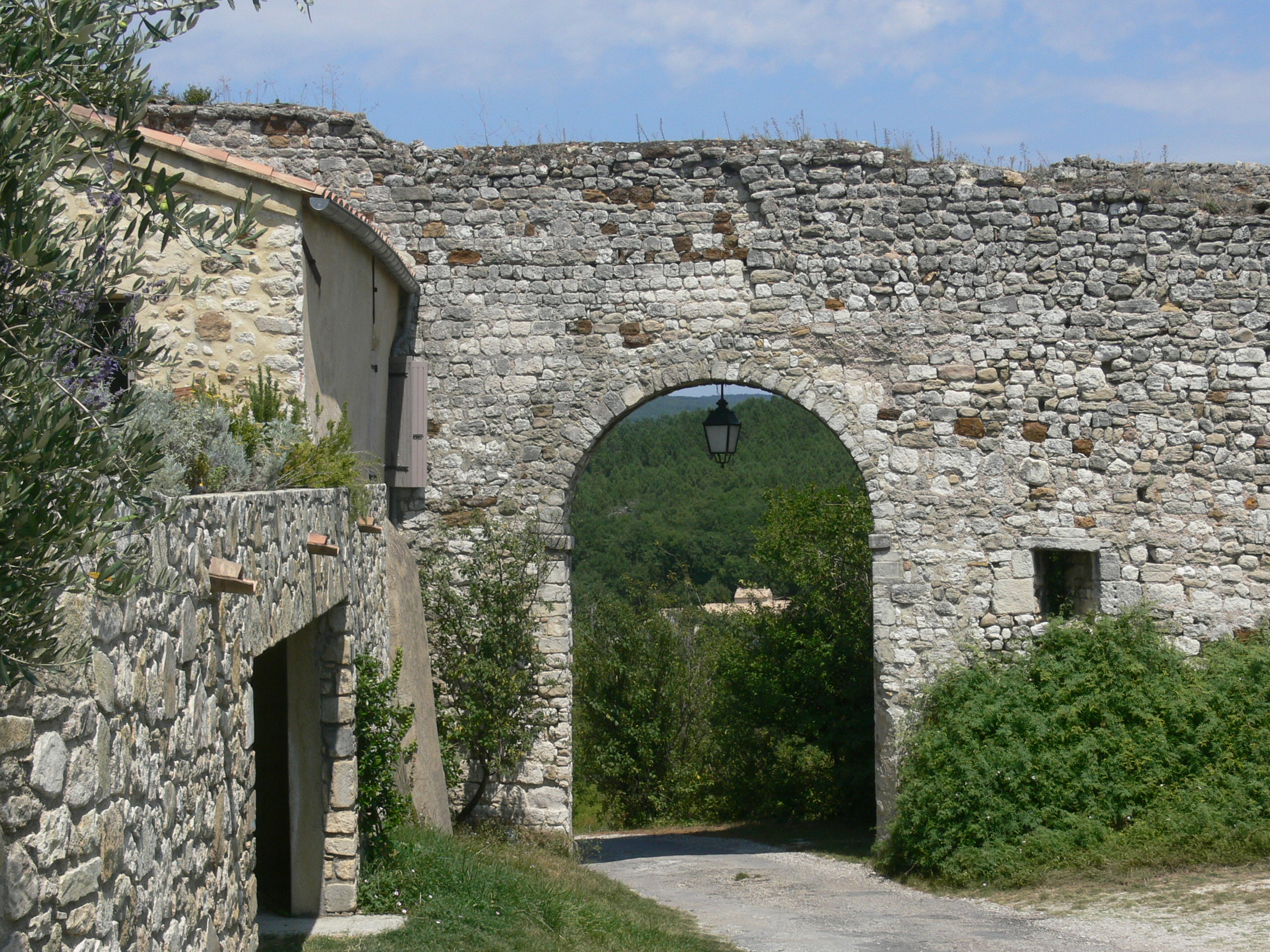
- A rampart entrance in Valaurie
- Location of Valaurie
- Location within France Location within Auvergne-Rhône-Alpes
- Coordinates: 44°25′23″N 4°48′50″E
- Country: France
- Region: Auvergne-Rhône-Alpes
- Department: Drôme
- Arrondissement: Nyons
- Canton: Grignan

Government
  - Mayor (2020–2026): Christian Fau
- Area^{1}: 12.3 km^{2} (4.7 sq mi)
- Elevation: 168 m (551 ft)
- Highest elevation: 290 m (950 ft)
- Lowest elevation: 80 m (260 ft)
- Population (2023): 732
  - Density: 59.5/km^{2} (154/sq mi)
- Time zone: UTC+01:00 (CET)
  - Summer (DST): UTC+02:00 (CEST)
- INSEE/Postal code: 26360 /26230
- ^{1} French Land Register data, which excludes lakes, ponds, glaciers > 1 km^{2} (0.386 sq mi or 247 acres) and river estuaries.

Valaurie (French pronunciation: [valoʁi]) is a commune in the Drôme department in southeastern France. One important landmark is the Church of St. Martin in Valaurie.

== Population ==
Historical population
Year	Pop.	±% p.a.
1968	269	—
1975	278	+0.47%
1982	365	+3.97%
1990	386	+0.70%
1999	508	+3.10%
2007	533	+0.60%
2012	572	+1.42%
2017	593	+0.72%
2023	732	+3.57%
Source: INSEE

== See also ==
- Communes of the Drôme department
