= Donzère =

- Commune
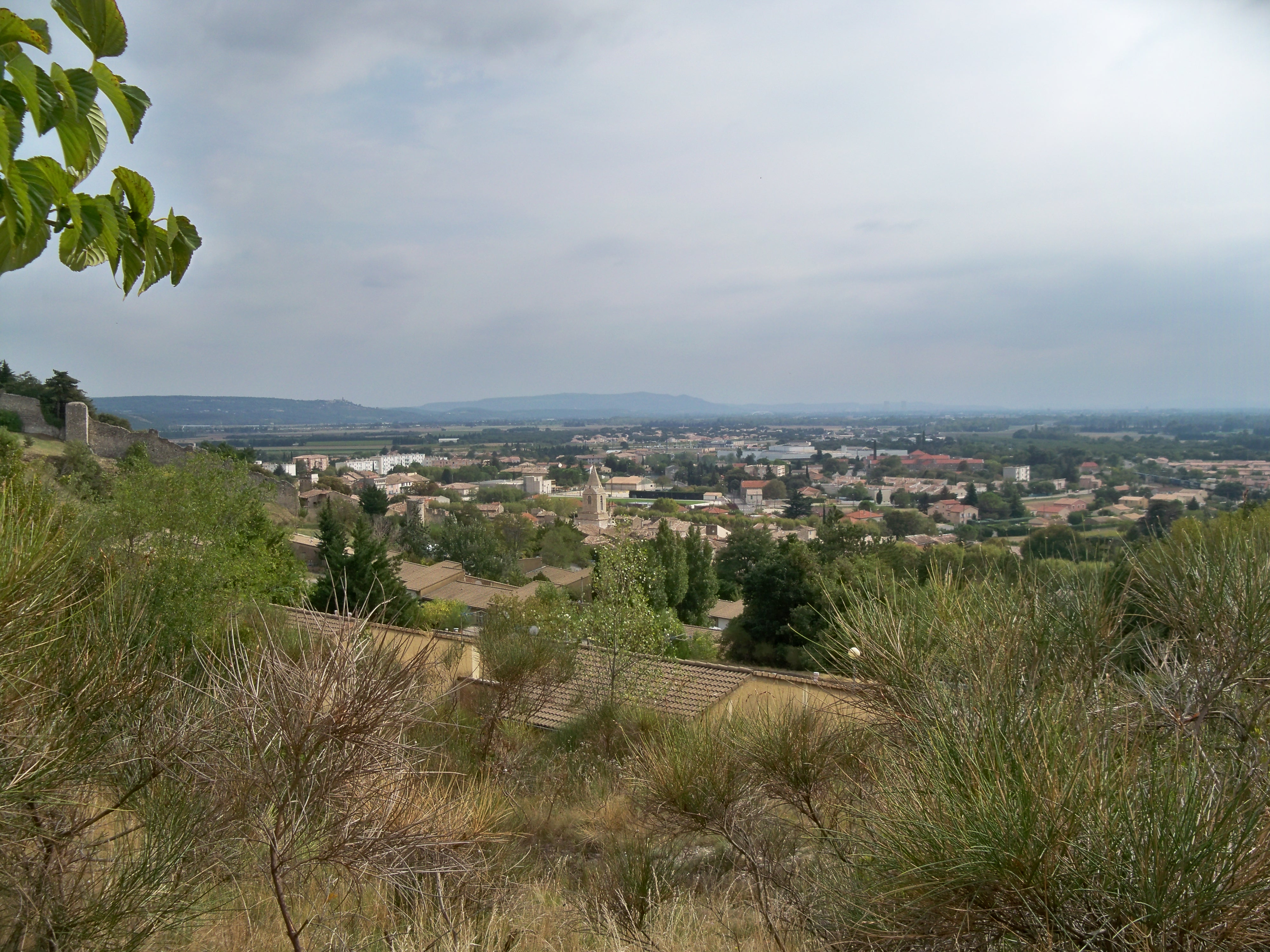
- A general view of Donzère

- Coat of arms
- Location of Donzère
- Location within France Location within Auvergne-Rhône-Alpes
- Coordinates: 44°27′21″N 4°42′34″E
- Country: France
- Region: Auvergne-Rhône-Alpes
- Department: Drôme
- Arrondissement: Nyons
- Canton: Grignan

Government
  - Mayor (2020–2026): Marie Fernandez
- Area^{1}: 32.06 km^{2} (12.38 sq mi)
- Elevation: 64 m (210 ft)
- Highest elevation: 200 m (660 ft)
- Lowest elevation: 54 m (177 ft)
- Population (2023): 6,008
  - Density: 187.4/km^{2} (485.4/sq mi)
- Time zone: UTC+01:00 (CET)
  - Summer (DST): UTC+02:00 (CEST)
- INSEE/Postal code: 26116 /26290
- ^{1} French Land Register data, which excludes lakes, ponds, glaciers > 1 km^{2} (0.386 sq mi or 247 acres) and river estuaries.

Donzère (French pronunciation: [dɔ̃zɛʁ]; Occitan: Donzèra) is a commune of the Drôme department in the Auvergne-Rhône-Alpes region in southeastern France.

It is a town located in the south of Drôme and on the left bank of the Rhône river, next to Montélimar.

== Geography ==
The name of the town usually refers to the Donzère-Mondragon canal, which is an important artificial derivation of the Rhône. Donzère is also known for its gorge, which is the last shrinkage of the Rhône valley before its course joins the Mediterranean Sea.

For the anecdote, the "Robinet", place name of the Donzère gorge where the Rhône shrinks because of the cliffs, derives its name of a former landowner: Robin Berton nicknamed Robinet.

It is usually admitted by geographers and climatologists that the Donzère gorge, along about 3 km (1.9 mi), signals the northern boundary of the Mediterranean climate in the Rhône valley. So, Donzère marked during a long time the northern boundary of the olive groves, but in recent years and consequence of the global warming, this limit seems slightly back northward next to the Cruas gorge, on the north of Montélimar.

Somewhat protected from mistral thanks to its hills located in the north, the village opens on the plain of Tricastin where were born the Mediterranean ambiance and cultivations.

The privileged location of Donzère in the Rhône valley (high place of passage) surely explains its recent economic and demographic dynamism.

== Population ==
Historical population

Year	Pop.	±% p.a.
1911	1,561	—
1962	2,311	+0.77%
1968	3,334	+6.30%
1975	3,223	−0.48%
1982	3,915	+2.82%
1990	4,265	+1.08%

Year	Pop.	±% p.a.
1999	4,379	+0.29%
2007	4,932	+1.50%
2012	5,437	+1.97%
2017	5,833	+1.42%
2023	6,008	+0.49%

Source: EHESS and INSEE (1968-2023)

== Sights ==
- The caves of the Donzère gorge
- The Molard villa, which includes the largest known wine cellar of the Roman world with a capacity of 2.500 hl
- The Saint-Philibert church (12th century) built by the Cluniacs
- The preserved battlements, with the fortified gates of Argentière and the font (12th century)
- The Renaissance castle of Claude de Tournon (16th century), bishop of Viviers and prince of Donzère
- The manor house Bouvier de Robinet (18th century)
- Old houses (from the 15th to the 18th century)
- The clock tower
- The Chapel Notre-Dame-de-Combelonge (from the 15th to the 17th century)
- The round table
- The former chocolate factory of Aiguebelle, with murals of the New Testament by Loys Prat
- The suspension bridge nicknamed "bridge of Robinet", built in 1847 according to the technique of Seguin
- The Virgin vow statue built after World War II

== Personalities ==
- Encyclopédiste Antoine Penchenier, died in Donzère in 1761
- Félix Clement, painter of the 19th century, Prix de Rome
- Loys Prat, painter of the 19th-20th centuries, Prix de Rome, Félix Clement's nephew
- Maurice-René Simonnet, politician of the 20th century, French minister, deputy and councillor of the Drôme, member of the Constitutional council, dean of the law faculty of the Lyon III University

== See also ==
- Communes of the Drôme department

== Bibliography ==
- Félix Cardinale, Mémoire de maîtrise sur l'administration de Donzère au XVIII^{e} siècle, University of Aix-en-Provence.
