= Roussas =

- Commune
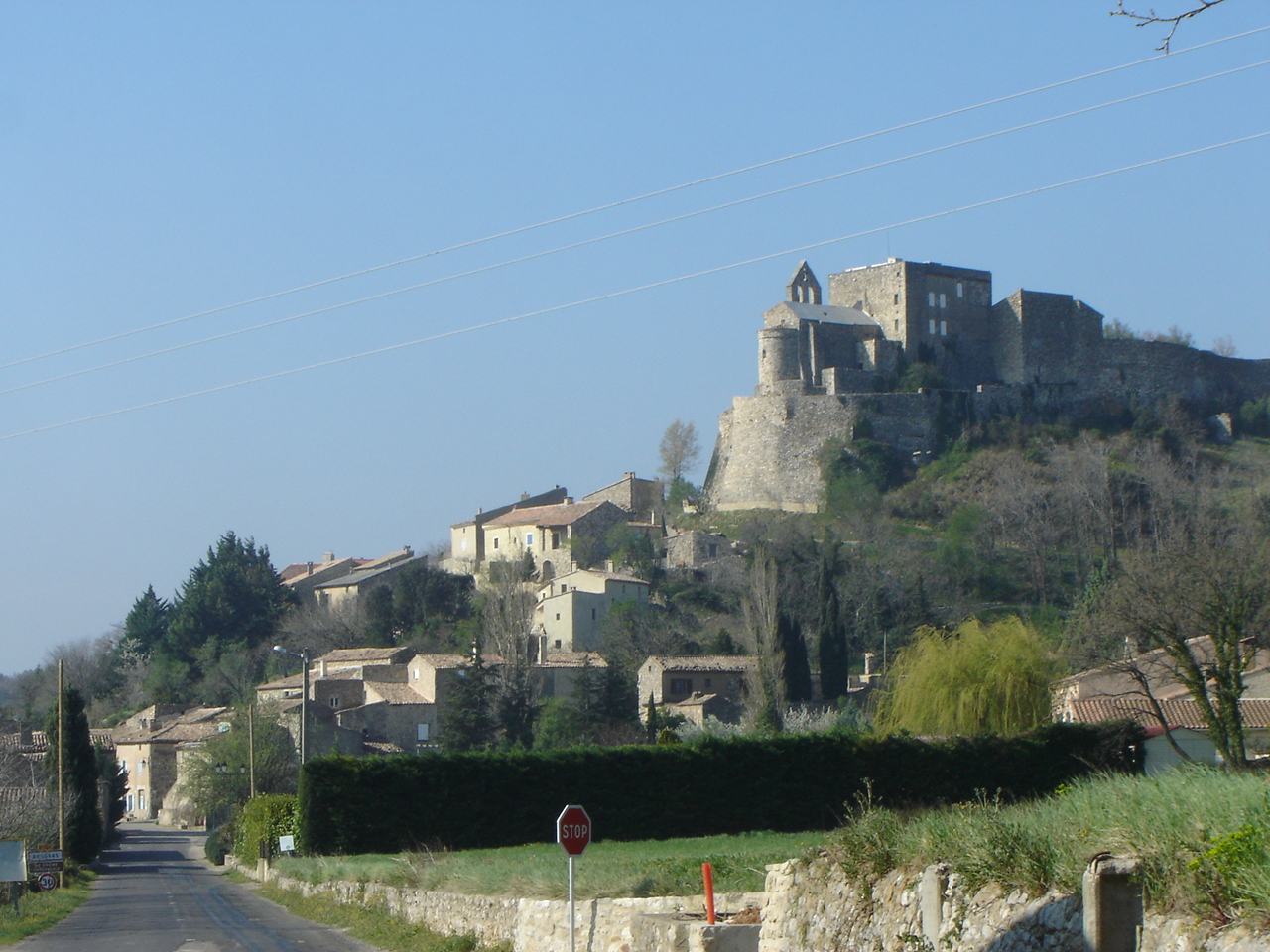
- The village of Roussas and its château
- Location of Roussas
- Location within France Location within Auvergne-Rhône-Alpes
- Coordinates: 44°25′54″N 4°48′09″E
- Country: France
- Region: Auvergne-Rhône-Alpes
- Department: Drôme
- Arrondissement: Nyons
- Canton: Grignan

Government
  - Mayor (2020–2026): Christiane Robert
- Area^{1}: 16.07 km^{2} (6.20 sq mi)
- Elevation: 182 m (597 ft)
- Highest elevation: 390 m (1,280 ft)
- Lowest elevation: 83 m (272 ft)
- Population (2023): 409
  - Density: 25.5/km^{2} (65.9/sq mi)
- Time zone: UTC+01:00 (CET)
  - Summer (DST): UTC+02:00 (CEST)
- INSEE/Postal code: 26284 /26230
- ^{1} French Land Register data, which excludes lakes, ponds, glaciers > 1 km^{2} (0.386 sq mi or 247 acres) and river estuaries.

Roussas is a commune in the Drôme department in southeastern France.

== Population ==
Historical population
Year	Pop.	±% p.a.
1968	157	—
1975	182	+2.13%
1982	246	+4.40%
1990	315	+3.14%
1999	345	+1.02%
2007	336	−0.33%
2012	360	+1.39%
2017	365	+0.28%
2023	409	+1.92%
Source: INSEE

== See also ==
- Communes of the Drôme department
