= Malataverne =

- Commune
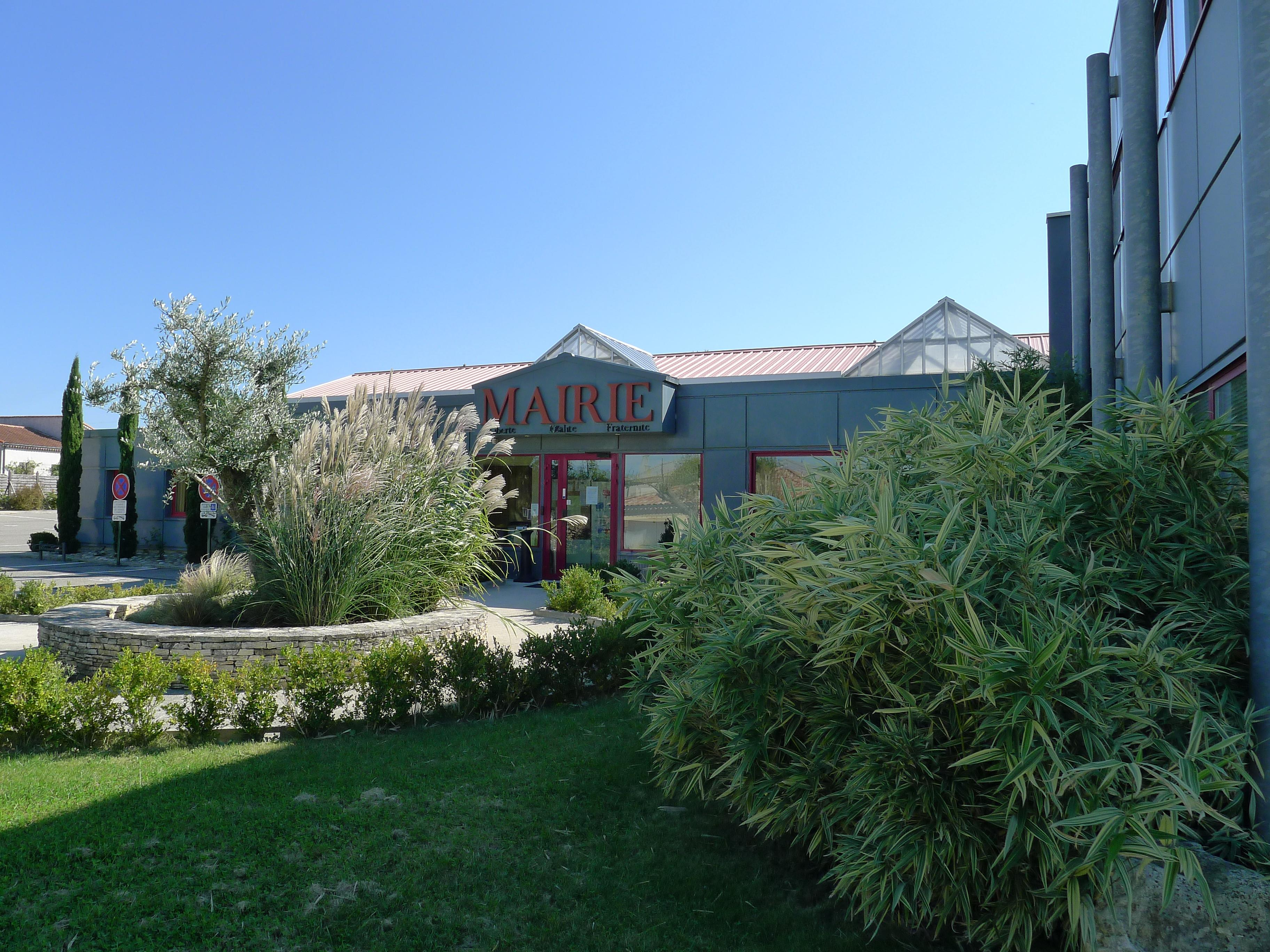
- Town hall

- Coat of arms
- Location of Malataverne
- Location within France Location within Auvergne-Rhône-Alpes
- Coordinates: 44°29′19″N 4°45′06″E
- Country: France
- Region: Auvergne-Rhône-Alpes
- Department: Drôme
- Arrondissement: Nyons
- Canton: Grignan

Government
  - Mayor (2020–2026): Véronique Alliez
- Area^{1}: 16.68 km^{2} (6.44 sq mi)
- Elevation: 70 m (230 ft)
- Highest elevation: 390 m (1,280 ft)
- Lowest elevation: 78 m (256 ft)
- Population (2023): 2,258
  - Density: 135.4/km^{2} (350.6/sq mi)
- Time zone: UTC+01:00 (CET)
  - Summer (DST): UTC+02:00 (CEST)
- INSEE/Postal code: 26169 /26780
- ^{1} French Land Register data, which excludes lakes, ponds, glaciers > 1 km^{2} (0.386 sq mi or 247 acres) and river estuaries.

Malataverne (French pronunciation: [malatavɛʁn]; Occitan: Malatavèrna) is a commune in the Drôme department in southeastern France.

== Population ==
Historical population

Year	Pop.	±% p.a.
1793	404	—
1806	437	+0.61%
1831	556	+0.97%
1851	671	+0.94%
1876	596	−0.47%
1881	572	−0.82%
1886	547	−0.89%
1891	513	−1.28%
1896	527	+0.54%
1901	472	−2.18%
1906	433	−1.71%
1911	444	+0.50%
1921	394	−1.19%
1926	394	+0.00%

Year	Pop.	±% p.a.
1931	433	+1.91%
1936	408	−1.18%
1946	390	−0.45%
1954	472	+2.41%
1962	436	−0.99%
1968	480	+1.62%
1975	785	+7.28%
1982	985	+3.30%
1990	1,289	+3.42%
1999	1,419	+1.07%
2007	1,624	+1.70%
2012	1,891	+3.09%
2017	2,012	+1.25%
2023	2,258	+1.94%

Source: EHESS and INSEE (1968-2023)

== See also ==
- Nicolas Appert
- Communes of the Drôme department
