= Canton of Saint-Paul-Trois-Châteaux =

Coordinates: 44°19′20″N 4°50′23″E

Saint-Paul-Trois-Châteaux
- Former canton
- Interactive map of Saint-Paul-Trois-Châteaux
- Country: France
- Region: Auvergne-Rhône-Alpes
- Department: Drôme
- No. of communes: {{{nbcomm}}}
- Disbanded: 2015
- Population (2012): 19,749

The Canton of Saint-Paul-Trois-Châteaux is a former canton located in the Department of Drôme, in the Arrondissement of Nyons. Its seat (chef-lieu) was the town Saint-Paul-Trois-Châteaux. The canton had 19,749 inhabitants in 2012. It was disbanded following the French canton reorganisation which came into effect in March 2015. It included the following communes:

- Bouchet
- Clansayes
- La Baume-de-Transit
- Montségur-sur-Lauzon
- Rochegude
- Saint-Paul-Trois-Châteaux
- Saint-Restitut
- Solérieux
- Suze-la-Rousse
- Tulette

== See also ==
- Cantons of the Drôme department
