= Suze-la-Rousse =

- Commune
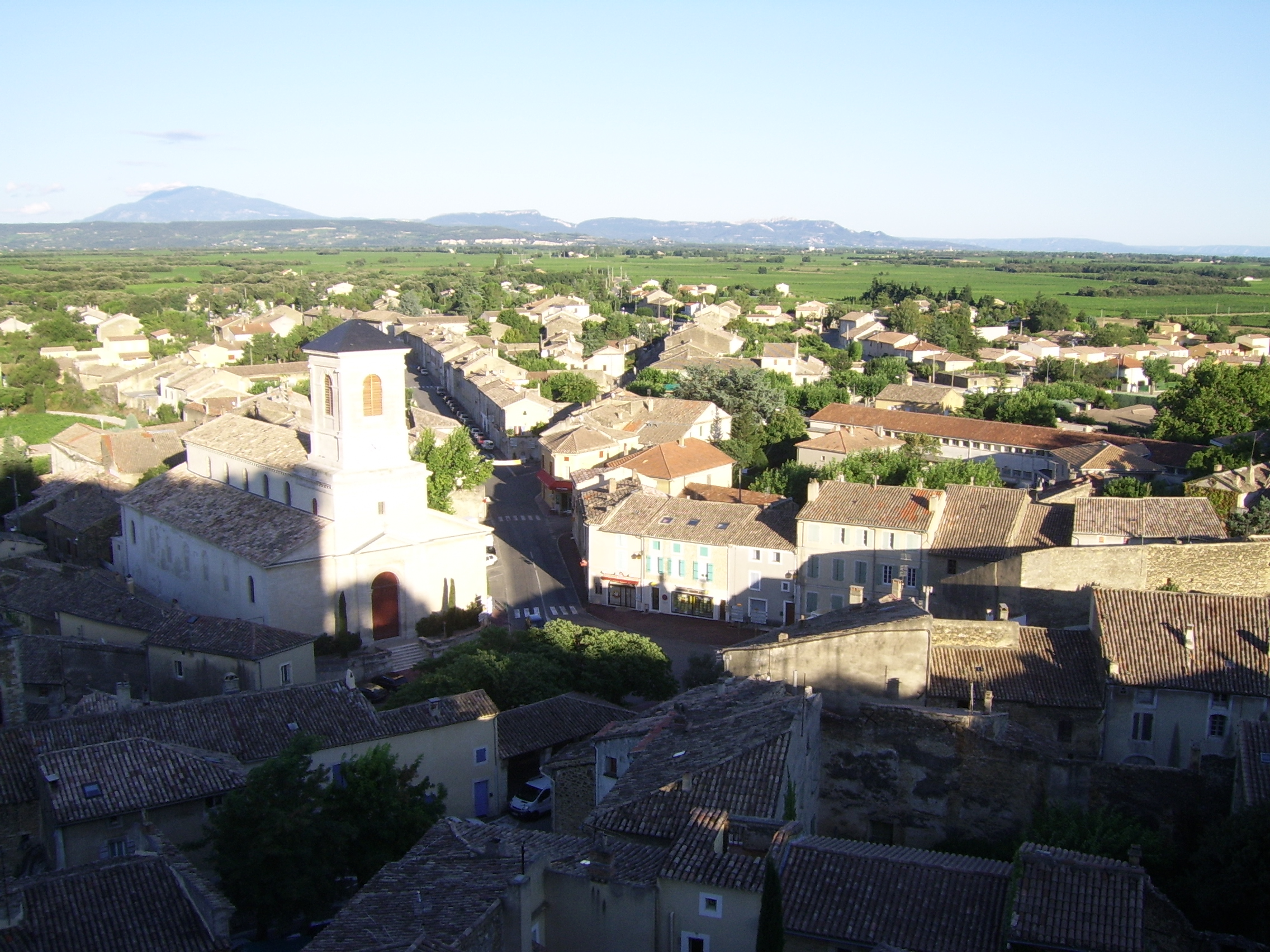
- Suze-la-Rousse and Mont Ventoux seen from the castle

- Coat of arms
- Location of Suze-la-Rousse
- Location within France Location within Auvergne-Rhône-Alpes
- Coordinates: 44°17′19″N 4°50′35″E
- Country: France
- Region: Auvergne-Rhône-Alpes
- Department: Drôme
- Arrondissement: Nyons
- Canton: Le Tricastin

Government
  - Mayor (2020–2026): Hervé Medina
- Area^{1}: 30.6 km^{2} (11.8 sq mi)
- Highest elevation: 141 m (463 ft)
- Lowest elevation: 65 m (213 ft)
- Population (2023): 2,077
  - Density: 67.9/km^{2} (176/sq mi)
- Time zone: UTC+01:00 (CET)
  - Summer (DST): UTC+02:00 (CEST)
- INSEE/Postal code: 26345 /26790
- ^{1} French Land Register data, which excludes lakes, ponds, glaciers > 1 km^{2} (0.386 sq mi or 247 acres) and river estuaries.

Suze-la-Rousse (French pronunciation: [syz la ʁus]; Occitan: Susa la Rossa) is a commune in the Drôme department in southeastern France, situated in the heart of the Rhône Valley vineyards

== Location ==
Suze-la-Rousse is located 10 km (6.2 mi) southeast of Saint-Paul-Trois-Châteaux and 18 km (11 mi) north of Orange. It extends over the left bank of the river Lez and commands an uninterrupted view of the Mont Ventoux, the Lance mountains, and the foothills of the Dauphiné Alps. The neighbouring settlements are Bollène, Rochegude, Tulette, Sainte-Cécile-les-Vignes, Bouchet, La Baume-de-Transit, Solérieux et Saint-Restitut.

== History ==
In the Middle Ages, Suze-la-Rousse was the most important town of Tricastin. Suze castle was built in the 12th century by the princes of Orange on the site of a hunting lodge given by Charlemagne to his cousin Guillaume de Gellone. With its fortified medieval walls, this fortress dominated the surrounding area and guaranteed it occupants perfect security. During the Renaissance, the princes of Orange made it their country retreat.

== Population ==
Historical population
Year	Pop.	±% p.a.
1968	1,209	—
1975	1,197	−0.14%
1982	1,396	+2.22%
1990	1,422	+0.23%
1999	1,564	+1.06%
2007	1,838	+2.04%
2012	1,963	+1.32%
2017	2,104	+1.40%
2023	2,077	−0.22%
Source: INSEE

== Wine ==
At the foot of the castle is the location of the University of Wine, a department of the University Institute of Valence. The facility, with its laboratories and tasting rooms is unique in Europe, and offers courses in oenology, marketing, and management for the wine industry.

== International relations ==
Suze-la-Rousse was twinned with the town of Gouvy in Belgium in 2003.

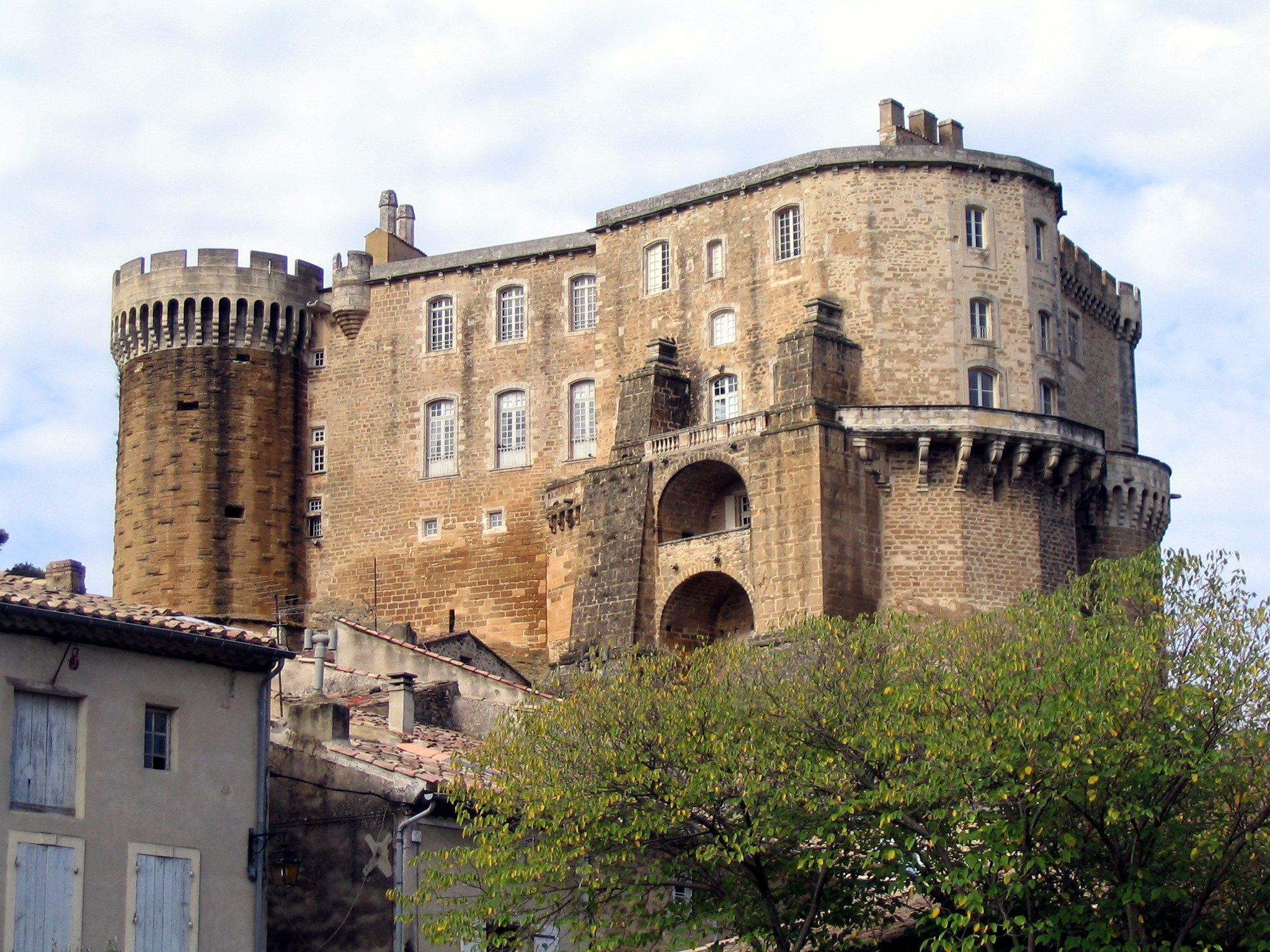
The castle

== See also ==
- Communes of the Drôme department
