= 2012 Paris–Nice =

2012 UCI World Tour, race 2 of 28
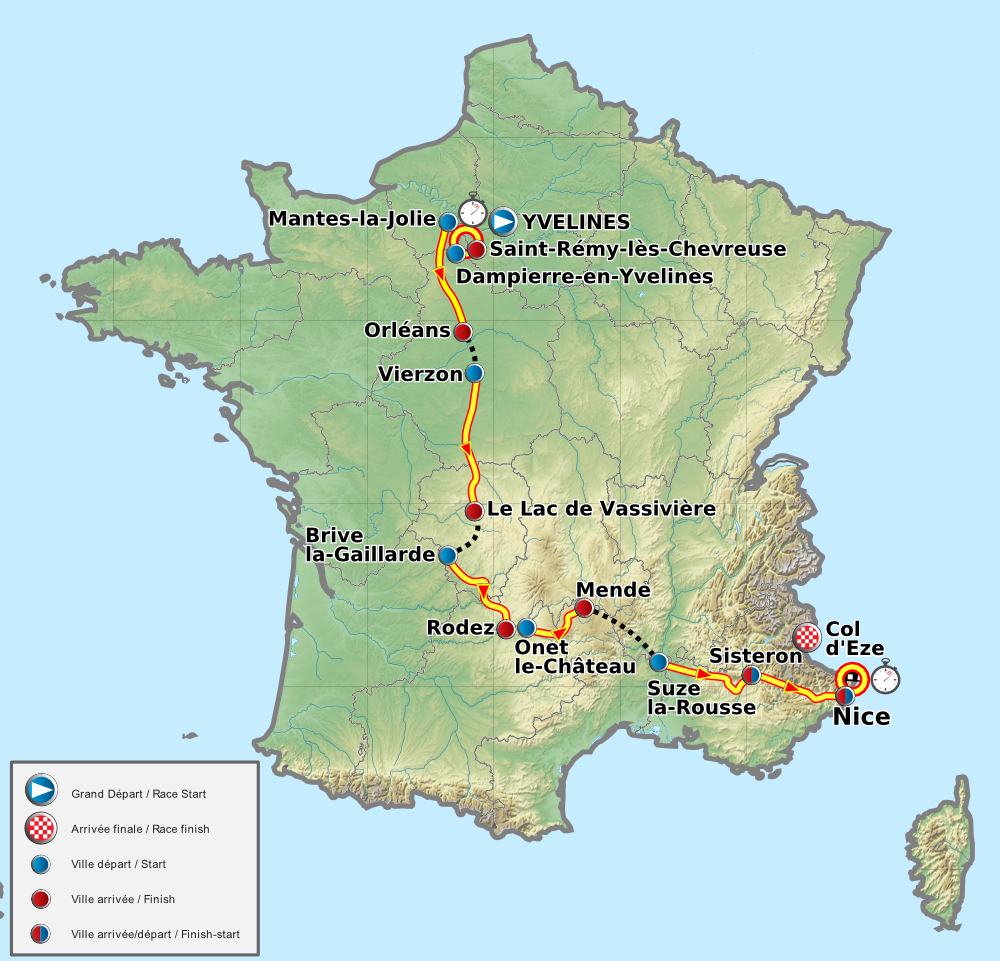
- The route of the 2012 Paris–Nice

Race details
- Dates: 4–11 March 2012
- Stages: 8
- Distance: 1,155.5 km (718.0 mi)
- Winning time: 28h 12' 16"

Results
| Jersey awarded to the overall winner | Winner | Bradley Wiggins (GBR) | (Team Sky) |
| | Second | Lieuwe Westra (NED) | (Vacansoleil–DCM) |
| | Third | Alejandro Valverde (ESP) | (Movistar Team) |
| Jersey awarded to the points classification winner | Points | Bradley Wiggins (GBR) | (Team Sky) |
| Jersey awarded to the mountains classification winner | Mountains | Frederik Veuchelen (BEL) | (Vacansoleil–DCM) |
| Jersey awarded to the young rider classification winner | Young rider | Tejay van Garderen (USA) | (BMC Racing Team) |
| | Team | Vacansoleil–DCM | |

The 2012 Paris–Nice was the 70th running of the Paris–Nice cycling stage race, often known as the Race to the Sun. It started on 4 March in Dampierre-en-Yvelines and ended on 11 March in Nice and consisted of eight stages, including two time trials that bookended the race. It was the second race of the 2012 UCI World Tour season.

The race was won by Great Britain's Bradley Wiggins of Team Sky, who took the lead on the second stage of the race and held the race leader's yellow jersey to the finish, becoming the first British rider to win the race since Tom Simpson in 1967. Wiggins also took home the green jersey for amassing the highest number of points during stages at intermediate sprints and stage finishes. Wiggins won the general classification by eight seconds over runner-up Lieuwe Westra (Vacansoleil–DCM), who was winner of the race's queen stage to Mende. Movistar Team's Alejandro Valverde completed the podium, 62 seconds behind Westra and 70 seconds down on Wiggins.

In the race's other classifications, Tejay van Garderen of BMC Racing Team won the white jersey for the highest placed rider born in 1987 or later by placing fifth overall in the general classification, while Vacansoleil–DCM rider Frederik Veuchelen won the King of the Mountains classification. Vacansoleil–DCM also finished at the head of the teams classification at the end of a fruitful week for the team, in which their riders also claimed three stage victories.

== Teams ==
As Paris–Nice was a UCI World Tour event, all 18 UCI ProTeams were invited automatically and obligated to send a squad. Four other squads were given wildcard places into the race, and as such, formed the event's 22-team peloton.

The 22 teams that competed in the race were:

- Ag2r–La Mondiale
- Astana
- BMC Racing Team
- Cofidis
- Team Europcar
- Euskaltel–Euskadi
- FDJ–BigMat
- Garmin–Barracuda
- GreenEDGE
- Team Katusha
- Lampre–ISD
- Liquigas–Cannondale
- Lotto–Belisol
- Movistar Team
- Omega Pharma–Quick-Step
- Project 1t4i
- Rabobank
- RadioShack–Nissan
- Saur–Sojasun
- Team Saxo Bank
- Team Sky
- Vacansoleil–DCM

== Route ==
Stage characteristics and winners
| Stage | Date | Course | Distance | Type | Winner |
|---|---|---|---|---|---|
| 1 | 4 March | Dampierre-en-Yvelines to Saint-Rémy-lès-Chevreuse | 9.4 km (5.8 mi) | Individual time trial | Gustav Larsson (SWE) |
| 2 | 5 March | Mantes-la-Jolie to Orléans | 185.5 km (115.3 mi) | Flat stage | Tom Boonen (BEL) |
| 3 | 6 March | Vierzon to Lac de Vassivière | 194 km (121 mi) | Hilly stage | Alejandro Valverde (ESP) |
| 4 | 7 March | Brive-la-Gaillarde to Rodez | 178 km (111 mi) | Hilly stage | Gianni Meersman (BEL) |
| 5 | 8 March | Onet-le-Château to Mende | 178.5 km (110.9 mi) | Medium mountain stage | Lieuwe Westra (NED) |
| 6 | 9 March | Suze-la-Rousse to Sisteron | 178.5 km (110.9 mi) | Hilly stage | Luis León Sánchez (ESP) |
| 7 | 10 March | Sisteron to Nice | 219.5 km (136.4 mi) | Medium mountain stage | Thomas De Gendt (BEL) |
| 8 | 11 March | Nice to Col d'Èze | 9.6 km (6.0 mi) | Individual time trial | Bradley Wiggins (GBR) |

== Stages ==
=== Stage 1 ===
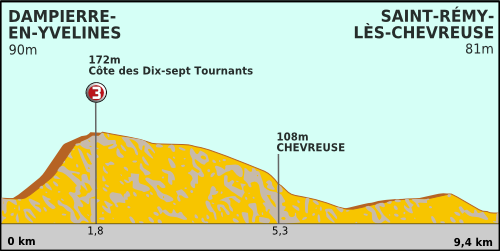
Stage profile

4 March 2012 — Dampierre-en-Yvelines to Saint-Rémy-lès-Chevreuse, 9.4 km (5.8 mi) (ITT)

The race began in the Vallée de Chevreuse for the first time, as it reverted to an opening individual time trial stage after race organisers elected to run a road stage first in 2011. Apart from the third-category climb of the Côte des Dix-sept Tournants – the hill of seventeen turns – the stage was relatively flat, dropping only 9 metres (30 ft) in altitude from the start, to the end. With rain expected to disrupt the stage, teams decided to spread their time trial specialists across the field in order to maximise their potential of winning the stage. For the first rider to depart the start in Dampierre-en-Yvelines, Project 1t4i's Alexandre Geniez, weather conditions were cloudy and grey, with slightly damp roads due to overnight rains. He ultimately recorded a time of 12' 10" for the stage.

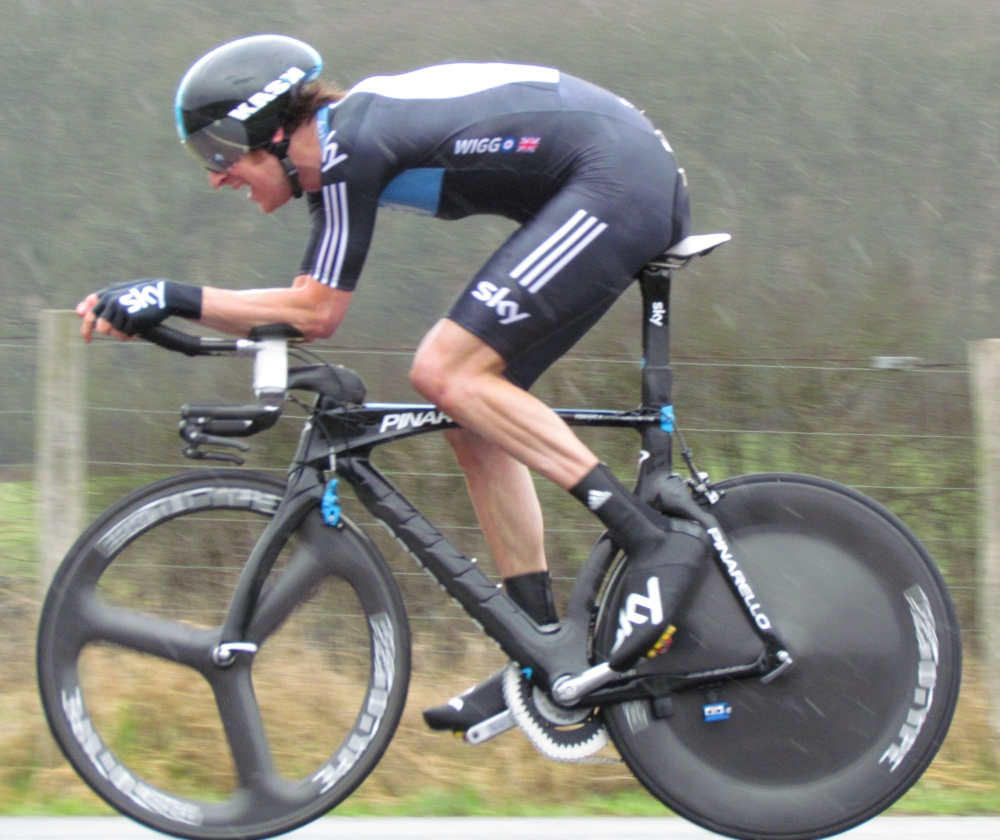
Bradley Wiggins finished second to Gustav Larsson by one second on the stage, despite encountering wet conditions.

Geniez held the lead for all of a few minutes as Denis Menchov (Team Katusha) improved upon his time by eight seconds, before Garmin–Barracuda rider Thomas Dekker was the first rider to set a time below twelve minutes, recording a time of 11' 56"; a six-second improvement on Menchov's time. Michael Mørkøv (Team Saxo Bank), and later Maarten Wynants (Rabobank) both improved upon Dekker's time, but by the end of the first wave of riders to depart, it was Omega Pharma–Quick-Step and Sylvain Chavanel that held the lead, recording a time of 11' 31". Following a quick start to the stage, Vacansoleil–DCM's Thomas De Gendt was the next rider to hold the provisional best time on the stage, besting Chavanel's time by less than a second. De Gendt, who won the opening stage of the race in 2011, ultimately picked up the polka-dot jersey for the lead in the mountains classification, as he held the quickest time to the intermediate timing point, at the summit of the Côte des Dix-sept Tournants. De Gendt's time held for a while, as riders struggled to match the pace that he had set, with only Markel Irizar of RadioShack–Nissan coming within touching distance of his time, finishing one second down.

It was not until De Gendt's Vacansoleil–DCM team-mate Gustav Larsson – the Swedish national champion in the discipline – that his time was beaten; Larsson, although six seconds slower than De Gendt to the intermediate checkpoint, put in a better second element to the race, eventually crossing the finish line in an eventual stage-winning time of 11' 19". Omega Pharma–Quick-Step also deployed Levi Leipheimer in the first half of riders to complete the course, and did so in a time four seconds slower than Larsson. The weather closed in for the last batch of riders, providing a tougher test for those riders in wanting to position themselves highly in the stage classification. BMC Racing Team's Tejay van Garderen and Team Sky's Bradley Wiggins both attacked the course late on, and were rewarded with finishes inside the top five, as van Garderen finished nine seconds down on Larsson, while Wiggins – a winner of the time trial stage in February's Volta ao Algarve – fell short by just one second, but ensured he had an advantage of 24 seconds on defending race-winner and world time trial champion Tony Martin (Omega Pharma–Quick-Step), who could only finish 28th.

Stage 1 Result and General Classification after Stage 1

| | Rider | Team | Time |
|---|---|---|---|
| 1 | Gustav Larsson (SWE) | Vacansoleil–DCM | 11' 19" |
| 2 | Bradley Wiggins (GBR) | Team Sky | + 1" |
| 3 | Levi Leipheimer (USA) | Omega Pharma–Quick-Step | + 4" |
| 4 | Tejay van Garderen (USA) | BMC Racing Team | + 9" |
| 5 | Thomas De Gendt (BEL) | Vacansoleil–DCM | + 12" |
| 6 | Sylvain Chavanel (FRA) | Omega Pharma–Quick-Step | + 12" |
| 7 | Rein Taaramäe (EST) | Cofidis | + 13" |
| 8 | Markel Irizar (ESP) | RadioShack–Nissan | + 13" |
| 9 | Rémi Pauriol (FRA) | FDJ–BigMat | + 15" |
| 10 | Jérôme Coppel (FRA) | Saur–Sojasun | + 15" |

=== Stage 2 ===
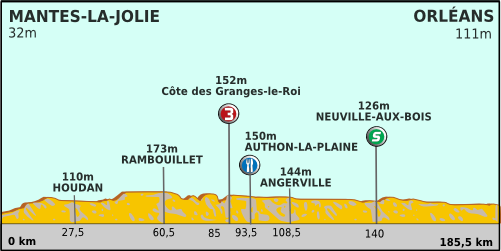
Stage profile

5 March 2012 — Mantes-la-Jolie to Orléans, 185.5 km (115.3 mi)

Following his crash in the opening day time trial, Team Saxo Bank's Nick Nuyens became the race's first abandonment; he attempted to ride through the pain barrier, but had to withdraw within the neutralised zone prior to the real start of the stage. The peloton itself remained together for the first third of the race, as strong headwinds counteracted against the field and did not allow for any breakaways to be formed efficiently. As such, Olivier Kaisen was the first to make a move for Lotto–Belisol, attacking as the field moved through the commune of Rambouillet. Kaisen managed to extend his advantage out by almost three minutes when he reached the summit of the day's only categorised climb, in Les Granges-le-Roi. Mountains classification leader Thomas De Gendt (Vacansoleil–DCM) placed second, with Sylvain Chavanel third for Omega Pharma–Quick-Step.

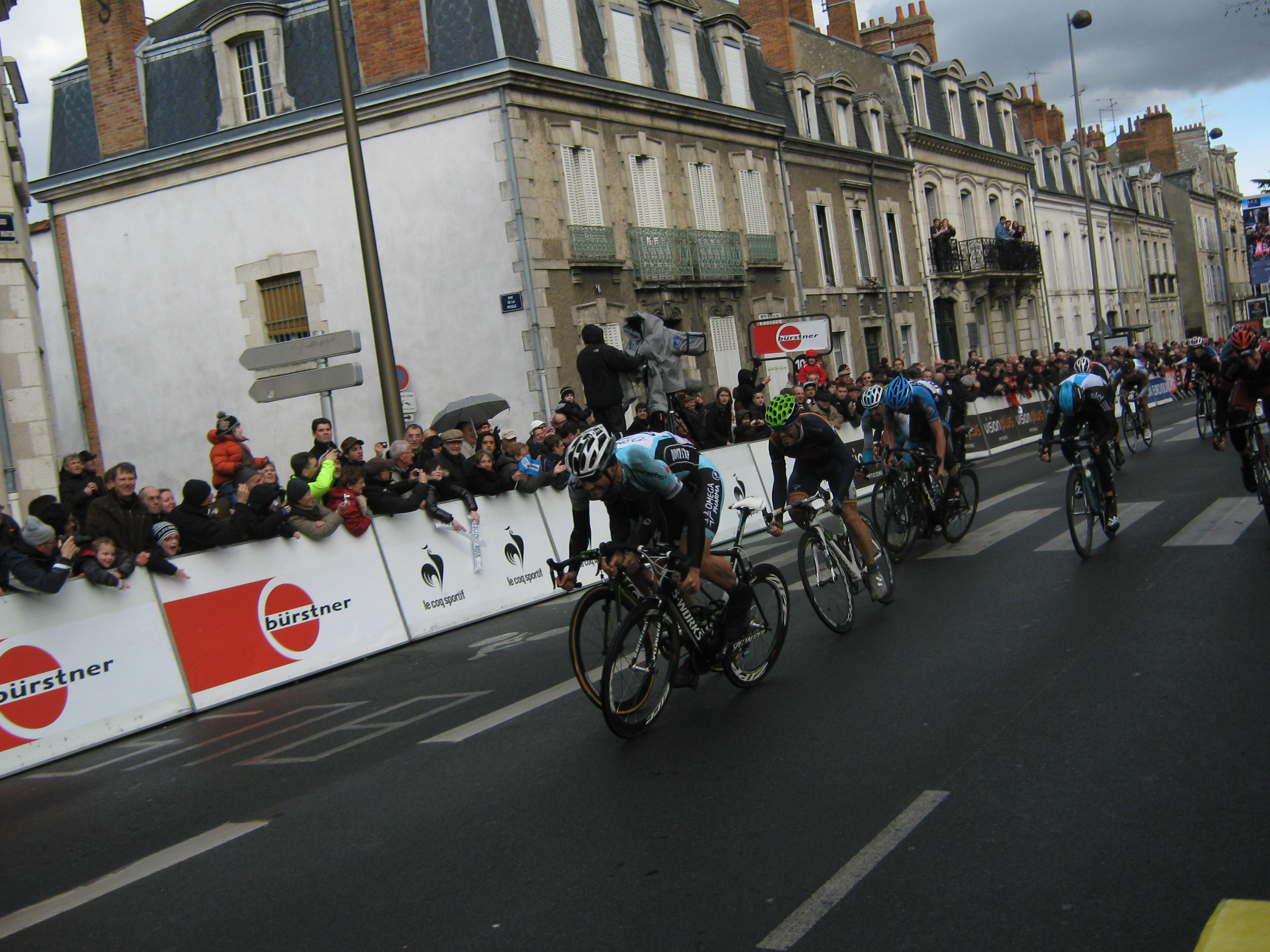
The closing sprint: Tom Boonen (Omega Pharma–Quick-Step) leads John Degenkolb (hidden behind Boonen, Project 1t4i) and José Joaquín Rojas (Movistar Team) in Orléans.

As the field reached the midway point of the stage, the windy conditions that had earlier plagued any potential breakaway from forming returned, and the crosswinds provided a large split in the field and echelons forming within it. By the time that the race had been finished, around thirty riders had made it in the lead group on the road, including overall contenders Bradley Wiggins of Team Sky, Omega Pharma–Quick-Step's Levi Leipheimer and BMC Racing Team rider Tejay van Garderen. The group was later reduced to 21 riders out front after several small crashes eliminated a handful of riders from contention. Wiggins put more time into his rivals by taking the intermediate sprint, and with it, three bonus seconds on offer that gave him the virtual race lead, without even considering the fact that the overnight leader Gustav Larsson (Vacansoleil–DCM) failed to make the split. The gap from the lead pack to the first group of pursuers remained between two and two-and-a-half minutes for the rest of stage with many teams electing not to bridge the gap, mainly due to the rain that had commenced within the closing 25 km (15.5 mi).

Larsson's team-mate Lieuwe Westra attacked with around 4 km (2.5 mi) remaining, but his effort was quickly neutralised by Chavanel, one of a number of Omega Pharma–Quick-Step riders in the group hoping to help Tom Boonen in a sprint finish lead-out. Following another failed attack from Garmin–Barracuda rider Andreas Klier, it was left to the sprinters to battle it out for the stage honours. Project 1t4i's John Degenkolb – who had recovered to the group after a puncture with 30 km (18.6 mi) remaining – was the first to make an attempt for the line, closely followed by José Joaquín Rojas (Movistar Team), but both were out-sprinted by Boonen, who went to the inside of Degenkolb and took out the victory, for the 100th individual victory of his career, and his team's first at UCI World Tour level. Rojas just beat Degenkolb for second place on the line with Sep Vanmarcke and Francesco Gavazzi rounding out the top five for Garmin–Barracuda and Astana respectively. Following his finish in the lead group, Wiggins assumed the overall lead from Larsson, with Boonen taking the points classification lead while moving into third place overall behind team-mate Leipheimer, thanks to the bonus seconds on offer at the finish.

Stage 2 result

| | Rider | Team | Time |
|---|---|---|---|
| 1 | Tom Boonen (BEL) | Omega Pharma–Quick-Step | 4h 22' 15" |
| 2 | José Joaquín Rojas (ESP) | Movistar Team | s.t. |
| 3 | John Degenkolb (GER) | Project 1t4i | s.t. |
| 4 | Sep Vanmarcke (BEL) | Garmin–Barracuda | s.t. |
| 5 | Francesco Gavazzi (ITA) | Astana | s.t. |
| 6 | Ángel Vicioso (ESP) | Team Katusha | s.t. |
| 7 | Maxime Monfort (BEL) | RadioShack–Nissan | s.t. |
| 8 | Taylor Phinney (USA) | BMC Racing Team | s.t. |
| 9 | Alejandro Valverde (ESP) | Movistar Team | s.t. |
| 10 | Geraint Thomas (GBR) | Team Sky | s.t. |

General Classification after Stage 2

| | Rider | Team | Time |
|---|---|---|---|
| 1 | Bradley Wiggins (GBR) | Team Sky | 4h 33' 32" |
| 2 | Levi Leipheimer (USA) | Omega Pharma–Quick-Step | + 6" |
| 3 | Tom Boonen (BEL) | Omega Pharma–Quick-Step | + 7" |
| 4 | Tejay van Garderen (USA) | BMC Racing Team | + 11" |
| 5 | Sylvain Chavanel (FRA) | Omega Pharma–Quick-Step | + 14" |
| 6 | Maxime Monfort (BEL) | RadioShack–Nissan | + 18" |
| 7 | Taylor Phinney (USA) | BMC Racing Team | + 21" |
| 8 | Lieuwe Westra (NED) | Vacansoleil–DCM | + 22" |
| 9 | Geraint Thomas (GBR) | Team Sky | + 28" |
| 10 | José Joaquín Rojas (ESP) | Movistar Team | + 29" |

=== Stage 3 ===
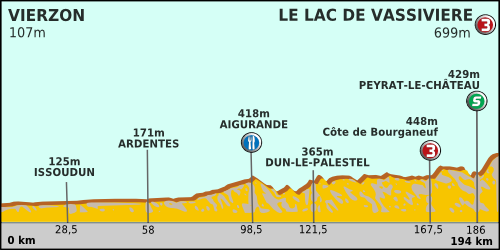
Stage profile

6 March 2012 — Vierzon to Lac de Vassivière, 194 km (120.5 mi)

A trio of riders – Project 1t4i's Roy Curvers, Saur–Sojasun rider Jimmy Engoulvent and Michael Mørkøv of Team Saxo Bank – made the early breakaway from the field, and managed to extend their advantage to the main field to over four-and-a-half minutes at one point during the stage, before eventually stabilising at the 4' 30" mark for the majority of the stage. Team Sky and Omega Pharma–Quick-Step riders occupied the front portion of the peloton, protecting their respective lead riders Bradley Wiggins and Levi Leipheimer in order to not lose time before the final climb at Lac de Vassivière. The pack, now fronted by the Movistar Team, steadily cut into the lead for the three escapees, who reached the categorised climb of the Côte de Bourganeuf with an advantage of less than three minutes. Curvers crested the summit first, but posed no threat to the mountains classification leader Thomas De Gendt (Vacansoleil–DCM), who kept a hold of the polka-dot jersey.

After the climb, the peloton lifted the pace and cut into the leaders' advantage, trimming off two minutes within the space of 10 km (6.2 mi). Engoulvent left his two breakaway companions behind with 14 km (8.7 mi) remaining, as Omega Pharma–Quick-Step hit the front of the peloton, this time with points classification leader Tom Boonen doing some of the legwork. Engoulvent held his slim lead through the intermediate sprint at Peyrat-le-Château, before being engulfed by the field with 6 km (3.7 mi) to go. Vacansoleil–DCM rider Sergey Lagutin attacked with 4 km (2.5 mi) to go – just as team-mate Lieuwe Westra did the previous day – but was unsuccessful, and was eventually caught just before the final kilometre of the stage. Westra attacked but was covered off immediately, setting up the uphill sprint to the line.

French pair Blel Kadri (Ag2r–La Mondiale) and Jérémie Galland (Saur–Sojasun) both launched their attacks in the closing stages, but were overhauled by a bunch of riders from which Alejandro Valverde (Movistar Team) looked to have the legs on the rest of the field, sprinting from 300 m (980 ft) out. Valverde was briefly troubled by the sprint of Australian road race champion Simon Gerrans (GreenEDGE), with Valverde ultimately prevailing at the line – just as was the case at the Tour Down Under in a two-up sprint – by half a wheel length, with Lotto–Belisol's Gianni Meersman rounding out the podium ahead of Rabobank's Luis León Sánchez and Team Katusha's Xavier Florencio; both of whom had launched their own attacks in the closing metres. Valverde's victory – his fourth of the season since returning from a doping ban – was enough to move him into the lead of the points classification, while the bonus seconds awarded on the line moved him into sixth place overall, 20 seconds down on race leader Wiggins.

Stage 3 result

| | Rider | Team | Time |
|---|---|---|---|
| 1 | Alejandro Valverde (ESP) | Movistar Team | 4h 36' 19" |
| 2 | Simon Gerrans (AUS) | GreenEDGE | s.t. |
| 3 | Gianni Meersman (BEL) | Lotto–Belisol | s.t. |
| 4 | Luis León Sánchez (ESP) | Rabobank | s.t. |
| 5 | Xavier Florencio (ESP) | Team Katusha | s.t. |
| 6 | Eros Capecchi (ITA) | Liquigas–Cannondale | s.t. |
| 7 | Maxime Monfort (BEL) | RadioShack–Nissan | s.t. |
| 8 | Jonathan Hivert (FRA) | Saur–Sojasun | s.t. |
| 9 | Francesco Gavazzi (ITA) | Astana | s.t. |
| 10 | Lieuwe Westra (NED) | Vacansoleil–DCM | s.t. |

General Classification after Stage 3

| | Rider | Team | Time |
|---|---|---|---|
| 1 | Bradley Wiggins (GBR) | Team Sky | 9h 09' 51" |
| 2 | Levi Leipheimer (USA) | Omega Pharma–Quick-Step | + 6" |
| 3 | Tejay van Garderen (USA) | BMC Racing Team | + 11" |
| 4 | Sylvain Chavanel (FRA) | Omega Pharma–Quick-Step | + 14" |
| 5 | Maxime Monfort (BEL) | RadioShack–Nissan | + 18" |
| 6 | Alejandro Valverde (ESP) | Movistar Team | + 20" |
| 7 | Lieuwe Westra (NED) | Vacansoleil–DCM | + 22" |
| 8 | José Joaquín Rojas (ESP) | Movistar Team | + 29" |
| 9 | Simon Špilak (SLO) | Team Katusha | + 33" |
| 10 | Robert Kišerlovski (CRO) | Astana | + 36" |

=== Stage 4 ===
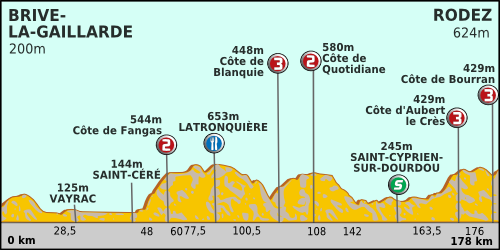
Stage profile

7 March 2012 — Brive-la-Gaillarde to Rodez, 178 km (110.6 mi)

A quintet of riders – Ag2r–La Mondiale's Jean-Christophe Péraud, FDJ–BigMat rider Pierrick Fédrigo, Leigh Howard of GreenEDGE, Lotto–Belisol's Bart De Clercq and Cofidis rider Luis Ángel Maté – made the early breakaway from the field, and managed to extend their advantage over the main field to in excess of five minutes at one point during the stage. As such, the riders between them managed to take all sub-classification points on offer during the stage, at the single intermediate sprint – coming after 142 km (88.2 mi) at Saint-Cyprien-sur-Dourdou – and the first three of the five categorised climbs during the stage. Their advantage out front dwindled quickly as the peloton – led by Rabobank and Lampre–ISD – gathered pace, leaving the breakaway with just 90 seconds of a lead out front with around 40 km (24.9 mi) to go. 15 km (9.3 mi) later, Maté sat up with cramping in his knee – stemming from a crash in Stage 2 – having already wrested the lead of the mountains classification away from Thomas De Gendt (Vacansoleil–DCM). The peloton picked up the pace again, with Omega Pharma–Quick-Step on the front, and the remaining members of the breakaway were caught a short time later.

De Gendt himself attacked on the penultimate climb, the Côte d'Aubert le Crès, to limit the points gap between himself and Maté, picking up the four points on offer for reaching the summit first and reducing his gap to Maté to eight points. After a short period off the front of the field, De Gendt was caught by a small gruppetto of riders and ultimately the rest of the field moments later, with the Movistar Team and Team Sky squads making moves in order to get their respective classification leaders Alejandro Valverde and Bradley Wiggins in safe positions for the run to Rodez. Andreas Klöden tried to go clear inside the final 2 km (1.2 mi) for RadioShack–Nissan, taking top points at the final climb, but was caught with around 500 m (1,600 ft) to go. The easing gradient into Rodez set up a sprint to the line with Lampre–ISD's Grega Bole launching early, but was eventually passed by Lotto–Belisol rider Gianni Meersman, who was third the previous day. Meersman held on to win ahead of Bole and Vacansoleil–DCM's Lieuwe Westra, whose bonus seconds on the line enabled him to surpass Valverde for sixth place in the general classification. Other than Maté assuming the mountains lead from De Gendt, none of the other jerseys changed hands as Wiggins, Valverde and Tejay van Garderen (BMC Racing Team) all finished safely in the pack.

Stage 4 result

| | Rider | Team | Time |
|---|---|---|---|
| 1 | Gianni Meersman (BEL) | Lotto–Belisol | 4h 21' 01" |
| 2 | Grega Bole (SLO) | Lampre–ISD | s.t. |
| 3 | Lieuwe Westra (NED) | Vacansoleil–DCM | s.t. |
| 4 | Xavier Florencio (ESP) | Team Katusha | s.t. |
| 5 | Jonathan Hivert (FRA) | Saur–Sojasun | s.t. |
| 6 | Simon Geschke (GER) | Project 1t4i | s.t. |
| 7 | Nicolas Roche (IRL) | Ag2r–La Mondiale | s.t. |
| 8 | Alejandro Valverde (ESP) | Movistar Team | s.t. |
| 9 | Francesco Gavazzi (ITA) | Astana | s.t. |
| 10 | Bradley Wiggins (GBR) | Team Sky | s.t. |

General Classification after Stage 4

| | Rider | Team | Time |
|---|---|---|---|
| 1 | Bradley Wiggins (GBR) | Team Sky | 13h 30' 52" |
| 2 | Levi Leipheimer (USA) | Omega Pharma–Quick-Step | + 6" |
| 3 | Tejay van Garderen (USA) | BMC Racing Team | + 11" |
| 4 | Sylvain Chavanel (FRA) | Omega Pharma–Quick-Step | + 14" |
| 5 | Maxime Monfort (BEL) | RadioShack–Nissan | + 18" |
| 6 | Lieuwe Westra (NED) | Vacansoleil–DCM | + 18" |
| 7 | Alejandro Valverde (ESP) | Movistar Team | + 20" |
| 8 | José Joaquín Rojas (ESP) | Movistar Team | + 29" |
| 9 | Simon Špilak (SLO) | Team Katusha | + 33" |
| 10 | Robert Kišerlovski (CRO) | Astana | + 36" |

=== Stage 5 ===
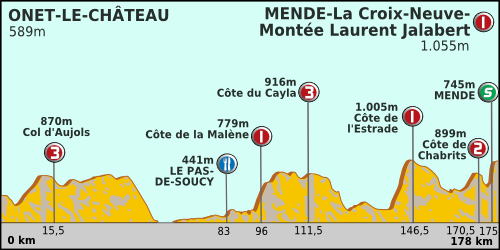
Stage profile

8 March 2012 — Onet-le-Château to Mende, 178.5 km (110.9 mi)

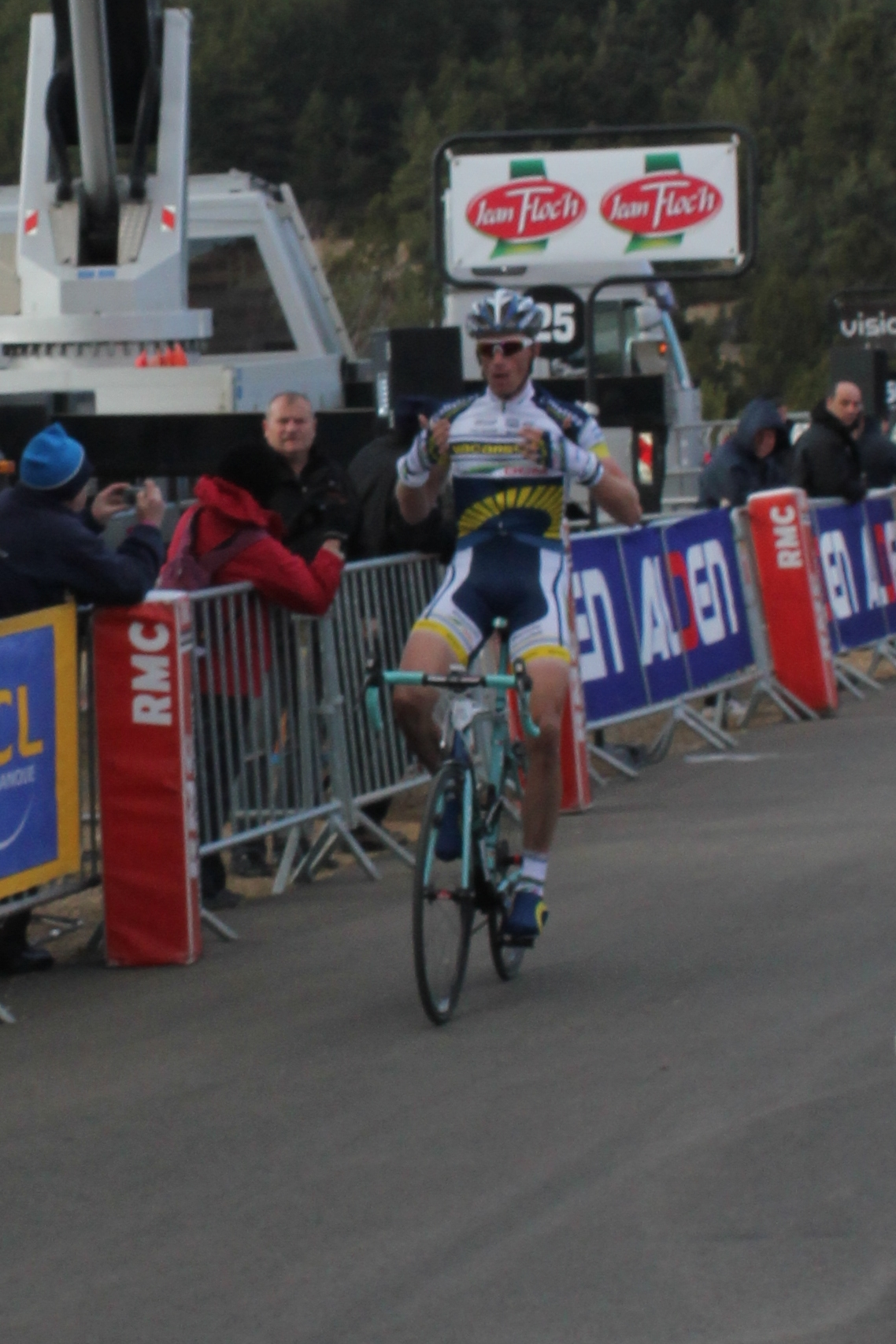
Vacansoleil–DCM's Lieuwe Westra in the closing metres at Mende. Westra's stage victory moved him into second place in the general classification, trailing overall leader Bradley Wiggins (Team Sky) by six seconds.

The race's queen stage consisted of six categorised climbs over the 178.5 km (110.9 mi) parcours, including three first-category climbs; the Côte de la Malène, the Côte de l'Estrade and the final climb to Mende, the Côte de la Croix-Neuve–Montée Laurent Jalabert – a 3 km (1.9 mi) climb at an average gradient of 10.1%, named in honour of the three-time Paris–Nice winner Laurent Jalabert – which had featured twice before as a summit finish in 2007 and 2010, won on both occasions by Alberto Contador. Many riders and teams believed that the stage suited Movistar Team's Alejandro Valverde, who had finished second on the Mende stage in 2010 before the result was expunged due to his doping suspension later in the year. Four riders – Vacansoleil–DCM's Frederik Veuchelen, GreenEDGE rider Simon Clarke, David Lelay of Saur–Sojasun and Team Europcar's Yukiya Arashiro – advanced clear of the main field after just 2 km (1.2 mi) of the stage, and managed to extend their advantage to a maximum of around seven minutes at one point during the stage.

Veuchelen earned the majority of points on offer for the mountains classification, summiting the stage's first three climbs, cresting them all ahead of Lelay and Arashiro. Movistar Team riders began to step up the pace on the front of the peloton, looking to set up the basis for an eventual attack at Mende by Valverde. With around 50 km (31.1 mi) to go, Ag2r–La Mondiale's Blel Kadri exited the race, after breaking his left scapula in a crash. On the Côte de l'Estrade, Astana's Kevin Seeldraeyers and Rabobank's Laurens ten Dam attacked off the front of the main field, and set off in chase of the lead quartet. As Veuchelen continued to rack up points towards a mountains classification lead, Seeldraeyers and ten Dam continued to close on the lead group, and with around 10 km (6.2 mi) remaining, they latched on to the group as they were on the outskirts of Mende. The peloton caught all bar Veuchelen a short time later, with Veuchelen relenting to the foot of the final climb of the Côte de la Croix-Neuve–Montée Laurent Jalabert, before he too was engulfed by the main field through the advancing pace of several teams on the front of the pack.

Team Sky then took up the reins through recent Volta ao Algarve winner Richie Porte, protecting their overall leader Bradley Wiggins; such was Porte's high tempo that less than twenty riders remained in the lead group as the race reached the final kilometre. Arnold Jeannesson attacked from the group for FDJ–BigMat, gaining several bike lengths before Wiggins upped his pace, putting youth classification leader Tejay van Garderen (BMC Racing Team) into difficulty. As Wiggins bridged up to Jeannesson, Lieuwe Westra, sixth place in the general classification overnight, attacked for Vacansoleil–DCM; pulling clear and earned the stage victory, six seconds ahead of a small group consisting of Valverde, Wiggins, Levi Leipheimer (Omega Pharma–Quick-Step) and Simon Špilak for Team Katusha. Westra moved into second place in the general classification after reducing his deficit to Wiggins, to six seconds, while Valverde and Špilak both moved ahead of van Garderen, into the top five. Jeannesson's late-stage attack was also beneficial to his overall position, as he also moved inside the top ten, into seventh position.

Stage 5 result

| | Rider | Team | Time |
|---|---|---|---|
| 1 | Lieuwe Westra (NED) | Vacansoleil–DCM | 4h 52' 46" |
| 2 | Alejandro Valverde (ESP) | Movistar Team | + 6" |
| 3 | Bradley Wiggins (GBR) | Team Sky | + 6" |
| 4 | Levi Leipheimer (USA) | Omega Pharma–Quick-Step | + 6" |
| 5 | Simon Špilak (SLO) | Team Katusha | + 6" |
| 6 | Damiano Cunego (ITA) | Lampre–ISD | + 16" |
| 7 | Arnold Jeannesson (FRA) | FDJ–BigMat | + 16" |
| 8 | Sylwester Szmyd (POL) | Liquigas–Cannondale | + 24" |
| 9 | Rigoberto Urán (COL) | Team Sky | + 24" |
| 10 | Thomas Voeckler (FRA) | Team Europcar | + 30" |

General Classification after Stage 5

| | Rider | Team | Time |
|---|---|---|---|
| 1 | Bradley Wiggins (GBR) | Team Sky | 18h 23' 40" |
| 2 | Lieuwe Westra (NED) | Vacansoleil–DCM | + 6" |
| 3 | Levi Leipheimer (USA) | Omega Pharma–Quick-Step | + 10" |
| 4 | Alejandro Valverde (ESP) | Movistar Team | + 18" |
| 5 | Simon Špilak (SLO) | Team Katusha | + 37" |
| 6 | Tejay van Garderen (USA) | BMC Racing Team | + 39" |
| 7 | Maxime Monfort (BEL) | RadioShack–Nissan | + 46" |
| 8 | Arnold Jeannesson (FRA) | FDJ–BigMat | + 1' 06" |
| 9 | Sylvain Chavanel (FRA) | Omega Pharma–Quick-Step | + 1' 16" |
| 10 | Robert Kišerlovski (CRO) | Astana | + 1' 21" |

=== Stage 6 ===
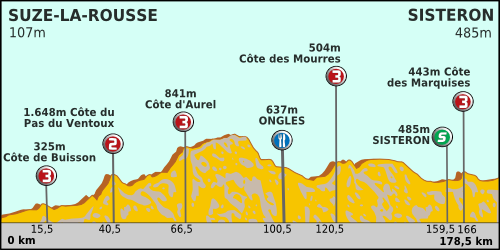
Stage profile

9 March 2012 — Suze-la-Rousse to Sisteron, 178.5 km (110.9 mi)

Just as what occurred on the second stage of the race, crosswinds caused an early fracture in the main field; inside the first 5 km (3.1 mi), a group of around thirty riders – including all the overall general classification contenders, with the exception of Alejandro Valverde (Movistar Team) and Maxime Monfort (RadioShack–Nissan) – got clear just as the race moved into the commune of Tulette. A second group of another thirty riders also formed out of the main bunch, but were quickly caught by the peloton, mainly through the acceleration of the Movistar Team, helping Valverde to get back into the stage equation. The main field reformed on the day's second categorised climb, the Côte du Pas de Ventoux, but seven riders – mountains classification leader Frederik Veuchelen (Vacansoleil–DCM), RadioShack–Nissan's Jens Voigt, Project 1t4i rider Simon Geschke, Luis León Sánchez of Rabobank, Mikaël Cherel (Ag2r–La Mondiale), FDJ–BigMat's Anthony Geslin and Daniel Navarro of Team Saxo Bank – went clear to form the day's primary breakaway.

By the time the breakaway reached the third climb of the day, the Côte d'Aurel, the gap to the main field was just under four minutes, and with Sánchez – the 2009 race-winner – less than four minutes behind overall leader Bradley Wiggins, Team Sky put their men on the front of the field in order to limit any potential gains that Sánchez could have made. The gap to the breakaway was reduced to two minutes inside the final 25 km (15.5 mi) of the stage, and as the leaders made their way through Sisteron before a 19 km (11.8 mi) finishing circuit, their lead was almost halved to 1' 10". Sánchez, Voigt and Cherel went clear of their four other companions as they crested the final climb of the day, the Côte des Marquises with around 12 km (7.5 mi) left in the stage. Cherel was dropped several minutes later, and with the main bunch not closing quickly enough to force a field sprint for the honours, it was left to Sánchez and Voigt to do battle themselves. Voigt launched first but Sánchez held enough in reserve to out-sprint his rival, by a wheel length, for his fourth career Paris–Nice stage victory. Garmin–Barracuda's Heinrich Haussler led home the main field in third place, fourteen seconds in arrears of Sánchez and Voigt, while the overall contenders finished safely in the pack, causing no changes to the top ten placings.

Stage 6 result

| | Rider | Team | Time |
|---|---|---|---|
| 1 | Luis León Sánchez (ESP) | Rabobank | 4h 07' 58" |
| 2 | Jens Voigt (GER) | RadioShack–Nissan | s.t. |
| 3 | Heinrich Haussler (AUS) | Garmin–Barracuda | + 14" |
| 4 | Elia Viviani (ITA) | Liquigas–Cannondale | + 14" |
| 5 | Grega Bole (SLO) | Lampre–ISD | + 14" |
| 6 | Alexander Kristoff (NOR) | Team Katusha | + 14" |
| 7 | Samuel Dumoulin (FRA) | Cofidis | + 14" |
| 8 | Romain Feillu (FRA) | Vacansoleil–DCM | + 14" |
| 9 | Koen de Kort (NED) | Project 1t4i | + 14" |
| 10 | Jacopo Guarnieri (ITA) | Astana | + 14" |

General Classification after Stage 6

| | Rider | Team | Time |
|---|---|---|---|
| 1 | Bradley Wiggins (GBR) | Team Sky | 22h 31' 52" |
| 2 | Lieuwe Westra (NED) | Vacansoleil–DCM | + 6" |
| 3 | Levi Leipheimer (USA) | Omega Pharma–Quick-Step | + 10" |
| 4 | Alejandro Valverde (ESP) | Movistar Team | + 18" |
| 5 | Simon Špilak (SLO) | Team Katusha | + 37" |
| 6 | Tejay van Garderen (USA) | BMC Racing Team | + 39" |
| 7 | Maxime Monfort (BEL) | RadioShack–Nissan | + 46" |
| 8 | Arnold Jeannesson (FRA) | FDJ–BigMat | + 1' 06" |
| 9 | Sylvain Chavanel (FRA) | Omega Pharma–Quick-Step | + 1' 16" |
| 10 | Robert Kišerlovski (CRO) | Astana | + 1' 21" |

=== Stage 7 ===
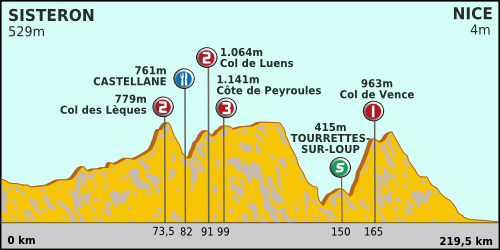
Stage profile

10 March 2012 — Sisteron to Nice, 219.5 km (136.4 mi)

Mini-attacks set the course for the stage as the field remained as one, for much of the first hour of racing. It was not until after 48 km (29.8 mi) that the stage's primary breakaway had been formed. Two riders – Thomas De Gendt of Vacansoleil–DCM and Cofidis's Rein Taaramäe – originally managed to breach the confines of the field, and set off in a bid to extend a substantial advantage of the main field, as both riders featured a long way down the general classification. Taaramäe's presence in the breakaway came just 12 km (7.5 mi) after he had suffered an accident in the main field; he was looking to reduce some of his 31-minute deficit to race leader Bradley Wiggins (Team Sky), while De Gendt was half that margin behind Wiggins, trailing by 15' 44".

By the time that De Gendt and Taaramäe had reached the stage's opening climb of the day, the Col des Leques, the duo held an advantage of over eight minutes to the main field, before later extending that gap out to twelve minutes around 15 km (9.3 mi) later. Astana's Evgeni Petrov gave chase on his own for around 30 km (18.6 mi), but was eventually recaptured by the peloton, still twelve minutes in arrears of De Gendt and Taaramäe. The lead duo were in the process of attacking one another on the Col de Vence, with De Gendt eventually breaking Taaramäe's resistance, and ultimately soloed the remaining 60 km (37.3 mi) of the stage to take his team's third victory of the race, after prior victories for Gustav Larsson and Lieuwe Westra. Taaramäe also remained clear of the main field, finishing second, but over six minutes down on De Gendt.

A further three minutes passed before the main field crossed the finish line on the Promenade des Anglais, led over the line by Project 1t4i rider John Degenkolb, Greg Henderson of Lotto–Belisol and BMC Racing Team's Thor Hushovd. Wiggins maintained his six-second lead over Westra in the overall classification, as both riders finished safely in the pack, however this was not the case for Levi Leipheimer, who had been lying in third place overnight for Omega Pharma–Quick-Step. In the second half of the stage alone, Leipheimer crashed on three separate occasions, and thus finished over seven minutes behind his rivals for overall victory, thereby ending his chances of winning the race and the chances of becoming the first American since Floyd Landis, in 2006, to win the race.

Stage 7 result

| | Rider | Team | Time |
|---|---|---|---|
| 1 | Thomas De Gendt (BEL) | Vacansoleil–DCM | 5h 11' 48" |
| 2 | Rein Taaramäe (EST) | Cofidis | + 6' 18" |
| 3 | John Degenkolb (GER) | Project 1t4i | + 9' 24" |
| 4 | Greg Henderson (NZL) | Lotto–Belisol | + 9' 24" |
| 5 | Thor Hushovd (NOR) | BMC Racing Team | + 9' 24" |
| 6 | José Joaquín Rojas (ESP) | Movistar Team | + 9' 24" |
| 7 | Romain Feillu (FRA) | Vacansoleil–DCM | + 9' 24" |
| 8 | Simon Clarke (AUS) | GreenEDGE | + 9' 24" |
| 9 | Xavier Florencio (ESP) | Team Katusha | + 9' 24" |
| 10 | Grega Bole (SLO) | Lampre–ISD | + 9' 24" |

General Classification after Stage 7

| | Rider | Team | Time |
|---|---|---|---|
| 1 | Bradley Wiggins (GBR) | Team Sky | 27h 53' 04" |
| 2 | Lieuwe Westra (NED) | Vacansoleil–DCM | + 6" |
| 3 | Alejandro Valverde (ESP) | Movistar Team | + 18" |
| 4 | Simon Špilak (SLO) | Team Katusha | + 37" |
| 5 | Tejay van Garderen (USA) | BMC Racing Team | + 39" |
| 6 | Maxime Monfort (BEL) | RadioShack–Nissan | + 46" |
| 7 | Arnold Jeannesson (FRA) | FDJ–BigMat | + 1' 06" |
| 8 | Sylvain Chavanel (FRA) | Omega Pharma–Quick-Step | + 1' 16" |
| 9 | Robert Kišerlovski (CRO) | Astana | + 1' 21" |
| 10 | Ángel Vicioso (ESP) | Team Katusha | + 2' 24" |

=== Stage 8 ===
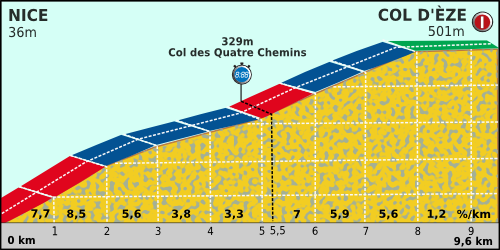
Stage profile

11 March 2012 — Nice to Col d'Èze, 9.6 km (6.0 mi) (ITT)

For the final time trial stage, the race returned to the Col d'Èze for a mountain time trial for the first time since 2001 – although the first time since 1995 in its once traditional place as the final stage of the race – when Dario Frigo of the Fassa Bortolo team triumphed by almost half a minute from his nearest rivals. As was customary of time trial stages, cyclists set off in reverse order from where they were ranked in the general classification at the end of the previous stage. Thus, Jarosław Marycz of Team Saxo Bank, who, in 145th place, trailed overall leader Bradley Wiggins (Team Sky) by one hour, eighteen minutes and fifty-three seconds, was the first rider to set off on the final stage. Marycz set a time of 23' 32" for the 4.7% average gradient climb.

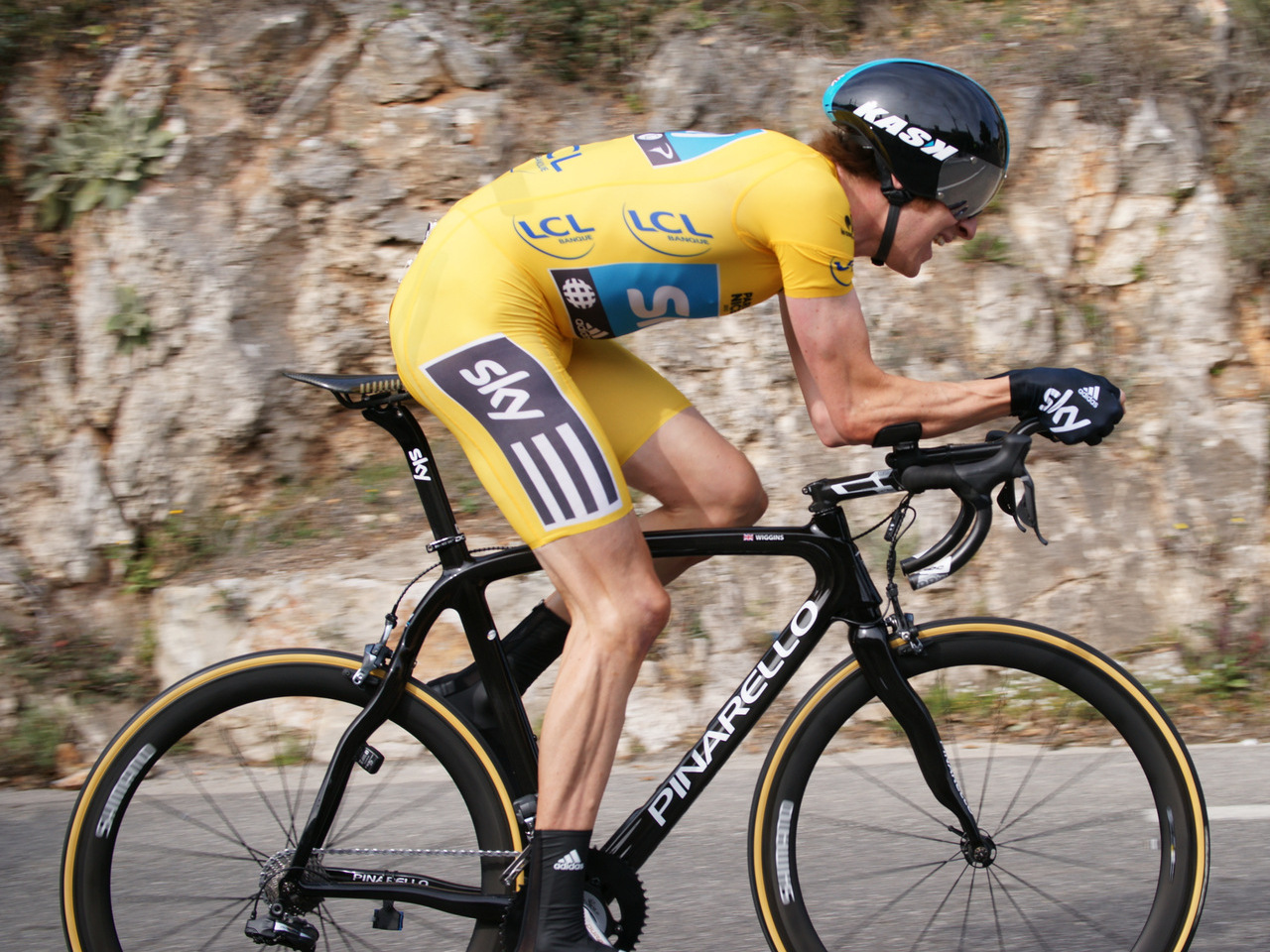
Bradley Wiggins won the final stage of the race by two seconds, to win the race overall by eight seconds over Lieuwe Westra.

Liquigas–Cannondale rider Tiziano Dall'Antonia was the first to break 23 minutes for the climb, but his stay at the top of the standings was short as Wiggins' team-mate Danny Pate, a former world time trial champion at under-23 level, went substantially quicker than Dall'Antonia, setting a benchmark of 21' 29" for the climb. Wiggins shadowed his team-mate's run, in a car following him up the hill, to gather information about what lay ahead before his start time. Pate's time held for almost 20 minutes until Lotto–Belisol's Bart De Clercq bettered his time, breaking the 21-minute barrier. French riders then lowered the benchmark yet further; David Moncoutié, who finished fourth in the race's last time trial at the Col d'Èze, recorded a time of 20' 11" for Cofidis, but Jean-Christophe Péraud usurped that with the first sub 20-minute time. The Ag2r–La Mondiale rider, the 2009 national time trial champion, recorded a time of 19' 45"; a time that left his team manager Vincent Lavenu elated, with Péraud later expressing his surprise at such a quick time.

Péraud's time remained untouched until the final group of riders set off, and with Team Katusha's Simon Špilak coming closest to Péraud in a time of 19' 59", having faded from a similar time at the intermediate point of the Col des Quatre Chemins, the stage battle ultimately came down to the two riders in contention for the overall honours; Wiggins and Vacansoleil–DCM's Lieuwe Westra. Westra set off two minutes before Wiggins, and although noted as proficient in the time trial discipline, he left everything on the hill as he set the fastest time to the intermediate checkpoint; recording a time of 11' 29", taking around three seconds per kilometre out of Péraud's time of 11' 47". Two minutes later, Wiggins passed the same point two seconds slower than Westra, but a stronger second half to the stage sealed the victory for Wiggins; as the hill flattened, Wiggins' time-trial experience proved pivotal as he overhauled the deficit to Westra, and finished the stage with a two-second advantage over Westra, taking the stage win, overall victory and the points classification in one fell swoop. Movistar Team's Alejandro Valverde, who had held the lead of the points classification prior to the stage, could only muster sixth on the stage, but this result was good enough for him to claim the final remaining place on the podium.

Stage 8 result

| | Rider | Team | Time |
|---|---|---|---|
| 1 | Bradley Wiggins (GBR) | Team Sky | 19' 12" |
| 2 | Lieuwe Westra (NED) | Vacansoleil–DCM | + 2" |
| 3 | Jean-Christophe Péraud (FRA) | Ag2r–La Mondiale | + 33" |
| 4 | Simon Špilak (SLO) | Team Katusha | + 47" |
| 5 | Jérôme Coppel (FRA) | Saur–Sojasun | + 51" |
| 6 | Alejandro Valverde (ESP) | Movistar Team | + 52" |
| 7 | Andreas Klöden (GER) | RadioShack–Nissan | + 58" |
| 8 | David Moncoutié (FRA) | Cofidis | + 59" |
| 9 | Damiano Cunego (ITA) | Lampre–ISD | + 59" |
| 10 | Rigoberto Urán (COL) | Team Sky | + 1' 06" |

Final General Classification

| | Rider | Team | Time |
|---|---|---|---|
| 1 | Bradley Wiggins (GBR) | Team Sky | 28h 12' 16" |
| 2 | Lieuwe Westra (NED) | Vacansoleil–DCM | + 8" |
| 3 | Alejandro Valverde (ESP) | Movistar Team | + 1' 10" |
| 4 | Simon Špilak (SLO) | Team Katusha | + 1' 24" |
| 5 | Tejay van Garderen (USA) | BMC Racing Team | + 1' 54" |
| 6 | Arnold Jeannesson (FRA) | FDJ–BigMat | + 2' 13" |
| 7 | Maxime Monfort (BEL) | RadioShack–Nissan | + 2' 21" |
| 8 | Sylvain Chavanel (FRA) | Omega Pharma–Quick-Step | + 2' 42" |
| 9 | Robert Kišerlovski (CRO) | Astana | + 3' 30" |
| 10 | Ángel Vicioso (ESP) | Team Katusha | + 3' 59" |

== Classification leadership progress ==
In the 2012 Paris–Nice, four different jerseys were awarded. For the general classification, calculated by adding each cyclist's finishing times on each stage, and allowing time bonuses for the first three finishers on mass-start stages, the leader received a yellow jersey. This classification was considered the most important of the 2012 Paris–Nice, and the winner of the classification was considered the winner of the race.

Additionally, there was a points classification, which awarded a green jersey. In the points classification, cyclists got points for finishing in the top 20 in a stage. Unlike in the better known points classification in the Tour de France, the type of stage had no effect on what points were on offer – each stage had the same points available on the same scale. The win earned 25 points, second place earned 22 points, third 20, fourth 18, fifth 16, and one point fewer per place down to a single point for 20th. In addition, points could be won in intermediate sprints; three points for crossing the sprint line first, two points for second place, and one for third.

There was also a mountains classification, the leadership of which was marked by a red and white polka-dot jersey. In the mountains classification, points were won by reaching the top of a climb before other cyclists. Each climb was categorised as either first, second, or third-category, with more points available for the higher-categorised climbs. For first-category climbs, points were awarded on a scale of 10 points for first across the climb, second place earned 8 points, third 6, fourth 4, and one point fewer per place down to a single point for seventh. Second-category climbs awarded points on a scale of 7 points for first place, second place earned 5 points, third 3, and one point fewer per place down to a single point for fifth. Third-category climbs awarded points to the top three riders only; 4 points for first across the climb, second place earned 2 points, third place earned 1 point.

The fourth jersey represented the young rider classification, marked by a white jersey. This was decided the same way as the general classification, but only riders born after 1 January 1987 were eligible to be ranked in the classification.

There was also a classification for teams, in which the times of the best three cyclists per team on each stage were added together; the leading team at the end of the race was the team with the lowest total time.

| Stage | Winner | General Classification | Points Classification | Mountains Classification | Young Rider Classification | Team Classification |
|---|---|---|---|---|---|---|
| 1 | Gustav Larsson | Gustav Larsson | Gustav Larsson | Thomas De Gendt | Tejay van Garderen | Omega Pharma–Quick-Step |
| 2 | Tom Boonen | Bradley Wiggins | Tom Boonen | Thomas De Gendt | Tejay van Garderen | Omega Pharma–Quick-Step |
| 3 | Alejandro Valverde | Bradley Wiggins | Alejandro Valverde | Thomas De Gendt | Tejay van Garderen | Omega Pharma–Quick-Step |
| 4 | Gianni Meersman | Bradley Wiggins | Alejandro Valverde | Luis Ángel Maté | Tejay van Garderen | Omega Pharma–Quick-Step |
| 5 | Lieuwe Westra | Bradley Wiggins | Alejandro Valverde | Frederik Veuchelen | Tejay van Garderen | Omega Pharma–Quick-Step |
| 6 | Luis León Sánchez | Bradley Wiggins | Alejandro Valverde | Frederik Veuchelen | Tejay van Garderen | Omega Pharma–Quick-Step |
| 7 | Thomas De Gendt | Bradley Wiggins | Alejandro Valverde | Frederik Veuchelen | Tejay van Garderen | Vacansoleil–DCM |
| 8 | Bradley Wiggins | Bradley Wiggins | Bradley Wiggins | Frederik Veuchelen | Tejay van Garderen | Vacansoleil–DCM |
| Final | | Bradley Wiggins | Bradley Wiggins | Frederik Veuchelen | Tejay van Garderen | Vacansoleil–DCM |
