= Théodelinde Bourcin-Dubouché =

19th-century Roman Catholic French nun and artist

Venerable Marie-Thérèse of the Heart of Jesus, A.R.
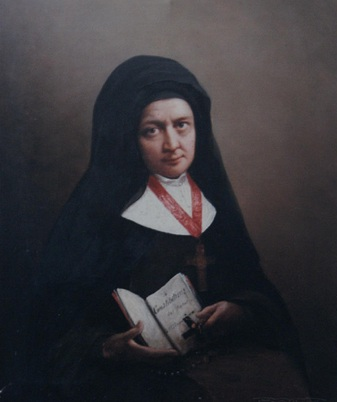

Virgin and foundress
- Born: Théodelinde Bourcin-Dubouché; 2 May 1809; Montauban, Tarn-et-Garonne, France
- Died: 30 August 1863 (aged 54); Paris, France
- Venerated in: Roman Catholicism (Sisters of Adoration)
- Major shrine: Couvent d'Adoration, 39 rue Gay Lussac, 75005 Paris, France
- Major works: Foundress of the Sisters of Adoration in Paris, France

Théodelinde Bourcin-Dubouché, known commonly as Marie-Thérèse of the Heart of Jesus (French: Marie-Thérèse du Cœur de Jésus) (2 May 1809, Montauban – 30 August 1863, Paris), was a Roman Catholic French nun, artist, and founder of the Sisters of Adoration in Paris, France. The cause for her canonization has been formally accepted by the Holy See, and thus she has been declared "venerable".

== Life ==
=== Early life ===
She was born in 1809 in the city of Montauban, Tarn-et-Garonne, the daughter of Jean-Baptiste Bourcin du Bouché, Sieur of Bouchet, (1772–1852), a high government official who served at that time as a Treasurer General of the French First Republic, and of Marie Élisabeth Carlotta Marini. The family was not religious, but rather enthusiasts of the arts. A nephew, Adrien Dubouché (1818–1881), later became a major collector of ceramics, whose contributions became the nucleus of the Musée national Adrien-Dubouché in Limoges.

In this environment, Dubouché's artistic skills were encouraged and in 1833 she moved to Paris and began formal studies in the studio of François-Louis Dejuinne, who was known for his historical and religious paintings. She threw herself into her painting, spending eight to ten hours daily in the studio, producing primarily works with religious themes. At the same time, she regularly participated in the social life of Parisian society, frequently attending concerts, the theater and gatherings of literary societies, where she was noted for her high spirits and enthusiasm.

In following her craft, however, Dubouché slowly developed an awareness of the suffering of people around her, especially the poor, which was leading her to a deeper love of Jesus Christ. In 1846, while in prayer at the Cathedral of Notre Dame, she experienced the first of several mystical visions which occurred until 1848 and were to effect the direction of her life. The first was a vision of the Blessed Sacrament. On 25 February 1847 she had a vision of Christ crowned with thorns, his head covered with a veil, who spoke to her. She then painted this vision.

Feeling that she had received a call from God to a more exacting form of spiritual life, Dubouché and her father were allowed to take up residence in an outlying building of the Monastery of the Discalced Carmelite nuns in Paris (then located on a portion of their original cloister in the Faubourg Saint-Jacques) with the intention of entering the monastery. Shortly after this move, the uprisings of the Revolution of 1848 started, in the course of which many attacks on Catholic Church began, including the murder of Denis Auguste Affre, the Archbishop of Paris. Inspired by the spiritual revelations given to the Carmelite nun Marie of St Peter shortly before that, Bouché organized a period of forty days of prayer held in the chapel of the Carmelite friars on Place Denfert-Rochereau in order to atone for the blasphemies then taking place, in which some 2,000 people took part.

During the night of 29 June 1848, which she was spending in adoration of the Blessed Sacrament in the friars' chapel, Dubouché had her final vision of Christ. This time he appeared to her on the altar of the monastery's chapel. In this vision he asked that she offer worship and reparation for the damages to the Church which were then taking place as part of a religious community. She shared this vision with the prioress of her intended monastery, Mother Isabelle, who suggested that Dubouché found a community of Third Order Carmelites, both religious and seculars, vowed to those ends.

=== Foundress ===
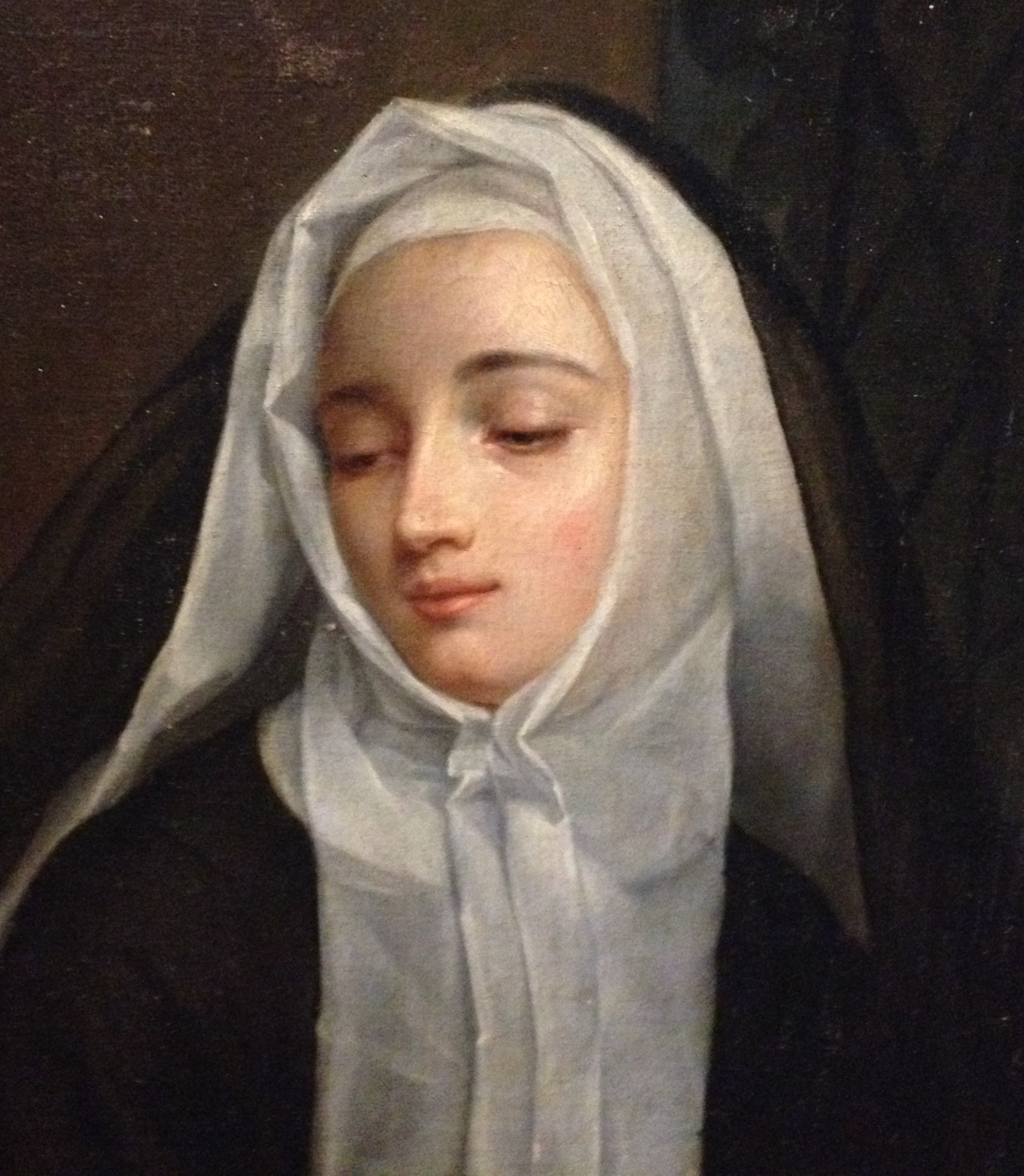
Portrait of Mother Marie-Thérése, date and painter unknown

Eight young women were found who felt called to share in this proposed way of life. With them, on 5 August 1848, Dubouché began a canonical novitiate, establishing the new community of Religious Sisters and secular tertiaries. At that point she assumed the religious name of Marie-Thérèse of the Heart of Jesus. The Sisters then took over the former Ursuline monastery which had been closed by the French Revolution, at what was then Rue des Ursulines, now 39 Rue Gay-Lussac. The small community received the formal approval of the new archbishop, Marie-Dominique-Auguste Sibour, in February 1849. Dubouché professed her initial religious vows on 29 May that year, and on 13 June received thirteen Sisters into the novitiate of the new congregation. The congregation was granted the Decretum laudis (Decree of Praise), giving conditional recognition of the community, by Pope Pius IX in 1853, achieving full papal approval under Pope Leo XIII in 1887.

In November 1855, a fire broke out in the chapel of the convent. Dubouché attempted to save the Blessed Sacrament from the tabernacle on the altar. She was badly burned in this attempt, which resulted in lifelong pain and depression. Nevertheless, she and the four remaining members of the original community made their perpetual profession of vows on 10 February 1859.

Worn out by her injuries and efforts, Dubouché died on 30 August 1863. By the end of her life, she had founded daughter communities of her foundation in two other cities of France. Six months later, her remains were transferred to the crypt of the convent.

== Veneration ==
About 1870, a cause was opened by the Archdiocese of Paris to seek Dubouché's canonization. Her spiritual writings were approved by theologians on 18 March 1909, and on 18 March 1913 her cause was formally opened in Rome, granting her the title of Servant of God. She was later given the title of Venerable.

== Legacy ==
By 2019, the congregation Dubouché had founded consisted of twenty Religious Sisters, located in three communities: the original motherhouse in Paris and two monastic communities in Ireland. Of them, the four candidates to the congregation were dismissed in September that year as it had been determined that it was deemed no longer viable as a religious community. The chapel of the motherhouse was closed that same month for renovations. As of March 2020, an announcement was made that it would remain closed indefinitely while the future of the congregation is determined.
