= Ortenburg, Bavaria =

- Municipality
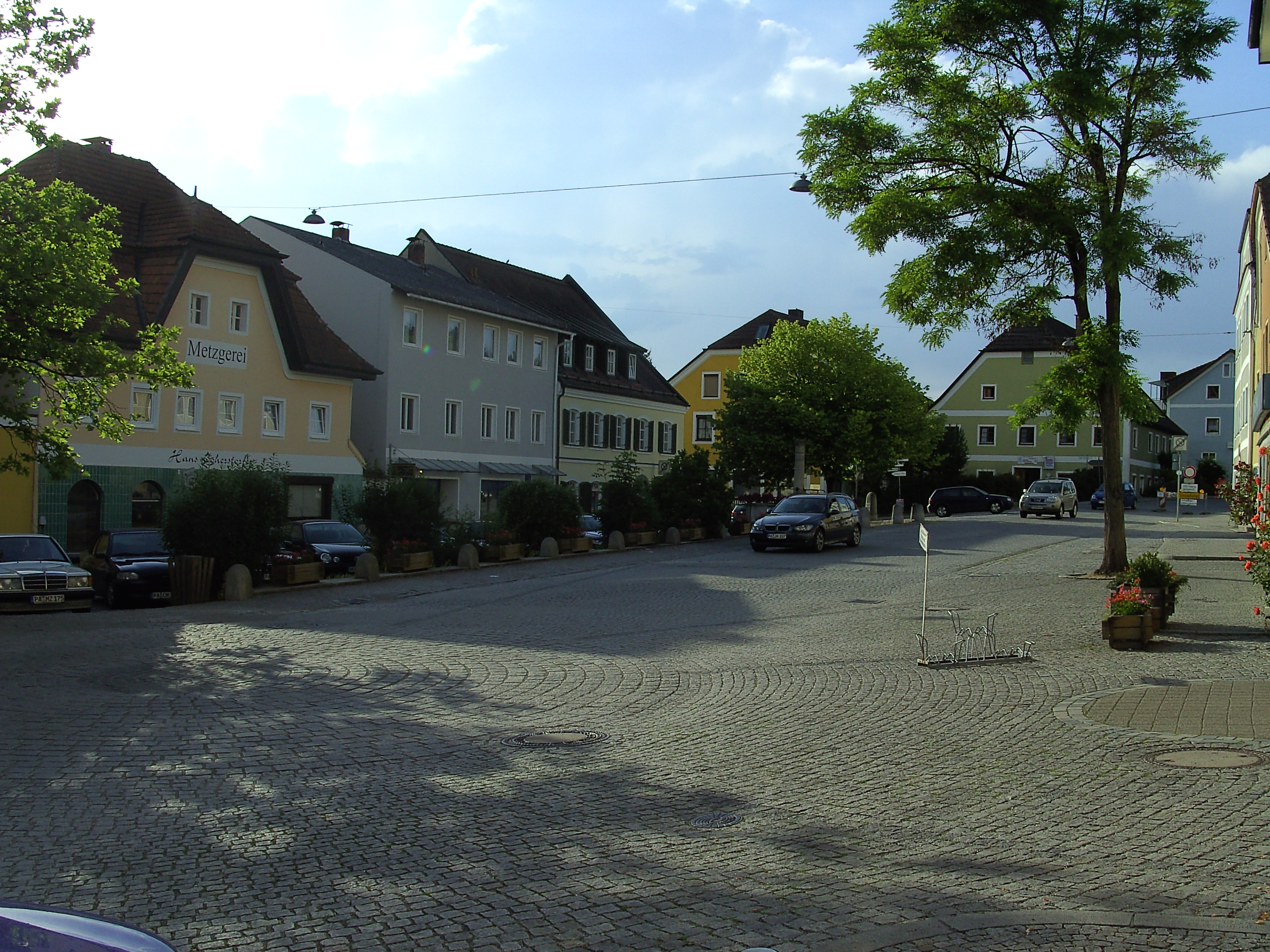
- Ortenburg town centre

- Coat of arms

- Location of Ortenburg, Bavaria within Passau district
- Interactive map of Ortenburg, Bavaria
- Location within Germany Location within Bavaria
- Coordinates: 48°32′N 13°13′E
- Country: Germany
- State: Bavaria
- Admin. region: Niederbayern
- District: Passau

Government
  - Mayor (2020–26): Stefan Lang (CSU)

Area
  - Total: 60.75 km^{2} (23.46 sq mi)
- Elevation: 358 m (1,175 ft)

Population (2025-12-31)
  - Total: 7,369
  - Density: 121.3/km^{2} (314.2/sq mi)
- Time zone: UTC+01:00 (CET)
  - Summer (DST): UTC+02:00 (CEST)
- Postal codes: 94496
- Dialling codes: 08542
- Vehicle registration: PA
- Website: www.ortenburg.de

Ortenburg (German pronunciation: [ˈɔʁtn̩bʊʁk]; Central Bavarian: Otnbuag) is a municipality and old market town in the district of Passau in Bavaria in Germany.

== Geography ==
=== Geographical location ===
Ortenburg is situated in the forested area south of the Danube and north of the Rott. It is one of the main centres of population in the Lower Bavarian Upland. The majority of the municipality is located in the Wolfach Valley and the Wolfach itself runs directly through Ortenburg.

The market town lies 20 km west of Passau, 10 km south of Vilshofen an der Donau, 12 km northwest of Bad Griesbach and 20 km north of Pocking.

=== Neighbouring municipalities ===
The closest municipalities are Haarbach, Beutelsbach, Vilshofen an der Donau, Fürstenzell, and Bad Griesbach im Rottal.

=== Villages ===
The municipality of Ortenburg consists of the market town of Ortenburg and more than 100 villages, hamlets and isolated settlements.

The most relevant villages are Dorfbach, Göbertsham, Holzkirchen, Königbach, Neustift, Oberiglbach, Sammarei, Söldenau and Unteriglbach.

Neustift is home to the St. Scholastika monastery, which is the motherhouse of the Bavarian Province of the Benedictine Sisters of Adoration in Germany.

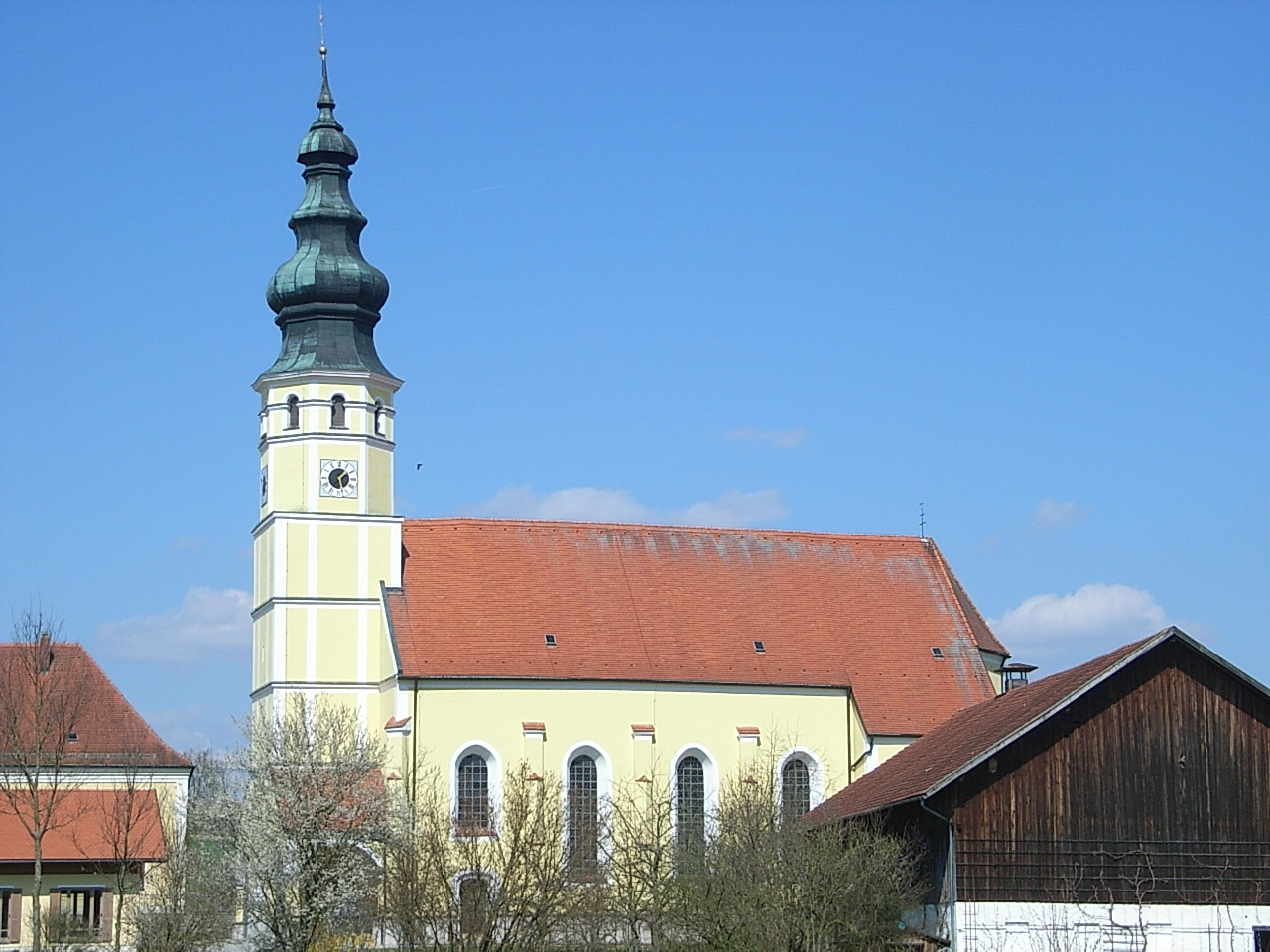
Pilgrimage Church

Sammarei (Bavarian for: St. Mary) is a Catholic place of pilgrimage. The Sammarei pilgrimage church was built by Isaak Bader and consecrated in 1631. The original chapel is still preserved behind an iconostasis-like altar wall. It contains the baroque high altar from 1772 with the miraculous image from 1631. Around the chapel there are around 1300 votive images which illustrate the importance of this place of pilgrimage. The main and side altars are merged to form a monumental five-part altar wall.

== History ==
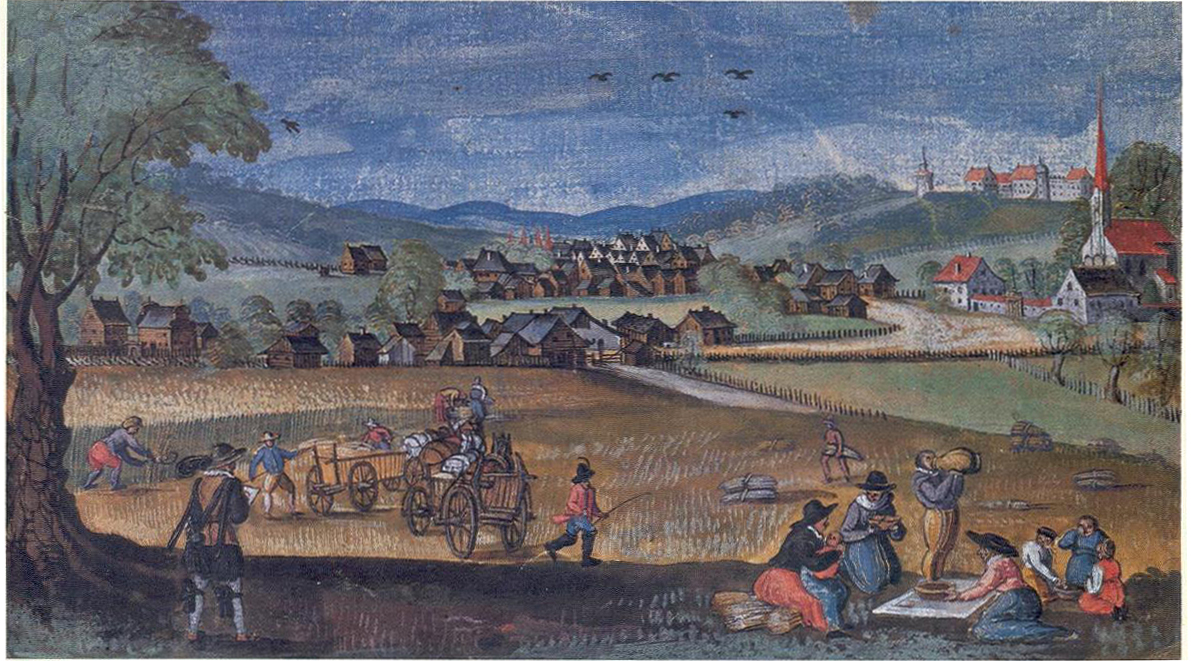
The Ortenburg Market in 1620, from a watercolour by Friedrich Casimir.

Set in the Wolfach River valley, Ortenburg can look back over a 900-year history. In about 1120 it was established by the Counts of Ortenburg (De). At the same time, the upwardly mobile von Kamm family appeared on the scene. However, during the thirteenth century, the von Kamms relocated to Hals (now a quarter of Passau). The Ortenburg counts, whose own origins lay with the Spanheimer dynasty, were keen to establish their own separate dynastic centre and such the Imperial County of Ortenburg kept its Imperial immediacy until 1806.

The Ortenburgs were among the most powerful of the Bavarian nobility, competing in terms of power and position with the Wittelsbach dynasty. During the height of their power, during the twelfth and thirteenth centuries, the Ortenburgs held lands from as far south as the Brixen valley, that extended also far into the Upper Palatinate.

=== Smuggling ===
Smuggling across the border Bibles (Martin Luther) to Habsburg: Hans Ungnad von Weißenwolff, Freiherr von Sonneck, Hans III (1493–1564), famous Bible printer and smuggler in Bad Urach Smuggler, translator and Slovene refugee Protestant preacher Primož Trubar, who published the first books in Slovene and is regarded as the key consolidator of the Slovene identity, lived in Tübingen Derendingen. In The Free Imperial City (German: Freie Reichsstadt) bibles and the Ortenburger Ratschlag was produced.

=== Krypto Protestants ===
The original chalice in the protestant worship is still in use in Ortenburg. In this time the church of Ortemburg was the only reachable protestant church outside the border Crypto-Protestantism of Habsburg Empire.

=== Mostbauern ===
The Mostbauern of Ortenburg (orchard meadow farmers) came as grower and cellar master protestant refugees from Austria.

== Notable residents ==
- Heinrich Deubel (1890–1962), Nazi SS Dachau concentration camp commandant
