= Wolfach (river) =

River in Germany

- The Wolfach at Neustift (a part of Ortenburg)

Location
- Country: Germany
- State: Bavaria

Physical characteristics
- Mouth
  - location: Danube
  - coordinates: 48.6267°N 13.2039°E
- Length: 32.1 km (19.9 mi)
- Basin size: 144 km^{2} (56 sq mi)

Basin features
- Progression: Danube→ Black Sea

Wolfach is a river of Bavaria, Germany. It flows into the Danube near Vilshofen an der Donau.

== See also ==
- List of rivers of Bavaria
