= La Garde-Adhémar =

La Garde-Adhémar La Garda d'Aimar (Occitan)
- Commune
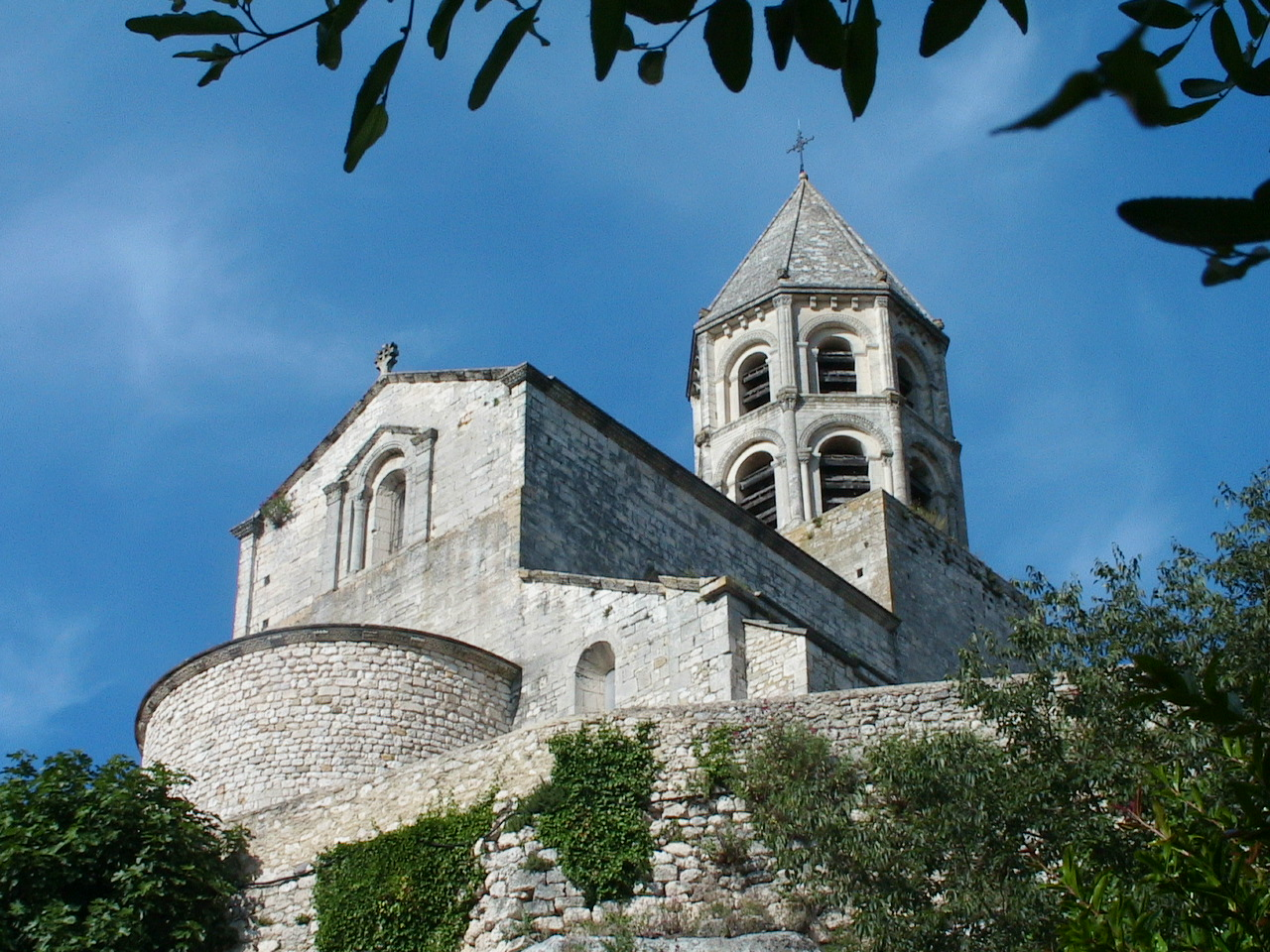
- Saint-Michel Church

- Coat of arms
- Location of La Garde-Adhémar
- Location within France Location within Auvergne-Rhône-Alpes
- Coordinates: 44°23′38″N 4°45′17″E
- Country: France
- Region: Auvergne-Rhône-Alpes
- Department: Drôme
- Arrondissement: Nyons
- Canton: Le Tricastin
- Intercommunality: CC Drôme Sud Provence

Government
  - Mayor (2020–2026): François Laplanche-Servigne
- Area^{1}: 27.73 km^{2} (10.71 sq mi)
- Highest elevation: 232 m (761 ft)
- Lowest elevation: 54 m (177 ft)
- Population (2023): 1,144
  - Density: 41.25/km^{2} (106.8/sq mi)
- Demonym: Lagardiens
- Time zone: UTC+01:00 (CET)
  - Summer (DST): UTC+02:00 (CEST)
- INSEE/Postal code: 26138 /26700
- Website: la-garde-adhemar.com
- ^{1} French Land Register data, which excludes lakes, ponds, glaciers > 1 km^{2} (0.386 sq mi or 247 acres) and river estuaries.

La Garde-Adhémar (French pronunciation: [la ɡaʁd ademaʁ]; Occitan: La Garda d'Aimar) is a commune in the Drôme department in the Auvergne-Rhône-Alpes region in Southeastern France. A member of the association Les Plus Beaux Villages de France, it is located 18.3 km (11.3 mi) south of Montélimar.

== Population ==
Historical population
Year	Pop.	±% p.a.
1968	550	—
1975	880	+6.94%
1982	1,077	+2.93%
1990	1,108	+0.36%
1999	1,075	−0.34%
2007	1,138	+0.71%
2012	1,118	−0.35%
2017	1,107	−0.20%
2023	1,144	+0.55%
Source: INSEE

== See also ==
- Communes of the Drôme department
