= Sisters of Adoration =

Religious institute of the Catholic Church

Sisters of Reparative Adoration
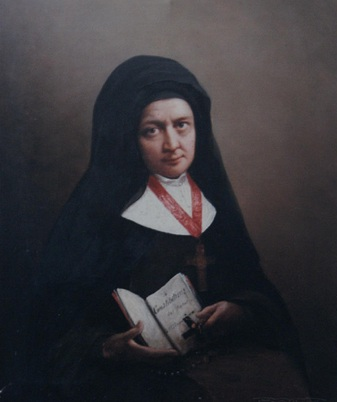
- Abbreviation: A.R.
- Established: August 6, 1848
- Founder: Théodelinde Bourcin-Dubouché
- Purpose: Eucharistic adoration, spiritual retreats
- Headquarters: 39 rue Gay Lussac, 75005 Paris, France
- Location(s): Paris, France, & Ireland
- Members: 16 (2019)
- Superior General: Mother Marie Joséphine, A.R.
- Affiliations: Catholic Church
- Website: https://www.adorationreparatrice.fr/#!sa-vie/czj7

The Sisters of Adoration, in full the Sisters of Reparative Adoration (French: Sœurs de l'Adoration réparatrice; Abbreviation: A.R.) are a Catholic enclosed religious order of women that follows the religious rule of the Discalced Carmelite Order, established in 1848 by Théodelinde Bourcin-Dubouché. They are dedicated to perpetual adoration of the Blessed Sacrament and to reparation to God for the sins of the world. To this end, they serve to help deepen the faith of laywomen though conducting spiritual retreats in their monasteries.

== History ==
Born into an aristocratic but non-religious family, Dubouché (1809–1863) grew up to be an artist who was known for her religious works as a painter. On February 25, 1847, she had a dream in which she saw Christ crowned with thorns and his head covered with a veil. She then painted this vision.

Feeling that she had received a call from God to a more exacting form of spiritual life, Dubouché and her father were allowed to take up residence in an outlying building of the Monastery of the Discalced Carmelite nuns in Paris, then located on a portion of their original cloister in the Faubourg Saint-Jacques.

During the night of June 29, 1848, which she was spending in adoration of the Blessed Sacrament, Dubouché had another vision of Christ, this time appearing on the altar of the monastery's chapel. In this vision he asked that she offer worship and reparation for the damages to the Church which were then occurring in the uprisings of the Revolutions of 1848 as part of a religious institute. She shared this vision with the prioress of the monastery, Mother Isabelle, who suggested that Dubouché found a community of the Third Order vowed to those ends. Dubouché then outlined a community of both Religious Sisters and secular tertiaries living together in community. The only distinction between the two branches would be that the secular sisters would not take a vow of poverty.

Eight young women were found who felt called to share in this proposed way of life. With them, on August 6, 1848, Dubouché began a canonical novitiate, establishing the new community of Religious Sisters and secular tertiaries. At that point she assumed the religious name of Marie-Thérèse of the Heart of Jesus. The Sisters then took over the former Ursuline monastery which had been closed by the French Revolution, at what was then Rue des Ursulines, now 39 Rue Gay-Lussac. The small community received the formal approval of the new archbishop, Marie-Dominique-Auguste Sibour, in February 1849. Dubouché professed her initial religious vows on May 29 of that year and on June 13 received thirteen Sisters into the novitiate of the new congregation. The congregation was granted the Decretum laudis (Decree of Praise), giving conditional recognition of the community, by Pope Pius IX in 1853, achieving full papal approval under Pope Leo XIII in 1887.

The Sisters then took over the former Ursuline monastery which had been closed by the French Revolution, at what was then 3 Rue des Ursulines, now 39 Rue Gay-Lussac. They were granted the Decretum laudis (Decree of Praise), giving conditional recognition of the community, by Pope Pius IX in 1853, achieving full approval under Pope Leo XIII in 1887.

New communities of the congregation were founded by Dubouché in Lyon (1850) and Châlons-en-Champagne (1860).

In the 20th century, this religious congregation was merged with two others which had been founded with similar goals:

- 1909: The Sisters of the Reparative Association, also founded in 1848 in Saint-Dizier by the Abbé Pierre Marche, who had also established the Archconfraternity of Reparation. Their goal was reparation through eucharistic adoration for the blasphemies committed by non-believers and for society's refusal to enact Sabbath laws| enforcing the biblical demand to rest on the Sabbath.
- 1939: The Sisters of Reparation, founded in 1864 by Mother Marie-Thérèse de Waroquier (born Yolande), in Saint-Affrique, whose goal was adoration and reparation.

By the end of the 20th century, the community was present in three houses: the original motherhouse in Paris and two monasteries in Ireland, in the cities of Belfast, Northern Ireland, and Ferns, County Wexford. As of 2017, they totaled 20 members.

The congregation gained some public notice in 2014, when they accepted four candidates to their way of life for the first time in nearly twenty years. The group included a well-known BBC News journalist Martina Purdy and Barrister Elaine Kelly. They received further public attention five years later when these two women announced that they had been forced to leave the monastery, as it had been decided that the congregation was not viable for future growth.

That same month, the website of the congregation announced that the chapel of the motherhouse was being closed for six months. In March 2020, it was updated to advise that it would remain closed until further notice as the future of the community is determined.
