= Canton of Le Tricastin =

Coordinates: 44.38°N 4.70°E

The canton of Le Tricastin is an administrative division of the Drôme department, southeastern France. It was created at the French canton reorganisation which came into effect in March 2015. Its seat is in Pierrelatte.

It consists of the following communes:

1. Clansayes
2. La Garde-Adhémar
3. Pierrelatte
4. Rochegude
5. Saint-Paul-Trois-Châteaux
6. Saint-Restitut
7. Solérieux
8. Suze-la-Rousse
