= Martina Purdy =

Martina Purdy, is a former print and TV journalist currently training to be a nun. Born in Belfast, she moved at an early age with her family to Canada in 1971. She earned a degree in international relations from the University of Toronto after working in local journalism in Ireland, she returned to Canada for postgraduate study at the Ryerson School of Journalism. Purdy was a business editor with the Irish News and then the Belfast Telegraph, before joining the BBC in 1999, and becoming the political correspondent for BBC Northern Ireland Television. In 2014 she left the BBC to become a nun with the Sisters of Adoration, on the Falls Road, in West Belfast, along with former Barrister Elaine Kelly. In 2019 due to the convent not having enough nuns meeting the church's rules, she and another trainee nun left formation. In 2020 she became a guide for the St. Patricks' Way, at the St. Patrick's Centre, Downpatrick.
