= Clansayes =

- Commune
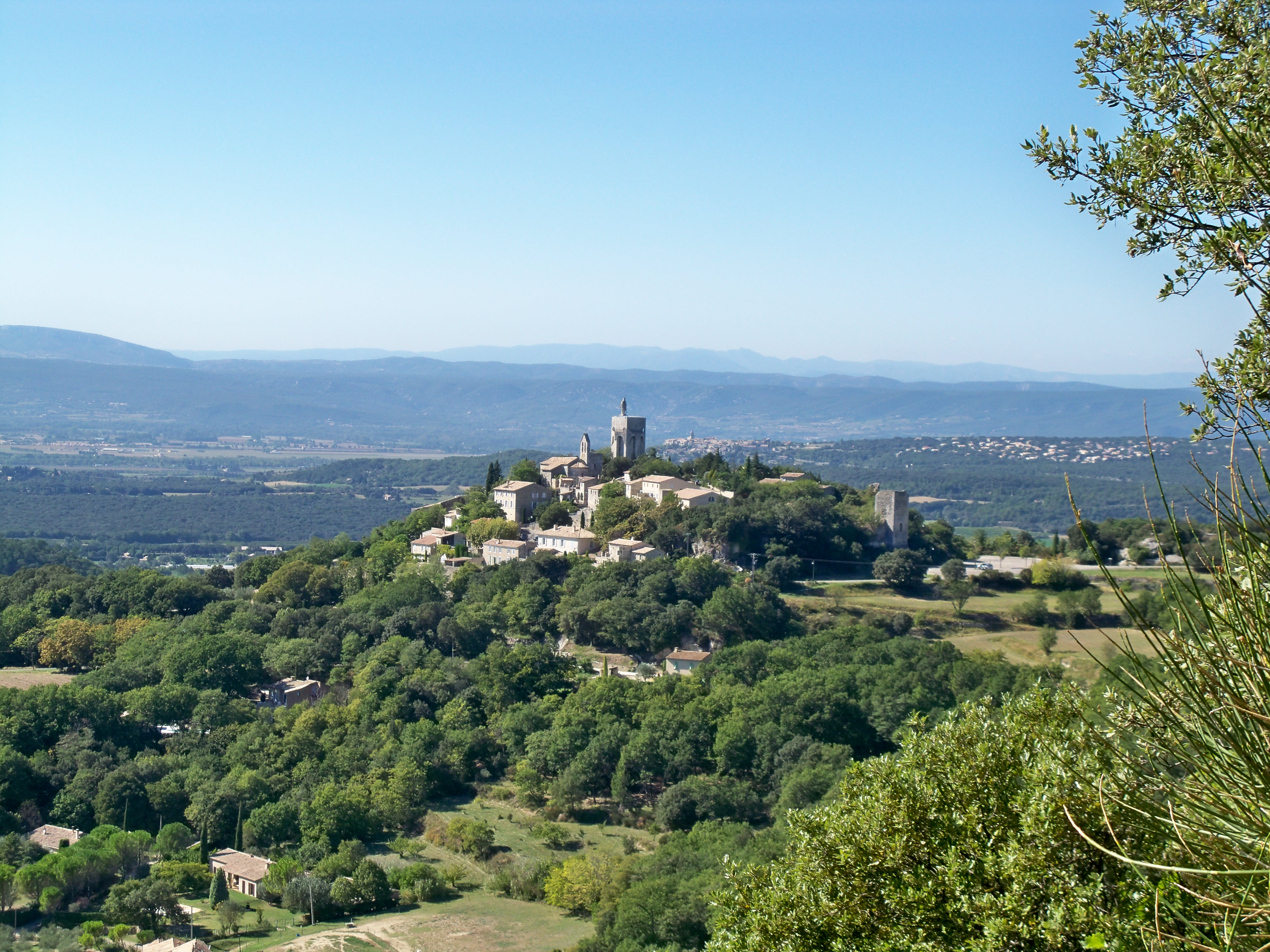
- The village of Clansayes

- Coat of arms
- Location of Clansayes
- Location within France Location within Auvergne-Rhône-Alpes
- Coordinates: 44°22′20″N 4°48′29″E
- Country: France
- Region: Auvergne-Rhône-Alpes
- Department: Drôme
- Arrondissement: Nyons
- Canton: Le Tricastin

Government
  - Mayor (2020–2026): Maryannick Garin
- Area^{1}: 14.47 km^{2} (5.59 sq mi)
- Highest elevation: 348 m (1,142 ft)
- Lowest elevation: 87 m (285 ft)
- Population (2023): 517
  - Density: 35.7/km^{2} (92.5/sq mi)
- Time zone: UTC+01:00 (CET)
  - Summer (DST): UTC+02:00 (CEST)
- INSEE/Postal code: 26093 /26130
- ^{1} French Land Register data, which excludes lakes, ponds, glaciers > 1 km^{2} (0.386 sq mi or 247 acres) and river estuaries.

Clansayes (French pronunciation: [klɑ̃saj]; Occitan: Clansaias) is a commune in the Drôme department in southeastern France.

== Population ==
Historical population
Year	Pop.	±% p.a.
1968	212	—
1975	181	−2.23%
1982	287	+6.81%
1990	408	+4.50%
1999	441	+0.87%
2007	523	+2.15%
2012	507	−0.62%
2017	529	+0.85%
2023	517	−0.38%
Source: INSEE

== See also ==
- Communes of the Drôme department
