= La Baume-de-Transit =

- Commune
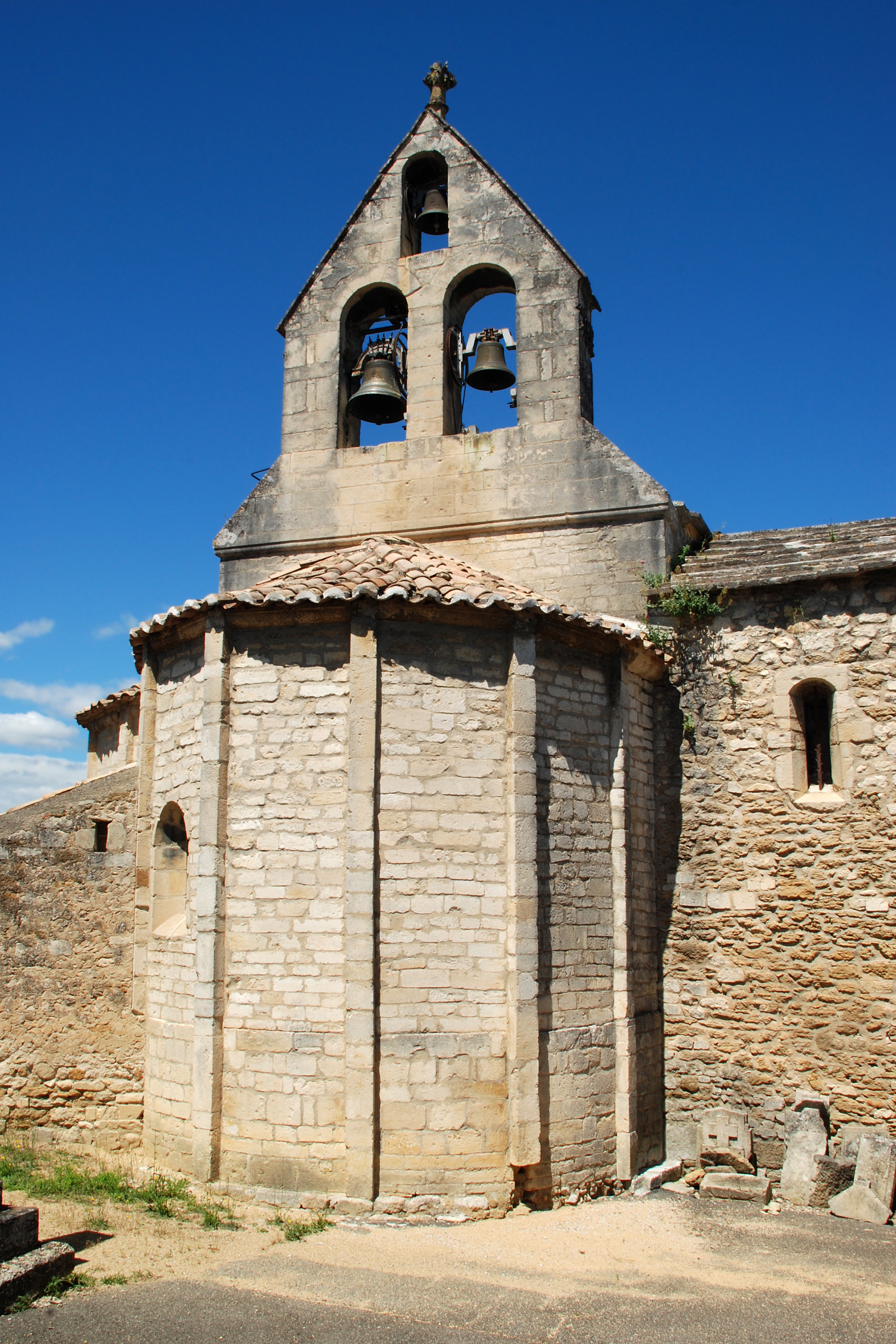
- The church of Sainte-Croix in La Baume-de-Transit
- Location of La Baume-de-Transit
- Location within France Location within Auvergne-Rhône-Alpes
- Coordinates: 44°20′21″N 4°51′57″E
- Country: France
- Region: Auvergne-Rhône-Alpes
- Department: Drôme
- Arrondissement: Nyons
- Canton: Grignan

Government
  - Mayor (2020–2026): Patrice Escoffier
- Area^{1}: 12.05 km^{2} (4.65 sq mi)
- Highest elevation: 169 m (554 ft)
- Lowest elevation: 97 m (318 ft)
- Population (2023): 942
  - Density: 78.2/km^{2} (202/sq mi)
- Time zone: UTC+01:00 (CET)
  - Summer (DST): UTC+02:00 (CEST)
- INSEE/Postal code: 26033 /26790
- ^{1} French Land Register data, which excludes lakes, ponds, glaciers > 1 km^{2} (0.386 sq mi or 247 acres) and river estuaries.

La Baume-de-Transit (French pronunciation: [la bom də tʁɑ̃zit]; Occitan: Bauma de Transit) is a commune in the Drôme department in southeastern France.

== Population ==
Historical population
Year	Pop.	±% p.a.
1968	358	—
1975	405	+1.78%
1982	513	+3.43%
1990	614	+2.27%
1999	742	+2.13%
2007	826	+1.35%
2012	842	+0.38%
2017	881	+0.91%
2023	942	+1.12%
Source: INSEE

== See also ==
- Communes of the Drôme department
