= Solérieux =

- Commune
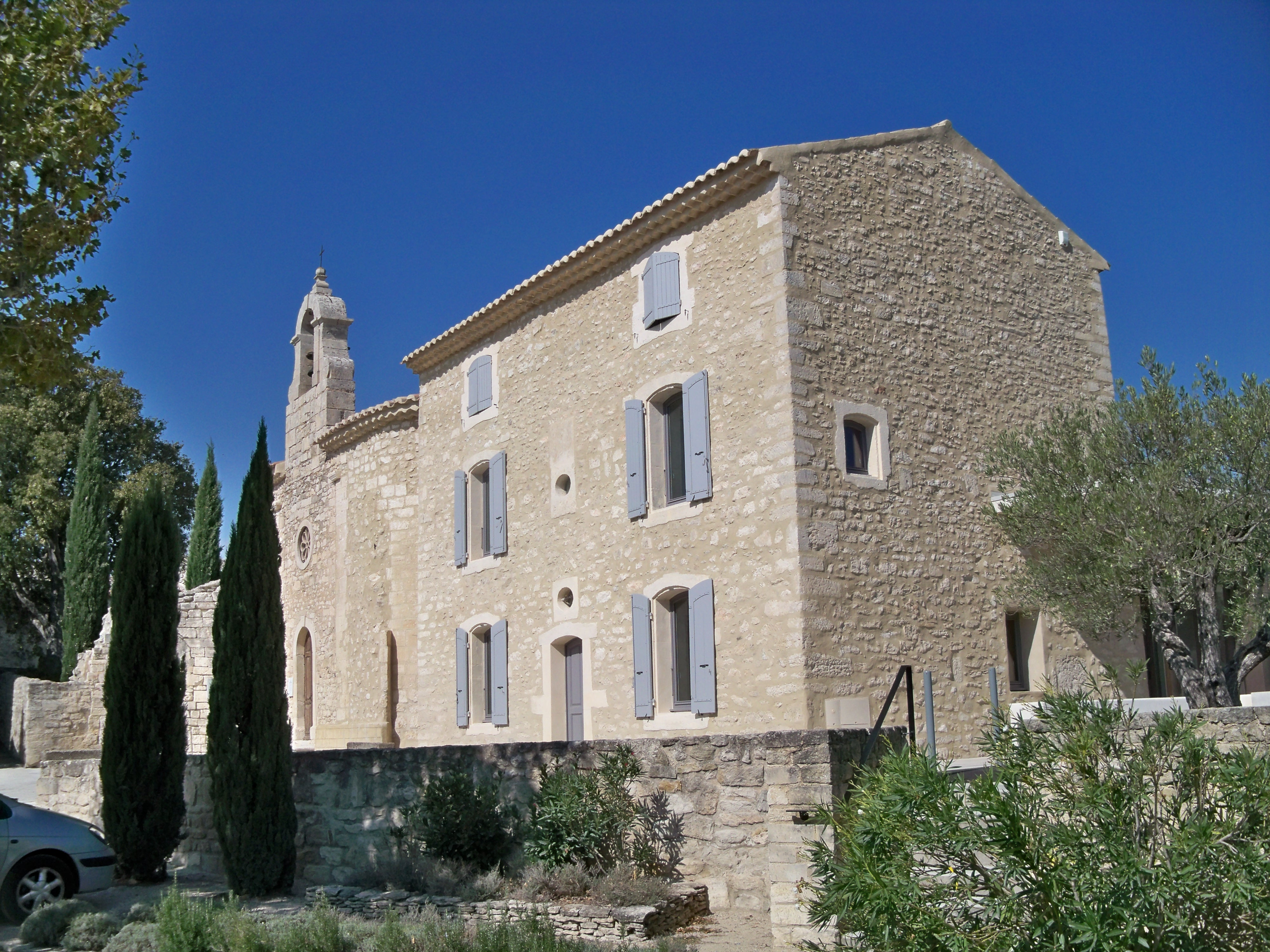
- The town hall and church of Solérieux
- Location of Solérieux
- Location within France Location within Auvergne-Rhône-Alpes
- Coordinates: 44°20′56″N 4°49′55″E
- Country: France
- Region: Auvergne-Rhône-Alpes
- Department: Drôme
- Arrondissement: Nyons
- Canton: Le Tricastin

Government
  - Mayor (2020–2026): Gérard Hortail
- Area^{1}: 8.55 km^{2} (3.30 sq mi)
- Elevation: 162 m (531 ft)
- Highest elevation: 275 m (902 ft)
- Lowest elevation: 95 m (312 ft)
- Population (2023): 328
  - Density: 38.4/km^{2} (99.4/sq mi)
- Time zone: UTC+01:00 (CET)
  - Summer (DST): UTC+02:00 (CEST)
- INSEE/Postal code: 26342 /26130
- ^{1} French Land Register data, which excludes lakes, ponds, glaciers > 1 km^{2} (0.386 sq mi or 247 acres) and river estuaries.

Solérieux (French pronunciation: [sɔleʁjø]; Occitan: Solerieu) is a commune in the Drôme department in southeastern France.

== Population ==
Historical population
Year	Pop.	±% p.a.
1968	117	—
1975	96	−2.79%
1982	132	+4.65%
1990	173	+3.44%
1999	211	+2.23%
2007	294	+4.23%
2012	333	+2.52%
2017	335	+0.12%
2023	328	−0.35%
Source: INSEE

== See also ==
- Communes of the Drôme department
