= Decretum laudis =

Official measure issued by the Holy See

A decretum laudis (Latin for 'decree of praise') is the official measure with which the Holy See grants to institutes of consecrated life and societies of apostolic life the recognition of ecclesiastical institution of pontifical right. When the decree of praise is issued in the form of an apostolic brief, it is referred to as a 'brief of praise'.

== Canon law ==
To create a new religious community, it is necessary to get, in the beginning, permission from the proper department in the Roman Curia of the Catholic Church (the Congregation for Institutes of Consecrated Life and Societies of Apostolic Life, the Congregation for the Evangelization of Peoples, or the Congregation for the Oriental Churches, depending on the purpose of the institute and the coverage of its activities) and also the approval of the Ordinary of the diocese of origin, usually the bishop (or the archbishop). When they are obtained, the congregation is then called “of diocesan right”.

When the congregation has grown in importance and when its spiritual and apostolic maturity is observed, it can be formally approved by the Pope with the decretum laudis, which transforms it into a congregation of pontifical right, subject to immediate and exclusive authority of the Holy See.

Generally, it is followed by the temporary approval and the final approval.

== Structure ==
The decretum laudis contains, as a rule, a summary of the historical origins of the congregation, and a brief description of the purpose and the constitution of the same, references and letters from the bishops, and the examination made by the appropriate Congregation of the institute. It concludes with the approval and recommendation, amplissimis verbis (Latin, “in the strongest terms”), of the institute in question.

The practice of using decretum laudis by the Popes to grant the recognition of the pontifical right to the congregations began to be consolidated in the years between the 18th and 19th centuries, although in the beginning these decrees were followed by formal acts in the form of the Papal bull and Papal brief.

== See also ==
- Institute of Consecrated Life
- Society of Apostolic Life
- List of some religious institutes (Catholic)
