= Rochegude, Drôme =

Rochegude
- Commune
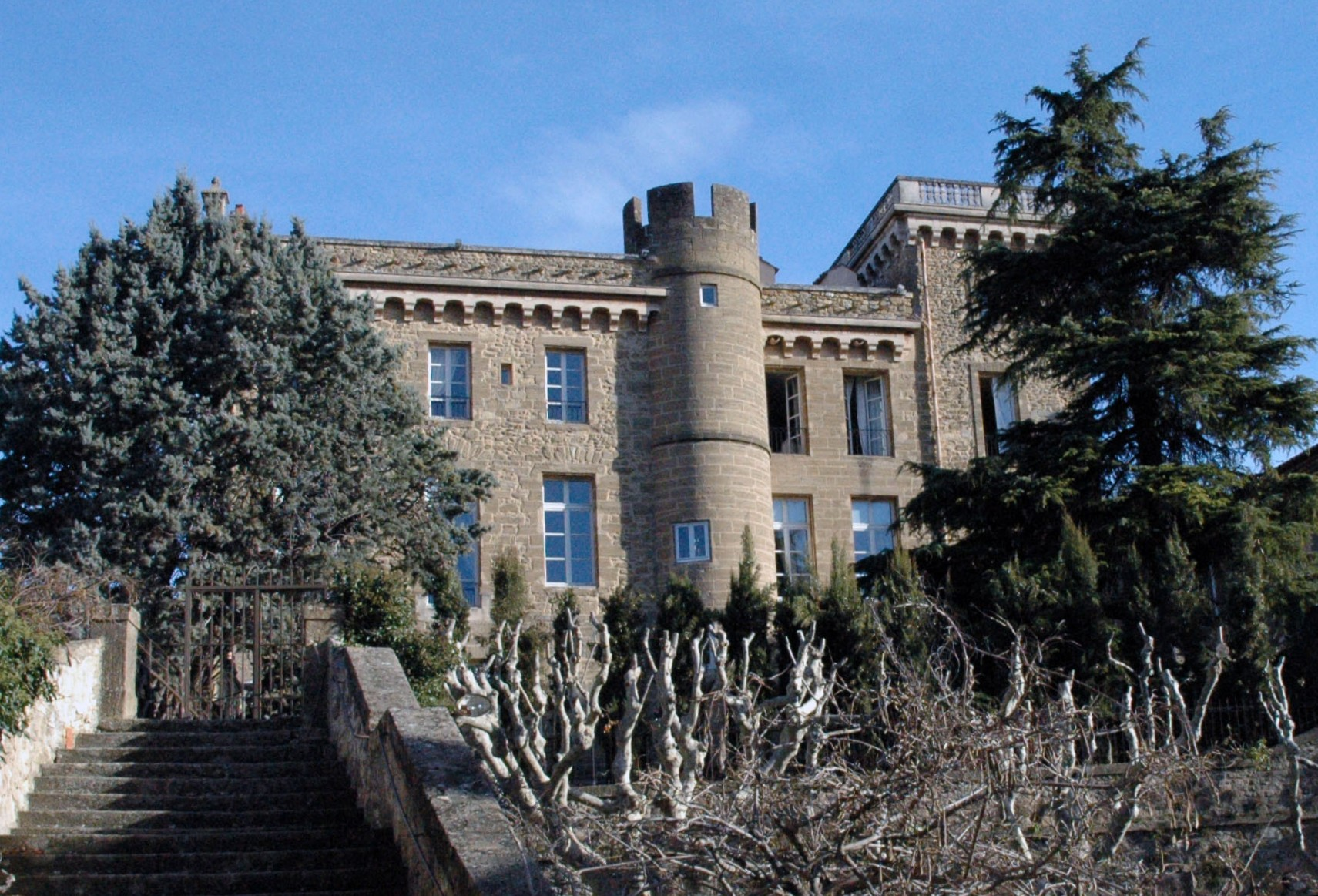
- Château de Rochegude

- Coat of arms
- Location of Rochegude
- Location within France Location within Auvergne-Rhône-Alpes
- Coordinates: 44°14′59″N 4°49′46″E
- Country: France
- Region: Auvergne-Rhône-Alpes
- Department: Drôme
- Arrondissement: Nyons
- Canton: Le Tricastin

Government
  - Mayor (2020–2026): Didier Besnier
- Area^{1}: 18.3 km^{2} (7.1 sq mi)
- Highest elevation: 284 m (932 ft)
- Lowest elevation: 83 m (272 ft)
- Population (2023): 1,678
  - Density: 91.7/km^{2} (237/sq mi)
- Time zone: UTC+01:00 (CET)
  - Summer (DST): UTC+02:00 (CEST)
- INSEE/Postal code: 26275 /26790
- ^{1} French Land Register data, which excludes lakes, ponds, glaciers > 1 km^{2} (0.386 sq mi or 247 acres) and river estuaries.

Rochegude (French pronunciation: [ʁɔʃɡyd]; Occitan: Ròchaguda) is a commune in the Drôme department in southeastern France.

== Population ==
Historical population
Year	Pop.	±% p.a.
1968	591	—
1975	684	+2.11%
1982	831	+2.82%
1990	1,053	+3.00%
1999	1,236	+1.80%
2007	1,412	+1.68%
2012	1,525	+1.55%
2017	1,579	+0.70%
2023	1,678	+1.02%
Source: INSEE

== See also ==
- Communes of the Drôme department
