= Saint-Restitut =

- Commune
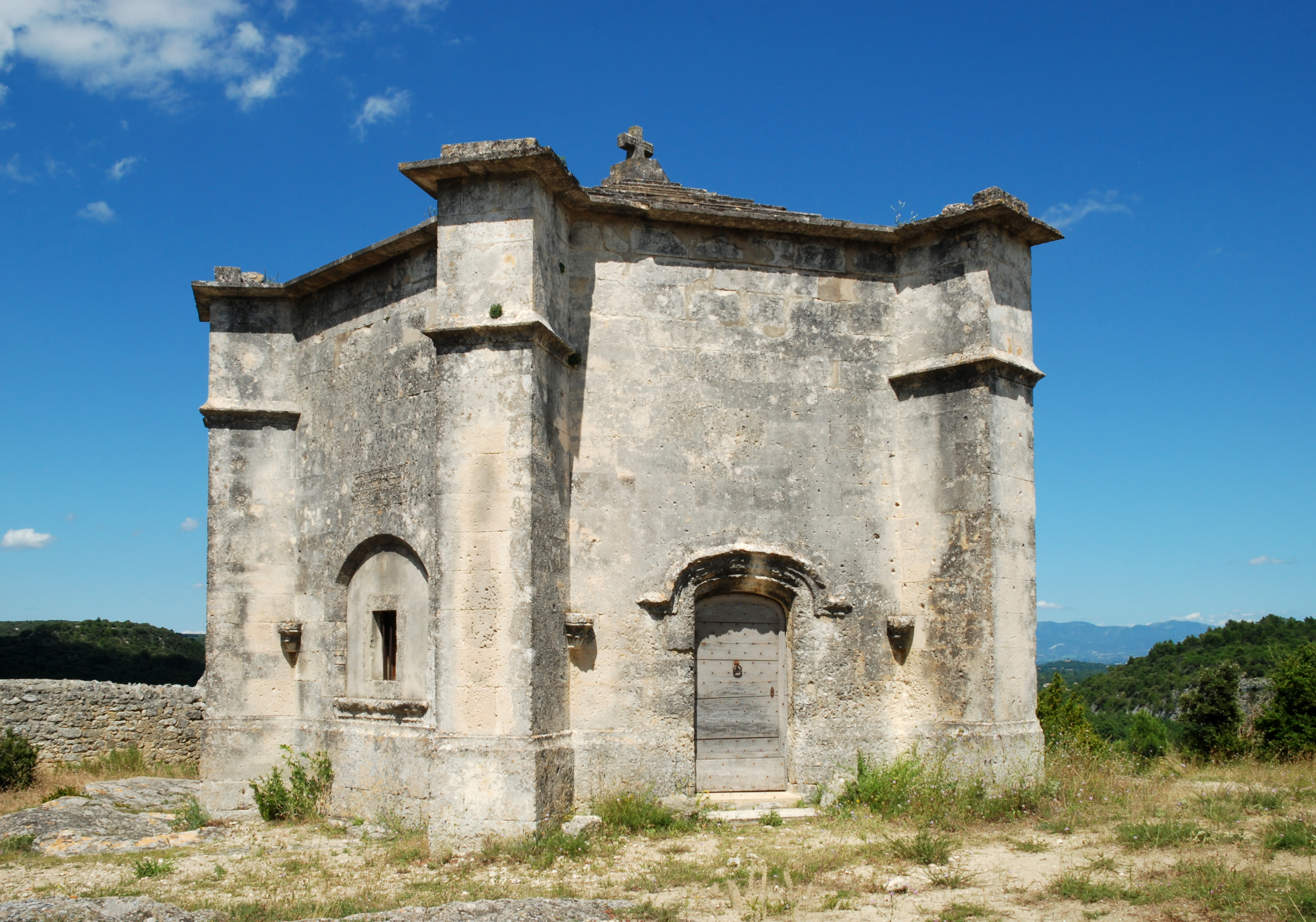
- Chapel of the Saint-Sépulcre
- Location of Saint-Restitut
- Location within France Location within Auvergne-Rhône-Alpes
- Coordinates: 44°20′N 4°47′E
- Country: France
- Region: Auvergne-Rhône-Alpes
- Department: Drôme
- Arrondissement: Nyons
- Canton: Le Tricastin

Government
  - Mayor (2020–2026): Christine Forot
- Area^{1}: 14.48 km^{2} (5.59 sq mi)
- Elevation: 210 m (690 ft)
- Highest elevation: 304 m (997 ft)
- Lowest elevation: 72 m (236 ft)
- Population (2023): 1,432
  - Density: 98.90/km^{2} (256.1/sq mi)
- Time zone: UTC+01:00 (CET)
  - Summer (DST): UTC+02:00 (CEST)
- INSEE/Postal code: 26326 /26130
- ^{1} French Land Register data, which excludes lakes, ponds, glaciers > 1 km^{2} (0.386 sq mi or 247 acres) and river estuaries.

Saint-Restitut (French pronunciation: [sɛ̃ ʁɛstity]; Occitan: Sant Restit) is a commune in the Drôme department in southeastern France.

== Population ==
Historical population
Year	Pop.	±% p.a.
1968	453	—
1975	492	+1.19%
1982	630	+3.60%
1990	947	+5.23%
1999	1,243	+3.07%
2007	1,363	+1.16%
2012	1,371	+0.12%
2017	1,387	+0.23%
2023	1,432	+0.53%
Source: INSEE

== See also ==
- Communes of the Drôme department
