= Tulette =

- Commune
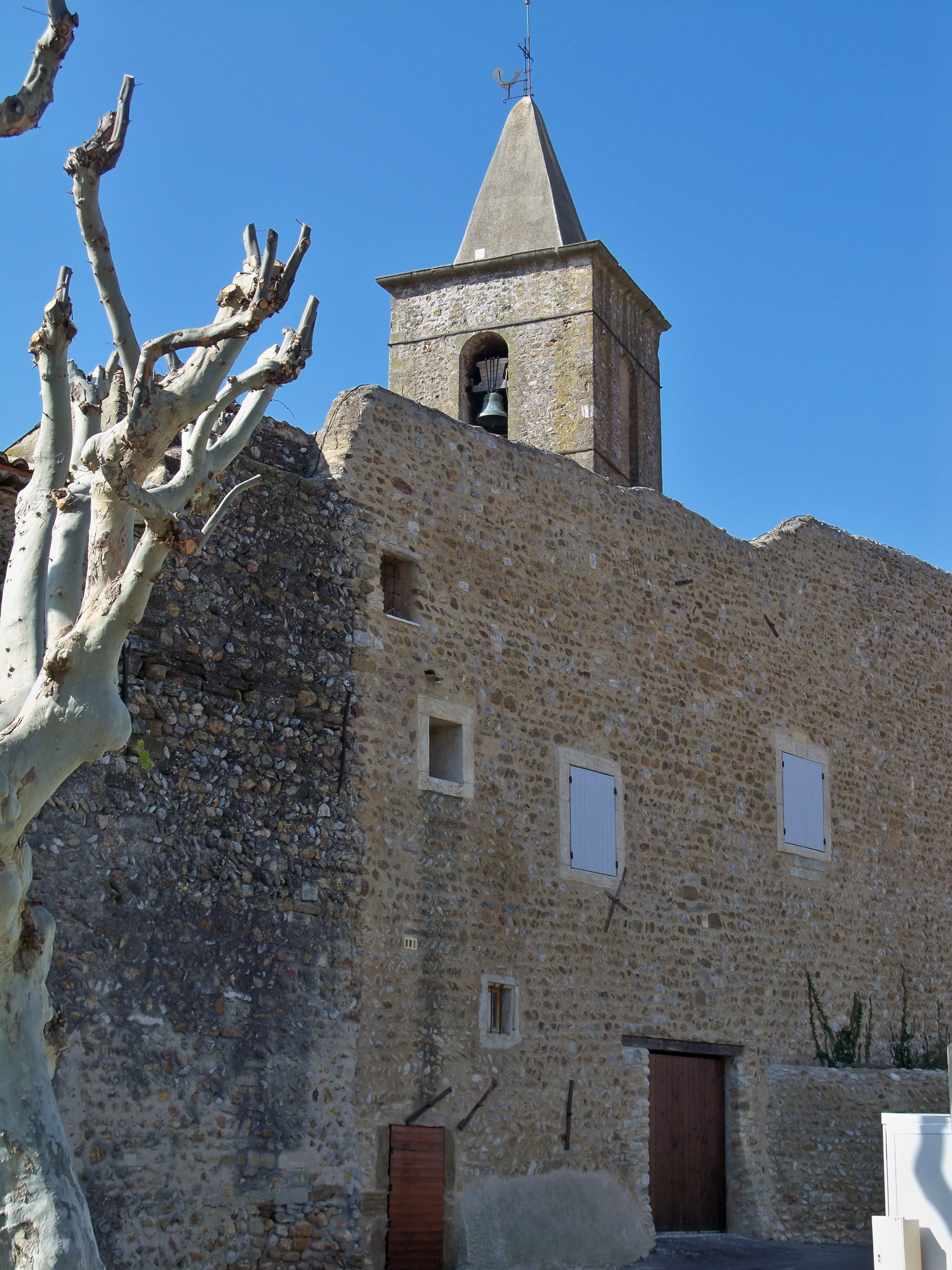
- The rampart with the priory bell tower

- Coat of arms
- Location of Tulette
- Location within France Location within Auvergne-Rhône-Alpes
- Coordinates: 44°17′14″N 4°55′54″E
- Country: France
- Region: Auvergne-Rhône-Alpes
- Department: Drôme
- Arrondissement: Nyons
- Canton: Grignan

Government
  - Mayor (2020–2026): Sylvie Molinié
- Area^{1}: 23.53 km^{2} (9.08 sq mi)
- Elevation: 144 m (472 ft)
- Highest elevation: 222 m (728 ft)
- Lowest elevation: 109 m (358 ft)
- Population (2023): 1,994
  - Density: 84.74/km^{2} (219.5/sq mi)
- Time zone: UTC+01:00 (CET)
  - Summer (DST): UTC+02:00 (CEST)
- INSEE/Postal code: 26357 /26790
- ^{1} French Land Register data, which excludes lakes, ponds, glaciers > 1 km^{2} (0.386 sq mi or 247 acres) and river estuaries.

Tulette (French pronunciation: [tylɛt]; Occitan: Tuleta) is a commune in the Drôme department in southeastern France.

== Population ==
Historical population
Year	Pop.	±% p.a.
1968	1,402	—
1975	1,440	+0.38%
1982	1,507	+0.65%
1990	1,575	+0.55%
1999	1,714	+0.94%
2007	1,877	+1.14%
2012	1,933	+0.59%
2017	1,989	+0.57%
2023	1,994	+0.04%
Source: INSEE

== See also ==
- Communes of the Drôme department
- Cellier des Dauphins
