= Bouchet, Drôme =

Bouchet
- Commune
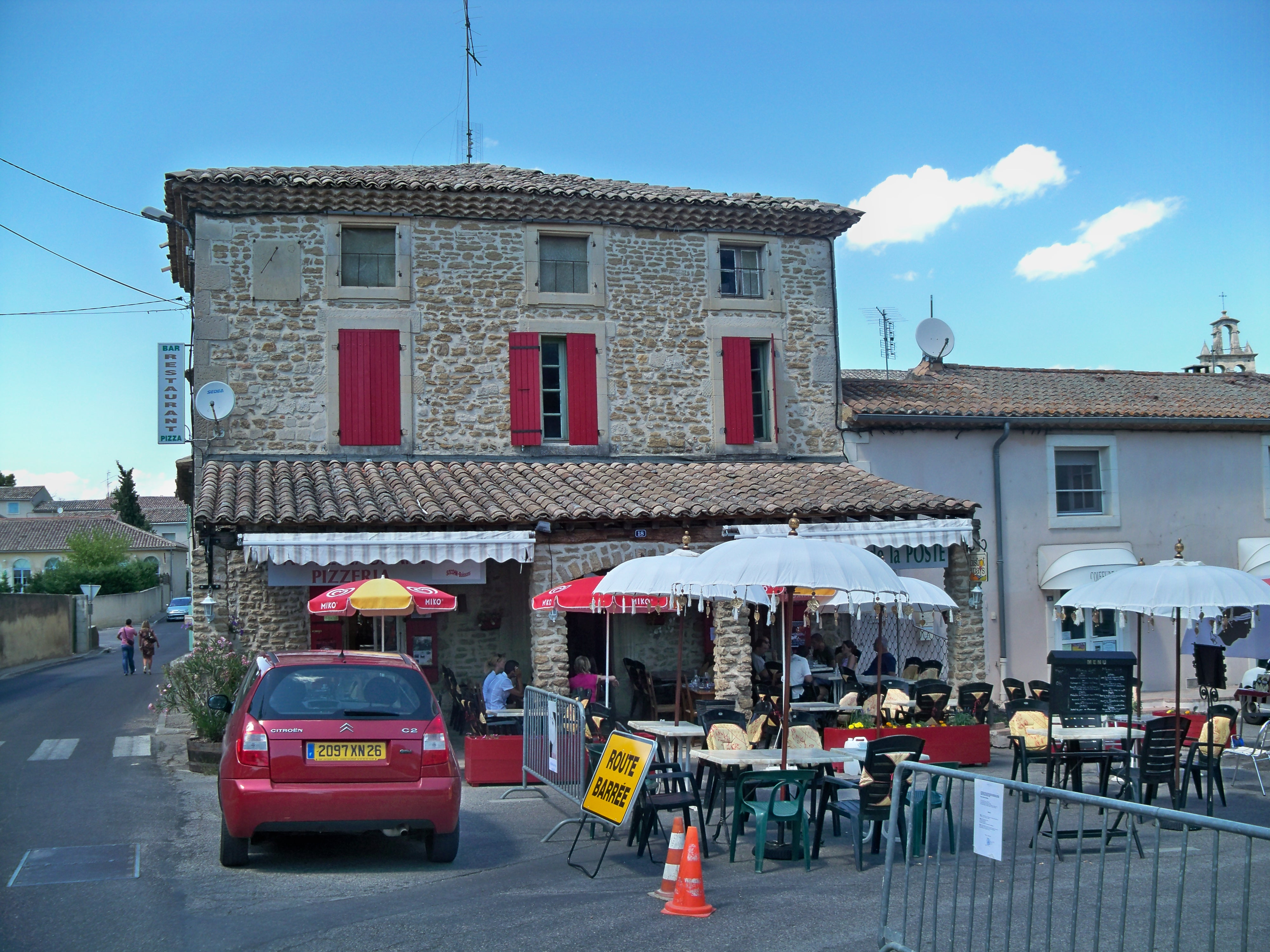
- A restaurant in Bouchet

- Coat of arms
- Location of Bouchet
- Location within France Location within Auvergne-Rhône-Alpes
- Coordinates: 44°18′00″N 4°52′26″E
- Country: France
- Region: Auvergne-Rhône-Alpes
- Department: Drôme
- Arrondissement: Nyons
- Canton: Grignan

Government
  - Mayor (2020–2026): Jean-Michel Avias
- Area^{1}: 11.89 km^{2} (4.59 sq mi)
- Highest elevation: 135 m (443 ft)
- Lowest elevation: 85 m (279 ft)
- Population (2023): 1,409
  - Density: 118.5/km^{2} (306.9/sq mi)
- Time zone: UTC+01:00 (CET)
  - Summer (DST): UTC+02:00 (CEST)
- INSEE/Postal code: 26054 /26790
- ^{1} French Land Register data, which excludes lakes, ponds, glaciers > 1 km^{2} (0.386 sq mi or 247 acres) and river estuaries.

Bouchet (French pronunciation: [buˈʃɛ]; Occitan: Boschet) is a commune in the Drôme department in southeastern France.

== Population ==
Historical population
Year	Pop.	±% p.a.
1968	559	—
1975	571	+0.30%
1982	671	+2.33%
1990	670	−0.02%
1999	694	+0.39%
2007	1,021	+4.94%
2012	1,305	+5.03%
2017	1,512	+2.99%
2023	1,409	−1.17%
Source: INSEE

== See also ==
- Communes of the Drôme department
