= County of Provence =

Historical French state (855–1487)

County of Provence Comtat de Provença
- Coat of arms

- What remained of the County of Provence in 1789 before its disappearance in 1790
- Status: County, fief of: Kingdom of Arles (947–1032); Holy Roman Empire (1032–1481); Kingdom of France (1481)
- Capital: Aix
- Other languages: Latin, Old Occitan, Occitan (expressed in the sub-dialects of the Provençal and Alpine groups), French (administration), Ligurian (some municipalities)
- Demonym: Provençal

Establishment
  - Boson II, Count of Arles: 947
  - Division between the county and marquisate of Provence: 1125
  - Passage at the Maison d'Anjou: 1246
  - Surrender of Nice to Savoy: 1388
  - Bequest to Louis XI of France: 1481
  - Perpetual union with the Kingdom of France: 1487
  - Dissolution of the provincial institutions: 1790

The County of Provence (Occitan: Comtat de Provença) was a largely autonomous medieval state that eventually became incorporated into the Kingdom of France in 1481. For four centuries Provence was ruled by a series of counts that were vassals of the Carolingian Empire, Burgundy and finally the Holy Roman Empire, but in practice they were largely independent.

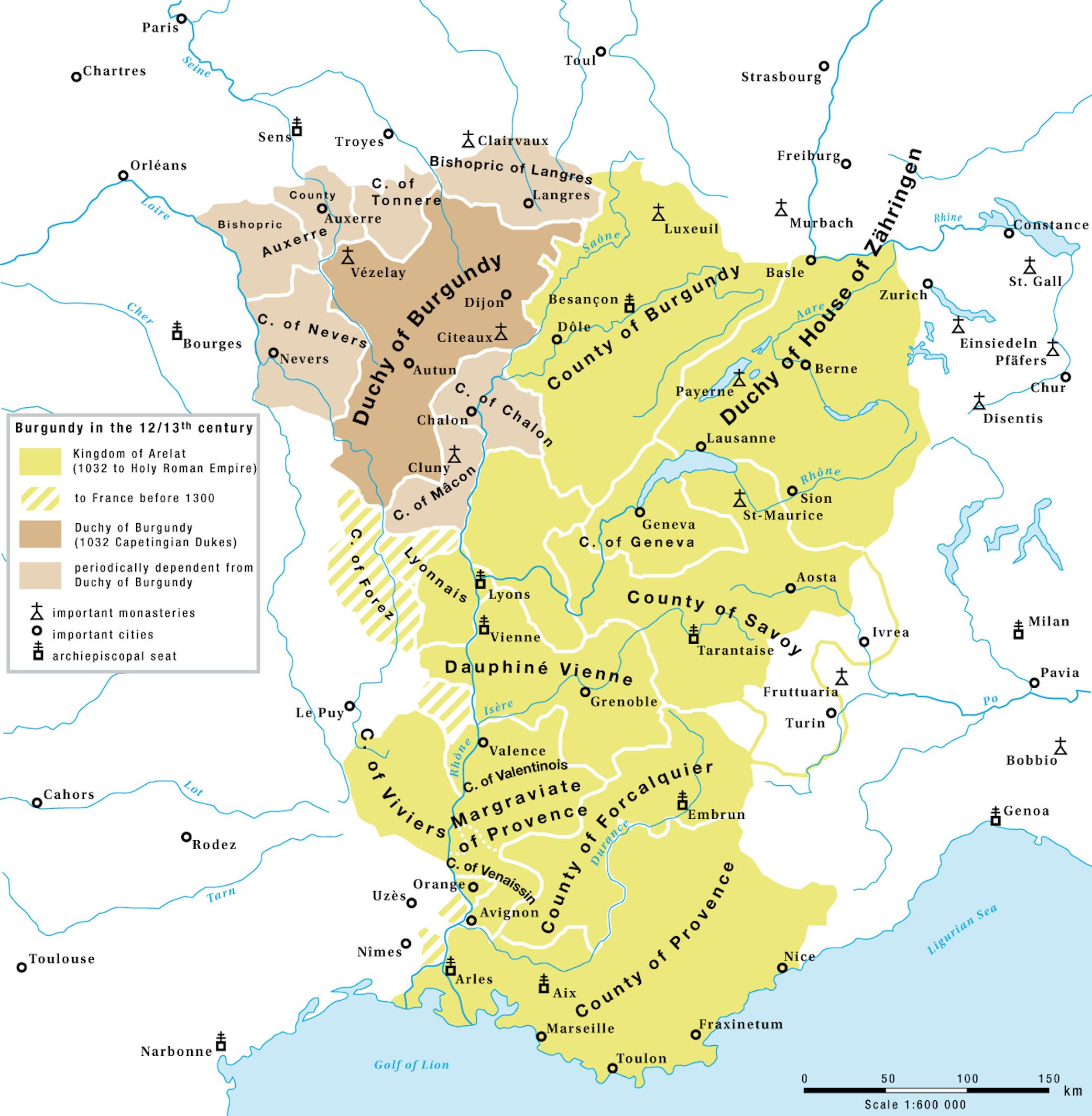
Map showing the march and county Provence and the county of Forcalquier as parts of the Kingdom of Burgundy-Arles in the 12th and 13th centuries.

== Overview ==
The County of Provence (in Old Occitan, Comtat de Provensa) was a former fief east of the Rhône delta. A territory that emerged from Middle Francia, Provence was first organized as a kingdom before gradually disintegrating due to feudal transfers and the civil war of the Union of Aix. Its natural borders originally stretched south from the Rhône to Nice and north from Embrun to the Vivarais, passing through the Drôme provençale. To the north, its boundaries extended as far as Valence.

The county was annexed to France in 1487, and the king assumed the title "Count of Provence, Forcalquier, and adjacent lands," while appointing Palamède de Forbin as Grand Seneschal, Governor, and Lieutenant General of Provence. Provence retained its privileges, franchises, and freedoms.

In terms of taxation, Provence was a pays de taille réelle (a land-tax-paying region); the don gratuit, the principal direct tax, was levied on property, except “noble property.” Regarding the salt tax (gabelle), Provence was a pays de petite gabelle (small salt-tax region); salt was sold through five salt warehouses (in Berre, Toulon, Hyères, Fréjus, and Cannes), along with additional storage depots.

The political structure of the County was reformed into departments in 1790, with legislative institutions transferred to the new capital, Paris. These events triggered federalist movements, which were repressed by the Convention's centralist armies. During this time, Toulon and Marseille were renamed Port-la-Montagne and La Ville-sans-nom (“The City Without a Name”), respectively.

== Toponymy ==
The term “County of Provence” is attested as early as 1059. (Note: The first occurrence of the term County of Provence is found in a charter from the cartulary of the Abbey of Saint-Victor of Marseille.) It derives from the title “Count of Provence,” which had been recorded since 972 (Note: The first occurrence of the title Count of Provence is found in a charter from the cartulary of the Abbey of Saint-Victor of Marseille.) and became more commonly used from the 1020s–1030s onward.

Provence owes its name to Roman times: it was the first region of Transalpine Gaul conquered between 58 and 51 BCE, and it became part of the Roman province (Provincia in Latin), with Narbonne as its capital—thus the name Gallia Narbonensis. The Latin Provincia gave rise to the Provençal form Proensa, which evolved into Provensa, then Prouvença (in Simon-Jude Honnorat's Provençal dictionary), and eventually Prouvenço under French influence in Provençal orthography. The spelling Prouvènço was standardized by followers of Roumanille and the phonetic writing system known as mistralian or “modern.” Classicists later proposed returning to a more original form, Provensa, which appeared on several early 20th-century maps. However, the medieval form Provença was chosen, as it included the letter ç representing the etymological c of provincia. In The Gallic Wars, Caesar mentions passing from Provincia to Narbonnensis when crossing the Rhône, which likely explains why only the part of former Narbonese Gaul east of the Rhône came to be known as Provence.

== Geography ==
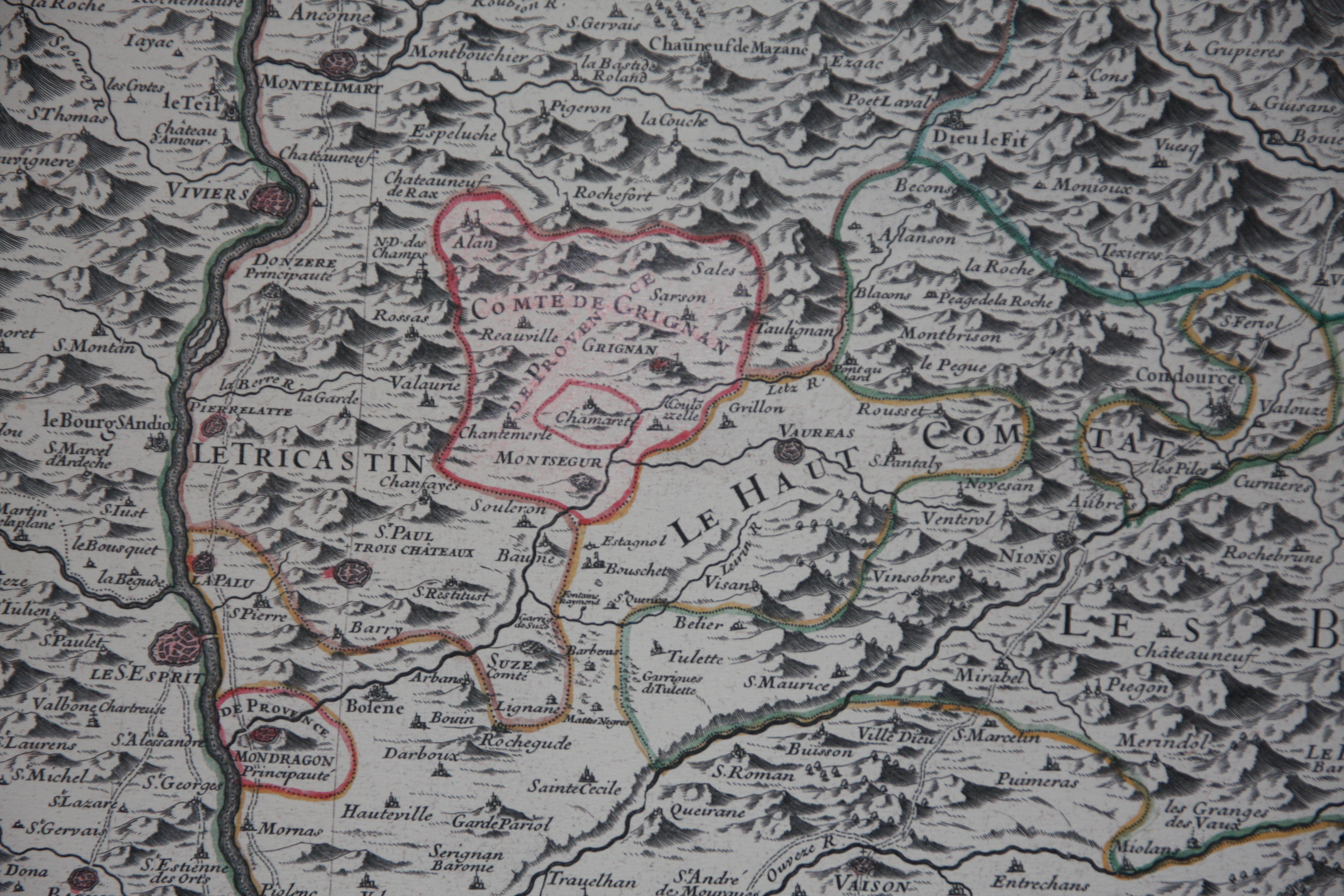
The main Provençal enclave to the north, in the Dauphiné, adjoining the Comtat Venaissin: the county of Grignan de Provence (map of the surrounding area from 1700)

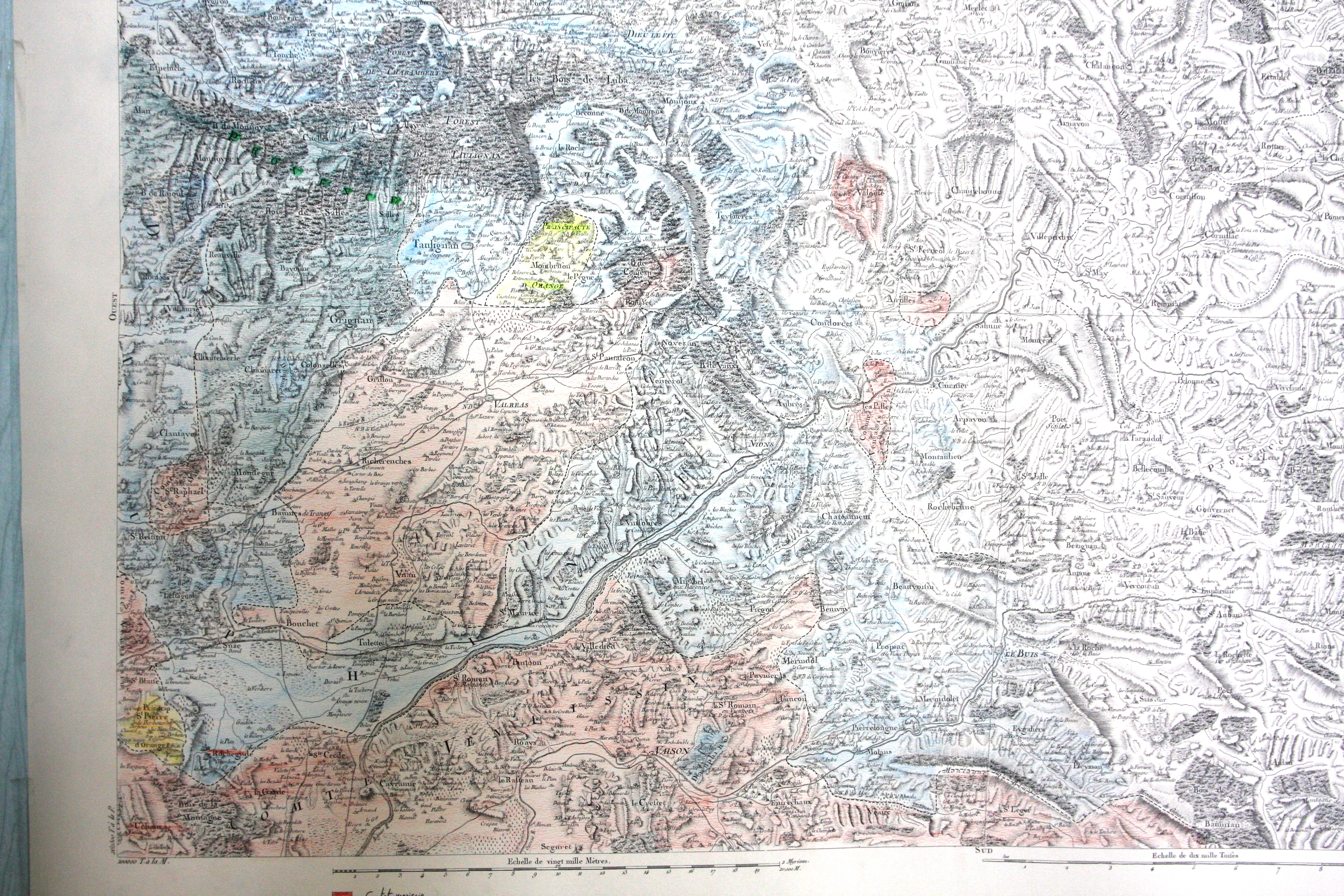
Enlargement of the Cassini map section 121 (Vaison) showing, in green, the enclaves of Provence in Dauphiné (circa 1750).

=== Borders ===
Historically, after the fall of the Roman Empire, “Provence” referred to the territory incorporated into the Frankish Kingdom in 536 and which became the Marquisate of Provence under the Kingdom of Burgundy-Provence in 947. It later became the County of Provence, with Arles, then Aix-en-Provence as its capitals (Arles suffering frequent attacks from the Count of Toulouse, Marquis of Provence). The borders fluctuated: in 1125, a treaty between Raymond Berenger and Alphonse Jourdain of Toulouse divided Provence. The County of Provence was tied to the Crown of Aragon until the Treaty of Meaux-Paris (1229). In 1388, after Queen Joanna's death, her territories east of the Var were lost and ceded to the States of Savoy in what became known as the Dédition de Nice, initially forming the Terres Neuves de Provence and later the County of Nice from 1526. A century later, in 1481, the County of Provence passed by succession to King Louis XI of France and thus became a French province.

In the Middle Ages, Provence included the southern Alps up to the left-bank tributaries of the Var. Parts of the Alpine regions were later separated: in the north, incorporated into the Dauphiné province, and in the east, the Pays Niçois (Note: The County of Nice belongs to Provence, not only as an administrative entity but also geographically and historically, since it was part of Provence when the region was incorporated in 536 into the Frankish Kingdom, and it remained so until 1388.) (County of Nice) was granted to the House of Savoy in 1388 under the name Terres Neuves de Provence. This Savoyard acquisition, at Provence's expense, led to the creation of the County of Nice from 1526 to 1860.

During the French Revolution, Provence was divided into three departments: Basses-Alpes (renamed Alpes-de-Haute-Provence in 1970), Bouches-du-Rhône, and Var. The department of Vaucluse was created in 1793 from Avignon, the Comtat Venaissin, and the northern part of Bouches-du-Rhône. The Alpes-Maritimes were created in 1860 from the County of Nice and the eastern part of Var (Grasse district).

The southern part of Drôme, though historically part of the Dauphiné, is known as Drôme provençale. It is culturally close to Provence due to language, the fact that the bishopric of Saint-Paul-Trois-Châteaux belonged to the metropolitan province of Provence (Archbishopric of Arles), the region of Bouchet was part of the Comtat Venaissin (Upper Comtat), and because Diois and Valentinois were vassals of the Marquis of Provence.

Over time, some authentically Provençal enclaves persisted in southern Drôme provençale, such as the County of Grignan (including the neighboring villages of Réauville, Montjoyer, Salles, Colonzelle, Allan), the Provençal enclave of Lemps (written Lens in the 18th century), and the enclaves of Saint-May, Rémuzat, Cornillon, Pommerol, and Eygalayes. All these villages identify with Provence and have legitimate historical claims to that heritage.

The province of Provence within its 18th century boundaries and the current municipalities and departments.

=== Relief ===
The relief of Provence is generally hilly, with impressive Prealps in the central part and, to the east and northeast, the Southern Alps, which reach their highest point at 3,412 meters at the Aiguille de Chambeyron (Alpes-de-Haute-Provence). Further south lies the Pelat Massif, rising to 3,050 meters. On either side of the Var River, as well as east of the Verdon River, the Castellane Prealps, which peak at Puy de Rent at 1,996 meters, are composed of plateaus and mountain ranges oriented west to east. The High Provence Plains (Plans de Haute-Provence) separate the Prealps from the central hills (Valensole Plateau, Canjuers Plain, Albion Plateau). To the west, the Mont Ventoux massif, mostly located in the Comtat Venaissin, extends into Provence, where it reaches an altitude of 1,600 meters in the Sault National Forest. The Sainte-Victoire Mountain, famous for Cézanne's paintings, dominates the Aix region (Pays d’Aix). In the Bouches-du-Rhône department, the Alpilles are notable, while in Vaucluse, at the edge of the Comtat Venaissin, stands the Petit Luberon, Provençal in its eastern part, followed by the Grand Luberon, which reaches its highest point at Mourre Nègre. Lastly, the Sainte-Baume massif stretches from west to east, from Gémenos (Bouches-du-Rhône) to Mazaugues (Var).

The coastlines from Marseille to Menton are rather rugged (Calanques, Maures, Esterel, French Riviera). Erosion caused by violent summer storms can create deeply carved ravines.

The western part of the region is marked by the Crau Plain and the Camargue, formed by the Rhône Delta, which are the only truly flat areas in the Provençal region.

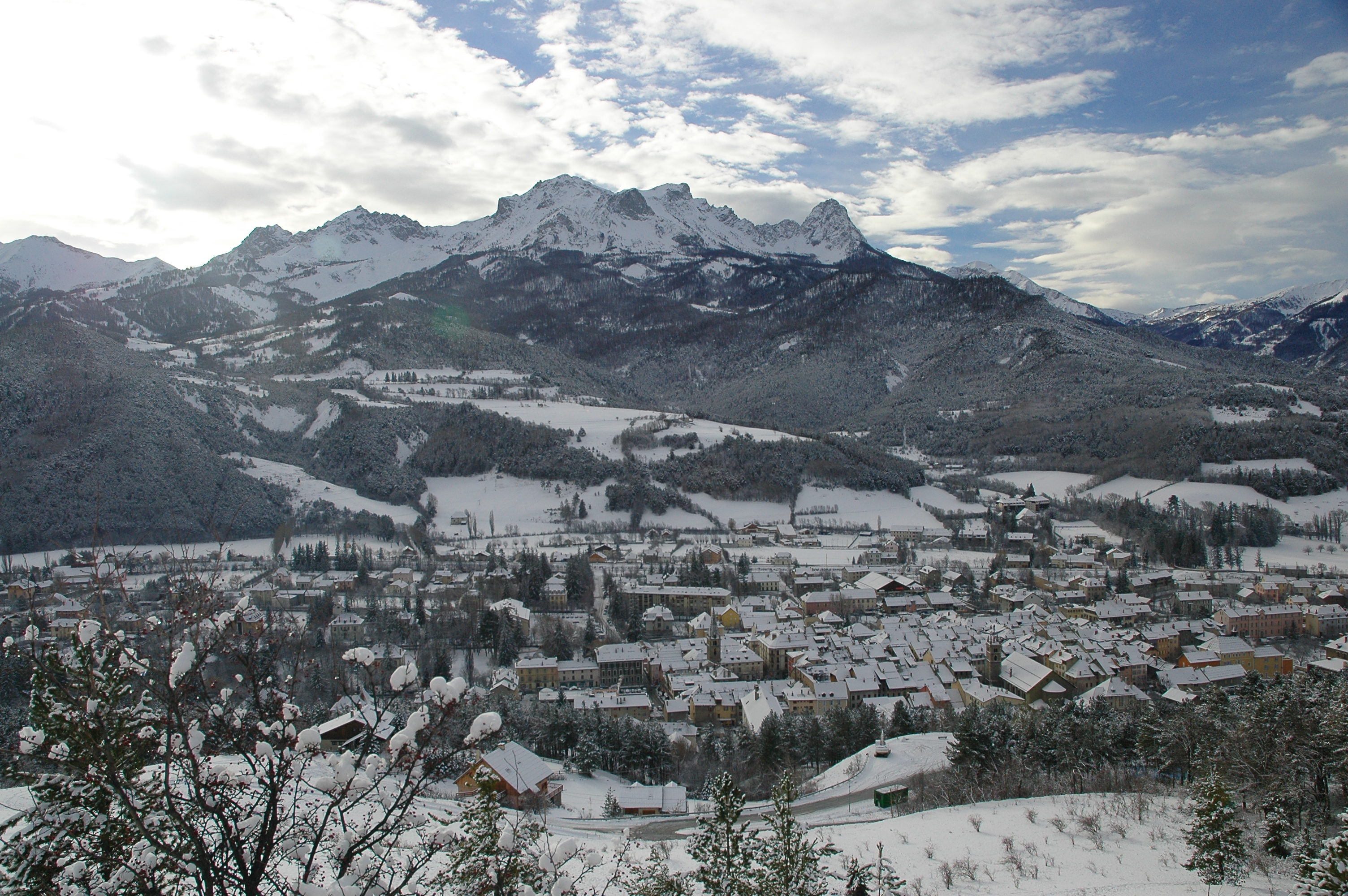
Barcelonnette

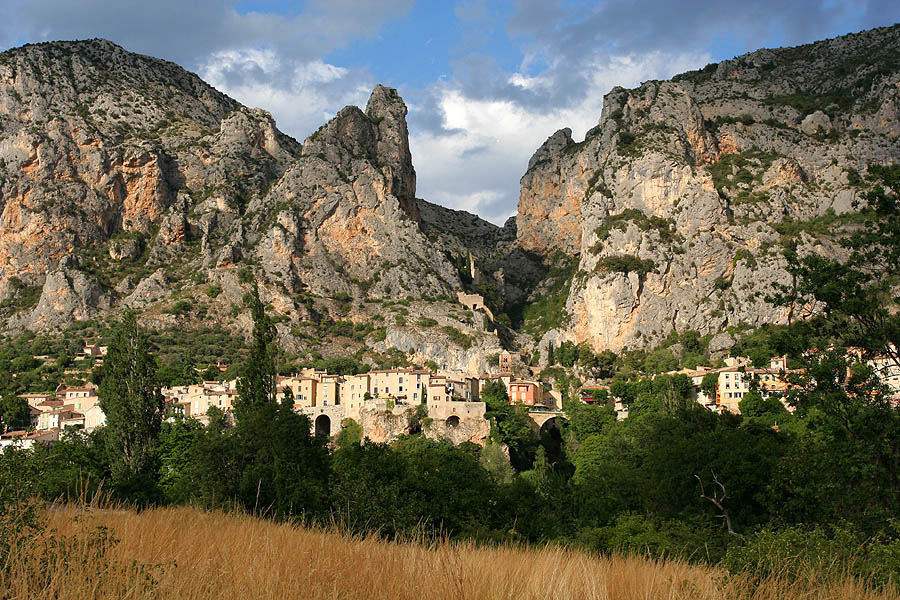
Moustiers-Sainte-Marie, in the Alpes-de-Haute-Provence

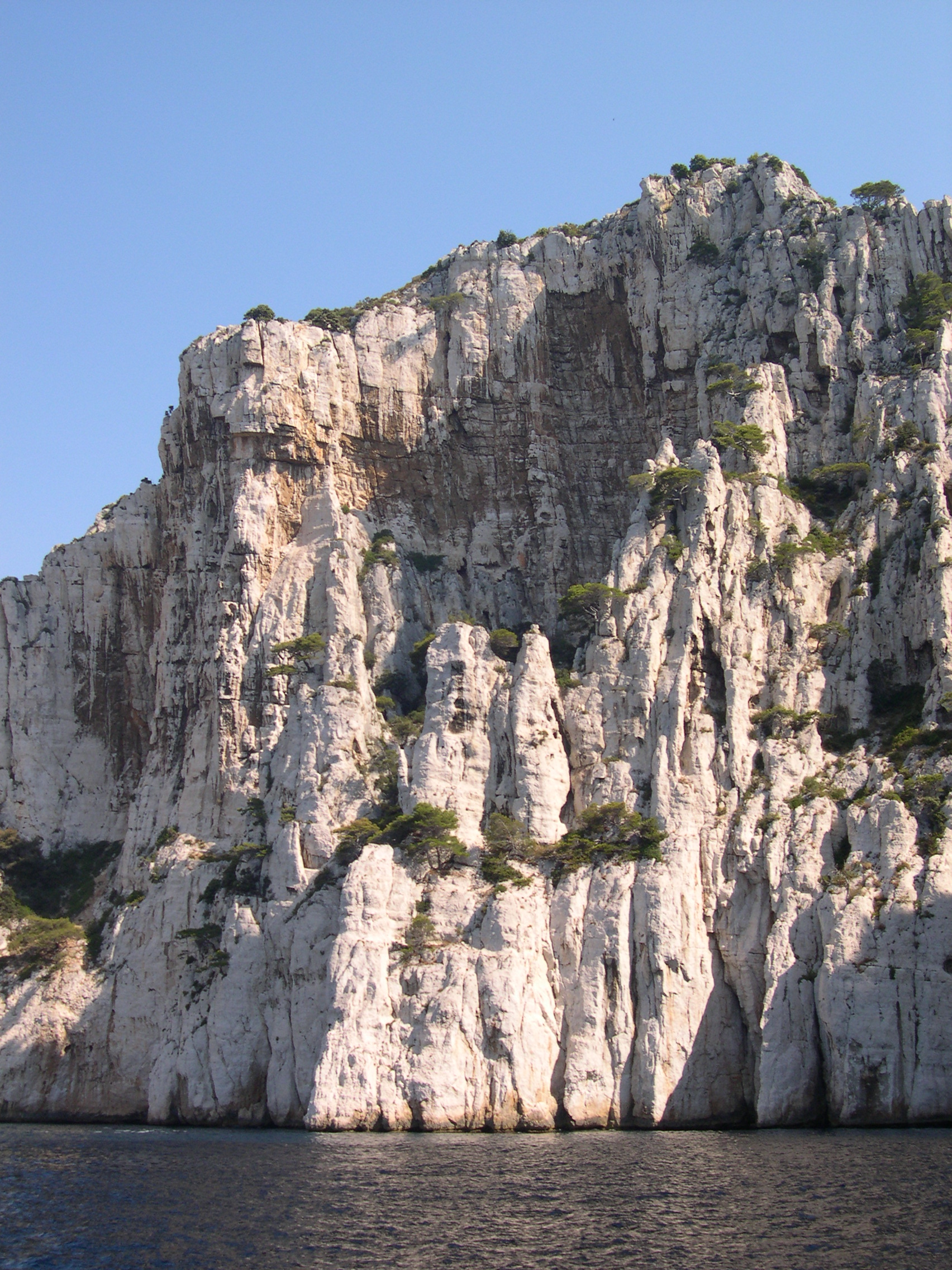
Calanque de l'Oule in Marseille

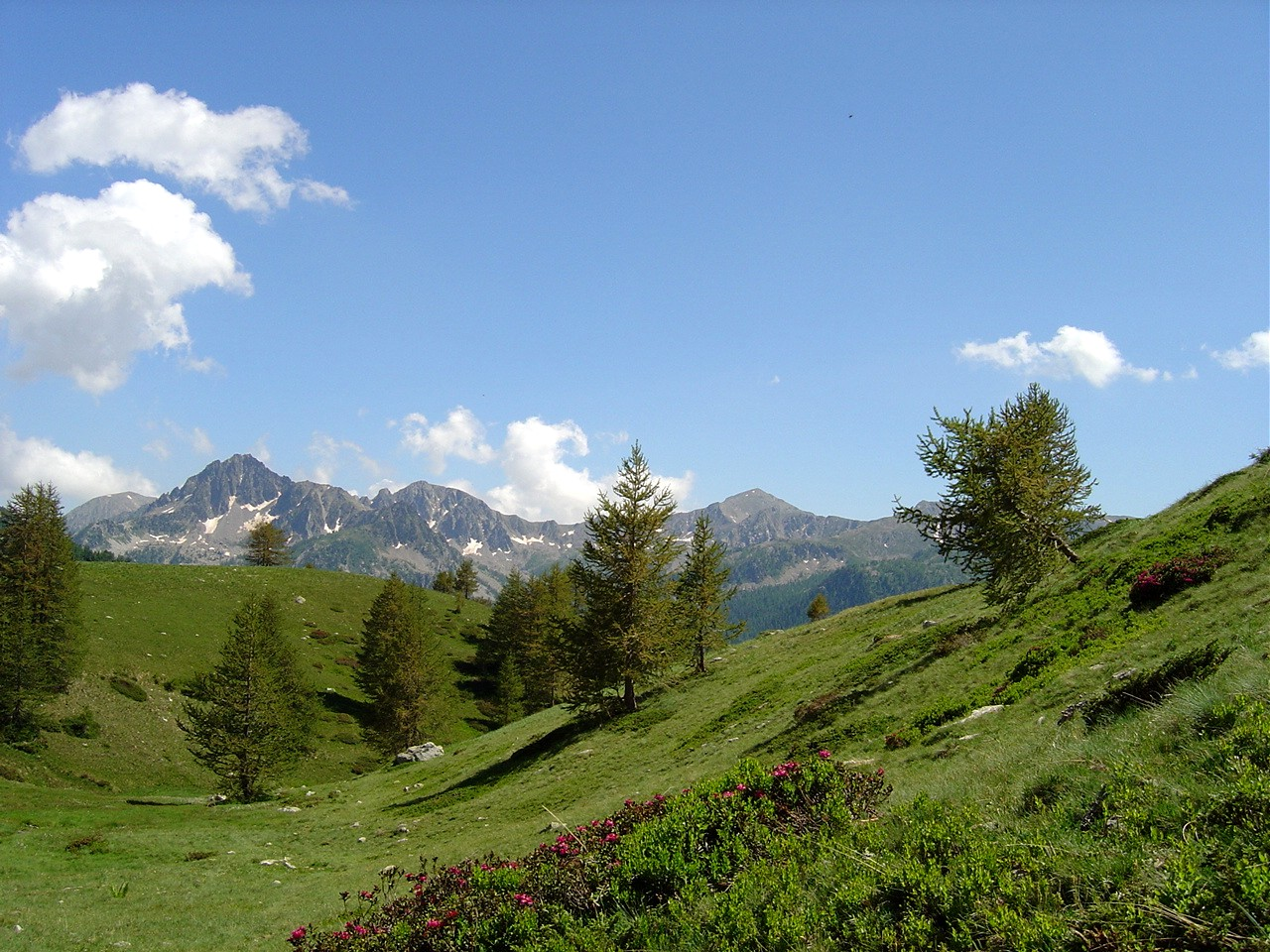
Vallon de Mollières, Mercantour National Park in the Alpes-Maritimes

=== Hydrography ===
Among the waterways that cross Provence, the most significant is the Rhône, which forms the western border of the region. The Rhône has the second-largest flow rate of all rivers flowing into the Mediterranean Sea, after the Nile. As it flows into a tide-less sea, the river has formed a delta. Now embanked, this delta remains stable except during exceptional floods such as those in 1993, 1994, and 2003.

The Durance is a tributary of the Rhône, with its source at approximately 2,390 meters above sea level, at the Pré de Gondran, on the slopes of the Sommet des Anges. The source lies near the former Gondran Fort, in the commune of Montgenèvre, in the Hautes-Alpes, near the Italian border. It flows into the Rhône a few kilometers southwest of Avignon, between the Vaucluse and Bouches-du-Rhône departments, serving as a border between the two. The Durance is known as a “capricious” river, once feared for both its floods (Provençal tradition says the three plagues of Provence were the mistral wind, the Durance, and the Parliament of Aix) and its low-water periods.

The Ubaye is a river that originates at the Col du Longet at an altitude of 2,655 meters, in the Ubaye Valley. It passes through Barcelonnette (a sub-prefecture of Alpes-de-Haute-Provence) and feeds into the Durance in the Serre-Ponçon hydroelectric reservoir.

The Verdon River, which rises at the foot of the Tête de la Sestrière (altitude 2,572 meters), flows into the Durance after covering approximately 175 kilometers. It is especially renowned for its gorges.

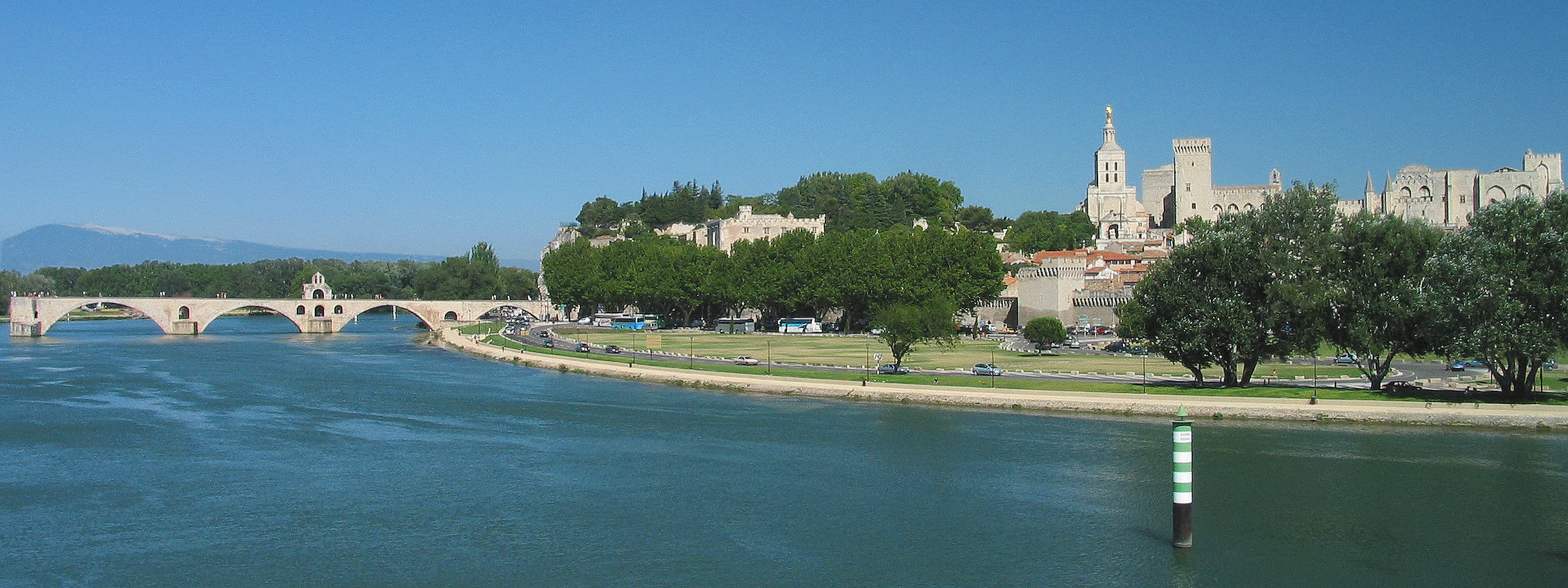
The Rhône at Avignon.

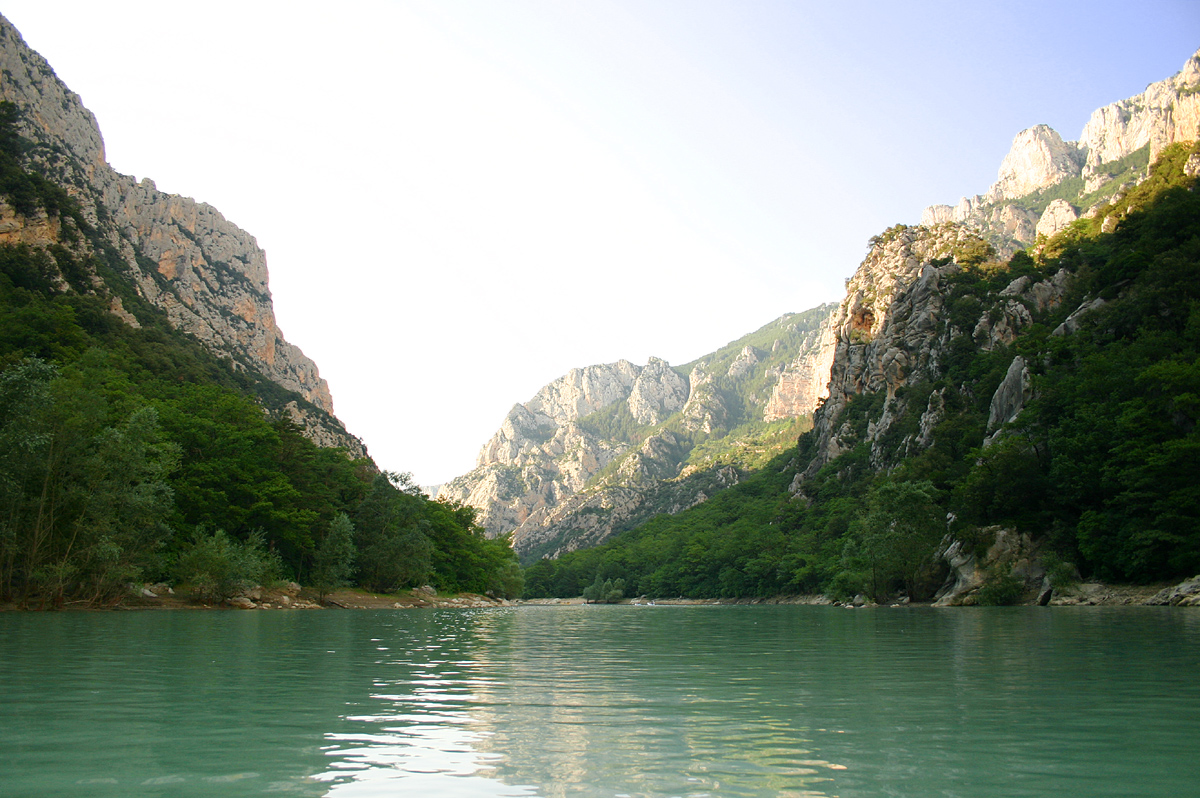
The Verdon Gorge.

Many coastal rivers also exist in Provence, notably:

- The Var River, which originates at an altitude of 1,790 meters, south of the Cayolle Pass, and travels 114 kilometers through Alpes-Maritimes (it no longer crosses the department that bears its name) before reaching the Mediterranean Sea between Nice and Saint-Laurent-du-Var. The Var River, whose flow is usually low (typically 50 to 100 m³/s), is considered the natural border between Provence and the County of Nice.
- The Argens River crosses the Var department from Seillons Source d’Argens to Fréjus, where it flows into the Mediterranean.

=== Climate ===
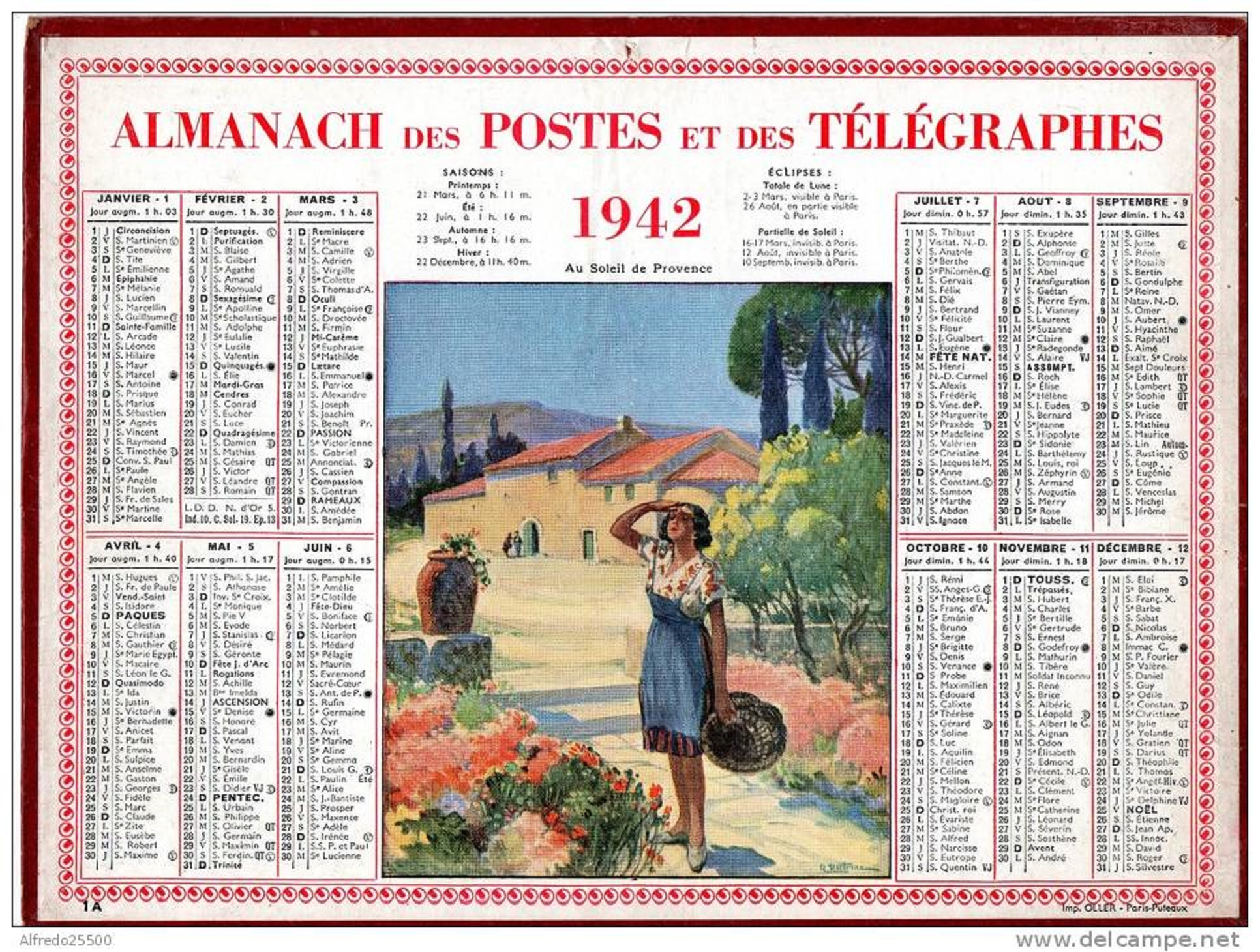
Au Soleil de Provence

Provence is a region with a Mediterranean climate, featuring hot, dry summers. Winters are mild along the coast and generally humid in the east but are harsher in the north and northeast (Pelat, Ubaye, Digne Prealps), where the climate becomes alpine.

In its central and Mediterranean areas, the vegetation of Provence is characteristic of the garrigue (scrubland), and the summer drought makes it particularly vulnerable to wildfires. However, the region becomes greener and more humid in its more easterly and alpine parts.

The main wind is the mistral, whose speed can exceed 110 km/h. It blows between 120 and 160 days per year, with gusts averaging 90 km/h. The following table (not included here) indicates the various mistral wind speeds recorded at the Orange and Carpentras-Serres stations in the southern Rhône Valley and its frequency during the year 2006. The "normal" corresponds to the average of the past 53 years for Orange's meteorological records and 42 years for those of Carpentras.

Wind speed of the Mistral (“=” means equal to normal; “+” means above normal; “-” means below normal)
	Jan.	Feb.	March	April	May	June	July	August	Sept.	Oct.	Nov.	Dec.
Maximum speed recorded during the month	96 km/h	97 km/h	112 km/h	97 km/h	94 km/h	100 km/h	90 km/h	90 km/h	90 km/h	87 km/h	91 km/h	118 km/h
Trend: days with a speed > 16 m/s (58 km/h)	--	+++	---	++++	++++	=	=	++++	+	---	=	++

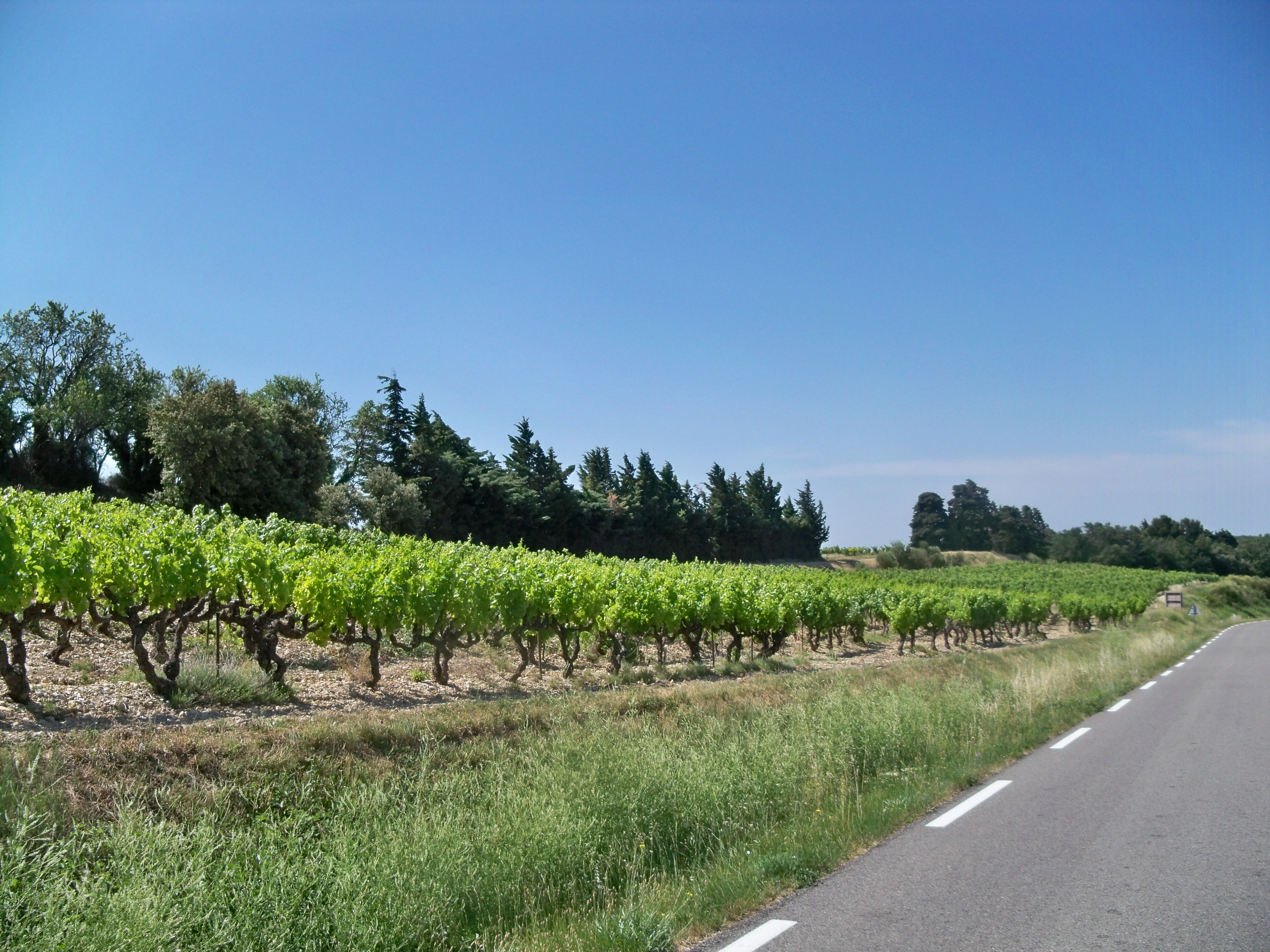
Rhône Valley: cypress hedges against the mistral

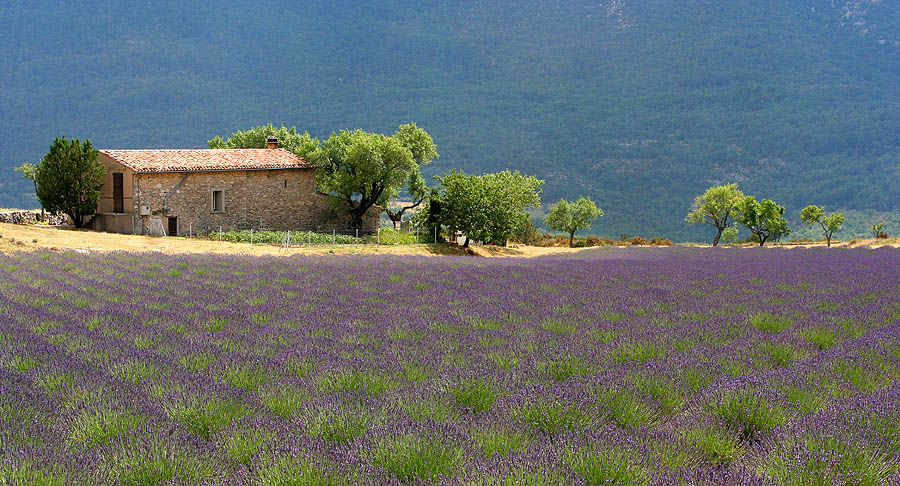
Typical Provençal landscape, a field of lavender

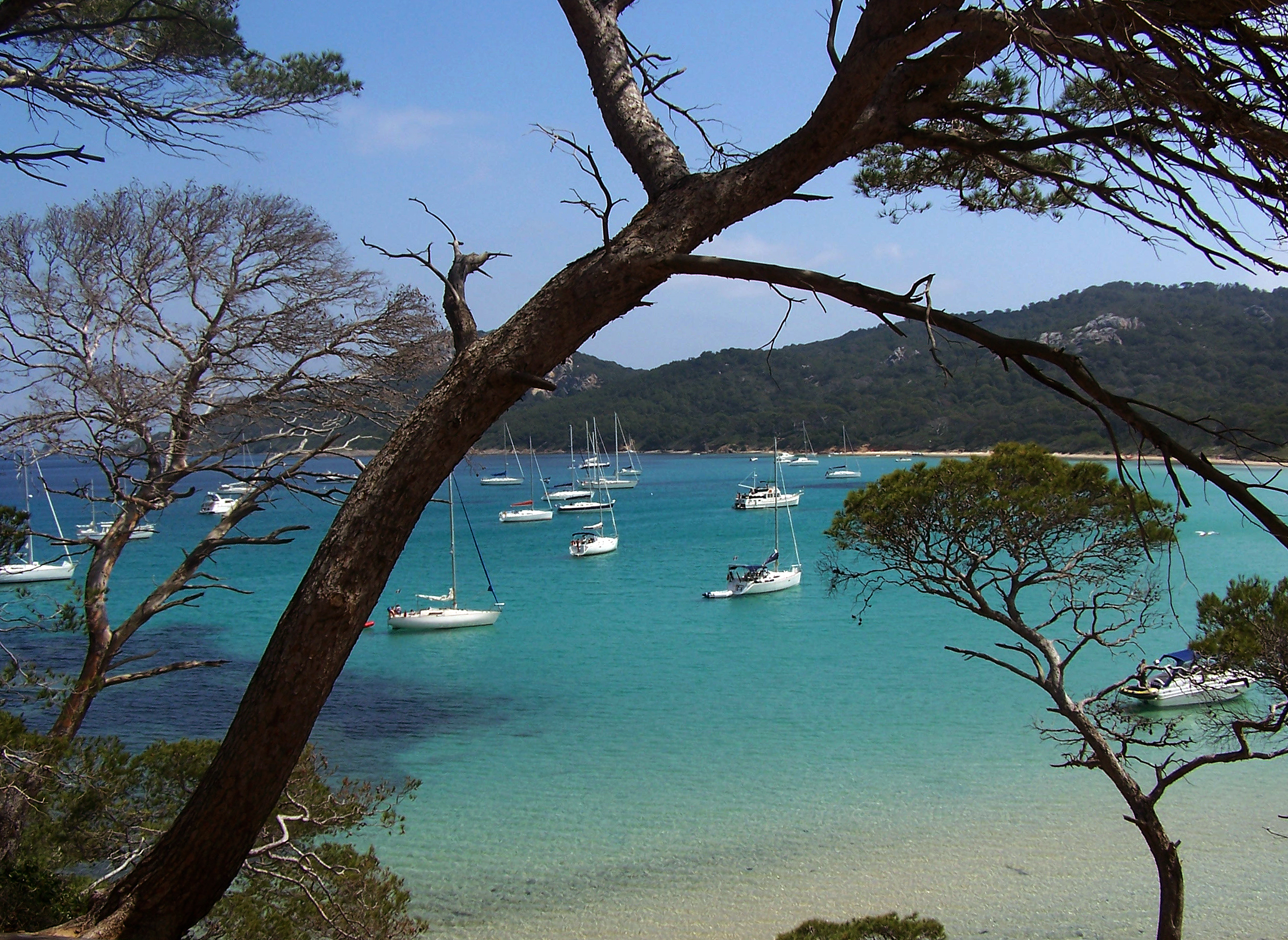
La Courtade beach, on the island of Porquerolles

== History ==
=== Antiquity ===
==== Greek provence ====
The Provençal coastline was colonized by the Greeks: around 600 BCE, the Phocaeans settled in Marseille (Massalia in Greek; Massilia in Latin). They spread out to other areas, founding colonies in Nice (Nikaia), Antibes (Antipolis), Hyères (Olbia), Six-Fours (Tauroeis), Arles, La Ciotat (Citharista), Brégançon (Pergantion), Monaco (Monoïkos), Athénopolis, and on certain parts of the Languedoc coast such as Agde (Agathé) and south of Nîmes. To the north, they founded Le Pègue near Valréas and stopped at La Laupie, east of Montélimar. Before the Roman invasion and colonization, the region was mainly inhabited by Ligurians, who later mixed with some Celtic soldiers and founded what is now referred to as the Celto-Ligurians (formerly Celto-Lygians).

==== The Roman conquest in the 2nd century BCE ====
Brief timeline

- 181 BCE: The Phocaean Massaliotes of the city of Marseille and their Helleno-Celtic allies, the Cavares from the Cavaillon–Avignon–Orange region, called on Rome for help against Ligurian pirates.
- 154 BCE: Nice and Antibes were besieged by Ligurians from the Maritime Alps; a Roman expedition led by Opimius.
- 125/124 BCE: A coalition of Celto-Ligurian tribes (the Salyens), supported by the Vocontii, Allobroges, and Arverni, was defeated by Consul Marcus Fulvius Flaccus, who crossed the Alps.
- 123 BCE: A new campaign ends with the destruction of the oppidum of Entremont.
- 123/122 BCE: Foundation of Aix-en-Provence to control the Salyens.
- 122 BCE: Proconsul Domitius Ahenobarbus crushes the Allobroges.
- 121 BCE: The Volcae, ruling a vast territory of 24 oppida, welcomed the Roman legions without resistance.
- 120 BCE: Ahenobarbus continued his campaign and is credited with the foundation and organization of the Provincia (Province).
- 117 BCE: Beginning of the construction of the Via Domitia (in honor of Cn. Domitius Ahenobarbus) toward the Pyrenees. It followed the route of an ancient Greek road (the Heraclean Way). Its construction symbolized Romanization and stimulated commercial exchange.
- 109–105 BCE: Incursions by Germanic tribes (Cimbri, Teutons, Tigurini, Ambrones). Marius defeated the Teutons at Pourrières (near Aix-en-Provence) in 102 BCE and the Cimbri at Vercellae in 101 BCE.
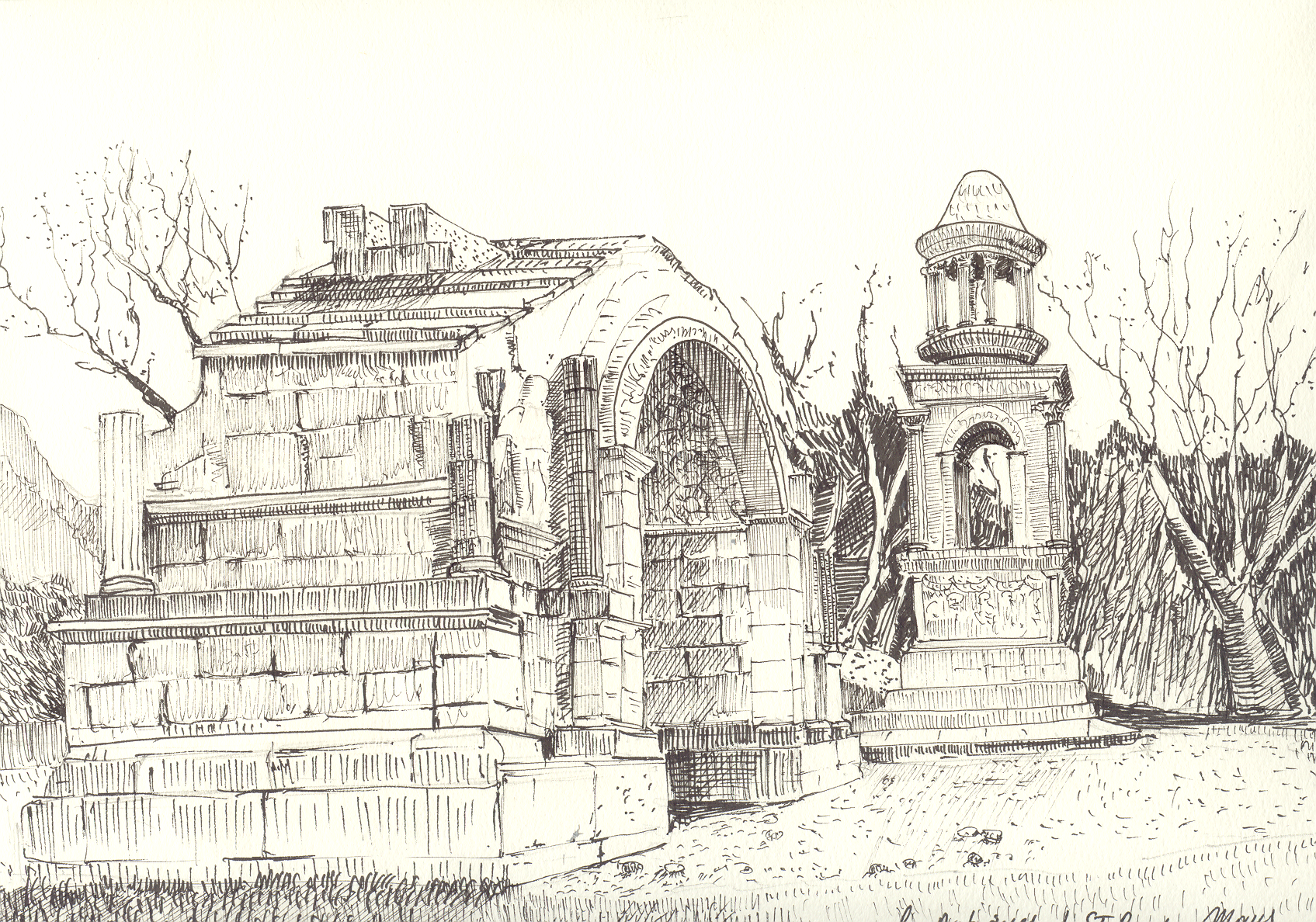
The Antiques in Saint-Rémy-de-Provence

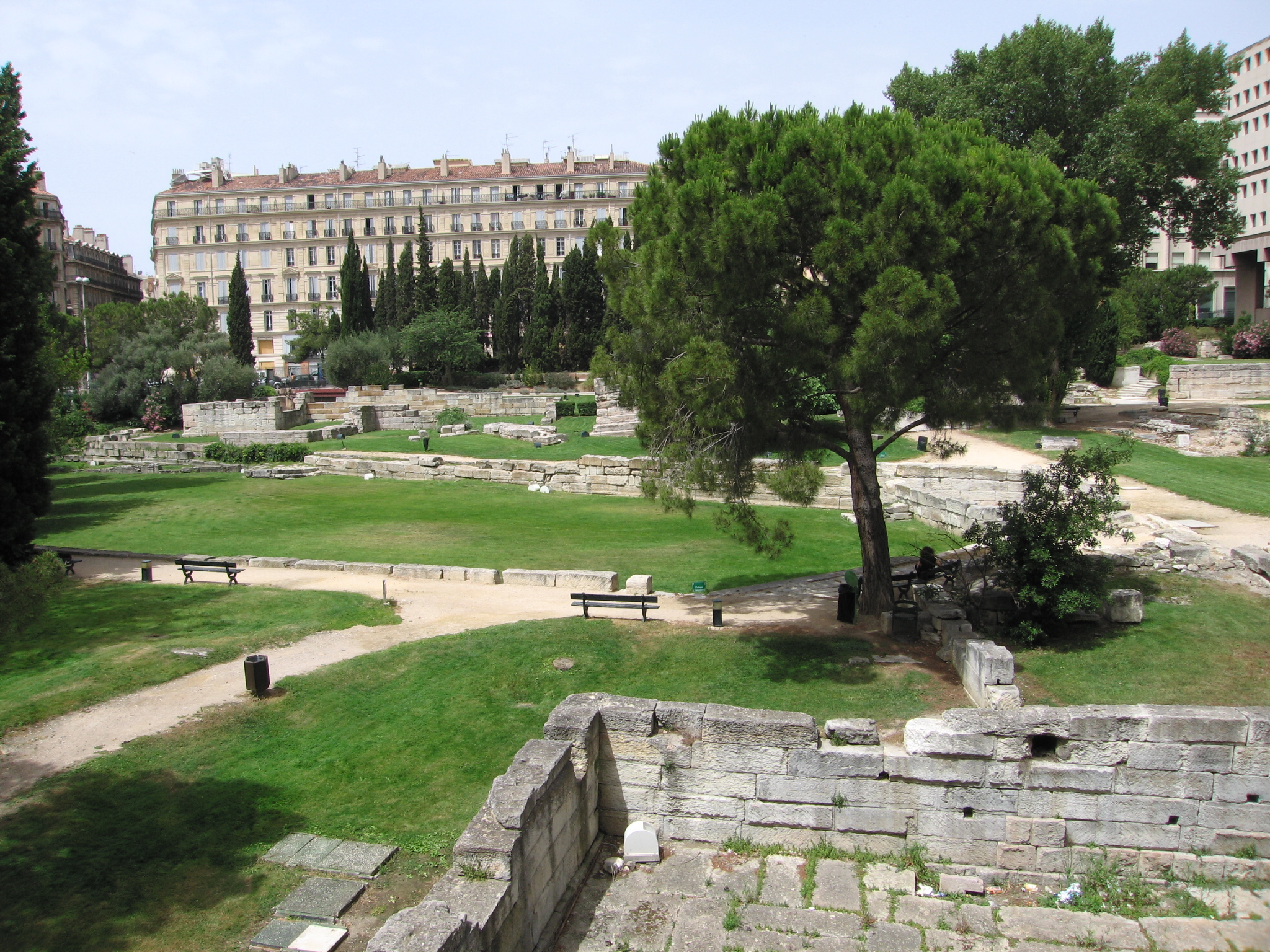
The Jardin des Vestiges in Marseille

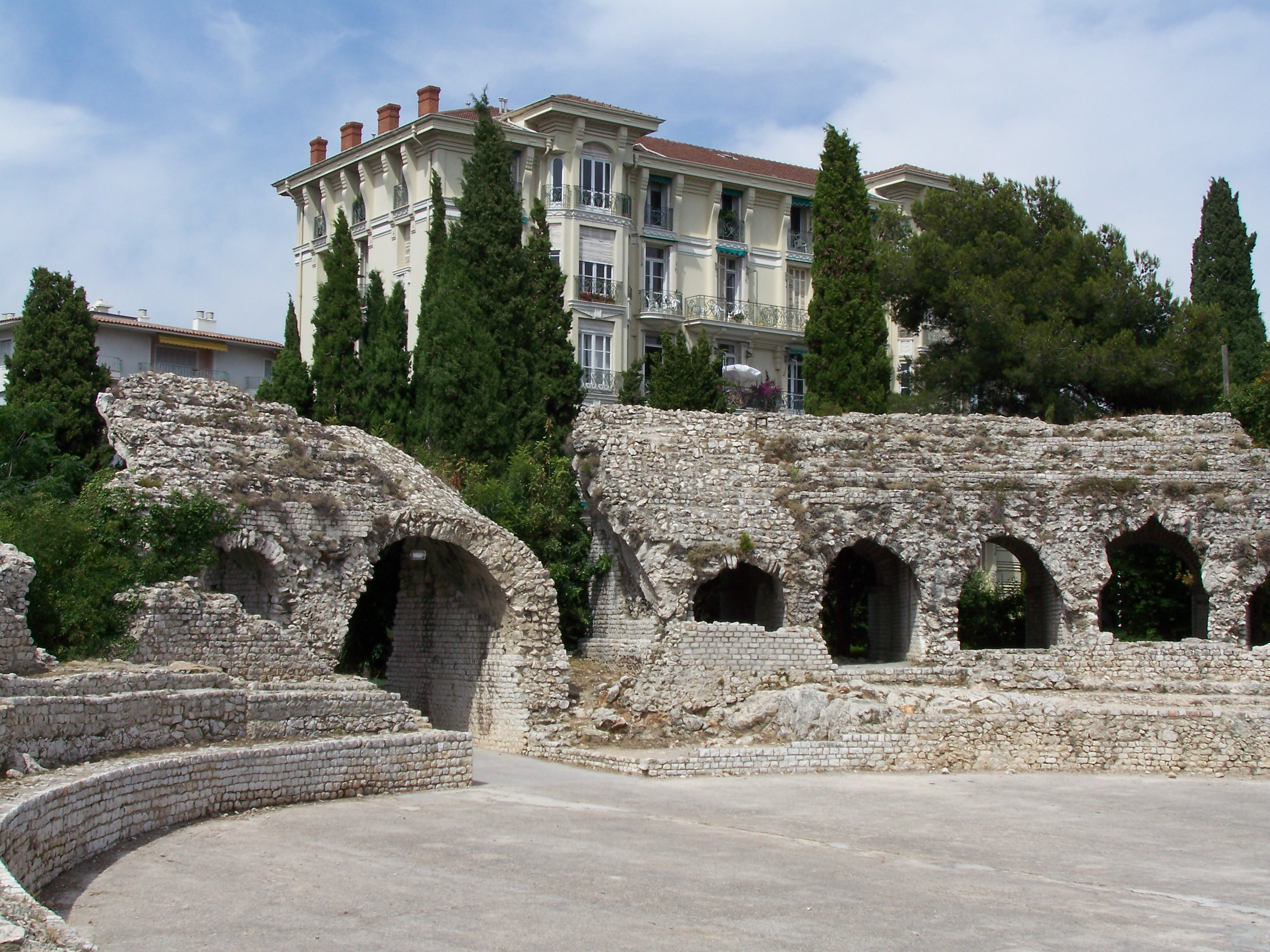
The Cimiez Arena in Nice

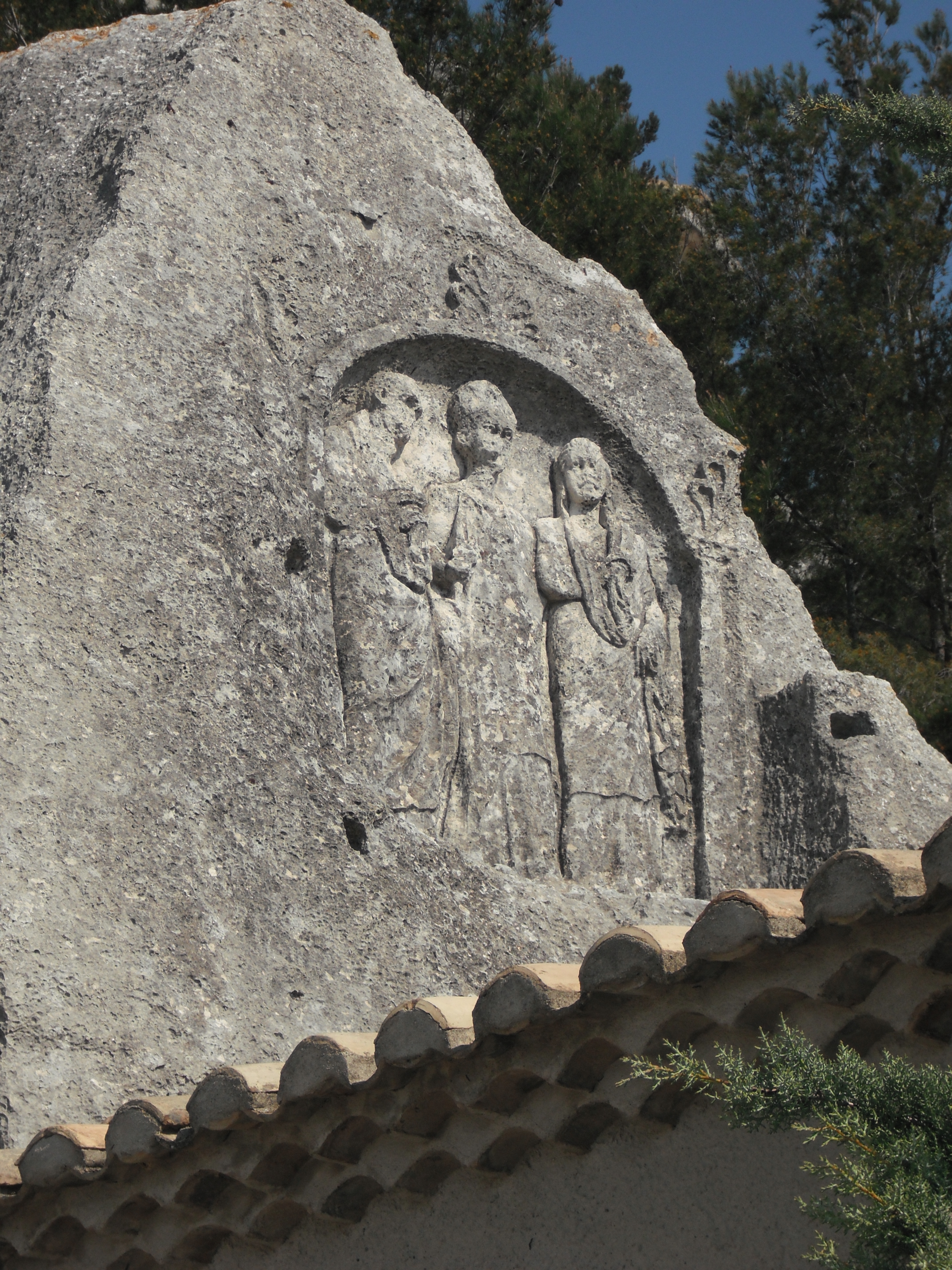
The Tremaie stele in Baux-de-Provence, depicting Marius, his wife and their fortune-teller Martha the Syrian

=== Middle Ages ===
==== Early Middle Ages ====
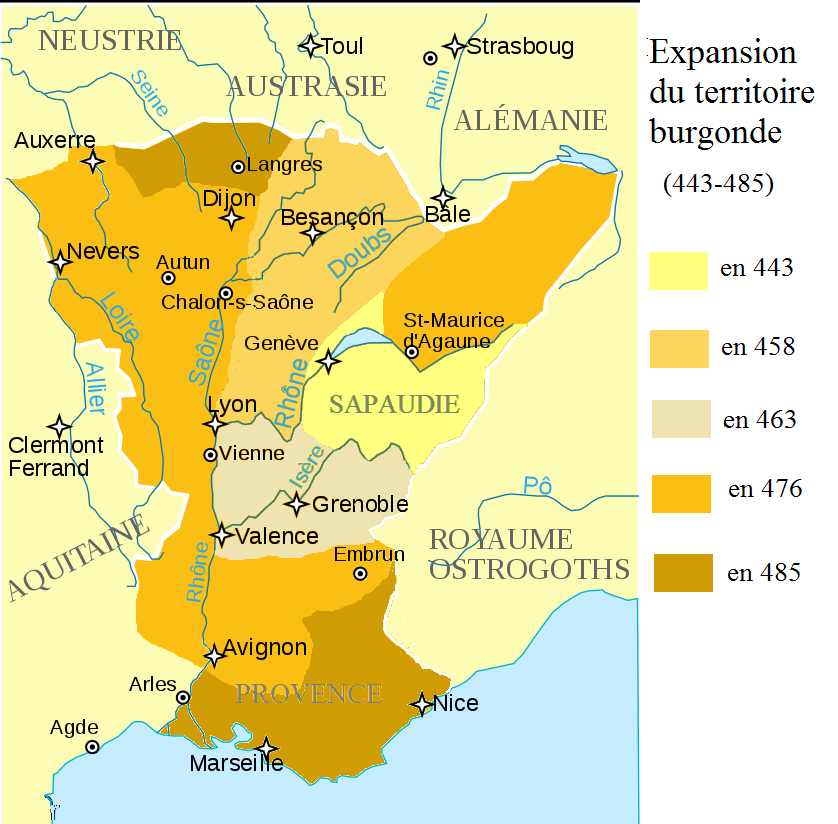
Evolution of the Kingdom of Burgundy between 443 and 485

The lower Rhône Valley experienced various invasions. The Visigoths and Alans plundered many cities and reached as far as Orange and Avignon. The Burgundians settled in the region in 442 and chose Vienne, which retained its prestige as a great Roman city, as their capital. Avignon marked the southernmost point of this kingdom. However, in 484, upon the death of the Visigoth king Euric, the Burgundians crossed the Durance and seized all of Provence, which they returned to the Visigoths in 501. In 508, the Ostrogoths in turn seized Provence and established a duchy in the south of the Burgundian kingdom, dependent on their Italo-Dalmatian realm: the Duchy of Provence, which would later become Lower Provence or the County of Provence (the Burgundian part would become the Margraviate of Provence). In 536, the Franks took possession of the duchy, partially integrating it into the Frankish kingdom of Burgundy. Charles Martel fought against the patrician of Provence, Maurontus, an ally of the Moors of Gothia, and permanently brought Provence into the Frankish domain in 736.

In 843, the Treaty of Verdun granted Provence to Lothair I. His son, Charles of Provence, made it the Kingdom of Provence-Viennois or Lower Burgundy, a short-lived entity (855–863). Upon his death, Provence was incorporated into Italy and Viennois into the Lotharingia of Lothair II. After a period of unrest, Provence was once again included in the imperial domain by the Treaty of Meerssen, though briefly, as it returned, upon the death of Emperor Louis II in 875, to the King of West Francia, Charles the Bald, again for a short time. Boson of Provence, his brother-in-law, had himself proclaimed king of the second Kingdom of Provence in 879. Boson conflicted with the Carolingians. Boson's son, Louis, who became emperor, entrusted the governance of Provence to Hugh of Arles, who in turn handed it over in 934 to Rudolph II, King of Transjurane Burgundy. The new entity became the second Kingdom of Burgundy-Provence, also known as the Kingdom of Arles. It lasted until 1032.

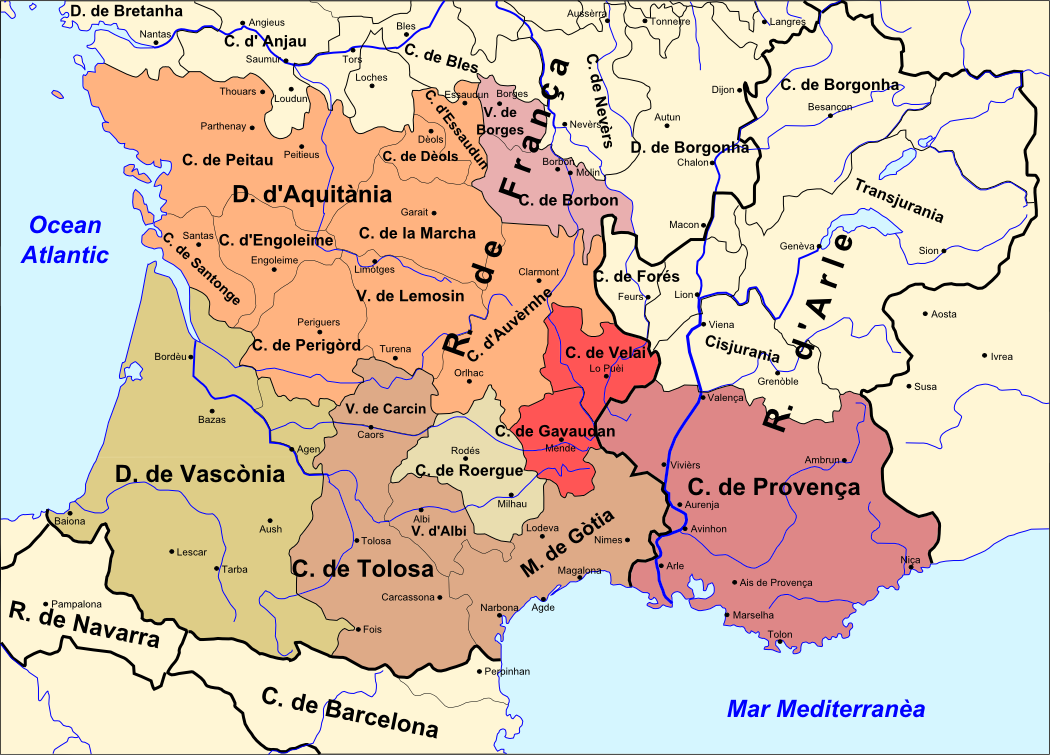
The County of Provence within the southern states around 1030

In the 880s, some Saracens from the Emirate of Al-Andalus accidentally landed on the Var coast and established a base at Fraxinet (Fraxinetum) or Freinet, traditionally located in the La Garde-Freinet region, from which they launched raids, particularly in eastern Lower Provence. Hugh of Arles led two victorious attacks against them in 931 and 942 with the help of Byzantine ships, but without pursuing the advantage to expel them entirely.

In 947, the Bosonid Boson, Count of Arles, was invested with Provence. Upon his death, his two sons, Guilhem known as the Liberator (William I) and Roubaud, jointly inherited the county, an indivision maintained by their descendants. The branch descending from Guilhem produced the Counts of Provence; the branch from Roubaud produced the Marquises of Provence.

==== The county of Provence within the Kingdom of Arles ====
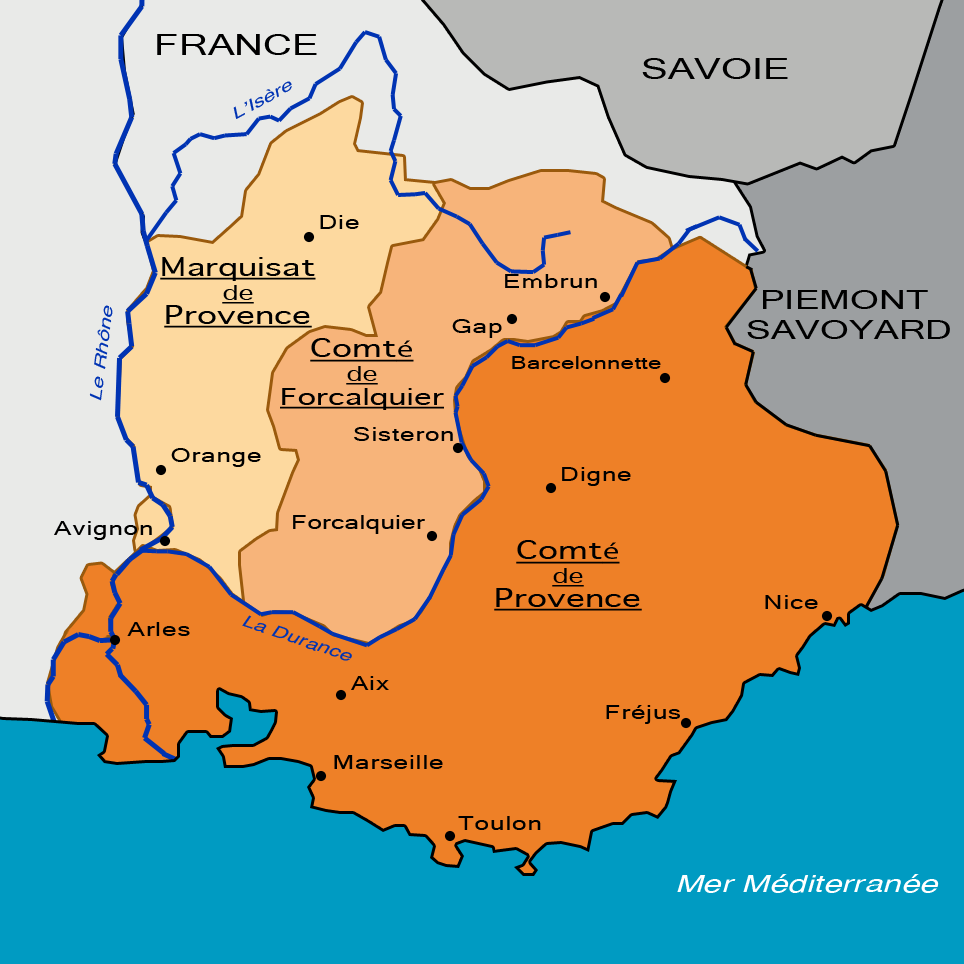
Provence was divided in 1125 into the county and marquisate of Provence and the county of Forcalquier.

The County of Provence was one of the great fiefs of the Rodolphian Kingdom of Burgundy. In 948, Conrad the Peaceful, with the support of Otto, King of Germany, reclaimed the territory south of Viennois to the Mediterranean Sea, which had been excluded from the 932 cession by Hugh of Arles to Rudolph II of Burgundy. To govern this territory, Conrad appointed counts who were loyal to him and chosen from outside Provence, since Conrad had no personal domain in Provence and thus only theoretical ownership, preferring to appoint counts who would remain faithful to him. He selected two brothers from the Mâcon region, Boson and Guillaume, sons of Rotbald or Roubaud, with the former as Count of Arles and the latter as Count of Avignon. It seems both brothers acted jointly, with the younger subordinate to the elder in managing the north, center, west, and southeast of the County of Provence. In eastern Provence, Conrad appointed a third count, Grifo or Griffon, in the region of Apt and probably Glandèves and Senez, to administer Alpine Provence. This choice of two counts from the same family in Arles and Avignon may stem from Hugh of Arles having, under the reign of Louis the Blind, unified the administration of the domain in Provence. To limit the risk of the County of Provence becoming independent of his sovereignty, Conrad divided authority by appointing two viscounts: (Note: The term viscount does not appear in the texts. Arlulf received fiscal lands and public rights in the Valley of Trets in 950 and owed homage to the Count of Arles.) one in Marseille and one in Cavaillon. The territories entrusted to the lords of Marseille and Cavaillon were separate from those of the counts of Arles, Avignon, and Apt. The viscounty of Apt quickly disappeared around 1017–1018. The appointment of distinct lords in Marseille deprived the counts of Arles and Avignon of easy access to the Mediterranean. This creation of the seigneury of Marseille is evidenced in a charter dated October 7, 948, where the bishop of Marseille, Honorat, Arlulf, and Boson are mentioned. The term “viscounty” for Marseille first appeared in 977. The autonomy of the viscounty of Marseille relative to the County of Provence only ended with the authoritative actions of Charles of Anjou in 1252 and 1257. Conrad only visited the County of Provence in 963. The Kings of Burgundy seemed to have little interest in Provence. During the reigns of Conrad I and his son Rudolph III, four or five acts relating to Provence are known.

In 972, following the kidnapping of Mayeul, Abbot of Cluny, William I, and Roubaud, with the help of Provençal lords and the Marquis of Turin, liberated Provence from the Saracens who had been pillaging the region from the Massif des Maures (above Saint-Tropez). The Battle of Tourtour marked William's final victory over the Saracens. This military campaign against the Saracens, conducted without Conrad's troops, was a means to bring Provence, its local aristocracy, and its urban and rural communities—who had until then always resisted feudal transformation and comital power—into line. It allowed William to acquire de facto suzerainty over Provence. He distributed reconquered lands to his vassals, arbitrated disputes, and thereby established Provençal feudalism. Named marquis in 975, William made Arles his capital.

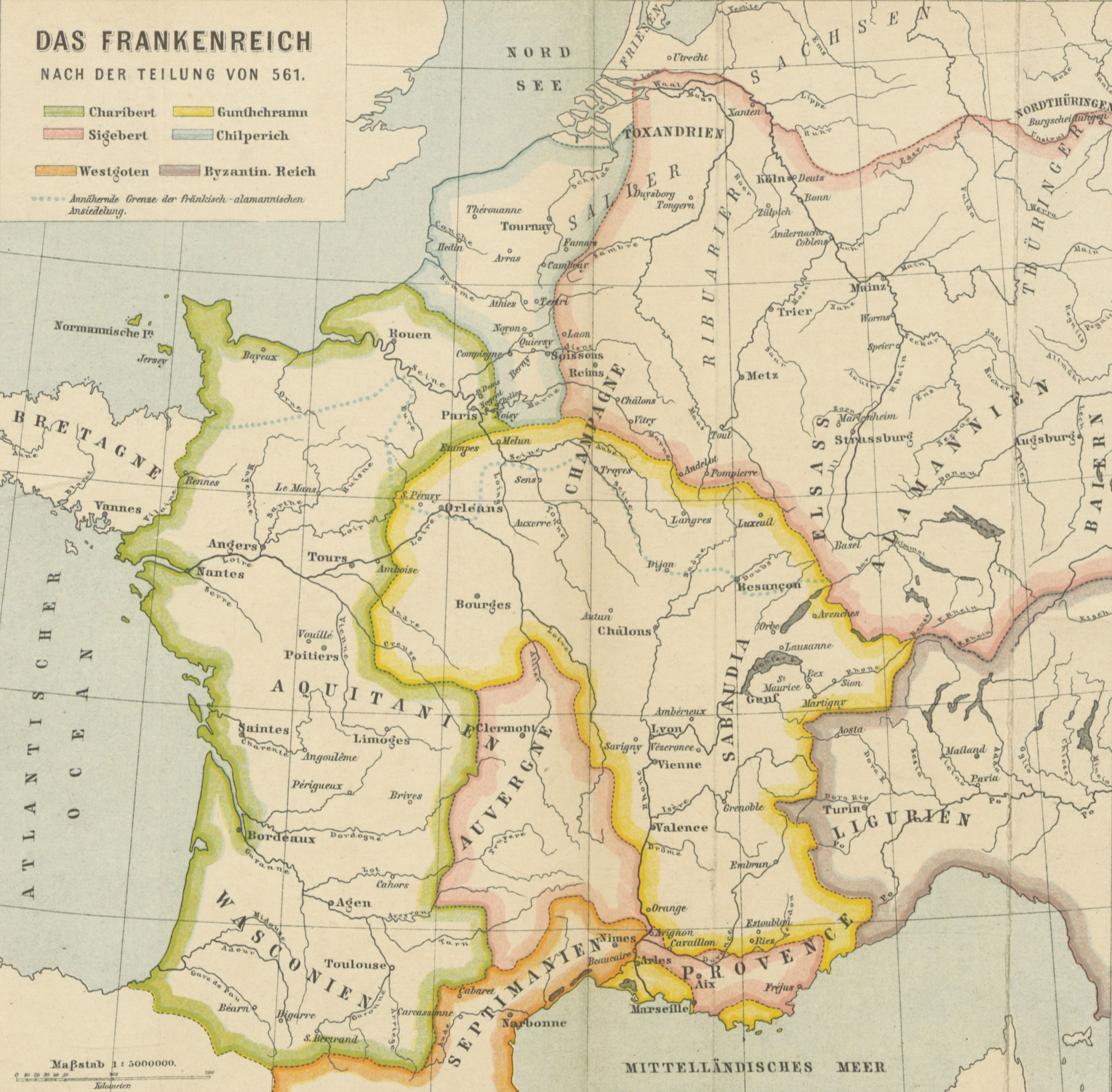
Provence divided between the Kingdom of Burgundy and the Kingdom of Austrasia in 561.

The Kingdom of Provence in 855 when the kingdom of Emperor Lothair I was divided after the Treaty of Prüm

Provence around the year 1000, within the Kingdom of Arles

The County of Provence within the Kingdom of Arles in the year 1030

Upon the death of Boson II of Arles, his two sons—William known as the Liberator, and Rotbold—shared the county jointly, a joint rule maintained by their descendants. The branch from Guilhem produced the Counts of Provence; the branch from Roubaud, from 1054 onward, produced the Counts of Forcalquier and the Marquises of Provence.

In 972, following the kidnapping of Maïeul of Cluny, Abbot of Cluny, William I, and Roubaud, with the help of Provençal lords and the Marquis of Turin, freed Provence from the Saracens who, from their fortress of Fraxinet, had been pillaging the region. This military campaign, conducted without the troops of Conrad I of Burgundy, served to subdue Provence, its local aristocracy, and the urban and rural communities that had always resisted feudal transformation and comital authority. It enabled William to gain de facto suzerainty over Provence. He distributed reconquered lands to his vassals, settled disputes, and thus established Provençal feudalism. Named Marquis in 975, William made Arles his capital.

As Rudolph III of Burgundy had no offspring, he named Conrad II the Salian, Holy Roman Emperor, as his heir. Upon Rudolph's death in 1032, the Kingdom of Burgundy—and with it the Kingdom of Arles, which included the County of Provence—was annexed to the Holy Roman Empire. However, the suzerainty of the Holy Roman Emperor over Provence thereafter was only nominal and theoretical.

In 1019, Emma, Countess of Provence, married William III of Toulouse, Count of Toulouse, transmitting the rights of Roubaud's lineage to the House of Toulouse. The title of Marquis of Provence permanently passed to this house in 1093. In 1112, Douce of Provence, heir to the rights of Guilhem's line, married Raymond-Berenger III, Count of Barcelona, who became Raymond-Berenger I of Provence. The Houses of Toulouse and Barcelona then entered into conflict over the marquisate. A treaty was concluded in 1125 between Raymond-Berenger and Alphonse-Jourdain of Toulouse: according to it, the County of Provence was divided into a marquisate north of the Durance—granted to the Counts of Toulouse—and a county to the south, granted to the Counts of Barcelona. Meanwhile, the northeastern part of the County of Provence had become de facto independent under the Count of Forcalquier. In 1193, Alfonso II of Provence married Gersande of Sabran, granddaughter of William II, Count of Forcalquier, which enabled the County of Provence to recover the southern part of the County of Forcalquier, while the northern part of this county, around Gap and Embrun, came under the suzerainty of the Dauphiné. This explains the presence of the dolphin emblem in the current coat of arms of the Provence-Alpes-Côte d’Azur region.

During this period, the County of Orange, a vassal of Provence, was elevated to a principality in 1181.

==== Late Middle Ages ====
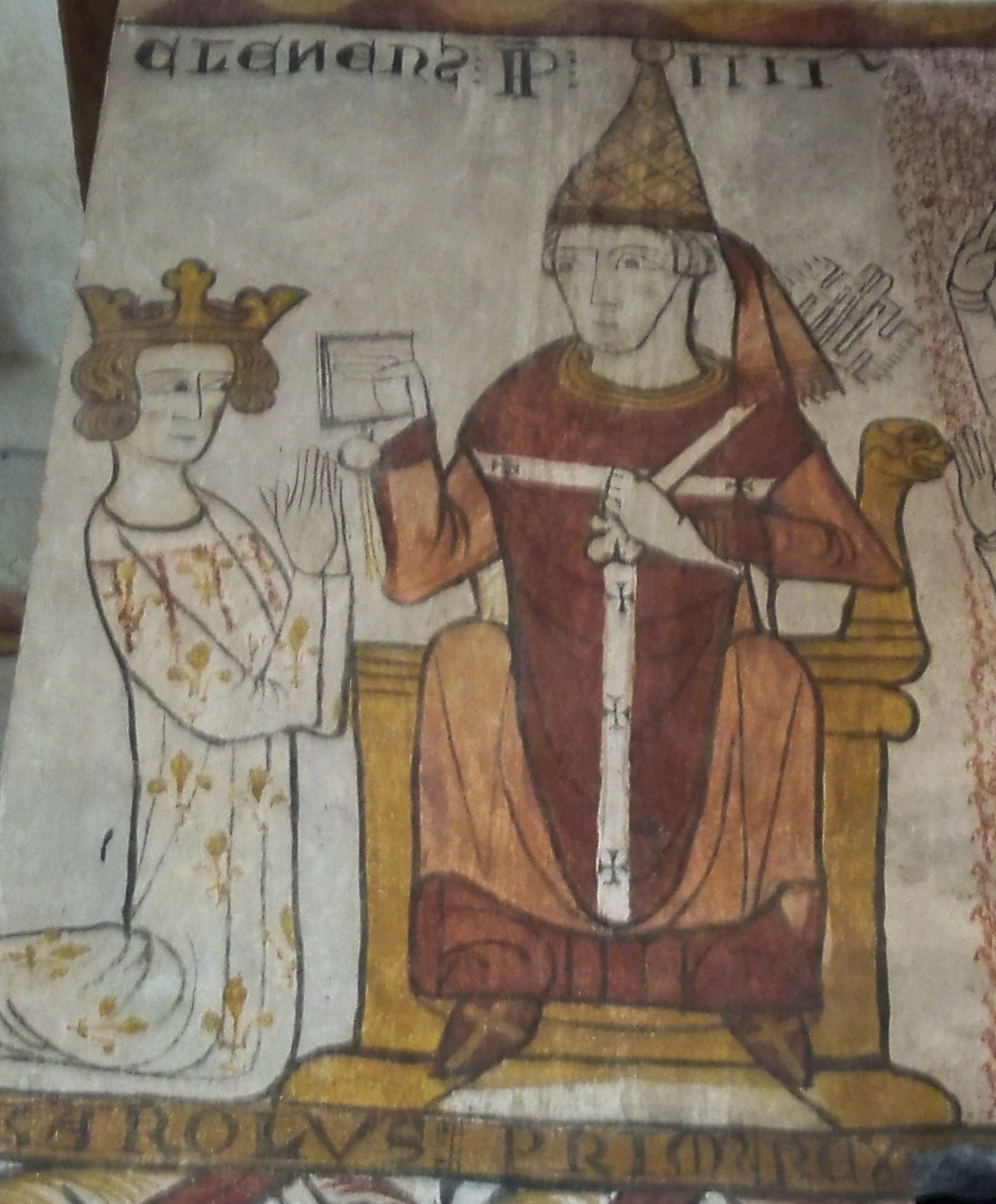
Charles I of Anjou, Count of Provence, enthroned by Pope Clement IV as King of Sicily. Fresco in the Tour Ferrande in Pernes-les-Fontaines.

In 1245, Raymond-Bérenger V of Provence died. His four daughters married respectively: Marguerite to Saint Louis (King Louis IX), Sancie to Richard of Cornwall, Eleanor to Henry III, King of England, and Beatrice to Charles, Count of Anjou and Maine, brother of Saint Louis. It was the latter who inherited the two counties of Provence and Forcalquier, passing them on to the first Capetian House of Anjou. That is why the city of Forcalquier is nicknamed "the city of the four queens." Accumulating royal titles (Naples-Sicily, Jerusalem, Cyprus, Acre, Thessalonica, etc.), the counts began calling themselves kings.

Possessions of the Capetian House of Anjou-Valois in the 15th century: comprising the Duchy of Anjou, including the County of Maine and Provence.

However, the County of Provence-Forcalquier was fragmented. Following the Treaty of Meaux-Paris (1229), which marked the end of the Albigensian Crusade, upon the death of Alphonse of Poitiers in 1271, the marquisate passed to King Philip III of France, who ceded it in 1274 to Pope Gregory X to become the Comtat Venaissin.

In 1349, neighboring region of Dauphiné became a feudal possession of the French royal House of Valois, thus expanding French influence beyond the river Rhône. In order to affirm imperial authority over the old Kingdom of Burgundy (Arles), the emperor Charles IV came to Provence in 1365, and was crowned as king of Burgundy in Arles. Since all of those regions were still considered as parts of the old Burgundian realm, within the Holy Roman Empire, the emperor appointed Amadeus VI, Count of Savoy as the imperial vicar of Burgundy (Arles). By 1378, new arrangements were made by appointing the young French prince Charles, lord of Dauphiné (future king Charles VI), as the imperial vicar of Burgundy (Arles), but only for his lifetime. Thus, the imperial influence on old Burgundian lands, including Porvence, was additionally weakened.

In 1380, queen Joanna I of Naples, who was also the ruling countess of Provence, adopted her distant cousin Louis I of Anjou, who was brother of the French king Charles V. Thus in 1382, when she died, two pretenders claimed to inherite Provence, Louis of Anjou and Charles of Naples, from the cadet branch of the Capetian House of Anjou. The latter's followers formed the Union of Aix (1382–1387), opposing Louis of Anjou, who gained supporters in western regions of Provence. Contrary to that, eastern Provence (east of the Var), being the only region that remained loyal to Charles, received no effective assistance, and thus Charles allowed it to submit to a lord of its choosing, as long as it was not an enemy. This led, in 1388, to the separation of the city of Nice and its corresponding administrative division (the viguerie), the city of Puget-Théniers, and the valleys of the Tinée and the Vésubie. Those cities nd regions formed the Terres Neuves de Provence (New Lands of Provence) and placed themselves under the protection of the House of Savoy — this is known as the Dédition of Nice to Savoy. These lands became known as the County of Nice in 1526. The upper Ubaye valley, around Barcelonnette, also came under Savoyard suzerainty. France annexed the Barcelonnette region in 1713 under the Treaty of Utrecht, and Nice in 1860 by referendum.

In time, Louis of Anjou gained control over the rest of Provence and thereby founded the second Capetian House of Anjou-Provence. This dynasty ended with the death of Charles V of Anjou in 1481.

On December 10, 1481, Count Charles III of Provence dictated a will naming King Louis XI of France as his universal heir. Charles III died the following day, December 11. On December 19, Louis XI instructed Palamède de Forbin to take possession of Provence. On December 29, the Estates (local representatives) met under the presidency of Pierre de La Jaille to acknowledge Charles III's will. Forbin convened the Estates for January 15, 1482. The acts drafted and adopted from January 1482 to April 1487 confirmed the union of Provence and France “as one principal to another principal (...) without the County and the land of Provence being subordinate to the crown [of France].” In August 1486, the Estates requested Charles VIII to proclaim the union of Provence with France as “definitive and eternal.” The King of France granted their request with royal letters in October 1486, and communicated to the Estates on April 9, 1487. Legally, it was only a personal union of crowns—the King of France acted in Provence solely as Count of Provence, and this remained so until the French Revolution. “May it please Your Majesty to style yourself [...] Count of Provence, [...] so that we are in no way obliged to obey any letter lacking this title.”

==== Precursors to Independence ====
There is no clear date of the first use of the title of Count of Provence, although an independent state had been forming for some time. The first non-Carolingian ruler of Provence was Boso who made himself king and was confirmed by the Synod of Mantaille, whose Bosonid descendants would rule Provence for a time. His son Louis was a short lasting Holy Roman Emperor who despite being crowned in 901 was twice expelled from Italy and on the second time was blinded and returned to Provence which was now effectively governed by his cousin, Hugh of Arles. Hugh moved the capital of Provence from Vienne to Arles, and when Louis died took the title Duke of Provence. Hugh became King of Italy in 926 ruling both Italy and Provence for twenty years. He traded Provence to Rudolph I of Burgundy in exchange for preserving his power in Italy. After Hugh's death Conrad of Burgundy became Count of Provence as King of Burgundy. He named a number of counts of Burgundian origin, one of whom Rotbald founded a new dynasty who would control the county for the next century and a half.

Despite unsuccessful attempts by Louis and Hugh to expel them, partially because they had been occupied in Italy, the Muslim Saracens had established a base on the coast of Provence called Fraxinetum, near modern-day Saint-Tropez. From here they controlled the mountains of the Massif des Maures and the coast between modern Fréjus and Hyères, and raided throughout Provence getting as far east as the Italian Riviera and north to the alpine valleys of Piedmont.

== Expulsion of the Saracens ==
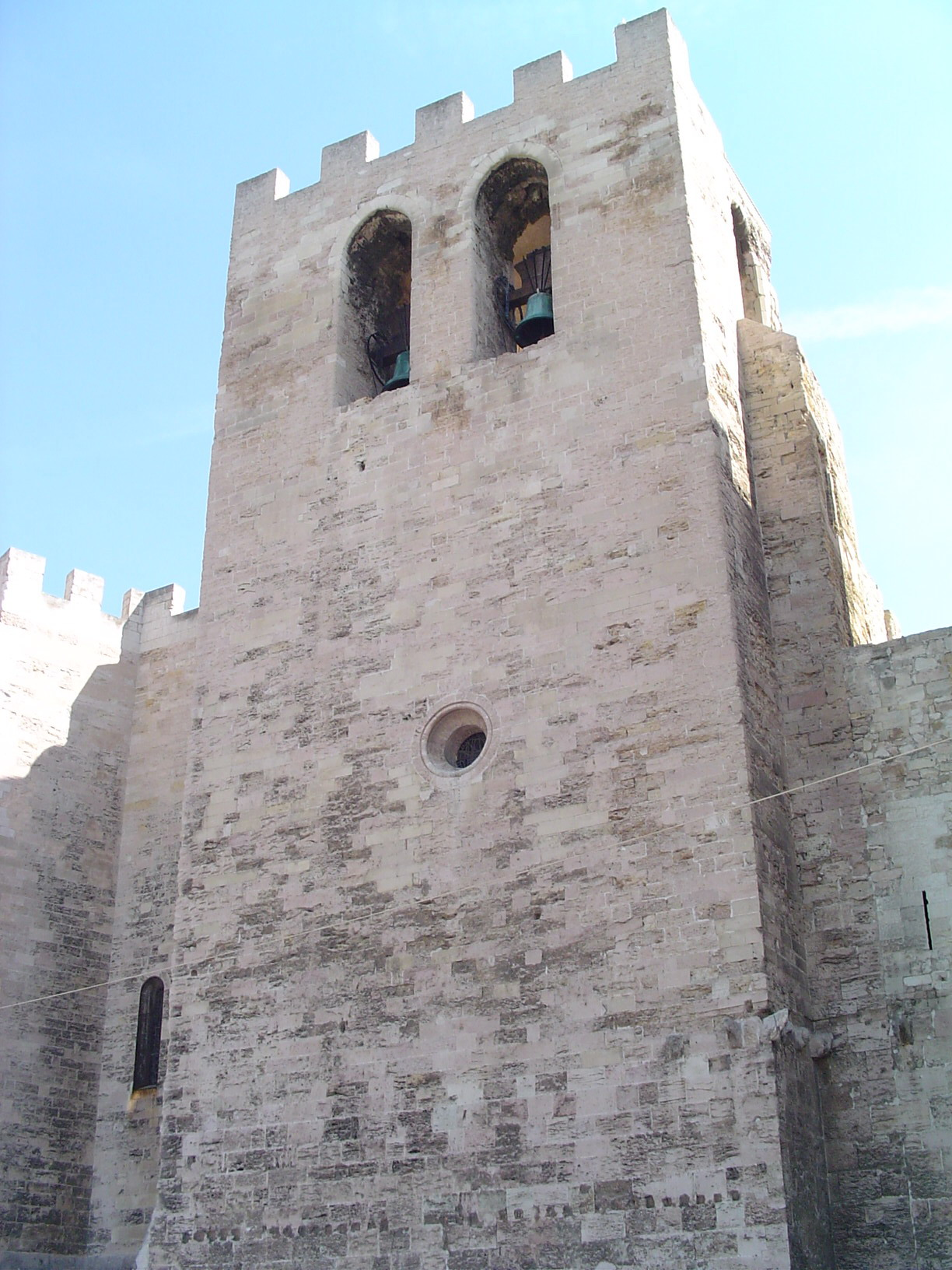
The Abbey of St. Victor, Marseille was destroyed by Saracen pirates in either 731 or 838 then rebuilt in the 11th century

In 973, the Saracens captured Maiolus, the abbot of the monastery at Cluny, and held him for ransom. The ransom was paid and the abbot was released. Count William I, the Count of Arles, organized an army with the help of allied soldiers from Piedmont, and defeated the Saracens near La Garde-Freinet at the Battle of Tourtour. The Saracens who were not killed at the battle were forcibly baptized and made into slaves, and the remaining Saracens in Provence fled the region.

The expulsion of the Saracens in 973 became an epic event in the history and legends of Provence. William became known as "William the Liberator." He distributed the lands taken from the Saracens between Toulon and Nice to his entourage. His descendants became the recognized leaders of Provence, above the other counts of the region.

During this long period of wars and banditry in Provence, the population retreated to walled cities, maritime trade was rare, and little new art or architecture, other than fortification, was created. The Provençal language was formed, closer to Latin than the French spoken in northern France. In the 11th century Provençal terms began to appear, mixed with Latin, in documents.

== Catalan dynasty (12th-13th century) ==
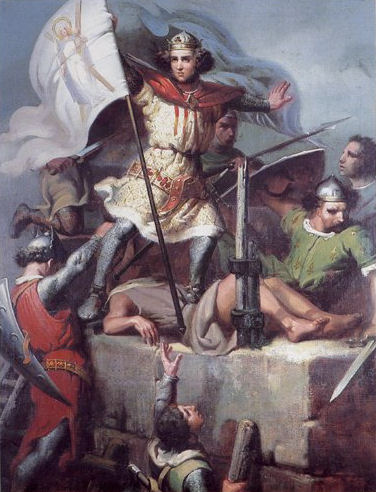
The Catalan Ramon Berenguer I, Count of Provence, in the Castle in Fos, painted by Marià Fortuny (Reial Acadèmia Catalana de Belles Arts de Sant Jordi, on deposit at the Palace of the Generalitat of Catalonia, Barcelona).

The German Emperor Conrad the Salic forced the childless King of Burgundy, Rudolph III, to name him as successor which in 1032 led to Provence becoming a fiefdom of the Holy Roman Empire, which it remained until 1246.

There was a tradition of shared inheritance practiced by the family of the Counts, leading to two lines each using the title of Count. In 1112, a descendant of Count William I, Douce I, Countess of Provence, married the Catalan Ramon Berenguer III, Count of Barcelona, who as a result became Raymond Berenguer I, Count of Provence. He ruled Provence until 1131, and his descendants, the Catalan Dynasty, ruled Provence until 1246.

The claim of the other line, sometimes using the title of Margraves of Provence, passed by marriage to William III, Count of Toulouse. This led to a long-standing Toulouse claim to the county, finally resolved by partition in 1125. Provence north and west of the Durance went to the Count of Toulouse, while the lands between the Durance and the Mediterranean, and from the Rhône to the Alps, stayed with the Counts of Provence. The capital of Provence was moved from Arles to Aix-en-Provence, and later to Brignoles. A shorter lasting partition in the next generation, between the County of Provence and the County of Forcalquier. was ended by an intra-dynastic marriage in 1193.

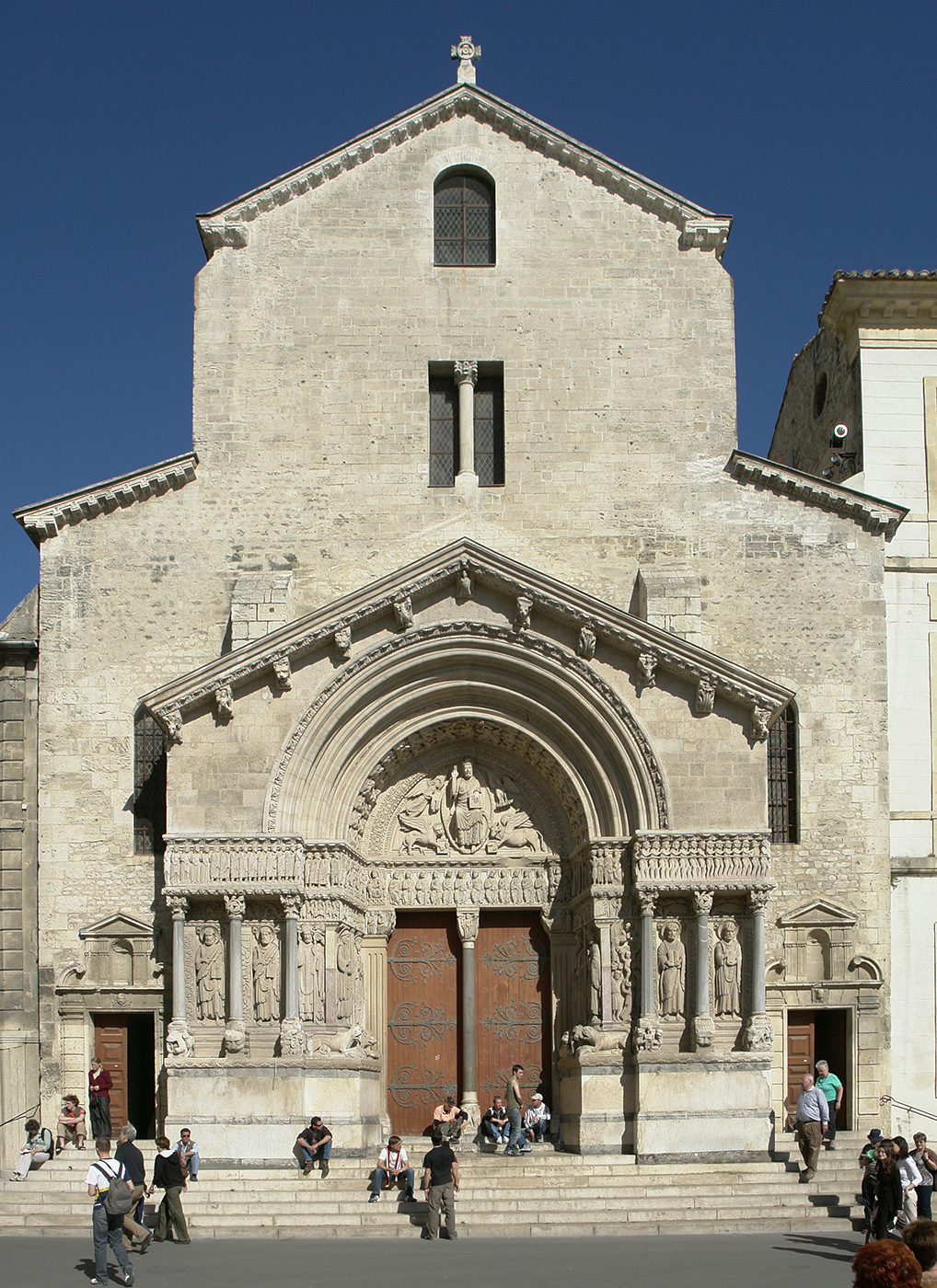
The Church of Saint Trophime in Arles (12th century)

Following the Crusades, international commerce began to resume in the ports of the Mediterranean and along the Rhône. The port of Marseille flourished again. A new city built on the Petit-Rhône, Saint-Gilles, became a transit point for cloth from Flanders and spices and the products of the eastern Mediterranean. Tarascon and Avignon on the Rhône became important trading ports.

During the 12th century some of the cities of Provence became virtually autonomous. They were ruled by consuls, formally under the Counts of Provence but with considerable autonomy. Consulates existed in Avignon in 1229, 1131 in Arles, between 1140 and 1150 in Tarascon, Nice and Grasse, and 1178 in Marseille. Marseille went farther than the others, establishing a confrerie or charitable and religious organization of the one hundred leaders of the professions, crafts and businesses in the city, which drew up a code of justice and municipal regulations. Several Provençal cities directly negotiated commercial treaties with the republics of Pisa and Genoa in Italy. Other cities, however, such as Aix, Toulon, Hyères, Digne, Cavaillon and Carpentras, remained under the authority of the Counts. In the 13th century the counts of Provence suppressed most of the consulates, but the seeds of civil liberty and democracy had been planted in the cities.

== France, Toulouse and Catalonia battle for Provence ==
In the early 13th century the Albigensian Crusade in neighboring Languedoc upset the existing order in Provence. Pope Innocent III sent missionaries and then soldiers to suppress the Cathar religious movement in Languedoc. The Pope accused Raymond VI, Count of Toulouse of supporting the Cathars, excommunicated him, and invited an army of French knights on a crusade to cleanse the south of France of the heresy. A war began in Provence between the French knights and the soldiers of Raymond VI and his son Raymond VII.

Soldiers from Tarascon, Marseille and Avignon joined the army of the Counts of Provence to fight the French. The French commander, Simon de Montfort, was killed at the siege of Toulouse in 1218. Then Raymond VI died in 1222, and a dispute over his lands in Provence began. King Louis VIII of France decided to intervene, and a French royal army marched down the valley of the Rhône and laid siege to Avignon. The city held out for three months but was finally forced by hunger to surrender. Avignon was forced to destroy its city walls and accept a French castle on the other side of the river, and by a treaty signed in Paris on April 12, 1229, the part of Provence west of the Rhône that had belonged to the Counts of Toulouse became part of France.

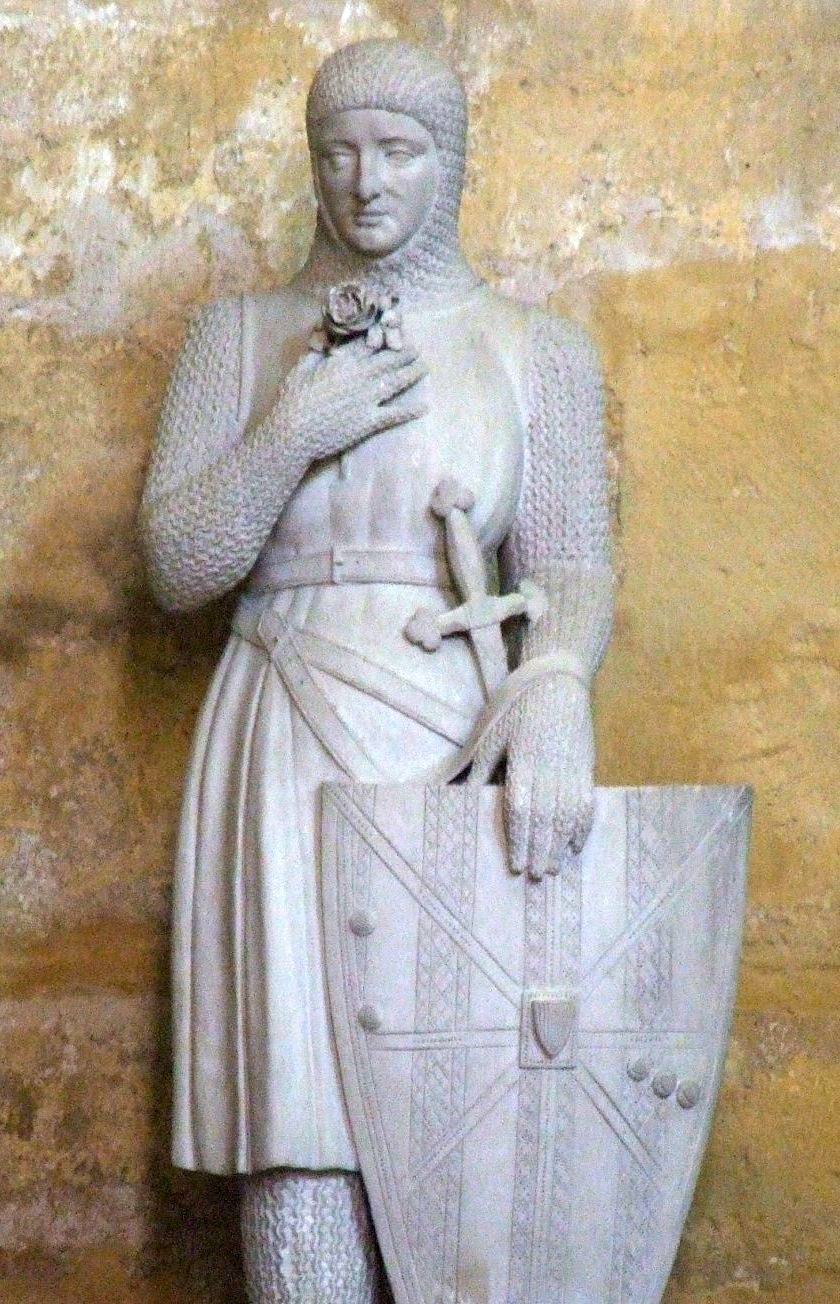
Statue of Ramon Berenguer in Aix Cathedral

Beginning in 1220, Provence east of the Rhône had a new ruler, Ramon Berenguer IV, of the Catalan dynasty. He was the first Count of Provence to actually reside in Provence permanently, usually living with his court in Aix. He launched a military campaign to impose his authority over the cities of Provence, ending the independence of Grasse and Tarascon, occupying Nice, which had tried to ally with Genoa; and founding a new town, Barcelonette, in the far east of Provence, near the Italian border.

The ambitions of Ramon Berenguer were energetically resisted by the new Count of Toulouse, Raymond VII, who had lost most of his own territory to France. Raymond VII became an ally of Marseille and Avignon in their fight against Ramon Berenguer. In 1232 his army devastated the territories of Ramon Berenguer around Tarascon and Arles.

Ramon Berenguer responded to this attack by strengthening his alliance with France; he married his daughter, Marguerite, to King Louis IX of France, and appealed to Frederick II, Holy Roman Emperor, for support. In exchange for his support, Frederic demanded that the cities of Arles and Avignon be governed by the Holy Roman Empire. A prolonged struggle took place between Raymond VII and his allies, the cities of Marseille and Avignon, against Ramon Berenguer for authority in Provence. Arles was blockaded and all traffic on the Rhône stopped.

The French army finally intervened to help Ramon Berenguer, the French king's father-in-law. Raymond VII was forced to abandon his quest, and Ramon Berenguer was able to appoint his own candidate as bishop of Avignon and to subdue the rest of eastern Provence. When Ramon Berenguer died in 1245, not quite forty years old, he controlled all of Provence between the Rhône and Italian border except the rebellious city of Marseille.

Ramon Berenguer had four daughters, but no sons. After his death his youngest daughter and heiress, Beatrice, married Charles, Count of Anjou, the youngest son of Louis VIII of France. Provence's fortunes became even more closely tied to the Angevin dynasty.

== Good King René, the last ruler of Provence ==
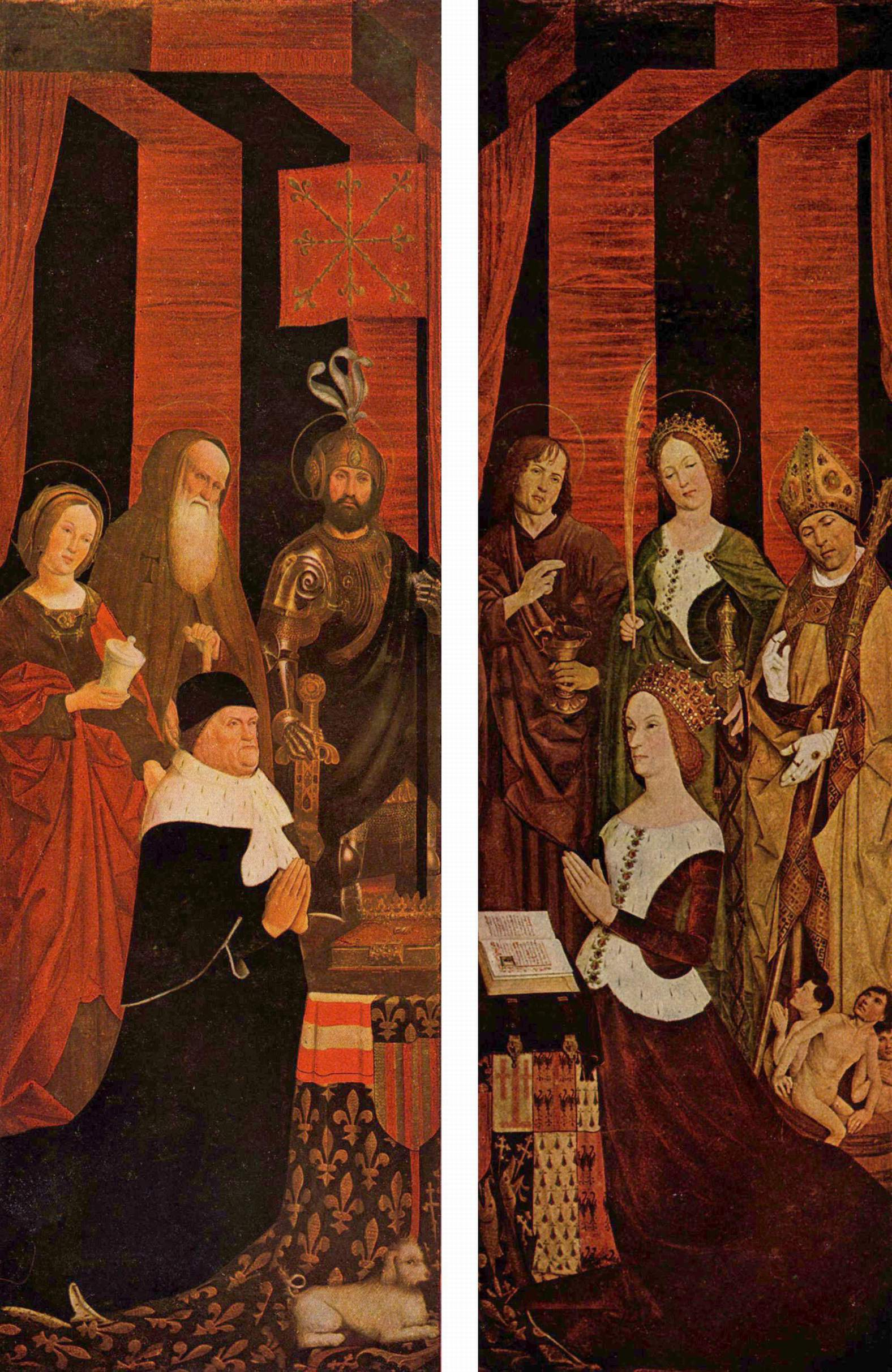
Detail of the Burning Bush triptych by Nicolas Froment, showing René and his wife Jeanne de Laval

The 15th century saw a series of wars between the Kings of Aragon and the Counts of Provence. In 1423 the army of Alphonse V of Aragon captured Marseille, and in 1443 captured Naples and forced its ruler, King René I of Naples, to flee. He eventually settled in one of his remaining territories, Provence.

History and legend has given René the title "Good King René of Provence", though he only lived in Provence in the last ten years of his life, from 1470 to 1480, and his political policies of territorial expansion were costly and unsuccessful. Provence benefitted from population growth and economic expansion, and René was a generous patron of the arts, sponsoring painters Nicolas Froment, Louis Bréa, and other masters. He also completed one of the finest castles in Provence at Tarascon, on the Rhône.

When René died in 1480, his title passed to his nephew Charles du Maine. One year later, in 1481, when Charles died, the title passed to Louis XI of France. Provence was legally incorporated into the French royal domain in 1486.

== Politics and administration ==
=== Main cities ===
The names below represent the names of the cities in Provençal, in both the classical (original and traditional) and the so-called Mistralian (modernized and French-influenced) orthographies. For the communes with only one spelling shown, it means that the spelling is the same in both writing systems, and thus the older or classically inspired form has been preserved in the phonetic (Mistralian) version.

The following translations come from Frédéric Mistral's dictionary Lou Trésor dóu Felibrige and include the names of some major present-day towns in the County of Provence, showing both their natural evolution and the influence of French—with the original -o sound, which was pronounced similarly to -ou, or the final -a becoming almost silent and resembling an -o, -e, or sometimes remaining -a depending on the region. The traditional -nh became -gn, while it remained -nh in Portuguese, which adopted the spelling used by troubadours.

The translations in the Mistralian spelling are complemented by those in the classical spelling, which is inspired by the original orthography (before the strong influence of French) to give an authentic image to the language, while generally preserving the modern evolutions of the language such as the consonantal vocalization (consonant becoming a vowel) of -l into -u, although this has been preserved in Languedoc (or Occitania).

Regardless of the spelling, the pronunciation is the same.

These classical translations come from the Provençal-French Dictionary (Diccionari provençau-francés) of the Creo-Provença association (supported by the Provence region, the General Council of Bouches-du-Rhône, the city of Aix-en-Provence, the city of Cannes, the city of Le Cannet, and the city of Mougins).

	City	Names in Latin	Names in Provençal (traditional spellings before standardizations)	Names in Provençal (Mistralian and Classical spellings)	Department
1	Marseille	Massilia > Mansella > Marsilia	Maselha > Marselha > Marcelha > Marseillo > Marsillo	Marsiho, Marselha	Bouches-du-Rhône
2	Nice	Nicæa > Nicea > Nicia	Niza > Nisa > Nissa	Niço (pop. Nissa), Niça (pop. Nissa)	Alpes-Maritimes
3	Toulon	Telo Martius > Thollonum	Tolo > Tollum > Thollon > Tollon > Tholon > Tolon > Touloun	Touloun, Tolon	Var
4	Aix-en-Provence	Aquæ Sextiæ	Ais (pop. z'Ais)	Ais (pop. z'Ais)	Bouches-du-Rhône
5	Antibes	Antipolis > Antiboles > Antibules	Antibols > Antibol > Antibo	Antibo, Antíbol	Alpes-Maritimes
6	Cannes	Castrum de Canois > Canæ	Canoa > Cano	Cano, Canas	Alpes-Maritimes
7	La Seyne-sur-Mer	Sagena	Cenha (presumed origin according to Mistral)	La Sagno, La Sanha	Var
8	Hyères	Areæ > Her > Heiræ	Ad Yeras, Az Ieras, Ieyras > Ieiras > Ieras > Iero	Iero, Ieras	Var
9	Arles	Arelas > Arelatum > Arelate	Arlese > Arles > Arlle > Arle	Arle	Bouches-du-Rhône
10	Fréjus	Forum Julii > Forojulium > Frejurium	Frejuls > Frejurs > Frejus	Frejus, Frejús	Var
11	Grasse	Crassa > Grassa	Grassa > Grasso	Grasso, Grassa	Alpes-Maritimes
12	Martigues	Martigium > Marticum > Marticus > Martigus	Martegues > Martegue > L'Ila de Martegue > Lo Martegue, Lou Martegue	Lou Martegue, Lo Martegue	Bouches-du-Rhône
13	Cagnes-sur-Mer	Caigna	Caigna > Cagno	Cagno, Canha	Alpes-Maritimes
14	Aubagne	Albania > Albanea	Albanha > Albagna > Aubagno	Aubagno, Aubanha	Bouches-du-Rhône
15	Salon-de-Provence	Salona > Salonum > Salonis > Salo	Salum > Sallon > Salon > Selho > Selo > Selon > Seloun	Seloun, Selon	Bouches-du-Rhône
16	Istres	Istrium > Istrum	Istre	Istre	Bouches-du-Rhône
17	Le Cannet	Cannetum	Cannet > Caned > Lo Canet > Lou Canet	Lou Canet, Lo Canet	Alpes-Maritimes
18	Draguignan	Dracæna > Dracænum > Draguianum > Draguinianum	Draguignan	Draguignan, Draguinhan	Var
19	La Ciotat	Civitatis > Civitas	Civitat > La Ciutat > La Ciéutat	La Ciéutat, La Ciutat	Bouches-du-Rhône

== Culture ==
=== Language ===
The historical language of Provence is Occitan (revival of the term langue d’Oc by Occitanists replacing the term Provençal language (used for the entire South) around 1930) in its dialectal grouping called Provençal. Several varieties of Provençal are distinguished: Maritime (also called Marseillais or Central), Rhodanian, Alpine (also called Gavot), and Niçard. The Alpine Provençal or Gavot was also considered a variant of Provençal. Niçard derives from medieval Provençal and has received some Northern Italian influences.

Frédéric Mistral's point of view on the langue d’Oc, called in his time the Provençal language and today more broadly Occitan: “The main dialects of modern langue d’Oc are: Provençal, Languedocian, Gascon, Aquitanian, Limousin, Auvergnat, and Dauphinois. Provençal includes the sub-dialects: Rhodanian, Marseillais (former name for Maritime), Alpine, and Niçard.”

Provence also included enclaves of Ligurian-speaking populations, whose dialect was called Figoun in Biot, Vallauris, Mouans-Sartoux, Mons, and Escragnolles. The Mentonasque dialect, spoken in Menton, is a transitional variety with Ligurian. In the Roya Valley, on the eastern borders of the Alpes-Maritimes, the Royasc and its variant Brigasc are used; both are transitional Ligurian dialects influenced by Vivaro-Alpine Occitan.

=== Literature ===
==== The age of the troubadours ====
The troubadours directly descended from the Provençal movement include Raimbaut d'Orange, Raimbaut de Vaqueiras, Albertet de Sisteron, Bertran de Lamanon, Folquet de Marseille, Blacatz, and Beatritz de Dia.

=== Personalities of the county of Provence ===
==== Writers ====
- Robert Ruffi

==== Lawyers ====
- Jean-Étienne-Marie Portalis (° 1746 - † 1807) - Jurist, lawyer, politician, co-editor of the Civil Code, defender of the Provençal nation in the Revolution

==== Musicians and singers ====
- André Campra (° 1660 - † 1744) - Composer
- Jean Gilles (° 1668 - † 1705) - Composer
- Jean-Joseph Mouret (° 1682 – † 1738) - Composer
- Antoine Peyrol (° 1709 - † 1779) - Composer of Christmas music
- Jean-Claude Trial (° 1732 – † 1771) - Violinist and composer
- Antoine Trial (° 1737 – † 1795) - Singer and actor

==== Painters ====
- Enguerrand Quarton (15th century)
- Barthélemy d'Eyck (active between 1444 and 1470)
- Nicolas Froment (c. 1430/1435 - c. 1486)
- Josse Lieferinxe (active between 1493 and 1503–08)
- Louis Parrocel (1634 - 1694)
- Joseph Parrocel (1646 - 1704)
- Nicolas Mignard (1606 - 1668)
- Jacques-Ignace Parrocel (1667 - 1722)
- François van Loo (1708 - 1732)
- Pierre Parrocel (1670 - 1739)
- Jean-Baptiste van Loo (1684 - 1745)
- Carle van Loo (1705 - 1765)
- Louis-Michel van Loo (1707 - 1771)
- Étienne Parrocel (1696 - 1776)
- Michel-François Dandré-Bardon (1700 - 1783)
- Claude Joseph Vernet (1714 - 1789)
- Philippe Sauvan (1697 - 1792)

==== Sculptors and architects ====
- Antoine Le Moiturier (° 1425 – † 1493) - Sculptor
- François de Royers de la Valfrenière (° 1575 – † 1667) - Architect
- Pierre Puget (° October 16, 1620 – † December 2, 1694)
- Jean Péru (° 1650 – † 1723) - Architect and sculptor
- Pierre II Mignard (° 1640 – † 1725) - Painter and architect, member of the Académie royale d'architecture
- Pierre Bondon (° 1716 – † 1781) - Sculptor and architect
- François II Franque (° 1710 - † 1793) - Architect, son of Jean-Baptiste Franque

=== Heraldry ===
Coat of arms: Or, four pallets gules.

The "ancient" arms of Provence are first recorded during the reign of Raymond Berenger V of Provence (1209–1245), grandson of Alfonso II of Aragon.

There are several theories regarding the origin of this coat of arms. French heraldist Michel Pastoureau suggests that the arms originated in Provence, tracing them to the Kingdom of Arles. He believes that the Counts of Barcelona, while governing Provence, brought these arms to Catalonia. However, heraldist Faustino Menéndez Pidal de Navascués challenges this theory. He contends that the coat of arms was not inherited by Ramon Berenguer IV as Count of Barcelona but was instead a 16th-century attribution that linked the Counts of Provence to the Royal House of Aragon. According to Menéndez Pidal, the arms can be traced to Alfonso II of Aragon, the grandfather of Raymond Berenger V.

== See also ==
- List of rulers of Provence
- List of Provençal royal consorts
- History of Provence
- Félibrige
- Provence-Alpes-Côte d'Azur
- County of Nice

== Bibliography ==
- Agulhon, Maurice; Coulet, Noël (2007). Histoire de la Provence [History of Provence]. Que sais-je ? (in French). Vol. 1. Paris: Presses Universitaires de France. ISBN 978-2-13-051700-9. OCLC 716711796.
- Bertrand, Régis (2012). La Provence des rois de France: 1481-1789 [The Provence of the French kings: 1481-1789]. Le temps de l'histoire (in French). Vol. 1. Aix-en-Provence: Aix-Marseille University. doi:10.4000/books.pup.13423. ISBN 978-2-85399-845-1. OCLC 826850248.
- Benoit, Fernand (1992). La Provence et le Comtat Venaissin. Arts et traditions populaires [Provence and the Comtat Venaissin. Folk art and traditions] (in French). Aubanel. ISBN 2-7006-0061-4.
- Guérard, Benjamin; Marion, Jules; Deslile, Léopold (1857). Guérard, Benjamin Edme Charles (ed.). Cartulaire de l'abbaye de Saint-Victor de Marseille [Cartulary of the Abbey of Saint-Victor of Marseille]. Documents inédits sur l'histoire de France / histoire politique / cartulaires de France (in French). Vol. 1. Paris: Ch. Lahure. doi:10.1017/CBO9780511734601. ISBN 978-1-108-01947-7. OCLC 758940738.
- Marseille, Jacques (2002). Dictionnaire de la Provence et de la Côte d'Azur [Dictionary of Provence and the Côte d'Azur] (in French). Paris: Larousse. ISBN 2-03-575105-5.
- Mazel, Florian (2011). "Pouvoir comtal et territoire: réflexion sur les partages de l'ancien comté de Provence au XIIe siècle" [Countship and territory: reflection on the division of the former county of Provence in the 12th century]. Mélanges de l'École française de Rome: Moyen Âge (in French). 123 (2): 467–486. doi:10.4000/mefrm.634. OCLC 7685512090.
- Poupardin, René (1907). Le royaume de Bourgogne (888-1038): étude sur les origines du royaume d'Arles [The Kingdom of Burgundy (888-1038): a study of the origins of the Kingdom of Arles]. Bibliothèque de l'École des hautes études / sciences historiques et philologiques (in French). Vol. 1. Paris: H. Champion. OCLC 422260687.
- Rouquette, Jean-Maurice (1974). Galice romane, Provence romane 1. La Provence rhodanienne [Romanesque Galicia, Romanesque Provence 1. The Provence along the Rhône] (in French). Zodiaque.
- Wilson, Peter (2016). Heart of Europe: A History of the Holy Roman Empire. Cambridge: Harvard University Press. ISBN 978-0-674-91592-3.
