= Pelat Massif =

Massif in the Maritime Alps

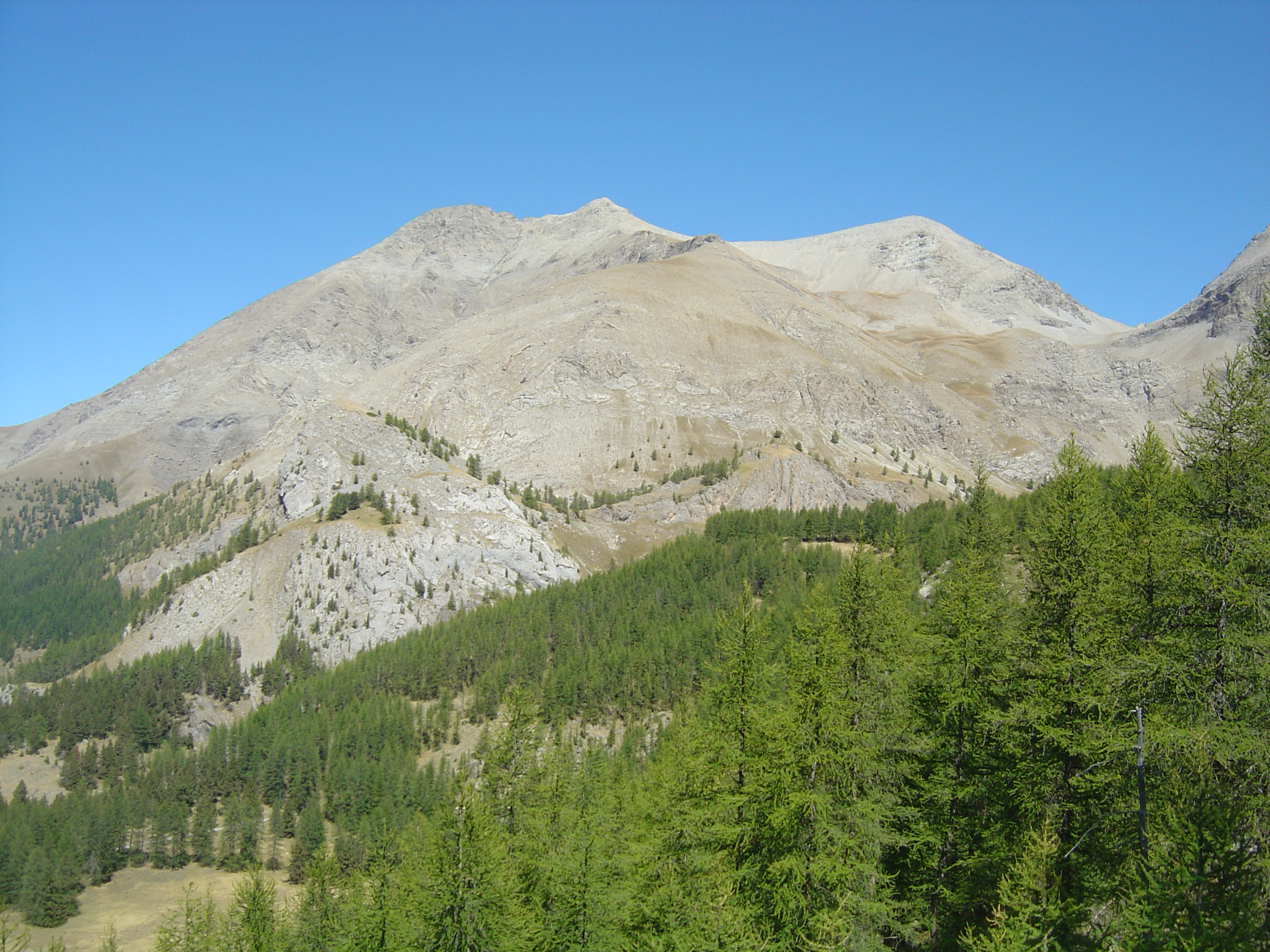
- Mont Pelat

Highest point
- Elevation: 3,051 m (10,010 ft)
- Parent peak: Mont Pelat

Naming
- Native name: Massif du Pelat (French)

Geography
- The massif is in the southern part of the Western Alps
- Country: France
- Departments: Drôme; Isère
- Region: Auvergne-Rhône-Alpes
- Parent range: French Prealps

Geology
- Rock type(s): Marl, limestone, schist, sandstone

The Pelat Massif is a massif in the French Alps located in the departments of Alpes-de-Haute-Provence and Alpes-Maritimes. Its name comes from the main peak of the massif.

== Geography ==
=== Main peaks ===
- Mont Pelat, 3,051 m (10,010 ft)
- Mount Cimet, 3,020 m (9,910 ft)
- Téton, 2,969 m (9,741 ft)
- Trou de l'Aigle, 2,961 m (9,715 ft)
- Grand Cheval de Bois, 2,838 m (9,311 ft)
- Sommet des Garrets, 2,822 m (9,259 ft)
- Sommet de la Frema, 2,747 m (9,012 ft)
- Grandes Tours du Lac, 2,745 m (9,006 ft)
- Montagne de l'Avalanche, 2,729 m (8,953 ft)
- Grand Coyer, 2,693 m (8,835 ft)
- Tête de l'Encombrette, 2,682 m (8,799 ft)
- Petit Coyer, 2,580 m (8,460 ft)
- Mouriès, 2,540 m (8,330 ft)
- Aiguilles de Pelens, 2,523 m (8,278 ft)
- Mont Saint-Honorat, 2,520 m (8,270 ft)
- Puy du Pas Roubinous, 2,516 m (8,255 ft)

=== Geology ===
The Pelat Massif is composed of:

- schist in the northern, highest zone (summits of Le Cimet and Mont Pelat),
- sedimentary rocks, mainly limestone, sandstone, and marl, in the southern part.

The southern part of the massif is characterized by the outcrop of the Priabonian series, consisting, from bottom to top, of nummulitic limestone, blue marl, and Annot sandstone. This series creates a characteristic stratification of a white limestone bar, an area of softer reliefs, or even ravines, followed by sandstone bars, which are prominently visible in the landscape around Annot.
