= Union of Aix =

14th-century confederation in France

The Union of Aix, founded in 1382, was a confederation of cities of Provence. It supported the party of Charles of Durazzo against the Capetian Louis I, Duke of Anjou during the unrest that followed the capture and death of Queen Joanna I of Naples, Countess of Provence. The resultant civil war finally ended in the defeat of the Union of Aix and the recognition of Louis II of Anjou as Count of Provence, along with the cession of Nice to Savoy.

== Background ==
The childless Joan, Queen of Naples and Countess of Provence, designated her cousin, Charles of Durazzo, as her heir in 1370. However, she soon alienated him by marrying Otto, Duke of Brunswick-Grubenhagen, thus also making an enemy of Louis I of Hungary, the ally and overlord of Charles, who governed Croatia. As a result, she turned to Louis of Anjou, the powerful son of the King of France, whom she secretly adopted in exchange for military assistance. The news of this event escaped authorized circles quickly and arrived at Tarascon on 22 October 1380, where it caused worry among the Provençal lords, who had fought Louis in the past

As the news reached Charles, he immediately descended on Naples with a Hungarian army reaching Rome on the 11th of November. Having misjudged the situation, Joan was left with no option but to fight. She called on her Provençal subjects and Louis I for help, but before they could arrive Charles had defeated Otto of Brunswick and taken Naples. Joan was imprisoned just as a fleet from Marseille arrived to relieve the city.

== Formation ==
The Provençal cities gathered in response to these threats. Ignorant of the Queen's fate, they sent several embassies to Naples, but these were unsuccessful. The cities and towns of Provence, led by Aix, eventually organized into a union. When Louis travelled to Avignon to receive the allegiance of the Provençal lords, Aix refused. While some lords were willing to offer support for Louis, particularly Marseille and Arles, this was conditional on the rescue of Joan.

As Louis marched south to rescue the Queen and take Naples at the head of a powerful army, Charles, who had been largely abandoned by his Hungarian allies, had her suffocated, but in such a way that suggested a natural death. On July 31, 1382, he had her remains transported to Santa Chiara so that they could be inspected in order to assure the various groups concerned that her death had been natural. The ambassador of the Union of Aix reported exactly that back to Provence, and the Union shifted its support to Charles of Durazzo, as the heir of the queen in Provence.

Louis of Anjou appealed to all of Queen Joan's dead subjects to immediately take up arms against the "rebellious" cities of the Union. Marseille attacked the galleys of the Union cities of Toulon and Hyères in the Mediterranean. The Marseiilaise then laid siege to Châteauneuf-les-Martigues from March 28 to 31, then seized Auriol on April 22. Finally, they besieged and sacked Sarret. Forces sent by the King of France laid siege to Aix, but were ravaged by a plague and withdrew. Louis, meanwhile, transferred the Royal Court of Provence from Aix to Marseilles via decree.

Meanwhile, Charles' troops under Balthazar Spinola devastated eastern Provence. They then combined with revolting Languedociennes known as Tuchins to ravage the countryside around Arles. Led by Eienne Auguer, they took Arles with internal help on 24 July. Battles raged between pro- and anti-Tuchin forces in the city's streets avec des complicités internes. Le viguier de la ville est tué. Après quelques heures de troubles, les habitants se révoltent contre les Tuschins et les chassent de la cité. Le lendemain, une répression sévère est menée contre leurs partisans, but the Union forces eventually withdrew.

Louis of Anjou died on September 24, 1383, in the midst of his campaign to conquer Naples. His death strengthened the position of the anti-Louis Union, which continued to oppose his son, Louis II of Anjou, and his mother, Marie of Blois, Duchess of Anjou. However, it also cleared several obstacles preventing Louis from begin recognized as Count of Provence; while his father had campaigned against Provence before claiming it, Louis II had no such negative connotations among the Provençal lords. Marie de Blois took up residence at Avignon with Louis, where he received the homage of many lords. She promised tax cuts and greater autonomy in the winter, prompting Arles, now no longer held by the Union, to recognize him.

== Fall ==
It was now that the decisive turning point of the war came to pass : Charles of Durazzo was killed in Hungary on 5 February 1386. His son was expelled from Naples. Meanwhile, Aix itself began negotiations with Louis, but dragged these out in an attempt to secure better terms. The Union's forces began to desert, however, and on October 21, 1386, Louis II was recognized by the Union as Count of Provence, where he made a solemn entry into Aix.

Unexpectedly, Provence east of the Var, that is to say, the country of Nice, was left alone to face supporters of Anjou and not covered by the negotiations. Ladislau of Durazzo, Charles' son was unable to help his remaining followers. In early 1388, before the threat of conquest and the inability of Durazzo to defend the city fathers of Eastern Provence send a delegation to Ladislau to ask for help. He replied that the lords of Nice might choose whatever lord they wish for protection, so long as that lord were not his opponent. The councilors elected Amadeus VII, Count of Savoy, called the "Red Count", who enthusiastically seized the opportunity to annex Nice and gain a Mediterranean port. He arrived at the abbey of Saint-Pons, near Nice, September 2. The next day, September 28, 1388, is written by a notary pact of cession under which the Count of Savoy undertakes to govern and protect Nice and its people. This document finalizes the cession of Nice to Savoy.
