= Henri Malançon =

French painter

Henri Malançon (December 20, 1876 – December 20, 1960) was a French painter born in Paris. He died in Voutenay-sur-Cure, Yonne of France.

== Early life ==
Malançon was born in Parisian middle-class family. His father was a banker, and Malancon was raised by his step-mother, Marie-Comélie Falcon, a well-known lyric tragedian under the July Monarchy (often indicated, indiscriminately, as his grandmother). He completed his secondary education at Louis-le-Grand, where he studied classic culture.

At age twenty-three, he married Alice Josse on May 24, 1899. Their daughter Germaine married Gaston Bergery, an official close to the Left-Wing Coalition and the influential journalist Georges Boris, who would have an important role in the Resistance. Malançon divorced on May 24, 1924, and, a year later, married painter Antoinette Destrem (1881 – 1942). She died during the Second World War.

== Painter ==
In 1904, after his military service, he joined the Julian Academy, where he learned painting. He stayed there for two years and become friendly with Yves Alix, Pierre Bompard, sculptor Vigoureux, Maurice Savin, Souverbie, Georges Braque, Dunoyer de Segonzac, Frédéric Deshayes, La Fresnaye, Legueult and André Lhote. On Braque's advice, he pursued his studies, from 1905 to 1914, in the Humbert Academy.

After World War I, in which he was called up for military service, Malançon began his painting career. He stayed in regions where landscapes served as a source of inspiration for him. He first chose Brittany and then Normandy. A watercolour painting of him showed Manlançon and his wife painting Honfleur, while an oil painting by Malançon showed Paul-Elie Gernez painting the famous Calvados Port.

In 1930, he organised, in the Galerie Eugène Druet, a personal exposition of 25 paintings. Critic Louis Vauxcelles wrote in the 2 March 1930 Carnet de la Semaine, “Malançon – that I have appreciated for a long time and Segonzac, Moreau, Simon Levy, Gernez share my feeling – is today at his best. This indecisive person in quest for himself for a long time, was frightened to death up to today. His consents, with a unique and precious harmony, the firmness of his construction, are of its own. Malançon, indifferent to the success and congenitally unable to do the lower movement of pushiness, was like surprised, I will say stunned of the success best people give to him...”

Malançon often left Paris, where he lived at 80 Pierre-Demours street, to paint in Céret, Saint-Tropez, in Camac (where Bompart joined him), Pont-l'Abbé, Saint-Paul-de-Vence and Gargilesse in Creuse.

In 1934, the Malançons discovered the Vézelay's hill. This site became a favorite. They bought, in 1940, a house in Voutenay-sur-Cure, not far from Vézelay, where they settled during the Nazi Occupation. Antoinette died in February 1942, asking her governess, Lucienne Sauterau, to take care of her husband.

Affected by Antoinette's death, Malançon hardly painted during the 1940s. The war years war were marked by his activities in the French resistance, with Sautereau, in the network F2. From December 1944 to the Liberation of France, they accommodated underground an officer from the British Royal Air Force.

Malançon died on December 20, 1960.
