= Charol =

Charol may refer to:

- Charol Shakeshaft (fl. 1994–present), educational researcher
- Dorothea Charol (1889–1963), Russian-born German Art Deco sculptor
- Michael Charol (1894–1970), pseudonym Michael Prawdin, Russian-German historical writer
- Rey Charol (1936–1990), Uruguayan film and television actor
- Kid Charol, ring name of Esteban Gallard (1901–1929), Cuban boxer
- nickname of Jaime González (Colombian footballer) (1938–1985), Colombian footballer

== See also ==
- Charols, a commune in France
