= Saint-Marcel-lès-Sauzet =

- Commune
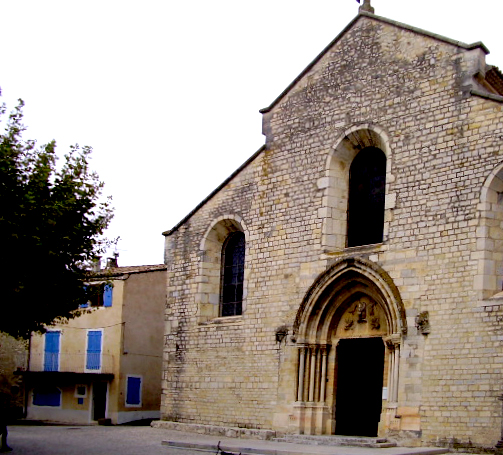
- The church of Saint-Marcel-lès-Sauzet
- Location of Saint-Marcel-lès-Sauzet
- Location within France Location within Auvergne-Rhône-Alpes
- Coordinates: 44°35′46″N 4°48′18″E
- Country: France
- Region: Auvergne-Rhône-Alpes
- Department: Drôme
- Arrondissement: Nyons
- Canton: Dieulefit
- Intercommunality: Montélimar Agglomération

Government
  - Mayor (2020–2026): Yves Lévêque
- Area^{1}: 3.98 km^{2} (1.54 sq mi)
- Highest elevation: 290 m (950 ft)
- Lowest elevation: 104 m (341 ft)
- Population (2023): 1,228
  - Density: 309/km^{2} (799/sq mi)
- Time zone: UTC+01:00 (CET)
  - Summer (DST): UTC+02:00 (CEST)
- INSEE/Postal code: 26312 /26740
- ^{1} French Land Register data, which excludes lakes, ponds, glaciers > 1 km^{2} (0.386 sq mi or 247 acres) and river estuaries.

Saint-Marcel-lès-Sauzet (French pronunciation: [sɛ̃ maʁsɛl lɛ sozɛ], literally Saint-Marcel near Sauzet; Occitan: Sant Marcèu de Sauset) is a commune in the Drôme department in southeastern France.

== Population ==
Historical population
Year	Pop.	±% p.a.
1968	358	—
1975	405	+1.78%
1982	620	+6.27%
1990	1,025	+6.49%
1999	1,104	+0.83%
2007	1,130	+0.29%
2012	1,171	+0.72%
2017	1,244	+1.22%
2023	1,228	−0.22%
Source: INSEE

== See also ==
- Communes of the Drôme department
