= Condillac =

Condillac may refer to:

- Étienne Bonnot de Condillac (1715–1780), French philosopher
- Condillac, Drôme, a commune of the Drôme département in France
