= La Laupie =

- Commune
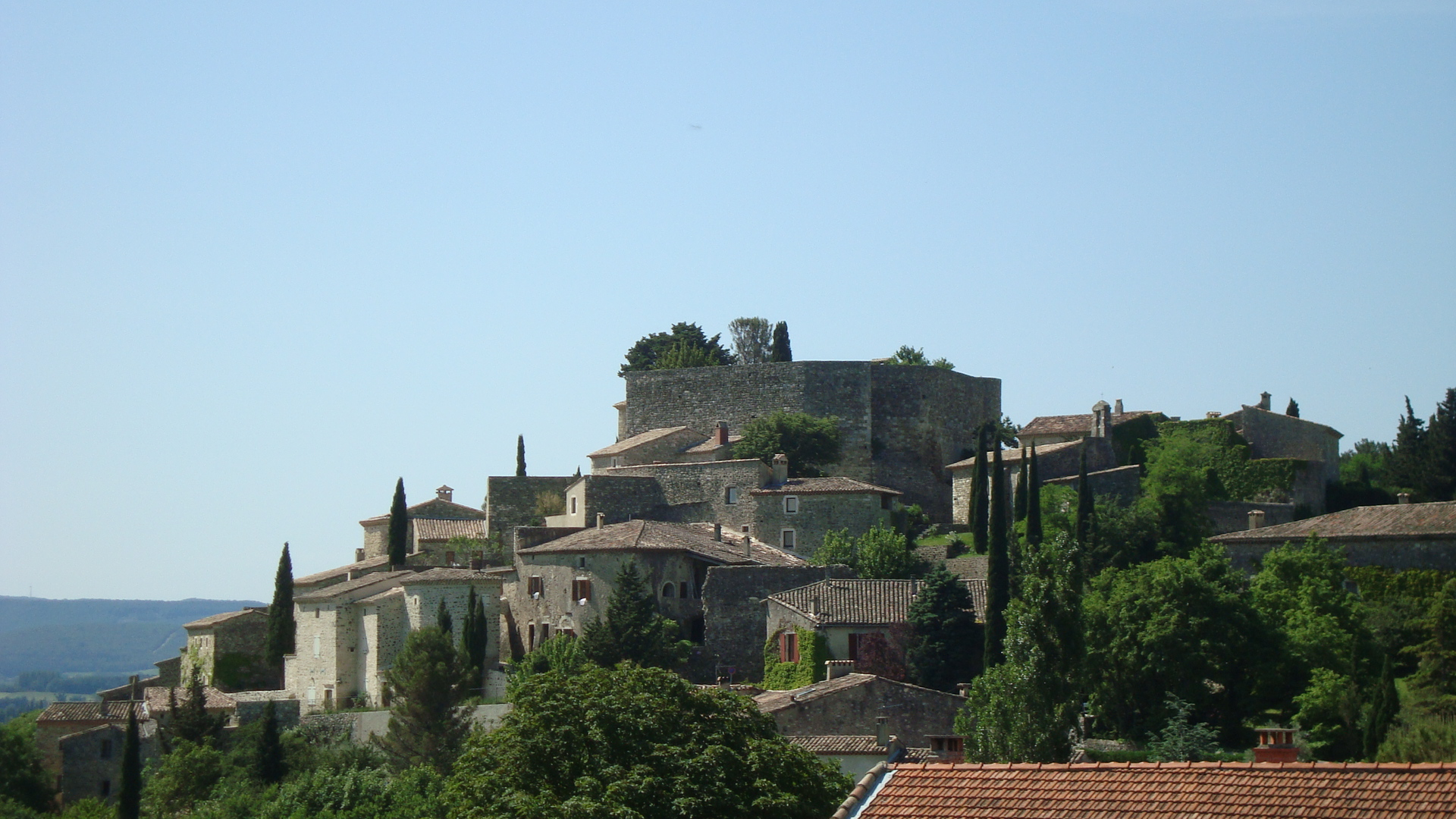
- A general view of La Laupie
- Location of La Laupie
- Location within France Location within Auvergne-Rhône-Alpes
- Coordinates: 44°36′39″N 4°50′49″E
- Country: France
- Region: Auvergne-Rhône-Alpes
- Department: Drôme
- Arrondissement: Nyons
- Canton: Dieulefit
- Intercommunality: Montélimar Agglomération

Government
  - Mayor (2020–2026): Yannick Albrand
- Area^{1}: 9.68 km^{2} (3.74 sq mi)
- Elevation: 187 m (614 ft)
- Highest elevation: 510 m (1,670 ft)
- Lowest elevation: 116 m (381 ft)
- Population (2023): 789
  - Density: 81.5/km^{2} (211/sq mi)
- Time zone: UTC+01:00 (CET)
  - Summer (DST): UTC+02:00 (CEST)
- INSEE/Postal code: 26157 /26740
- ^{1} French Land Register data, which excludes lakes, ponds, glaciers > 1 km^{2} (0.386 sq mi or 247 acres) and river estuaries.

La Laupie (French pronunciation: [la lopi]; Occitan: La Làupia) is a commune in the Drôme department in southeastern France.

== Population ==
Historical population
Year	Pop.	±% p.a.
1968	346	—
1975	374	+1.12%
1982	550	+5.66%
1990	529	−0.49%
1999	588	+1.18%
2007	656	+1.38%
2012	738	+2.38%
2017	756	+0.48%
2023	789	+0.71%
Source: INSEE

== See also ==
- Communes of the Drôme department
