= Cléon-d'Andran =

- Commune
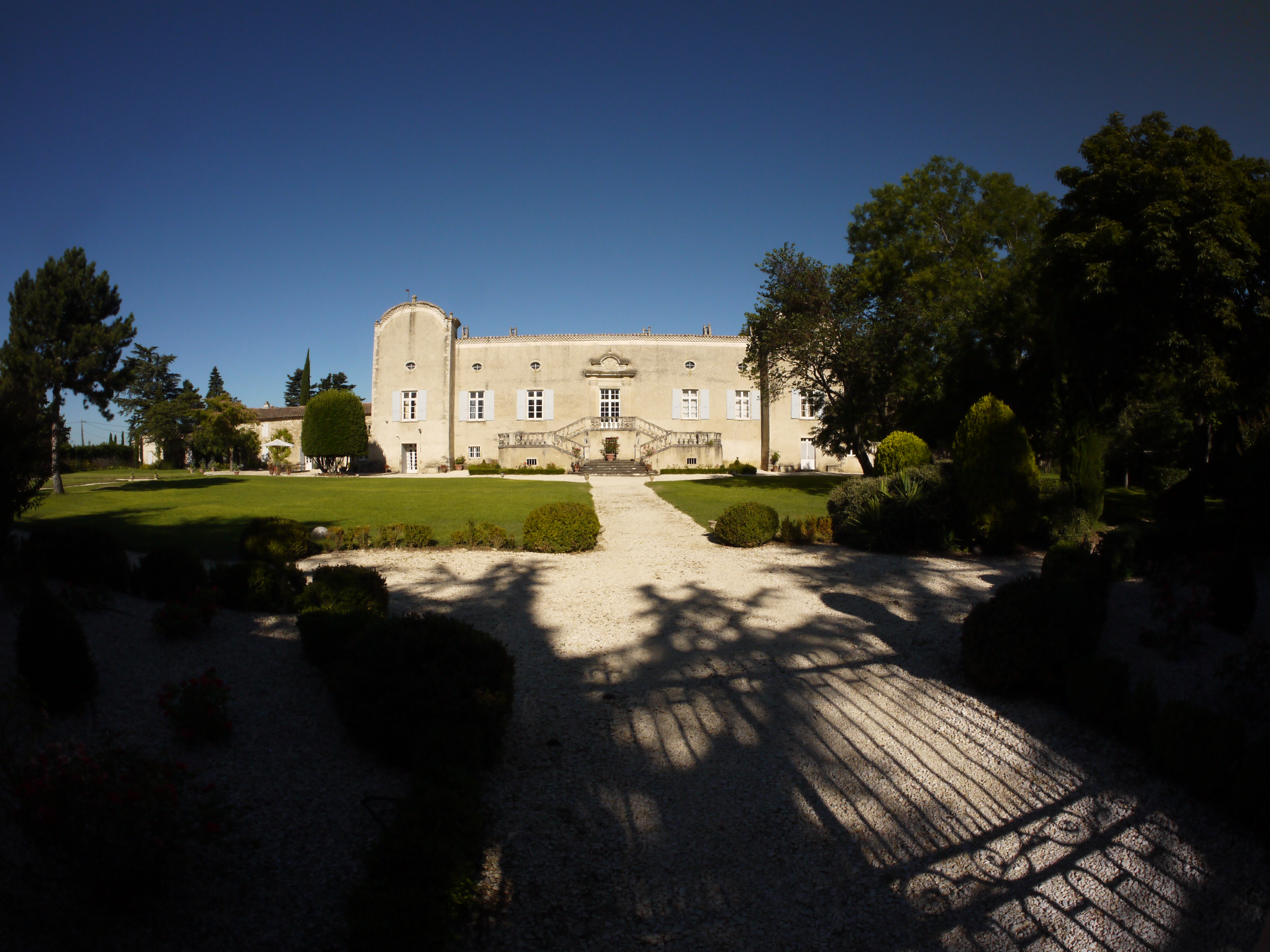
- Château de Genas
- Location of Cléon-d'Andran
- Location within France Location within Auvergne-Rhône-Alpes
- Coordinates: 44°36′43″N 4°56′11″E
- Country: France
- Region: Auvergne-Rhône-Alpes
- Department: Drôme
- Arrondissement: Nyons
- Canton: Dieulefit
- Intercommunality: Montélimar Agglomération

Government
  - Mayor (2020–2026): Fermin Carrera
- Area^{1}: 10.25 km^{2} (3.96 sq mi)
- Highest elevation: 222 m (728 ft)
- Lowest elevation: 165 m (541 ft)
- Population (2023): 1,004
  - Density: 97.95/km^{2} (253.7/sq mi)
- Time zone: UTC+01:00 (CET)
  - Summer (DST): UTC+02:00 (CEST)
- INSEE/Postal code: 26095 /26450
- ^{1} French Land Register data, which excludes lakes, ponds, glaciers > 1 km^{2} (0.386 sq mi or 247 acres) and river estuaries.

Cléon-d'Andran (French pronunciation: [kleɔ̃ dɑ̃dʁɑ̃]; Occitan: Cleon d'Andran) is a commune in the Drôme department in southeastern France.

== Population ==
Historical population
Year	Pop.	±% p.a.
1968	577	—
1975	601	+0.58%
1982	630	+0.68%
1990	718	+1.65%
1999	800	+1.21%
2007	904	+1.54%
2012	900	−0.09%
2017	836	−1.46%
2023	1,004	+3.10%
Source: INSEE

== See also ==
- Communes of the Drôme department
