= Montboucher-sur-Jabron =

- Commune
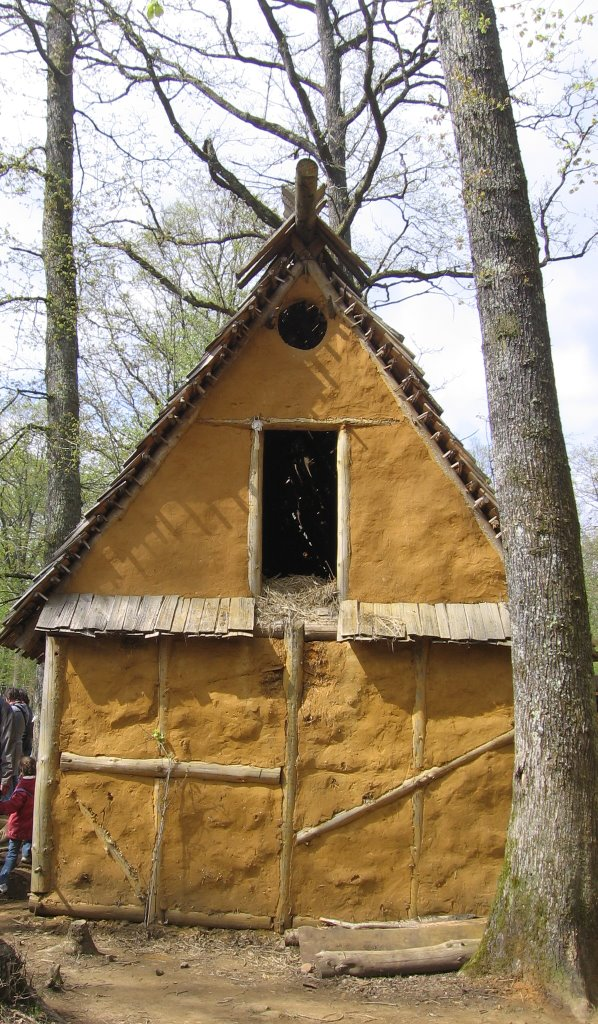
- A reconstructed clay house of the high Middle Ages
- Location of Montboucher-sur-Jabron
- Location within France Location within Auvergne-Rhône-Alpes
- Coordinates: 44°33′20″N 4°48′33″E
- Country: France
- Region: Auvergne-Rhône-Alpes
- Department: Drôme
- Arrondissement: Nyons
- Canton: Montélimar-2
- Intercommunality: Montélimar Agglomération

Government
  - Mayor (2020–2026): Bruno Almoric
- Area^{1}: 9.8 km^{2} (3.8 sq mi)
- Elevation: 115 m (377 ft)
- Highest elevation: 170 m (560 ft)
- Lowest elevation: 96 m (315 ft)
- Population (2023): 2,592
  - Density: 260/km^{2} (690/sq mi)
- Time zone: UTC+01:00 (CET)
  - Summer (DST): UTC+02:00 (CEST)
- INSEE/Postal code: 26191 /26740
- ^{1} French Land Register data, which excludes lakes, ponds, glaciers > 1 km^{2} (0.386 sq mi or 247 acres) and river estuaries.

Montboucher-sur-Jabron (French pronunciation: [mɔ̃buʃe syʁ ʒabʁɔ̃]; Occitan: Montboschier) is a commune in the Drôme department in southeastern France.

== Population ==
Historical population
Year	Pop.	±% p.a.
1968	667	—
1975	693	+0.55%
1982	1,042	+6.00%
1990	1,278	+2.58%
1999	1,424	+1.21%
2007	1,844	+3.28%
2012	2,209	+3.68%
2017	2,285	+0.68%
2023	2,592	+2.12%
Source: INSEE

== See also ==
- Communes of the Drôme department
