= Maurice Savin =

French painter

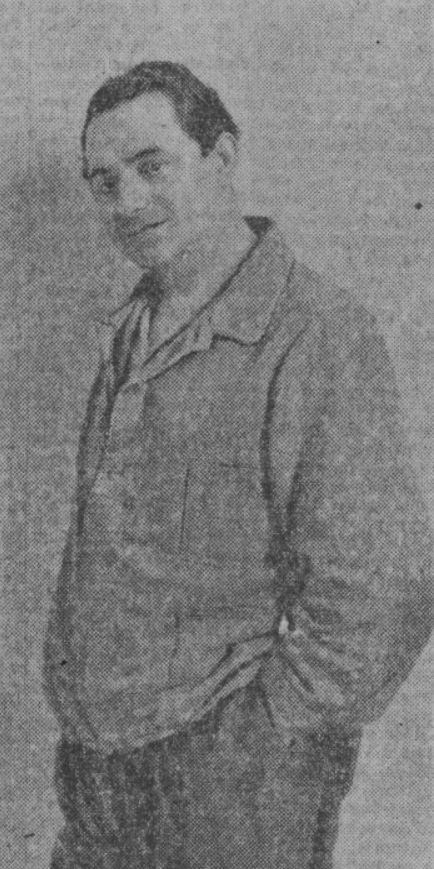
- in Comœdia 1943.
- Born: Maurice Louis Savin; October 17, 1894; Moras, Drôme, France
- Died: 1973; Paris
- Known for: Painting

Maurice Savin (born Maurice Louis Savin; 17 October 1894 – 1973), was a French artist, painter, ceramicist and tapestry-maker his works are included in many private and public collections.

== Biography ==
Maurice Savin was born in the Drôme in south-eastern France. He studied art before being conscripted into the French military in 1914. He was wounded twice, during World War I, being awarded the Croix de Guerre.

After the war, Savin worked for various magazines and journals as an illustrator, during this period he continued to paint and had exhibitions in Paris at, for example, the Salon d’Automne. In 1933, he began working in ceramics, producing a mural for the Hôtel de Ville in Montélimar in 1936.
