= Saulce-sur-Rhône =

- Commune
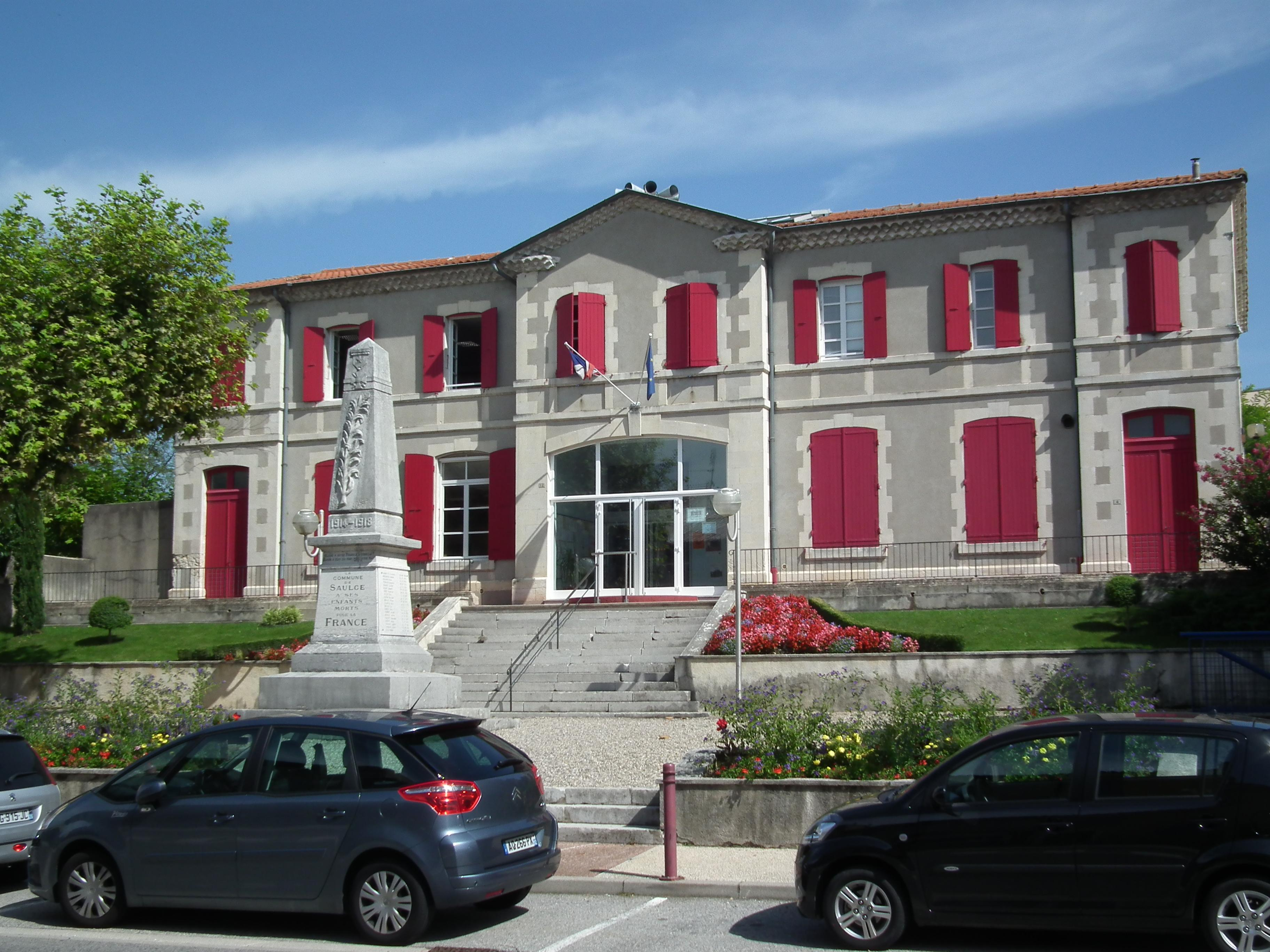
- The town hall in Saulce-sur-Rhône

- Coat of arms
- Location of Saulce-sur-Rhône
- Location within France Location within Auvergne-Rhône-Alpes
- Coordinates: 44°42′14″N 4°47′56″E
- Country: France
- Region: Auvergne-Rhône-Alpes
- Department: Drôme
- Arrondissement: Nyons
- Canton: Montélimar-1
- Intercommunality: Montélimar Agglomération

Government
  - Mayor (2022–2026): Stephane Vargas
- Area^{1}: 18.43 km^{2} (7.12 sq mi)
- Elevation: 90 m (300 ft)
- Highest elevation: 161 m (528 ft)
- Lowest elevation: 76 m (249 ft)
- Population (2023): 1,892
  - Density: 102.7/km^{2} (265.9/sq mi)
- Time zone: UTC+01:00 (CET)
  - Summer (DST): UTC+02:00 (CEST)
- INSEE/Postal code: 26337 /26270
- ^{1} French Land Register data, which excludes lakes, ponds, glaciers > 1 km^{2} (0.386 sq mi or 247 acres) and river estuaries.

Saulce-sur-Rhône (French pronunciation: [sols syʁ ʁon], literally Saulce on Rhône; Occitan: Saussa) is a commune in the Drôme department in southeastern France.

== Population ==
Historical population
Year	Pop.	±% p.a.
1968	1,125	—
1975	1,199	+0.91%
1982	1,210	+0.13%
1990	1,443	+2.23%
1999	1,613	+1.25%
2007	1,673	+0.46%
2012	1,826	+1.77%
2017	1,855	+0.32%
2023	1,892	+0.33%
Source: INSEE

== See also ==
- Communes of the Drôme department
