= Bonlieu-sur-Roubion =

- Commune
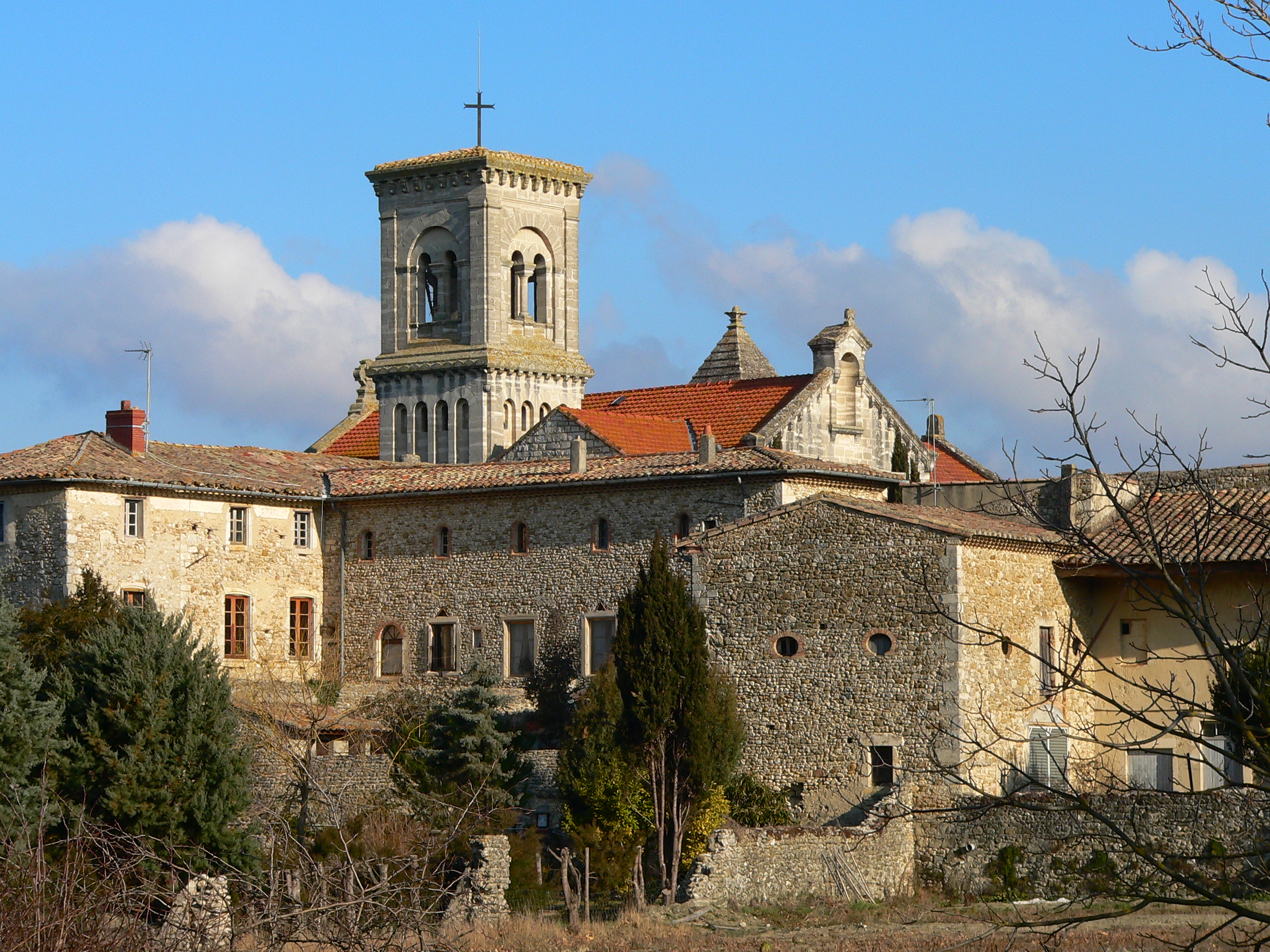
- The abbey of Saint-Anne in Bonlieu-sur-Roubion

- Coat of arms
- Location of Bonlieu-sur-Roubion
- Location within France Location within Auvergne-Rhône-Alpes
- Coordinates: 44°35′43″N 4°52′56″E
- Country: France
- Region: Auvergne-Rhône-Alpes
- Department: Drôme
- Arrondissement: Nyons
- Canton: Dieulefit
- Intercommunality: Montélimar Agglomération

Government
  - Mayor (2020–2026): Allain Dorlhiac
- Area^{1}: 6.05 km^{2} (2.34 sq mi)
- Highest elevation: 212 m (696 ft)
- Lowest elevation: 130 m (430 ft)
- Population (2023): 458
  - Density: 75.7/km^{2} (196/sq mi)
- Time zone: UTC+01:00 (CET)
  - Summer (DST): UTC+02:00 (CEST)
- INSEE/Postal code: 26052 /26160
- ^{1} French Land Register data, which excludes lakes, ponds, glaciers > 1 km^{2} (0.386 sq mi or 247 acres) and river estuaries.

Bonlieu-sur-Roubion (French pronunciation: [bɔ̃ljø syʁ ʁubjɔ̃]) is a commune in the Drôme department in southeastern France.

== Population ==
Historical population
Year	Pop.	±% p.a.
1968	170	—
1975	144	−2.34%
1982	221	+6.31%
1990	286	+3.28%
1999	378	+3.15%
2007	382	+0.13%
2012	373	−0.48%
2017	469	+4.69%
2023	458	−0.39%
Source: INSEE

== See also ==
- Communes of the Drôme department
