= Châteauneuf-du-Rhône =

Châteauneuf-du-Rhône Chastelnòu del Ròse (Occitan)
- Commune
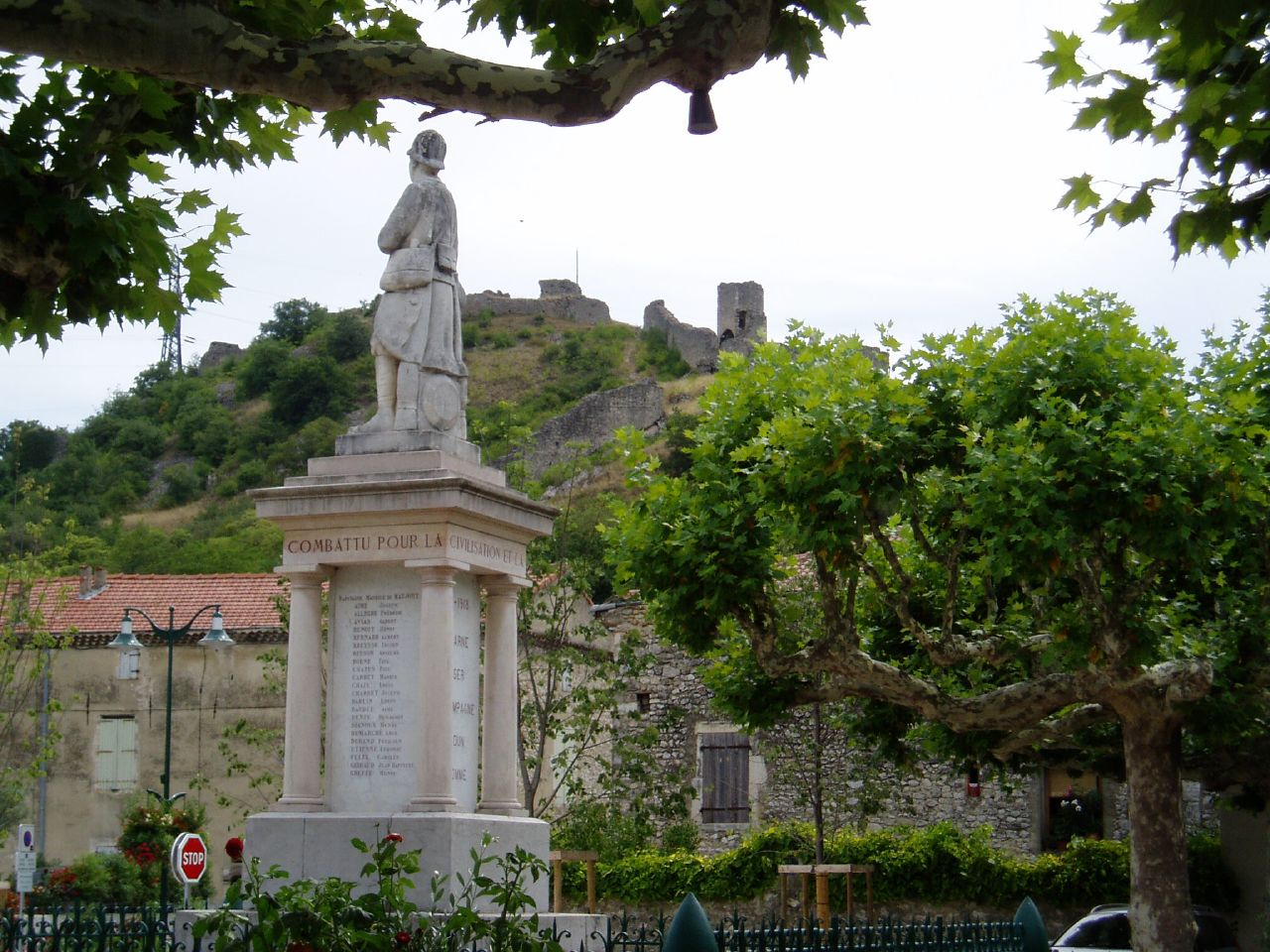
- Monument in Châteauneuf-du-Rhône

- Coat of arms
- Location of Châteauneuf-du-Rhône
- Location within France Location within Auvergne-Rhône-Alpes
- Coordinates: 44°29′12″N 4°43′02″E
- Country: France
- Region: Auvergne-Rhône-Alpes
- Department: Drôme
- Arrondissement: Nyons
- Canton: Montélimar-2
- Intercommunality: Montélimar Agglomération

Government
  - Mayor (2020–2026): Marielle Figuet
- Area^{1}: 27.27 km^{2} (10.53 sq mi)
- Highest elevation: 335 m (1,099 ft)
- Lowest elevation: 55 m (180 ft)
- Population (2023): 2,917
  - Density: 107.0/km^{2} (277.0/sq mi)
- Time zone: UTC+01:00 (CET)
  - Summer (DST): UTC+02:00 (CEST)
- INSEE/Postal code: 26085 /26780
- ^{1} French Land Register data, which excludes lakes, ponds, glaciers > 1 km^{2} (0.386 sq mi or 247 acres) and river estuaries.

Châteauneuf-du-Rhône (French: [ʃɑtonœf dy ʁon]; Occitan: Chastelnòu del Ròse) is a commune in the Drôme department in southeastern France.

== Population ==
Historical population
Year	Pop.	±% p.a.
1968	1,484	—
1975	1,654	+1.56%
1982	1,977	+2.58%
1990	2,094	+0.72%
1999	2,220	+0.65%
2007	2,236	+0.09%
2012	2,503	+2.28%
2017	2,725	+1.71%
2023	2,917	+1.14%
Source: INSEE

== See also ==
- Communes of the Drôme department
