= Espeluche =

- Commune
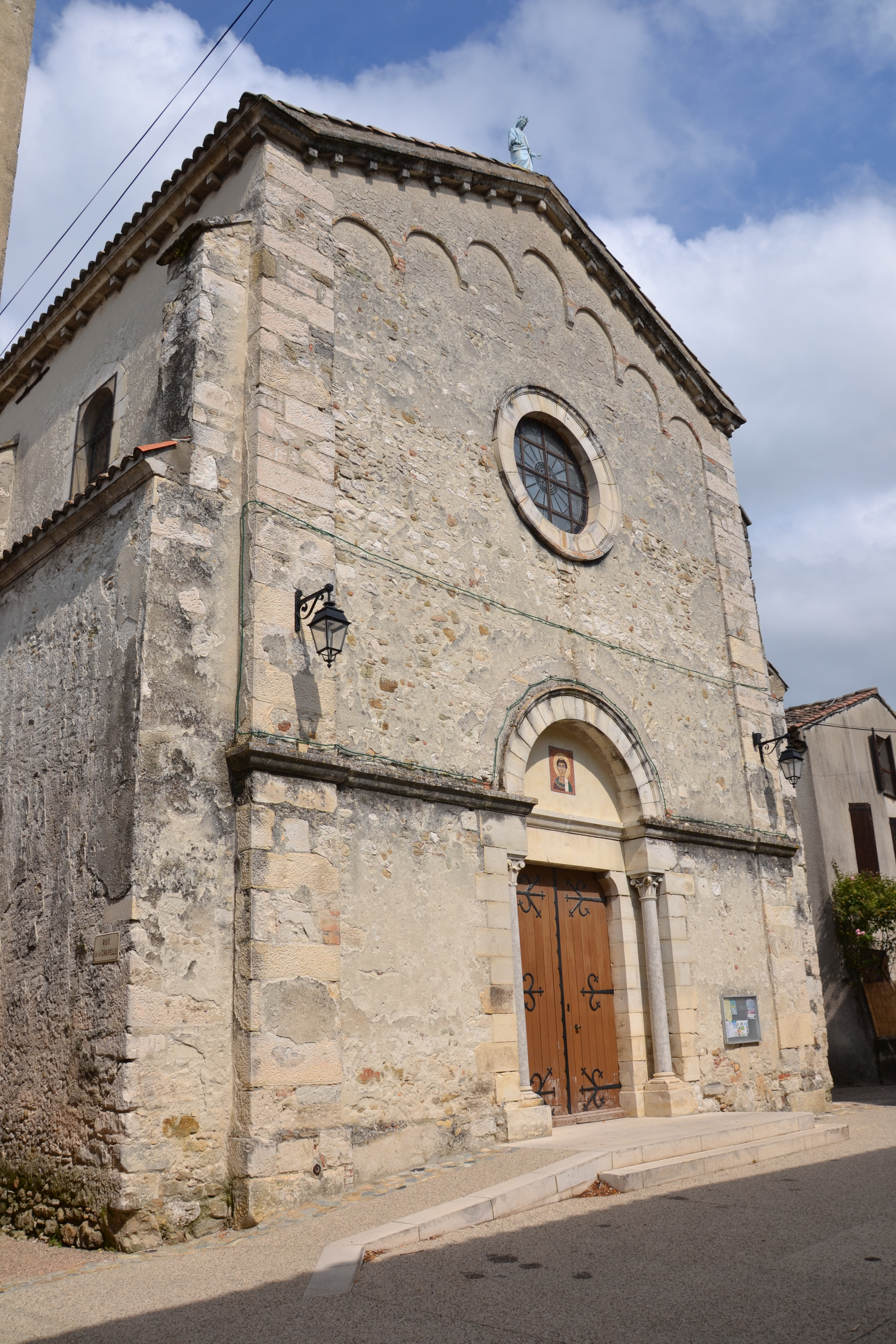
- The church in Espeluche
- Location of Espeluche
- Location within France Location within Auvergne-Rhône-Alpes
- Coordinates: 44°31′01″N 4°49′26″E
- Country: France
- Region: Auvergne-Rhône-Alpes
- Department: Drôme
- Arrondissement: Nyons
- Canton: Montélimar-2
- Intercommunality: Montélimar Agglomération

Government
  - Mayor (2020–2026): Marie-Pierre Piallat
- Area^{1}: 11.33 km^{2} (4.37 sq mi)
- Highest elevation: 425 m (1,394 ft)
- Lowest elevation: 106 m (348 ft)
- Population (2023): 1,134
  - Density: 100.1/km^{2} (259.2/sq mi)
- Time zone: UTC+01:00 (CET)
  - Summer (DST): UTC+02:00 (CEST)
- INSEE/Postal code: 26121 /26780
- ^{1} French Land Register data, which excludes lakes, ponds, glaciers > 1 km^{2} (0.386 sq mi or 247 acres) and river estuaries.

Espeluche (French pronunciation: [ɛspəlyʃ]; Occitan: Espelucha) is a commune in the Drôme department in the Auvergne-Rhône-Alpes region in southeastern France.

== Population ==
Historical population
Year	Pop.	±% p.a.
1968	412	—
1975	489	+2.48%
1982	626	+3.59%
1990	700	+1.41%
1999	752	+0.80%
2007	1,057	+4.35%
2012	1,037	−0.38%
2017	1,064	+0.52%
2023	1,134	+1.07%
Source: INSEE

== See also ==
- Communes of the Drôme department
