= Puygiron =

- Commune
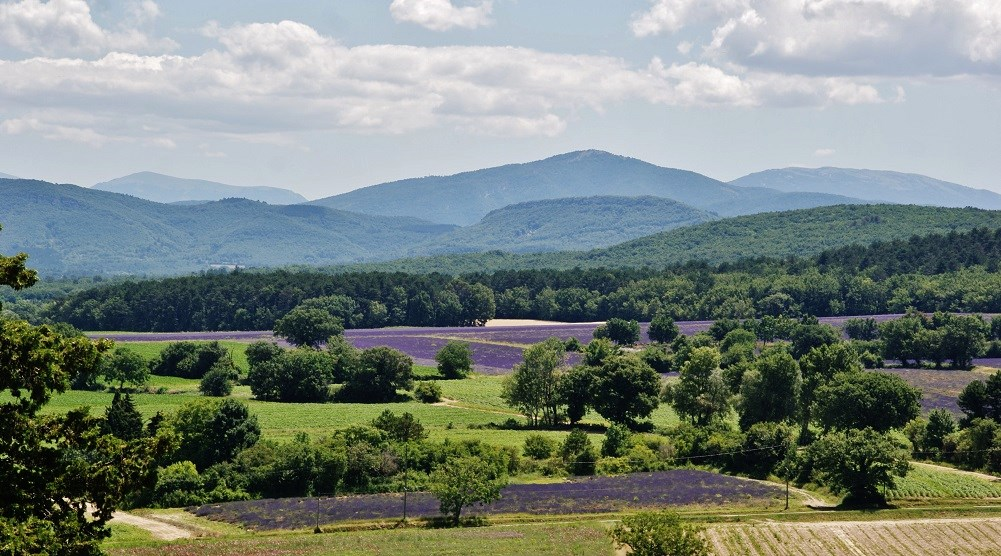
- Puygiron and its fields of lavender
- Location of Puygiron
- Location within France Location within Auvergne-Rhône-Alpes
- Coordinates: 44°32′33″N 4°50′56″E
- Country: France
- Region: Auvergne-Rhône-Alpes
- Department: Drôme
- Arrondissement: Nyons
- Canton: Dieulefit
- Intercommunality: Montélimar Agglomération

Government
  - Mayor (2020–2026): Régina Campello
- Area^{1}: 6.68 km^{2} (2.58 sq mi)
- Highest elevation: 292 m (958 ft)
- Lowest elevation: 114 m (374 ft)
- Population (2023): 431
  - Density: 64.5/km^{2} (167/sq mi)
- Time zone: UTC+01:00 (CET)
  - Summer (DST): UTC+02:00 (CEST)
- INSEE/Postal code: 26257 /26160
- ^{1} French Land Register data, which excludes lakes, ponds, glaciers > 1 km^{2} (0.386 sq mi or 247 acres) and river estuaries.

Puygiron (French pronunciation: [pɥiʒiʁɔ̃]; Occitan: Puegiron) is a commune in the Drôme department in southeastern France.

== Population ==
Historical population
Year	Pop.	±% p.a.
1968	191	—
1975	275	+5.35%
1982	293	+0.91%
1990	315	+0.91%
1999	347	+1.08%
2007	414	+2.23%
2012	422	+0.38%
2017	433	+0.52%
2023	431	−0.08%
Source: INSEE

== See also ==
- Communes of the Drôme department
