= International Center of Parapsychology and Scientific Research of the New Age =

Religious movement in France from 1989 to 1997

International Center of Parapsychology and the Scientific Research of the New Age
- Formation: 1989
- Type: New religious movement
- Headquarters: La Coucourde, France
- Official language: French
- Key people: Marie-Thérèse Castano

The International Center of Parapsychology and Scientific Research of the New Age, generally known under the name of Horus (in reference to falcon-god Horus which was the emblem of the group), was a New Age-oriented new religious movement founded in France in 1989 by Marie-Thérèse Castano, and ended in April 1997. This group had about 300 members. The community of the group was located in La Coucourde, in the Drôme department. In the 1990s, the group was often the subject of strong criticisms in the media, as former members and a 1995 report established by the Parliamentary Commission on Cults in France presented it as a cult. In 1997, the founder and several followers were sentenced to prison on grounds of duty to rescue, complicity in forgery and unauthorized practice of medicine. However, the group considered to be a victim of defamation and expressed its complaints particularly through its lawyer.

== History and doctrines ==
The movement was founded in 1989 by Marie-Thérèse Castano (born 1945), who was widely called Maïté. She is a former trader and real estate broker who achieved some notability in the 1980s hosting a radio program about esotericism and occultism. Later, she organized conferences in which she talked about pacifism, ecology, alternative medicine, personal development, and astrology. With people who shared her opinions, she decided to found a community in La Coucourde, Drôme, which gathered approximately 100 people and some children. Created in 1992, this 40-hectare ecological farm lived in autarky. Members produced their own fruits, vegetables, cheeses, milk and raised livestock, then sold them on the market.

Affirming to be in relation with higher entities, Castano said to be the reincarnation of Nefertiti. The doctrine of the group, mainly related to ecology and New Age, focused on meditation, study of Egyptian civilization, cosmic energies, astrology and telepathy. The group claimed to be able to get giant fruits and vegetables without fertilizers. Some members refused vaccinations for their children. The community's purpose was the scientific research in parapsychology and the knowledge of the laws of the nature.

In 1997, Castano publicly announced the break-up of the community.

== Reception ==
The media criticized the group mainly on allegations of despoilment, paranoia, loss of critical thought, family breakdown, abandonment of medical treatments, refusal of vaccinations and school attendance for children. The group was also criticized for its challenge of the basic concepts of scientific medicine and false certificates of vaccination. The doctrine was sometimes considered as a potential source of nervous breakdown and attempted suicide.

In France, the group was eventually classified as a cult in the 1995 parliamentary report. In 1997, the Belgian parliamentary commission established a list of 189 movements containing the Horus community.

After the death of two women of 82 and 54 years old respectively in July 1994 and in January 1995, Castano was indicted and jailed on 20 June 1997 for duty to rescue and illegal practice of medicine (the two dead bodies were transported to their villages where deaths were reported, then the bodies cremated). In 1998, a couple was indicted after refusing medical care for their young child, and a doctor was expelled from the General Medical Council for having issued a false certificate of vaccination. On 30 March 1999, the Tribunal correctionnel de Valence, as well as on 7 July 1999, the Court d'Appel de Grenoble, sentenced Castano and several followers to fines and prison.

== Responses to criticisms ==
These accusations were rejected by the group. After a highly critical documentary broadcast on France 2 on 4 January 1996 in Envoyé spécial, members stated that the journalist had belonged to the community for two years, then accepted to produce a such documentary for 600,000 francs because of financial difficulties. Members considered they were victims of conspiracy to disclose their discoveries in agriculture, which would justify their alleged persecution, including arsons and animals killed. For example, in 1996, a teacher follower was revoked by the Ministère de l'Éducation Nationale for fear of proselytism, but in 1998 the Tribunal Administratif de Grenoble nullified this decision. After complaints by the Éducation Nationale on the grounds of inadequate education, children were subject of a special watch by the judge of Valencia, which was perceived as offensive by community's members. For her part, Castano said she did not practice medicine and did not create a school within the community.

In his 1999 book entitled Les radis de la colère - Le complot démasqué, pourquoi la France a-t-elle peur d'Horus?, Horus' lawyer Jean-Pierre Joseph, rejected these accusations. Although he was just the lawyer of several members of the group, Christian Paturel also denied these criticisms and presented the group as an "agrarian community".
