= La Coucourde =

- Commune
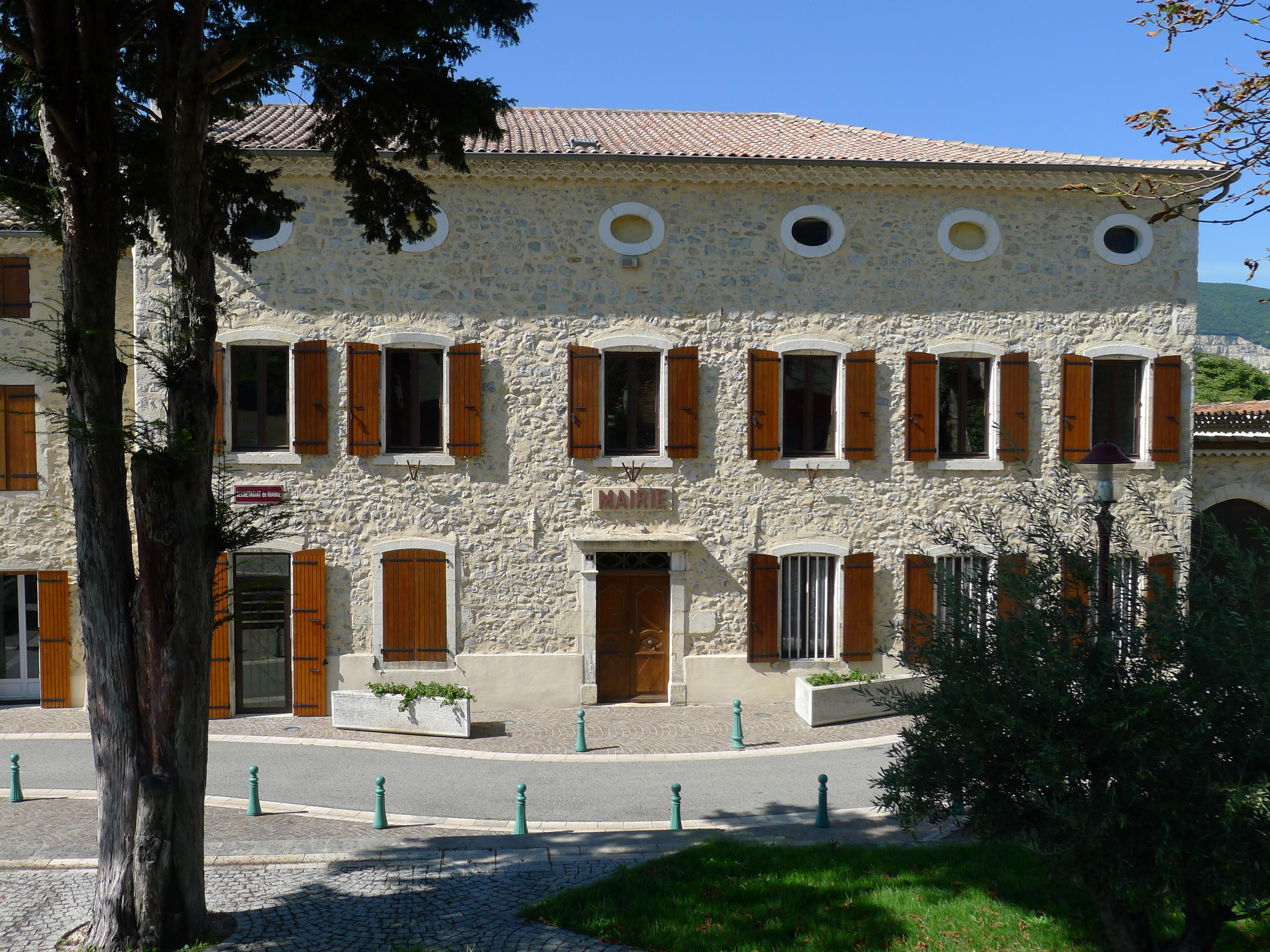
- The town hall in La Coucourde

- Coat of arms
- Location of La Coucourde
- Location within France Location within Auvergne-Rhône-Alpes
- Coordinates: 44°39′05″N 4°47′03″E
- Country: France
- Region: Auvergne-Rhône-Alpes
- Department: Drôme
- Arrondissement: Nyons
- Canton: Montélimar-1
- Intercommunality: Montélimar Agglomération

Government
  - Mayor (2020–2026): Jean-Luc Zanon
- Area^{1}: 11.15 km^{2} (4.31 sq mi)
- Highest elevation: 395 m (1,296 ft)
- Lowest elevation: 71 m (233 ft)
- Population (2023): 1,240
  - Density: 111/km^{2} (288/sq mi)
- Time zone: UTC+01:00 (CET)
  - Summer (DST): UTC+02:00 (CEST)
- INSEE/Postal code: 26106 /26740
- ^{1} French Land Register data, which excludes lakes, ponds, glaciers > 1 km^{2} (0.386 sq mi or 247 acres) and river estuaries.

La Coucourde (French pronunciation: [la kukuʁd]; Occitan: La Cogorda) is a commune in the Drôme department in southeastern France. It housed the Horus community until 1997.

== Population ==
Historical population
Year	Pop.	±% p.a.
1968	522	—
1975	470	−1.49%
1982	563	+2.61%
1990	687	+2.52%
1999	749	+0.96%
2007	918	+2.58%
2012	1,008	+1.89%
2017	1,071	+1.22%
2023	1,240	+2.47%
Source: INSEE

== See also ==
- Communes of the Drôme department
