= Rochefort-en-Valdaine =

- Commune
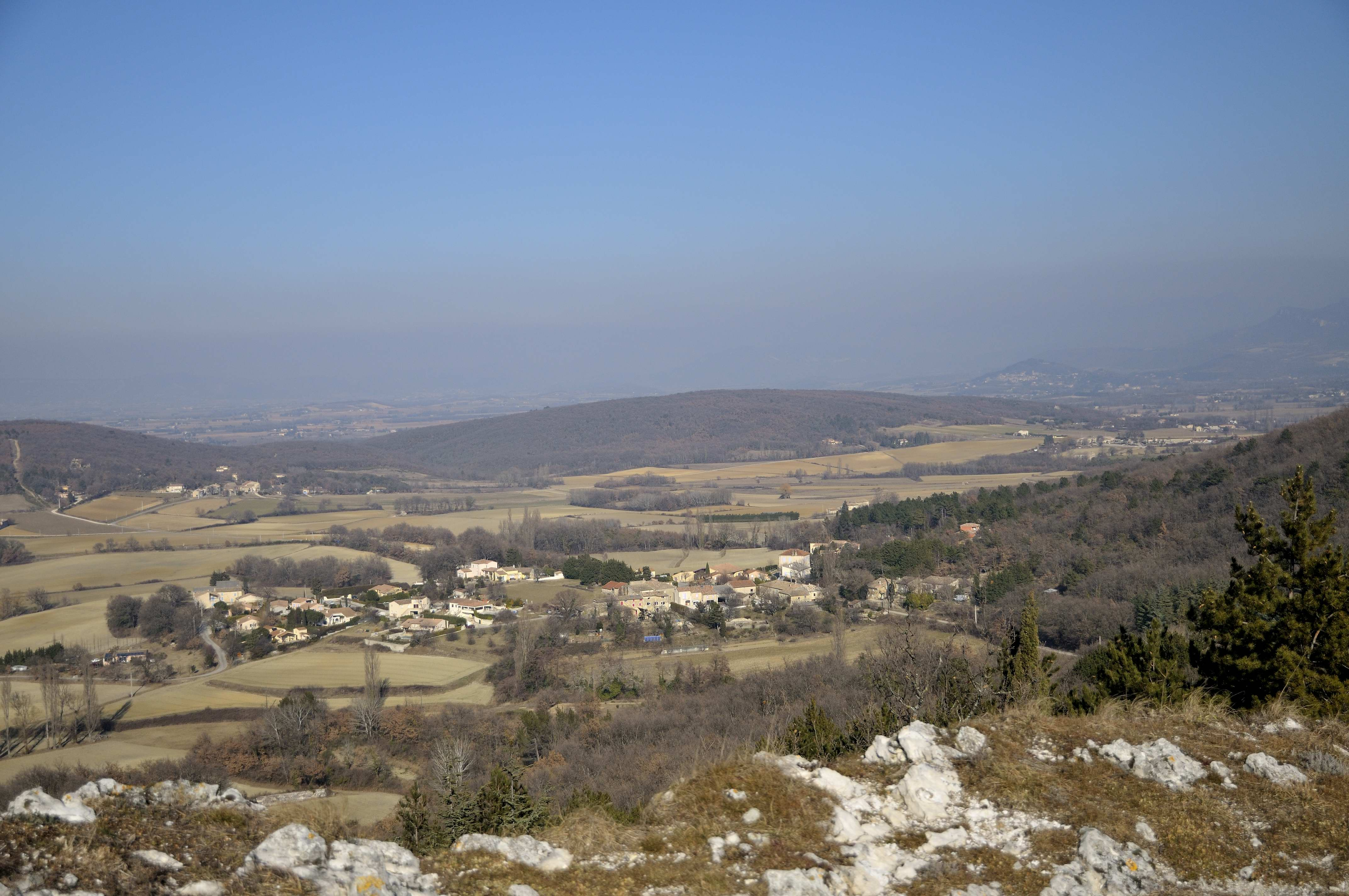
- A general view of Rochefort-en-Valdaine
- Location of Rochefort-en-Valdaine
- Location within France Location within Auvergne-Rhône-Alpes
- Coordinates: 44°30′59″N 4°51′40″E
- Country: France
- Region: Auvergne-Rhône-Alpes
- Department: Drôme
- Arrondissement: Nyons
- Canton: Dieulefit
- Intercommunality: Montélimar Agglomération

Government
  - Mayor (2020–2026): Christel Falcone
- Area^{1}: 12.8 km^{2} (4.9 sq mi)
- Elevation: 290 m (950 ft)
- Highest elevation: 446 m (1,463 ft)
- Lowest elevation: 165 m (541 ft)
- Population (2023): 353
  - Density: 27.6/km^{2} (71.4/sq mi)
- Time zone: UTC+01:00 (CET)
  - Summer (DST): UTC+02:00 (CEST)
- INSEE/Postal code: 26272 /26160
- ^{1} French Land Register data, which excludes lakes, ponds, glaciers > 1 km^{2} (0.386 sq mi or 247 acres) and river estuaries.

Rochefort-en-Valdaine (Occitan: Ròchefort) is a commune in the Drôme department in southeastern France.

== Population ==
Historical population
Year	Pop.	±% p.a.
1968	171	—
1975	191	+1.59%
1982	211	+1.43%
1990	258	+2.55%
1999	304	+1.84%
2007	343	+1.52%
2012	352	+0.52%
2017	355	+0.17%
2023	353	−0.09%
Source: INSEE

== See also ==
- Communes of the Drôme department
