= Manas, Drôme =

Manas
- Commune
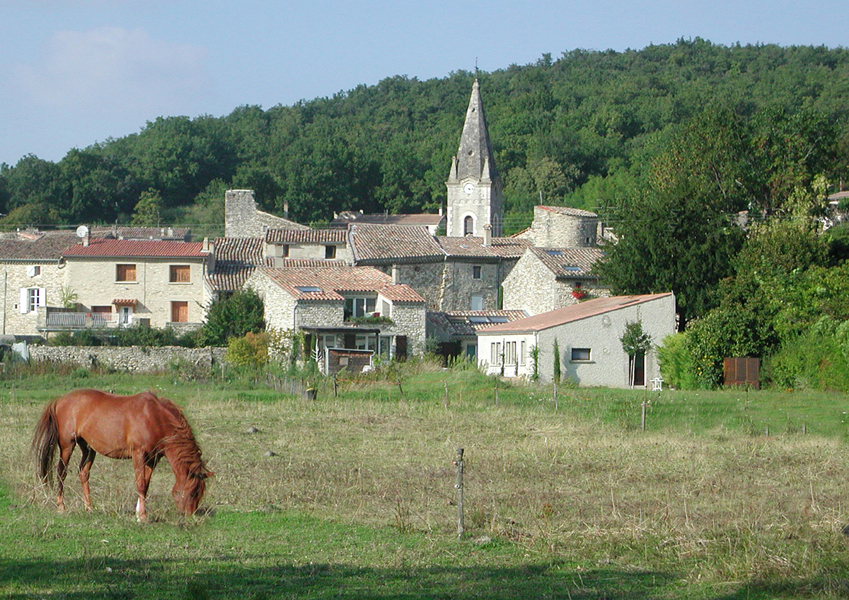
- A general view of Manas
- Location of Manas
- Location within France Location within Auvergne-Rhône-Alpes
- Coordinates: 44°36′01″N 4°59′06″E
- Country: France
- Region: Auvergne-Rhône-Alpes
- Department: Drôme
- Arrondissement: Nyons
- Canton: Dieulefit
- Intercommunality: Montélimar Agglomération

Government
  - Mayor (2020–2026): Florence Merlet
- Area^{1}: 1.91 km^{2} (0.74 sq mi)
- Highest elevation: 370 m (1,210 ft)
- Lowest elevation: 204 m (669 ft)
- Population (2023): 180
  - Density: 94/km^{2} (240/sq mi)
- Time zone: UTC+01:00 (CET)
  - Summer (DST): UTC+02:00 (CEST)
- INSEE/Postal code: 26171 /26160
- ^{1} French Land Register data, which excludes lakes, ponds, glaciers > 1 km^{2} (0.386 sq mi or 247 acres) and river estuaries.

Manas is a commune in the Drôme department in southeastern France

== Population ==
Historical population
| Year | Pop. | ±% p.a. |
|---|---|---|
| 1968 | 85 | — |
| 1975 | 90 | +0.82% |
| 1982 | 101 | +1.66% |
| 1990 | 137 | +3.88% |
| 1999 | 134 | −0.25% |
| 2007 | 169 | +2.94% |
| 2012 | 188 | +2.15% |
| 2017 | 194 | +0.63% |
| 2023 | 180 | −1.24% |
Source: INSEE

== See also ==
- Communes of the Drôme department
