= Jean-Joseph Menuret =

French physician and author (1739-1815)

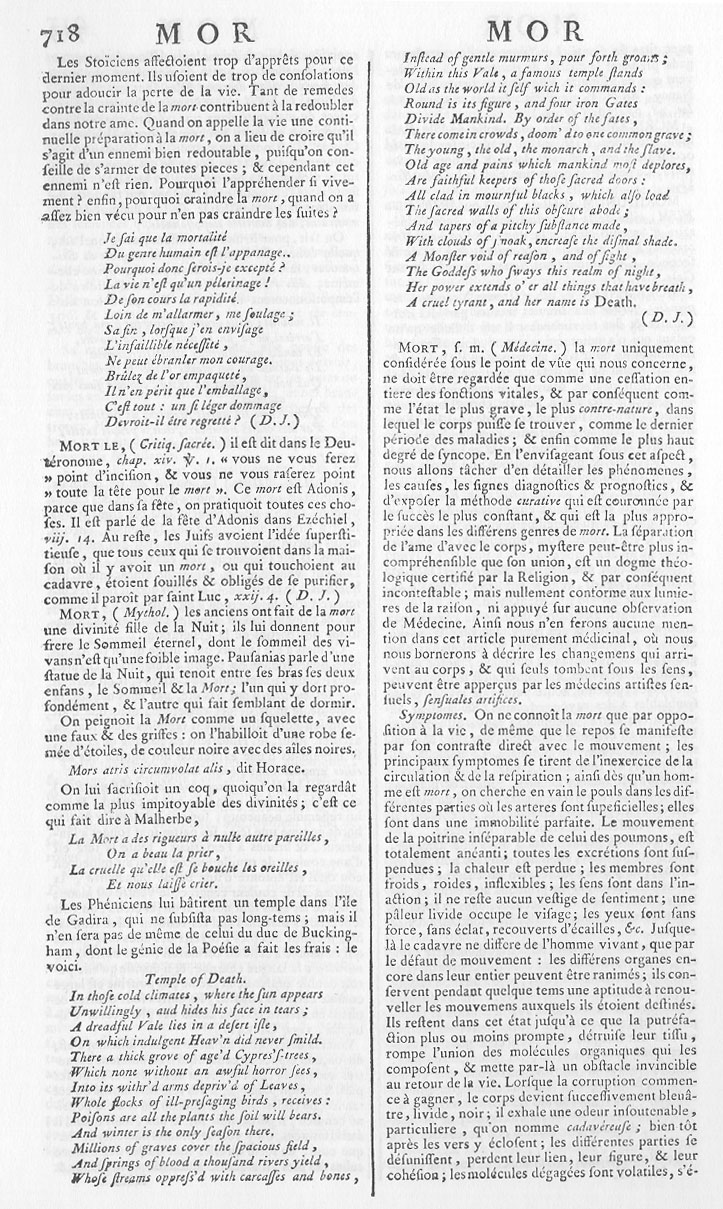
- First column of the article Mort (death) in the Encyclopédie
- Born: 23 January 1739; Montélimar
- Died: 15 December 1815 (aged 76); Paris
- Occupations: Physician; Encyclopédiste
- Spouses: Louise Cartier de Boismartin; Marie-Elisabeth Monneron

Jean-Joseph Menuret, called Menuret de Chambaud (French: [ʒɑ̃ ʒozɛf mənʁɛ]; 23 January 1739 – 15 December 1815) was a French physician and author of a number of medical treatises. He also contributed to the Encyclopédie by Diderot and d'Alembert.

== Biography ==
Menuret studied medicine at the University of Montpellier with Antoine Fizes. Returned to practise in Montelimar after he obtained his doctorate, he published a number of books and nearly 80 articles in the Encyclopedia by Diderot.

He then went to Paris and became physician of the king's stables and doctor of the Countess of Artois.

He became an émigré at the Revolution and settled in Hamburg. He returned to Paris after the Coup of 18 Brumaire.

== Family ==
Menuret's first marriage with Louise Cartier de Bois Martin from Valence remained childless. After Cartier died in 1773, Menuret married Marie-Elisabeth Monneron (born 1745), daughter of Antoine Claude Monneron (1703–1791), a tax farmer of Annonay, Ardèche and Augustin Monneron's sister. They had one son, André Menuret – who remained single – and two daughters, Joséphine Menuret and Alexandre Menuret.

== Works ==
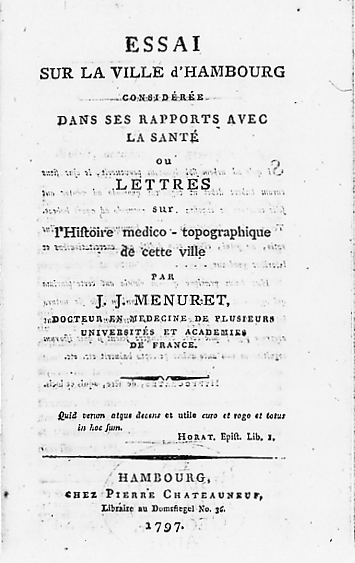
Title page of the Essai sur la ville de Hambourg by Menuret.

- 1767: Nouveau traité du pouls, Amsterdam (Paris), in-12°
- 1770: Avis aux mères sur la petite vérole et la rougeole, ou Lettres à madame de *** sur la manière de traiter et de gouverner ses enfants dans ces maladies; suivies d’une question proposée à Messieurs de la Société royale des sciences de Montpellier, relativement à l’inoculation, Lyon, in-8°
- 1777: Éloge historique de M. Venel, médecin, Grenoble, in-8°
- 1781: Essai sur l’action de l’air dans les maladies contagieuses, qui a remporté le prix proposé par la Société royale de Médecine, Paris : rue et hôtel Serpente, in-12°, XXIV-112 p.; translated into German (Leipzig, 1784, in-8°)
- 1786: Essai sur l’histoire médico-topographique de Paris, Paris, in-12; New edition, augmentée de quelques lettres sur différents sujets, Paris, 1804 in-8°
- 1790 or 1791: Mémoire sur la culture des jachères [couronné par la Société d’agriculture de Paris en 1789], Paris : Impr. de Ph.-D. Pierres, et chez Belin, in-8°, 61 p.
- 1790: Observations sur le débit du sel après la suppression de la gabelle, relatives à la santé et à l’intérêt des citoyens, in-8°
- 1791: Essai sur les moyens de former de bons médecins, sur les obligations réciproques des médecins et de la société; partie d’un projet d’éducation national relative à cette profession, Paris, in-8°; édition revue et augmentée de quelques notes relatives aux changements survenus dans cette partie depuis la première, en 1791, Paris, 1814, in-8°
- 1797: Essai sur la ville de Hambourg, considérée dans ses rapports avec la santé, ou Lettres sur l’histoire médico-topographique de cette ville, Hambourg, in-8°
- 1809: Discours sur la réunion de l’utile à l’agréable, même en médecine; lu à la séance publique de la Société philotechnique, Paris, in-8°

== Articles in the Encyclopédie (selection) ==
- Articles Inflammation, Maladies inflammatoires, vol. 8, (p. 708–27);
- Article Mort (médecine), vol. 10, (p. 718–27);
- Article Pouls, vol. 13, (p. 205–40);
- Article « Somnambule, & Somnambulisme », vol. 15,(p. 340–2).

== Sources ==
- Jean-Eugène Dezeimeris, Dictionnaire historique de la médecine ancienne et moderne, t. 3, p. 2, Bruxelles : Béchet jeune, 1837, (p. 567–8).
- Adolphe Rochas, Biographie du Dauphiné, v. 2, Paris : Charavay, 1860, (p. 139–40).
- Colas Duflo, « Diderot et Ménuret de Chambaud », Recherches sur Diderot et sur l'Encyclopédie, issue 34 : Le Rêve de D'Alembert.
