= Ancône =

- Commune
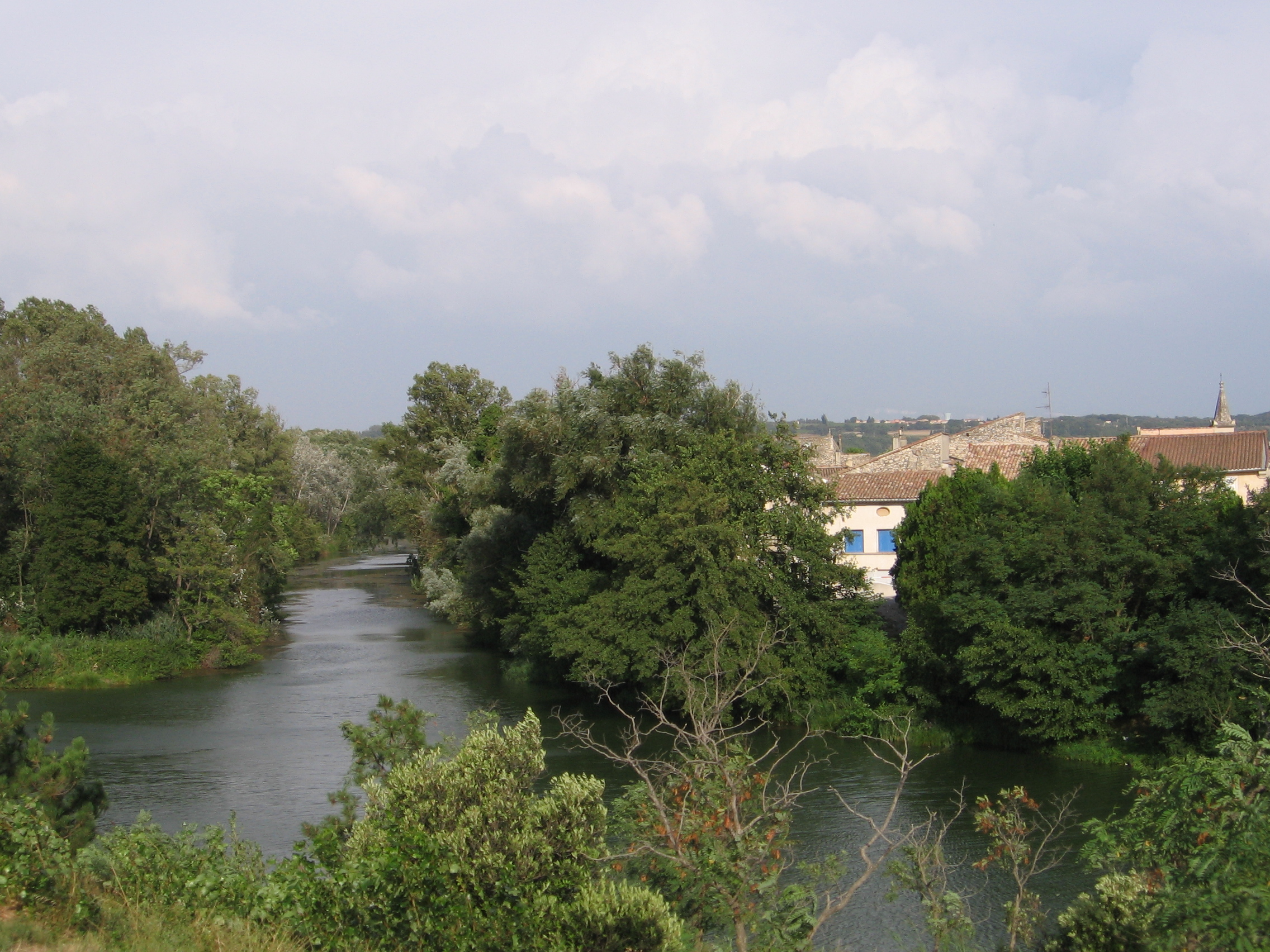
- The river in Ancône

- Coat of arms
- Location of Ancône
- Location within France Location within Auvergne-Rhône-Alpes
- Coordinates: 44°34′57″N 4°43′42″E
- Country: France
- Region: Auvergne-Rhône-Alpes
- Department: Drôme
- Arrondissement: Nyons
- Canton: Montélimar-1
- Intercommunality: Montélimar Agglomération

Government
  - Mayor (2020–2026): Christophe Féret
- Area^{1}: 1.59 km^{2} (0.61 sq mi)
- Highest elevation: 76 m (249 ft)
- Lowest elevation: 58 m (190 ft)
- Population (2023): 1,338
  - Density: 842/km^{2} (2,180/sq mi)
- Time zone: UTC+01:00 (CET)
  - Summer (DST): UTC+02:00 (CEST)
- INSEE/Postal code: 26008 /26200
- ^{1} French Land Register data, which excludes lakes, ponds, glaciers > 1 km^{2} (0.386 sq mi or 247 acres) and river estuaries.

Ancône (French pronunciation: [ɑ̃kon]; Occitan: Ancona) is a commune in the Drôme department in southeastern France.

== Population ==
Historical population
Year	Pop.	±% p.a.
1968	593	—
1975	727	+2.95%
1982	790	+1.19%
1990	899	+1.63%
1999	947	+0.58%
2007	1,028	+1.03%
2012	1,234	+3.72%
2017	1,341	+1.68%
2023	1,338	−0.04%
Source: INSEE

== See also ==
- Communes of the Drôme department
