= Roynac =

- Commune
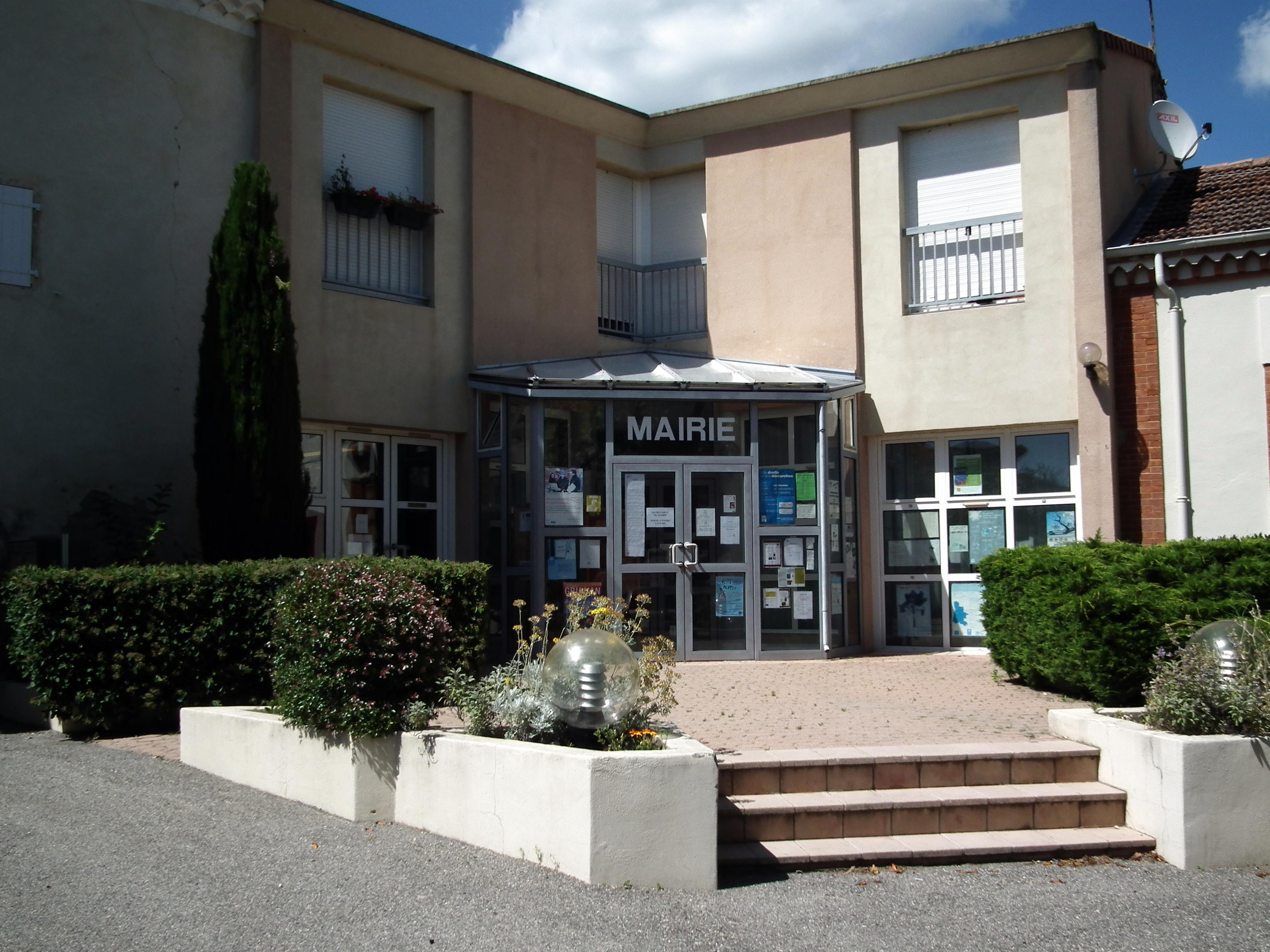
- Town hall
- Location of Roynac
- Location within France Location within Auvergne-Rhône-Alpes
- Coordinates: 44°38′37″N 4°56′26″E
- Country: France
- Region: Auvergne-Rhône-Alpes
- Department: Drôme
- Arrondissement: Nyons
- Canton: Dieulefit
- Intercommunality: Montélimar Agglomération

Government
  - Mayor (2020–2026): Valérie Arnavon
- Area^{1}: 17.06 km^{2} (6.59 sq mi)
- Elevation: 213 m (699 ft)
- Highest elevation: 497 m (1,631 ft)
- Lowest elevation: 159 m (522 ft)
- Population (2023): 477
  - Density: 28.0/km^{2} (72.4/sq mi)
- Time zone: UTC+01:00 (CET)
  - Summer (DST): UTC+02:00 (CEST)
- INSEE/Postal code: 26287 /26450
- ^{1} French Land Register data, which excludes lakes, ponds, glaciers > 1 km^{2} (0.386 sq mi or 247 acres) and river estuaries.

Roynac (French pronunciation: [ʁwanak]; Occitan: Roinac) is a commune in the Drôme department in southeastern France.

== Population ==
Historical population
Year	Pop.	±% p.a.
1968	356	—
1975	338	−0.74%
1982	311	−1.18%
1990	357	+1.74%
1999	415	+1.69%
2007	417	+0.06%
2012	483	+2.98%
2017	486	+0.12%
2023	477	−0.31%
Source: INSEE

== See also ==
- Communes of the Drôme department
