= Savasse =

- Commune
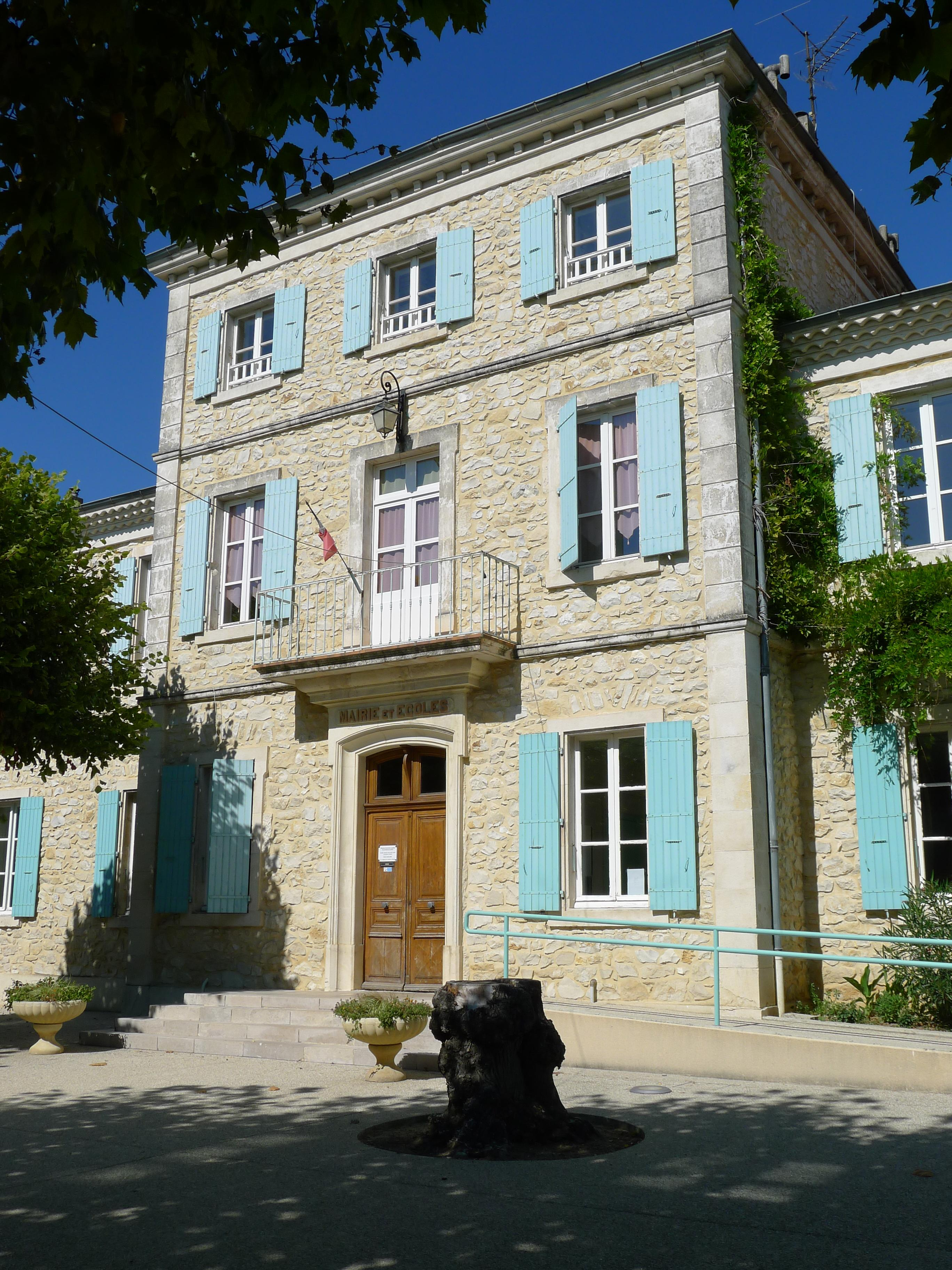
- The town hall in Savasse
- Location of Savasse
- Location within France Location within Auvergne-Rhône-Alpes
- Coordinates: 44°36′00″N 4°46′30″E
- Country: France
- Region: Auvergne-Rhône-Alpes
- Department: Drôme
- Arrondissement: Nyons
- Canton: Montélimar-1
- Intercommunality: Montélimar Agglomération

Government
  - Mayor (2020–2026): Françoise Quenardel
- Area^{1}: 22.01 km^{2} (8.50 sq mi)
- Elevation: 383 m (1,257 ft)
- Highest elevation: 420 m (1,380 ft)
- Lowest elevation: 69 m (226 ft)
- Population (2023): 1,631
  - Density: 74.10/km^{2} (191.9/sq mi)
- Time zone: UTC+01:00 (CET)
  - Summer (DST): UTC+02:00 (CEST)
- INSEE/Postal code: 26339 /26740
- ^{1} French Land Register data, which excludes lakes, ponds, glaciers > 1 km^{2} (0.386 sq mi or 247 acres) and river estuaries.

Savasse (French pronunciation: [savas]; Occitan: Savasse) is a commune in the Drôme department in southeastern France.

== Population ==
Historical population
Year	Pop.	±% p.a.
1968	793	—
1975	829	+0.64%
1982	1,050	+3.43%
1990	1,089	+0.46%
1999	1,093	+0.04%
2007	1,243	+1.62%
2012	1,344	+1.57%
2017	1,444	+1.45%
2023	1,631	+2.05%
Source: INSEE

== See also ==
- Communes of the Drôme department
