= Allan, Drôme =

Allan
- Commune
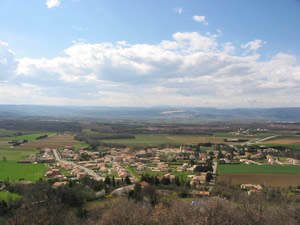
- A general view of Allan
- Location of Allan
- Location within France Location within Auvergne-Rhône-Alpes
- Coordinates: 44°30′00″N 4°47′15″E
- Country: France
- Region: Auvergne-Rhône-Alpes
- Department: Drôme
- Arrondissement: Nyons
- Canton: Montélimar-2
- Intercommunality: Montélimar Agglomération

Government
  - Mayor (2020–2026): Yves Courbis
- Area^{1}: 28.81 km^{2} (11.12 sq mi)
- Highest elevation: 420 m (1,380 ft)
- Lowest elevation: 119 m (390 ft)
- Population (2023): 1,980
  - Density: 68.7/km^{2} (178/sq mi)
- Time zone: UTC+01:00 (CET)
  - Summer (DST): UTC+02:00 (CEST)
- INSEE/Postal code: 26005 /26780
- ^{1} French Land Register data, which excludes lakes, ponds, glaciers > 1 km^{2} (0.386 sq mi or 247 acres) and river estuaries.

Allan (French pronunciation: [alɑ̃]; Occitan: Alan) is a commune in the Drôme department in southeastern France.

== Population ==
Historical population
Year	Pop.	±% p.a.
1968	662	—
1975	865	+3.89%
1982	1,145	+4.09%
1990	1,249	+1.09%
1999	1,385	+1.16%
2007	1,596	+1.79%
2012	1,612	+0.20%
2017	1,727	+1.39%
2023	1,980	+2.30%
Source: INSEE

== See also ==
- Communes of the Drôme department
