= Hôtel de Ville, Montélimar =

Town hall in Montélimar, France

Hôtel de Ville
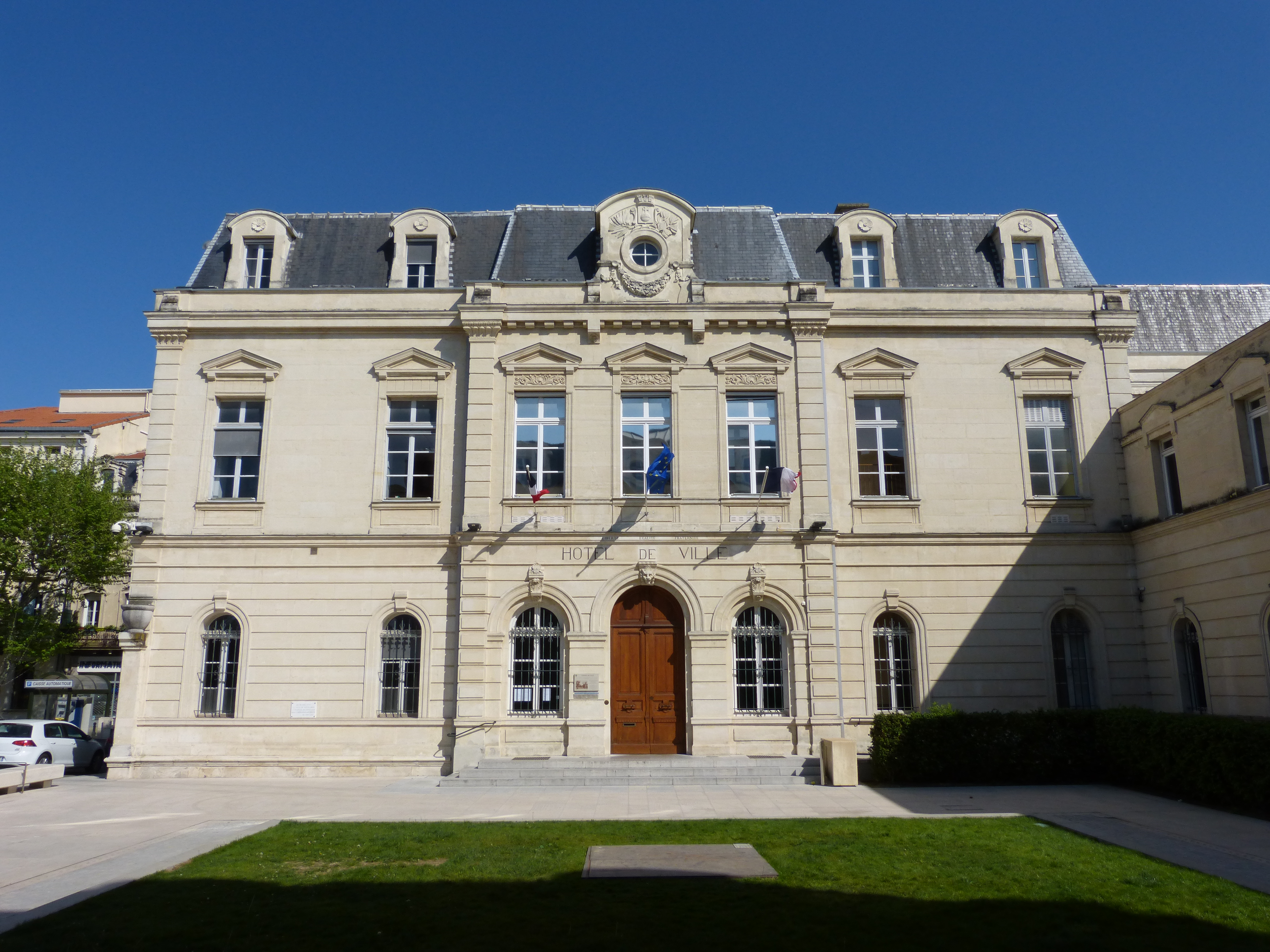
- The main frontage of the Hôtel de Ville in April 2014
- Interactive map of the Hôtel de Ville area

General information
- Type: City hall
- Architectural style: Neoclassical style
- Location: Montélimar, France
- Coordinates: 44.5569°N 4.7497°E
- Completed: 1876

Design and construction
- Architect: François Régis Chaumartin

The Hôtel de Ville (French pronunciation: [otɛl də vil], City Hall) is a municipal building in Montélimar, Drôme, in southeastern France, standing on Place Émile Loubet.

== History ==
Following the French Revolution, the town council held its meetings in the Couvent des Cordeliers (Convent of the Cordeliers). The convent was founded by one of the Adhémar family, whose seat was at Château des Adhémar, in 1226, and was subsequently managed by the Franciscans. A chapel was established in the convent in 1510 and a college was formed there in 1674. After the convent was confiscated by the state as biens nationaux (for the good of the state), the monks were driven out and it was acquired by the council in 1791. It then served as the town hall and the venue for hearings of the local criminal court throughout the first half of the 19th century.

In the mid-19th century, after the former convent became cramped, the council to demolish it and to erect a new building on the site. The work started with the dismantlement of the convent in 1863. The new building was designed by François Régis Chaumartin in the neoclassical style, built in ashlar stone and was officially opened by the mayor, Émile Loubet, on 3 April 1876. The design involved a symmetrical main frontage of seven bays facing onto a small square. The central section of three bays, which was slightly projected forward, featured a round headed doorway with a moulded surround and a keystone, flanked by two round headed windows with moulded surrounds and keystones. The first floor was fenestrated by casement windows with pediments and, at roof level, there was an oculus, which was supported by a garland and surmounted by a coat of arms. The outer bays were fenestrated in a similar style, but with dormer windows at attic level.

A fountain designed by the sculptor, Xavier Gachon, depicting the four seasons of the year, was unveiled in front of the town hall in 1880. Shortly after becoming President of France, Loubet returned to the town and was received at the town hall in April 1899. The grand staircase was decorated with brightly coloured murals painted by the artist, Maurice Savin, in 1936.

Following the liberation of the town by American troops and the French Forces of the Interior on 28 August 1944, a plaque was unveiled inside the town hall to commemorate the event. The President of France, Charles de Gaulle, visited the town hall and met with civic leaders in September 1963, and the Prime Minister of France, Édouard Balladur, was received at the town hall on the occasion of the opening of a new street, Les Allées Provençales, in February 1995.
