= Montélimar Agglomération =

- Communauté d'agglomération
- The community’s logo
- Interactive map of Montélimar Agglomération
- Coordinates: 44°35′N 04°50′E
- Country: France
- Region: Auvergne-Rhône-Alpes
- Department: Drôme
- No. of communes: {{{nbcomm}}}
- Established: 2014
- Area: 381.2 km^{2} (147.2 sq mi)
- Population (2019): 67,520
  - Density: 177.1/km^{2} (458.8/sq mi)
- Website: www.montelimar-agglo.fr

Montélimar Agglomération is the communauté d'agglomération, an intercommunal structure, centred on the city of Montélimar. It is located in the Drôme department, in the Auvergne-Rhône-Alpes region, southeastern France. Created in 2014, its seat is in Montélimar. Its area is 381.2 km^{2}. Its population was 67,520 in 2019, of which 39,818 in Montélimar proper.

== Composition ==
The communauté d'agglomération consists of the following 27 communes:

1. Allan
2. Ancône
3. La Bâtie-Rolland
4. Bonlieu-sur-Roubion
5. Charols
6. Châteauneuf-du-Rhône
7. Cléon-d'Andran
8. Condillac
9. La Coucourde
10. Espeluche
11. La Laupie
12. Manas
13. Marsanne
14. Montboucher-sur-Jabron
15. Montélimar
16. Portes-en-Valdaine
17. Puygiron
18. Puy-Saint-Martin
19. Rochefort-en-Valdaine
20. Roynac
21. Saint-Gervais-sur-Roubion
22. Saint-Marcel-lès-Sauzet
23. Saulce-sur-Rhône
24. Sauzet
25. Savasse
26. La Touche
27. Les Tourrettes
