= Saint-Gervais-sur-Roubion =

- Commune
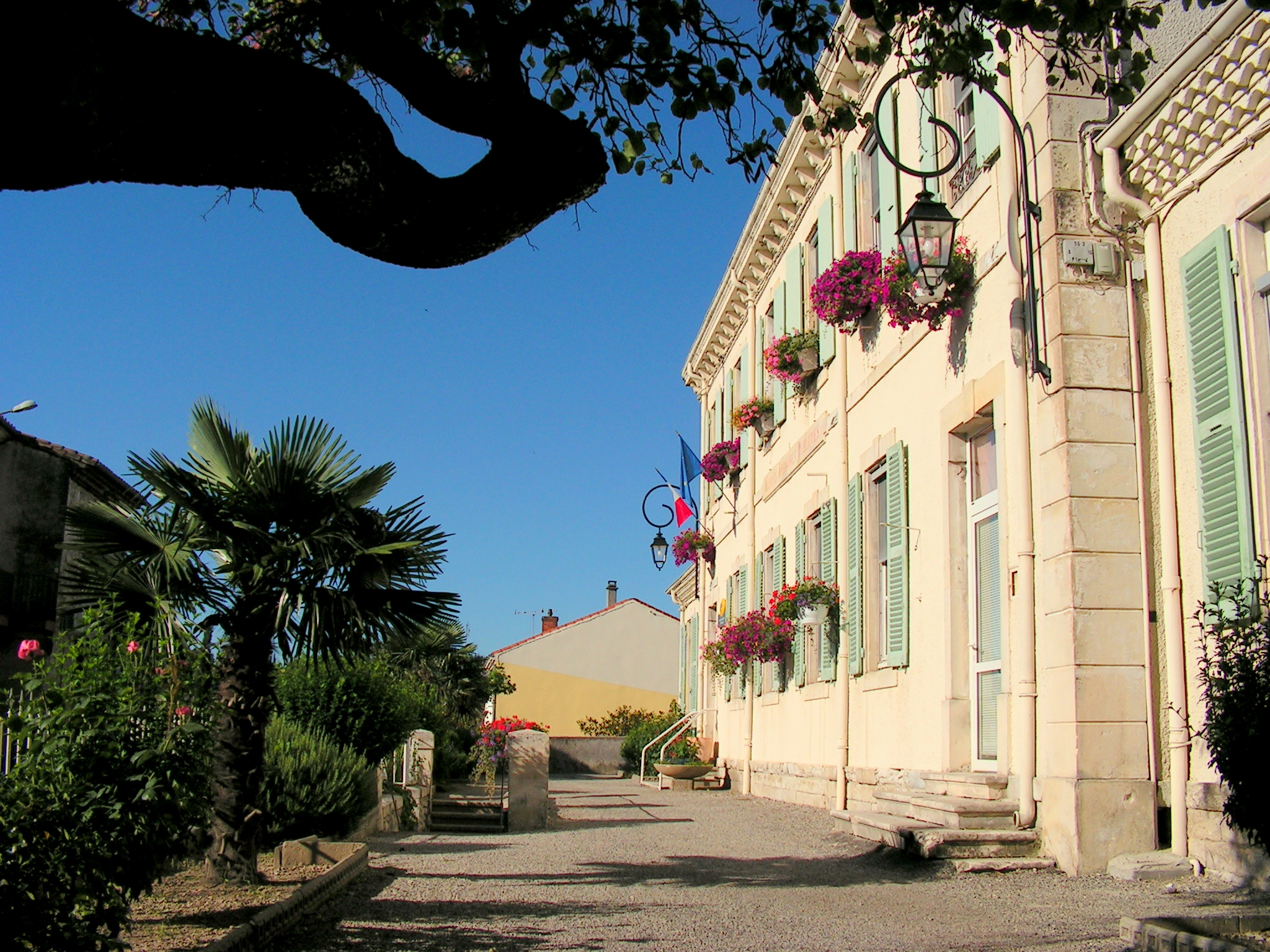
- The town hall of Saint-Gervais-sur-Roubion
- Location of Saint-Gervais-sur-Roubion
- Location within France Location within Auvergne-Rhône-Alpes
- Coordinates: 44°34′59″N 4°53′28″E
- Country: France
- Region: Auvergne-Rhône-Alpes
- Department: Drôme
- Arrondissement: Nyons
- Canton: Dieulefit
- Intercommunality: Montélimar Agglomération

Government
  - Mayor (2020–2026): Hervé Andéol
- Area^{1}: 14.57 km^{2} (5.63 sq mi)
- Elevation: 161 m (528 ft)
- Highest elevation: 233 m (764 ft)
- Lowest elevation: 144 m (472 ft)
- Population (2023): 1,091
  - Density: 74.88/km^{2} (193.9/sq mi)
- Time zone: UTC+01:00 (CET)
  - Summer (DST): UTC+02:00 (CEST)
- INSEE/Postal code: 26305 /26160
- ^{1} French Land Register data, which excludes lakes, ponds, glaciers > 1 km^{2} (0.386 sq mi or 247 acres) and river estuaries.

Saint-Gervais-sur-Roubion (French pronunciation: [sɛ̃ ʒɛʁvɛ syʁ ʁubjɔ̃]; Vivaro-Alpine: Sant Gervais de Robion) is a commune in the Drôme department in southeastern France.

== Population ==
Historical population
Year	Pop.	±% p.a.
1968	620	—
1975	552	−1.65%
1982	594	+1.05%
1990	646	+1.05%
1999	717	+1.17%
2007	771	+0.91%
2012	883	+2.75%
2017	1,035	+3.23%
2023	1,091	+0.88%
Source: INSEE

== See also ==
- Communes of the Drôme department
