= La Bâtie-Rolland =

- Commune
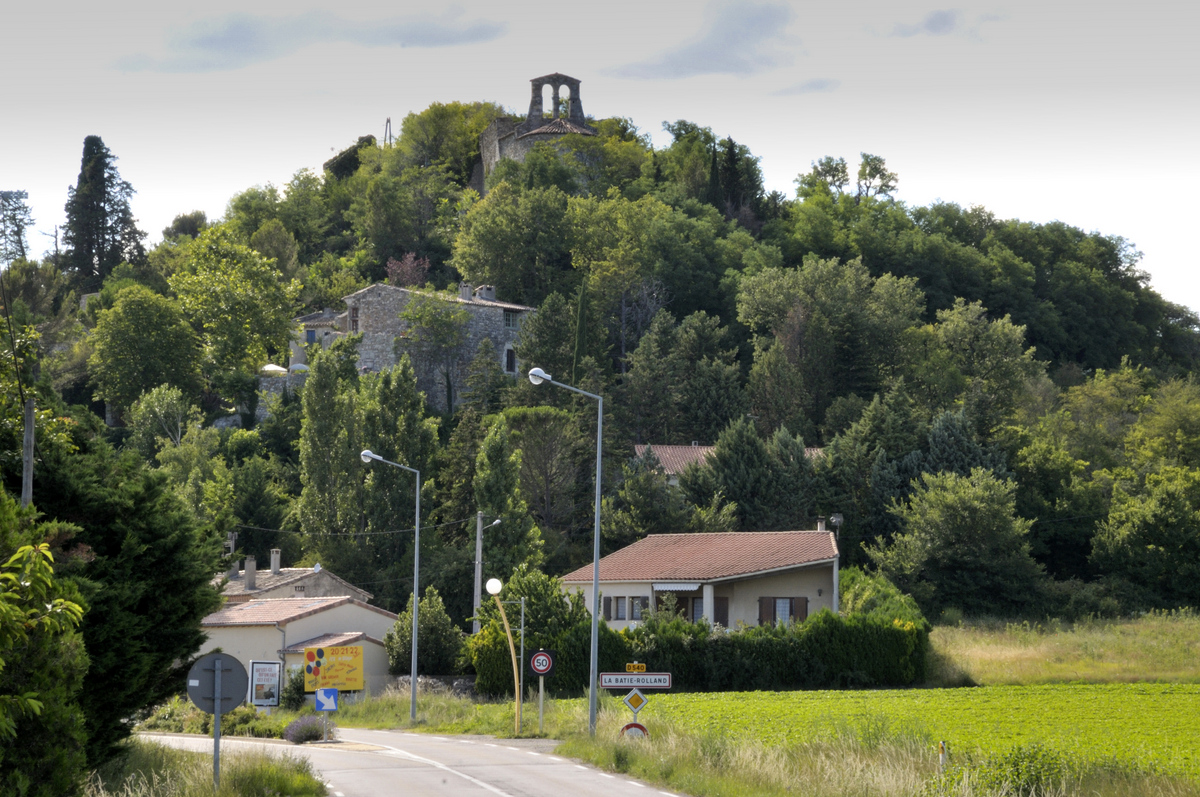
- The village of La Bâtie-Rolland

- Coat of arms
- Location of La Bâtie-Rolland
- Location within France Location within Auvergne-Rhône-Alpes
- Coordinates: 44°33′18″N 4°51′57″E
- Country: France
- Region: Auvergne-Rhône-Alpes
- Department: Drôme
- Arrondissement: Nyons
- Canton: Dieulefit
- Intercommunality: Montélimar Agglomération

Government
  - Mayor (2020–2026): Pascal Beynet
- Area^{1}: 8.33 km^{2} (3.22 sq mi)
- Highest elevation: 210 m (690 ft)
- Lowest elevation: 130 m (430 ft)
- Population (2023): 1,087
  - Density: 130/km^{2} (338/sq mi)
- Time zone: UTC+01:00 (CET)
  - Summer (DST): UTC+02:00 (CEST)
- INSEE/Postal code: 26031 /26160
- ^{1} French Land Register data, which excludes lakes, ponds, glaciers > 1 km^{2} (0.386 sq mi or 247 acres) and river estuaries.

La Bâtie-Rolland (French pronunciation: [la bati ʁɔlɑ̃]; Occitan: La Bastiá de Rotland) is a commune in the Drôme department in southeastern France.

== Population ==
Historical population
Year	Pop.	±% p.a.
1968	578	—
1975	603	+0.61%
1982	637	+0.79%
1990	712	+1.40%
1999	814	+1.50%
2007	906	+1.35%
2012	900	−0.13%
2017	1,029	+2.72%
2023	1,087	+0.92%
Source: INSEE

== See also ==
- Communes of the Drôme department
