= Les Tourrettes =

- Commune
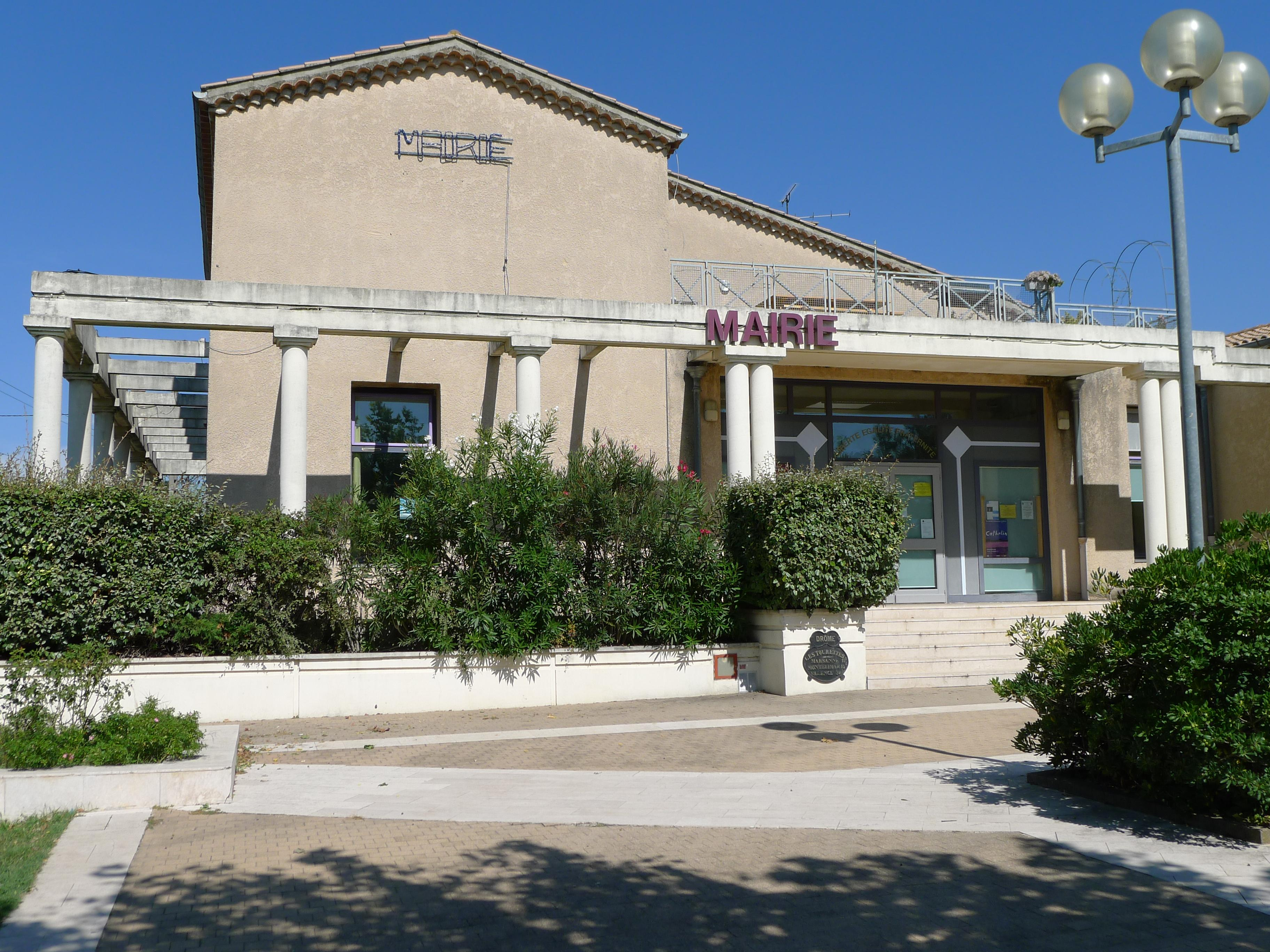
- The town hall of Les Tourrettes
- Location of Les Tourrettes
- Location within France Location within Auvergne-Rhône-Alpes
- Coordinates: 44°40′N 4°47′E
- Country: France
- Region: Auvergne-Rhône-Alpes
- Department: Drôme
- Arrondissement: Nyons
- Canton: Montélimar-1
- Intercommunality: Montélimar Agglomération

Government
  - Mayor (2022–2026): Jean-Pierre Laval
- Area^{1}: 7.34 km^{2} (2.83 sq mi)
- Elevation: 84 m (276 ft)
- Highest elevation: 380 m (1,250 ft)
- Lowest elevation: 73 m (240 ft)
- Population (2023): 1,087
  - Density: 148/km^{2} (384/sq mi)
- Time zone: UTC+01:00 (CET)
  - Summer (DST): UTC+02:00 (CEST)
- INSEE/Postal code: 26353 /26740
- ^{1} French Land Register data, which excludes lakes, ponds, glaciers > 1 km^{2} (0.386 sq mi or 247 acres) and river estuaries.

Les Tourrettes (French pronunciation: [le tuʁɛt]; Occitan: Las Torretas) is a commune in the Drôme department in southeastern France.

== Population ==
Historical population
Year	Pop.	±% p.a.
1968	277	—
1975	300	+1.15%
1982	461	+6.33%
1990	691	+5.19%
1999	763	+1.11%
2007	940	+2.64%
2012	1,076	+2.74%
2017	1,030	−0.87%
2023	1,087	+0.90%
Source: INSEE

== See also ==
- Communes of the Drôme department
