= Portes-en-Valdaine =

- Commune
- Location of Portes-en-Valdaine
- Location within France Location within Auvergne-Rhône-Alpes
- Coordinates: 44°31′49″N 4°54′45″E
- Country: France
- Region: Auvergne-Rhône-Alpes
- Department: Drôme
- Arrondissement: Nyons
- Canton: Dieulefit
- Intercommunality: Montélimar Agglomération

Government
  - Mayor (2020–2026): Jean-Bernard Charpenel
- Area^{1}: 15.04 km^{2} (5.81 sq mi)
- Highest elevation: 470 m (1,540 ft)
- Lowest elevation: 157 m (515 ft)
- Population (2023): 459
  - Density: 30.5/km^{2} (79.0/sq mi)
- Time zone: UTC+01:00 (CET)
  - Summer (DST): UTC+02:00 (CEST)
- INSEE/Postal code: 26251 /26160
- ^{1} French Land Register data, which excludes lakes, ponds, glaciers > 1 km^{2} (0.386 sq mi or 247 acres) and river estuaries.

Portes-en-Valdaine (French pronunciation: [pɔʁt ɑ̃ valdɛn]) is a commune in the Drôme department in southeastern France.

== Population ==
Historical population
Year	Pop.	±% p.a.
1968	241	—
1975	220	−1.29%
1982	253	+2.02%
1990	274	+1.00%
1999	333	+2.19%
2007	379	+1.63%
2012	378	−0.05%
2017	399	+1.09%
2023	459	+2.36%
Source: INSEE

== See also ==
- Communes of the Drôme department
