= La Touche, Drôme =

La Touche
- Commune
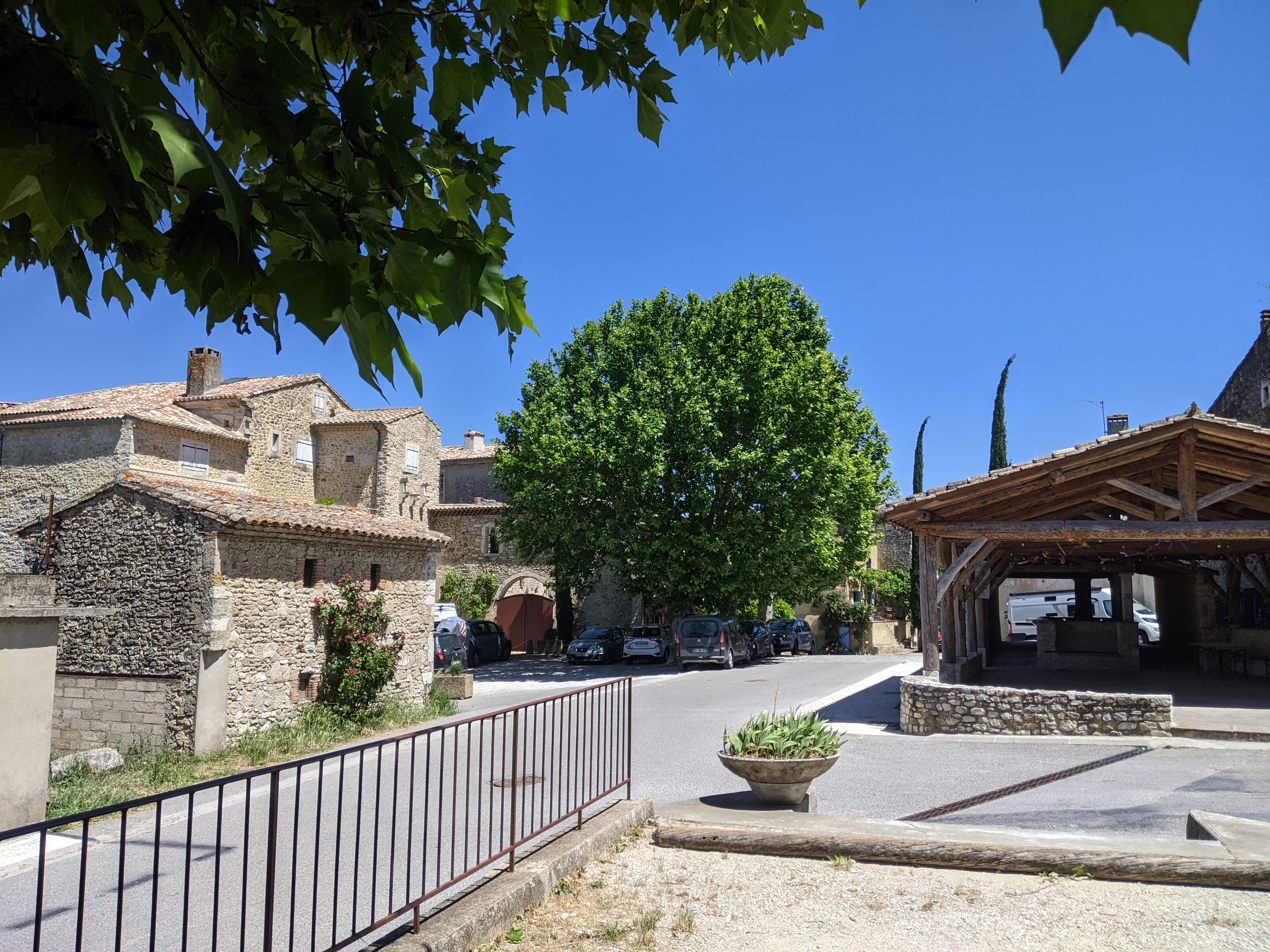
- Location of La Touche
- Location within France Location within Auvergne-Rhône-Alpes
- Coordinates: 44°30′54″N 4°53′13″E
- Country: France
- Region: Auvergne-Rhône-Alpes
- Department: Drôme
- Arrondissement: Nyons
- Canton: Dieulefit
- Intercommunality: Montélimar Agglomération

Government
  - Mayor (2021–2026): Sandrine Mourier
- Area^{1}: 8.29 km^{2} (3.20 sq mi)
- Elevation: 256 m (840 ft)
- Highest elevation: 458 m (1,503 ft)
- Lowest elevation: 153 m (502 ft)
- Population (2023): 260
  - Density: 31/km^{2} (81/sq mi)
- Time zone: UTC+01:00 (CET)
  - Summer (DST): UTC+02:00 (CEST)
- INSEE/Postal code: 26352 /26160
- ^{1} French Land Register data, which excludes lakes, ponds, glaciers > 1 km^{2} (0.386 sq mi or 247 acres) and river estuaries.

La Touche (French pronunciation: [la tuʃ]; Occitan: La Toscha) is a commune in the Drôme department in southeastern France.

== Population ==
Historical population
Year	Pop.	±% p.a.
1968	123	—
1975	110	−1.58%
1982	118	+1.01%
1990	123	+0.52%
1999	161	+3.04%
2007	190	+2.09%
2012	236	+4.43%
2017	253	+1.40%
2023	260	+0.46%
Source: INSEE

== See also ==
- Communes of the Drôme department
