= Charols =

- Commune
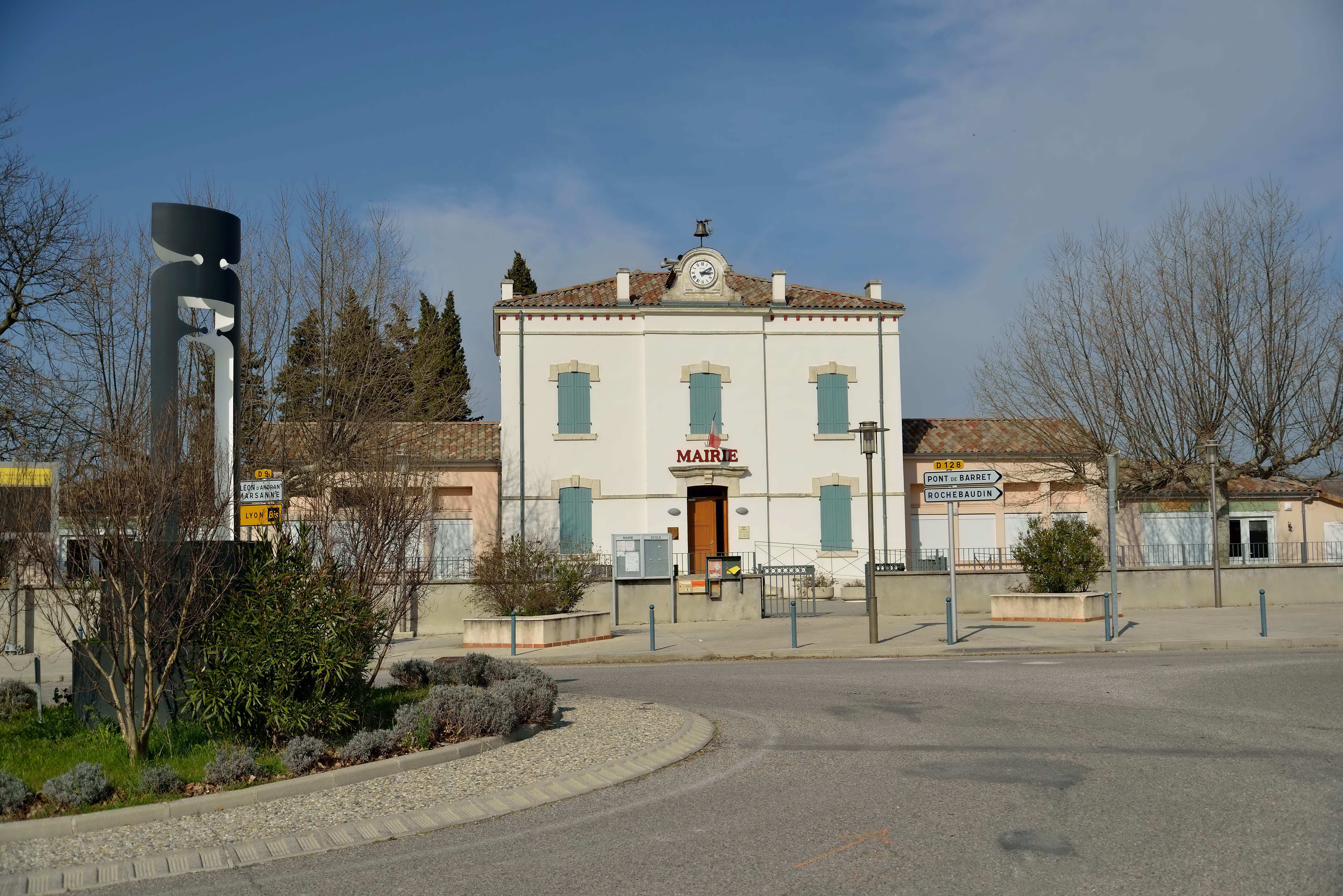
- The town hall in Charols

- Coat of arms
- Location of Charols
- Location within France Location within Auvergne-Rhône-Alpes
- Coordinates: 44°35′38″N 4°57′08″E
- Country: France
- Region: Auvergne-Rhône-Alpes
- Department: Drôme
- Arrondissement: Nyons
- Canton: Dieulefit
- Intercommunality: Montélimar Agglomération

Government
  - Mayor (2020–2026): Hervé Icard
- Area^{1}: 7.31 km^{2} (2.82 sq mi)
- Highest elevation: 290 m (950 ft)
- Lowest elevation: 184 m (604 ft)
- Population (2023): 965
  - Density: 132/km^{2} (342/sq mi)
- Time zone: UTC+01:00 (CET)
  - Summer (DST): UTC+02:00 (CEST)
- INSEE/Postal code: 26078 /26450
- ^{1} French Land Register data, which excludes lakes, ponds, glaciers > 1 km^{2} (0.386 sq mi or 247 acres) and river estuaries.

Charols is a commune in the Drôme department in southeast France.

== Population ==
Historical population
Year	Pop.	±% p.a.
1968	265	—
1975	261	−0.22%
1982	305	+2.25%
1990	415	+3.92%
1999	501	+2.11%
2007	721	+4.66%
2012	821	+2.63%
2017	918	+2.26%
2023	965	+0.84%
Source: INSEE

== See also ==
- Communes of the Drôme department
