= Condillac, Drôme =

Condillac
- Commune
- Location of Condillac
- Location within France Location within Auvergne-Rhône-Alpes
- Coordinates: 44°38′18″N 4°48′48″E
- Country: France
- Region: Auvergne-Rhône-Alpes
- Department: Drôme
- Arrondissement: Nyons
- Canton: Dieulefit
- Intercommunality: Montélimar Agglomération

Government
  - Mayor (2020–2026): Jacky Goutin
- Area^{1}: 9.57 km^{2} (3.69 sq mi)
- Highest elevation: 576 m (1,890 ft)
- Lowest elevation: 150 m (490 ft)
- Population (2023): 132
  - Density: 13.8/km^{2} (35.7/sq mi)
- Time zone: UTC+01:00 (CET)
  - Summer (DST): UTC+02:00 (CEST)
- INSEE/Postal code: 26102 /26740
- ^{1} French Land Register data, which excludes lakes, ponds, glaciers > 1 km^{2} (0.386 sq mi or 247 acres) and river estuaries.

Condillac (French pronunciation: [kɔ̃dijak]; Occitan: Condilhac) is a commune in the Drôme department in southeastern France.

== Population ==
Historical population
Year	Pop.	±% p.a.
1968	93	—
1975	86	−1.11%
1982	88	+0.33%
1990	124	+4.38%
1999	133	+0.78%
2007	157	+2.10%
2012	140	−2.27%
2017	139	−0.14%
2023	132	−0.86%
Source: INSEE

== See also ==
- Communes of the Drôme department
