= Montélimar =

Montélimar Montelaimar (Occitan)
- Commune
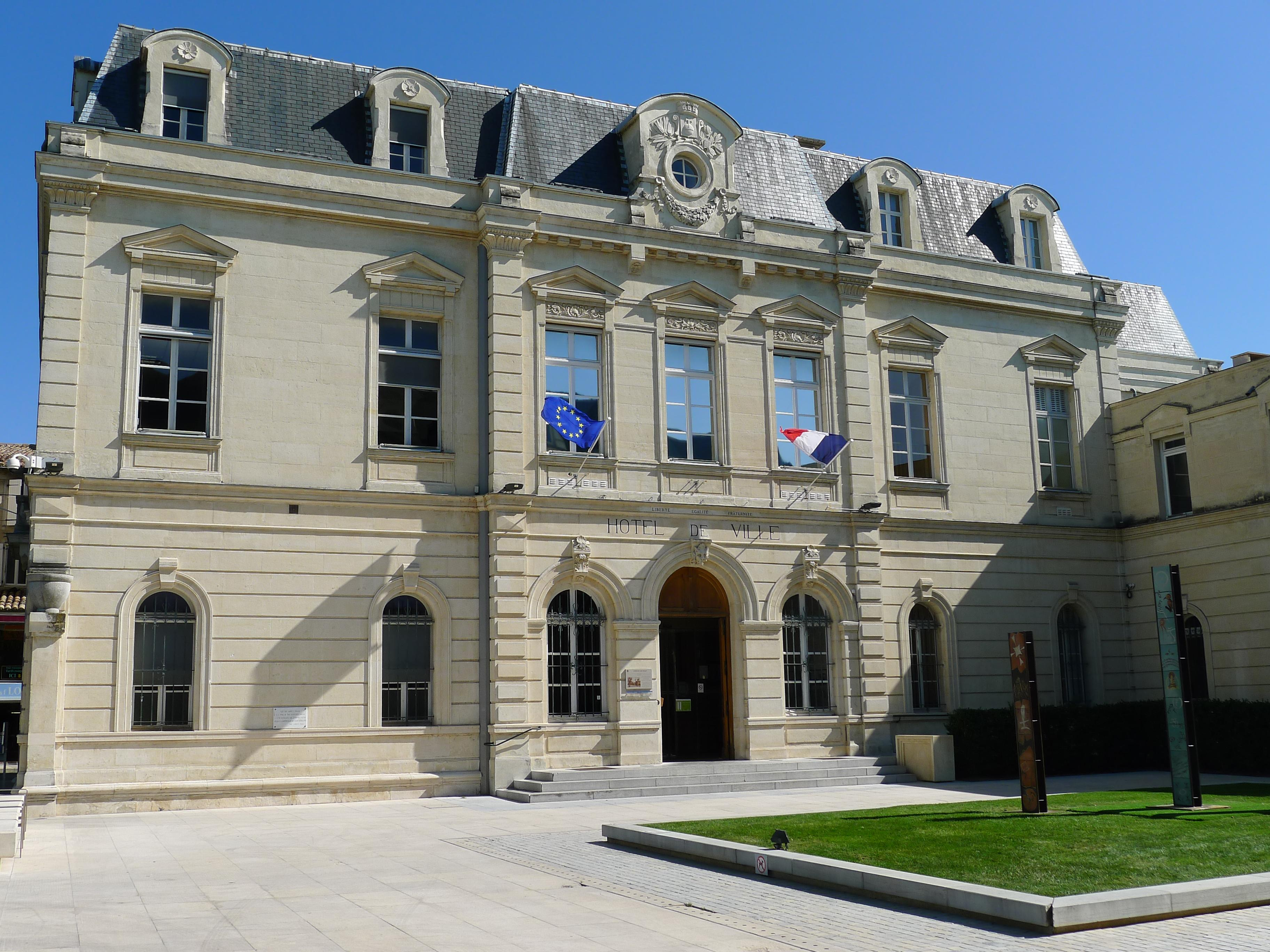
- The Hôtel de Ville

- Coat of arms
- Location of Montélimar
- Location within France Location within Auvergne-Rhône-Alpes
- Coordinates: 44°33′29″N 4°45′03″E
- Country: France
- Region: Auvergne-Rhône-Alpes
- Department: Drôme
- Arrondissement: Nyons
- Canton: Montélimar-1 and 2
- Intercommunality: Montélimar Agglomération

Government
  - Mayor (2020–2026): Julien Cornillet
- Area^{1}: 46.81 km^{2} (18.07 sq mi)
  - Urban: 132.3 km^{2} (51.1 sq mi)
- Elevation: 81 m (266 ft)
- Highest elevation: 213 m (699 ft)
- Lowest elevation: 56 m (184 ft)
- Population (2023): 40,595
  - Density: 867.2/km^{2} (2,246/sq mi)
  - Urban (2022): 58,395
  - Urban density: 441.4/km^{2} (1,143/sq mi)
- Time zone: UTC+01:00 (CET)
  - Summer (DST): UTC+02:00 (CEST)
- INSEE/Postal code: 26198 /26200
- ^{1} French Land Register data, which excludes lakes, ponds, glaciers > 1 km^{2} (0.386 sq mi or 247 acres) and river estuaries.

Montélimar (French pronunciation: [mɔ̃telimaʁ]; Vivaro-Alpine: Montelaimar pronounced [muntelajˈma]; Latin: Acumum) is a town in the Drôme department in the Auvergne-Rhône-Alpes region in Southeastern France. It is the second-largest town in the department after Valence. In 2022, the commune had a population of 40,356; its urban area had a population of 58,395.

== History ==
The site where the city of Montélimar stands today has been inhabited since the Celtic era. It was reconstructed during the Roman reign, including a basilica, aqueducts, thermae and a forum. The Adhémar family reigned over the city in the Middle Ages and built a castle (Château des Adhémar) which dominates the city silhouette even today. The Hôtel de Ville was officially opened in 1876.

== Demographics ==
Historical population

Year	Pop.	±% p.a.
1793	6,240	—
1800	6,320	+0.18%
1806	5,864	−1.24%
1821	7,161	+1.34%
1831	7,560	+0.54%
1836	7,966	+1.05%
1841	8,245	+0.69%
1846	9,445	+2.75%
1851	9,362	−0.18%
1856	11,523	+4.24%
1861	12,044	+0.89%
1866	11,100	−1.62%
1872	11,122	+0.03%
1876	11,946	+1.80%
1881	12,894	+1.54%
1886	14,014	+1.68%
1891	13,764	−0.36%
1896	13,741	−0.03%
1901	13,351	−0.57%

Year	Pop.	±% p.a.
1906	13,554	+0.30%
1911	13,281	−0.41%
1921	11,716	−1.25%
1926	11,210	−0.88%
1931	13,696	+4.09%
1936	15,187	+2.09%
1946	15,972	+0.51%
1954	16,639	+0.51%
1962	19,999	+2.33%
1968	26,748	+4.97%
1975	28,058	+0.69%
1982	29,161	+0.55%
1990	29,982	+0.35%
1999	31,344	+0.49%
2007	34,636	+1.26%
2012	35,704	+0.61%
2017	39,097	+1.83%
2023	40,595	+0.63%

Source: EHESS and INSEE (1968-2023)

== Personalities ==
- French navigator Louis de Freycinet and Émile Loubet, President of France from 1899 till 1906, who served also as mayor of Montélimar.
- Formula One racing driver Charles Pic, brother and fellow racing driver Arthur Pic and motorcycle racer Sylvain Guintoli.
- Encyclopédiste Antoine Penchenier (died in 1761) at an unknown date.
- Physician and Encyclopédiste Jean-Joseph Menuret (1739–1815) was born in Montélimar
- Louis Deschamps (1846 - 1902) was born in Montélimar
- Singer, writer, actress, TV host and fashion designer Marianne James was born in Montélimar in 1962.
- Michèle Rivasi (1953-2023), elected member of the European Parliament from 2009 to 2023, was born in Montélimar.

== Economy ==
The local nougat is one of the 13 desserts of Provence and highly appreciated throughout the country. Montelimar nougat is mentioned in the opening lines of the Beatles' "Savoy Truffle" from The White Album. Travellers used to buy nougat de Montélimar on their way to the south of France (or when returning) as the city is next to the Rhône and to the primary route N7. Since the construction of the A7 autoroute, many nougat factories have been forced to close as tourists no longer stop in Montélimar but bypass it instead.

== Climate ==
Montélimar has a humid subtropical climate (Cfa) according to the Köppen climate classification.

Climate data for Montélimar (1991–2020 normals, extremes 1920–present)
Month	Jan	Feb	Mar	Apr	May	Jun	Jul	Aug	Sep	Oct	Nov	Dec	Year
Record high °C (°F)	19.3 (66.7)	22.4 (72.3)	26.4 (79.5)	30.6 (87.1)	34.0 (93.2)	40.3 (104.5)	40.0 (104.0)	41.1 (106.0)	36.2 (97.2)	30.6 (87.1)	26.4 (79.5)	19.9 (67.8)	41.1 (106.0)
Mean daily maximum °C (°F)	8.8 (47.8)	10.5 (50.9)	15.1 (59.2)	18.3 (64.9)	22.5 (72.5)	26.9 (80.4)	29.8 (85.6)	29.6 (85.3)	24.4 (75.9)	18.9 (66.0)	12.8 (55.0)	9.1 (48.4)	18.9 (66.0)
Daily mean °C (°F)	5.7 (42.3)	6.6 (43.9)	10.2 (50.4)	13.1 (55.6)	17.1 (62.8)	21.1 (70.0)	23.7 (74.7)	23.5 (74.3)	19.2 (66.6)	14.8 (58.6)	9.5 (49.1)	6.2 (43.2)	14.2 (57.6)
Mean daily minimum °C (°F)	2.6 (36.7)	2.7 (36.9)	5.3 (41.5)	7.8 (46.0)	11.6 (52.9)	15.4 (59.7)	17.6 (63.7)	17.4 (63.3)	13.9 (57.0)	10.7 (51.3)	6.3 (43.3)	3.4 (38.1)	9.6 (49.3)
Record low °C (°F)	−14.4 (6.1)	−17.0 (1.4)	−7.4 (18.7)	−3.1 (26.4)	−1.8 (28.8)	3.5 (38.3)	7.5 (45.5)	5.6 (42.1)	0.5 (32.9)	−1.6 (29.1)	−10.0 (14.0)	−17.2 (1.0)	−17.2 (1.0)
Average precipitation mm (inches)	68.7 (2.70)	42.5 (1.67)	49.0 (1.93)	74.4 (2.93)	77.7 (3.06)	56.5 (2.22)	55.1 (2.17)	56.3 (2.22)	115.9 (4.56)	133.0 (5.24)	128.7 (5.07)	61.7 (2.43)	919.5 (36.20)
Average precipitation days (≥ 1.0 mm)	6.9	5.3	5.7	7.7	7.3	5.5	4.7	4.9	6.2	8.2	8.4	6.8	77.5
Average snowy days	2.3	2.1	0.9	0.1	0.0	0.0	0.0	0.0	0.0	0.0	0.8	2.4	8.6
Average relative humidity (%)	80	76	70	68	70	67	62	65	72	80	81	81	72.7
Mean monthly sunshine hours	106.6	135.8	199.9	218.7	260.2	299.7	330.4	298.6	231.2	155.9	109.7	94.5	2,441.1
Source 1: Meteociel
Source 2: Infoclimat.fr (humidity and snowy days, 1961–1990)

== International relations ==
Montélimar is twinned with:

- Mollet del Vallès, Spain
- Nabeul, Tunisia
- Racine, United States
- Ravensburg, Germany
- Rhondda Cynon Taf, Wales, United Kingdom
- Rivoli, Italy
- Sisian, Armenia

== See also ==
- Communes of the Drôme department
