= Sauzet, Drôme =

Sauzet
- Commune
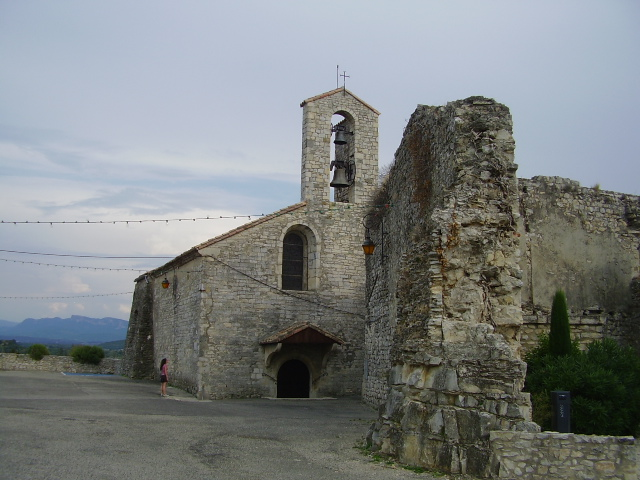
- The church of Sauzet
- Location of Sauzet
- Location within France Location within Auvergne-Rhône-Alpes
- Coordinates: 44°36′11″N 4°49′10″E
- Country: France
- Region: Auvergne-Rhône-Alpes
- Department: Drôme
- Arrondissement: Nyons
- Canton: Dieulefit
- Intercommunality: Montélimar Agglomération

Government
  - Mayor (2023–2026): Julien Duvoid
- Area^{1}: 19.19 km^{2} (7.41 sq mi)
- Highest elevation: 430 m (1,410 ft)
- Lowest elevation: 92 m (302 ft)
- Population (2023): 1,882
  - Density: 98.07/km^{2} (254.0/sq mi)
- Time zone: UTC+01:00 (CET)
  - Summer (DST): UTC+02:00 (CEST)
- INSEE/Postal code: 26338 /26740
- ^{1} French Land Register data, which excludes lakes, ponds, glaciers > 1 km^{2} (0.386 sq mi or 247 acres) and river estuaries.

Sauzet (French pronunciation: [sozɛ]; Occitan: Sauset) is a commune in the Drôme department in southeastern France.

== Population ==
Historical population
Year	Pop.	±% p.a.
1968	1,110	—
1975	1,126	+0.20%
1982	1,335	+2.46%
1990	1,436	+0.92%
1999	1,673	+1.71%
2007	1,858	+1.32%
2012	1,843	−0.16%
2017	1,840	−0.03%
2023	1,882	+0.38%
Source: INSEE

== See also ==
- Communes of the Drôme department
