= House of Sabran =

Provenical nobility

Coat of Arms of the House of Sabran

The House of Sabran was a Provençal family whose bloodline was extinguished in 1847 in the person of Elzéar-Louis of Sabran, general, who was made a hereditary peer of France in 1815, comte-pair (count-peer) in 1817, and duc-pair (duke-peer) in 1825. Among its members are two Catholic saints, three bishops, and five generals.

Because his marriage with Victorine-Antoinette de Pontevès was childless, he named as his heirs the two nephews of his wife: Edouard and Léonide de Pontevès-Bargème, in whose favor a royal ordinance of 1828 and 1829 letters-patent authorised the transmission of the title of Duke of Sabran. Through an 1832 adoption, the name de Sabran has since been carried by the de Pontevès family.

== Origin ==
The name stemmed from the barony of Sabran near Bagnols sur Cèze in the north of the département of Gard. The barony also possessed in Provence significant assets in the town of Beaucaire, as well as a portion of the city of Uzès, which fell to it as a result of the marriage around 1156 of Rostaing II to Roscie du Caylar, granddaughter of Elzéart d'Uzès. The ancient old, former lords of Sabran styled themselves by the grace of God, constables of the counts of Toulouse.

The family was very proud to count two Catholic saints among its members : Elzéar de Sabran, canonized in 1369, and his wife Dauphine or Delphine, proclaimed bienheureuse, for their mystic love and their love for the humble. Procession is still made for them every September in Ansouis, whose lordly domain has belonged to their family since the 10th century, then belonged to it again from 1836 to 2008.

Several of its members were knights of the order of Malta, marshalls of the kingdom of Naples or officers of high rank in the royal navy (Marine royale) in France.

They were also counts of Ariano, sovereign counts of Forcalquier, counts of Sabran, then of Sabran-Pontevès, baron of Ansouis, and peers and dukes of France. The family was received to the Honneurs de la Cour.

== Heraldic devices ==
The arms of William I of Sabran

- Arms: Gules, a lion rampant Argent
  - The arms of William I of Sabran – Gules, a lion rampant Or – being different than those of his descendants – are in the Salle des croisades (Crusaders' Hall) of the château de Versailles. They are the same as those of the city of Ansouis.
- Motto: Noli irritare leonem ("Do not anger the lion") or Immobilis intermobilia nixus ("Steadfast under pressure")
- Sobriquet: Simplicité de Sabran ("The simplicity of Sabran")

== House of Sabran in history ==
=== 8th – 13th centuries ===
The House of Sabran descends from Charles Martel through his son Pepin the Short. Pepin became the husband of Bertrade de Laon. They gave birth to Mathilde and Gueraud d'Auvergne, the couple who originated the Amic de Sabran and Sabran families.

- Their granddaughter Avigerne, the wife of Aigulfe de Maguelone, gave birth to Benedict of Aniane, whose son Amicus de Maguelone married a countess of Avignon whose daughter N Amicus d'Avignon would be the mother of Pierre Amic, who in turn was the father of Rostaing I de Sabran, the husband of Belletrude de Tresques who received the village and the château from whence he drew his name.
- (his/her) son Emmenon I of Sabran would carry the name of Aimeri de Roca, who would marry Emmengarde de Béziers and would inherit the château and the village of la Roque as well as its dependencies.
- Rostaing II (993-1006) the son of Emenon (see above) would receive the château of Sabran
- Emenon de Sabran (before 1006–1043) was present on 18 December 1029 with the Count of Toulouse William III Taillefer and several great lords for the act of the founding of the Saint-Pierre-de-Sauve monastery.
- Rostaing II would marry Simone de Posquières who gave him Emenon II de la Roque, who assisted in 1066 in getting a favorable ruling with his son Hugues de la Roque, bishop of Uzès, born of a daughter from the House of Savoie, and husband to Guillemette de Nîmes, through an act passed at the Church of Saint-Baudile in Nîmes, by Raymond IV, in favor of the abbey of Saint-Gilles du Gard, Gibelin de Sabran and William 1st of Sabran.
- William I of Sabran would marry his cousin Adalasie Amic, daughter of Pierre Amic and Agnès of Avignon, the descendant of Louis Boson the Blind, King of Provence, and great-granddaughter of Louis the Pious and of Anne of Constantinople. William I is known for having had la chartreuse de Valbonne with Burgundy roofs built, which is in a forest between la Roque and Goudargues, where he owned property.
- The son of William I, called William of Châteauneuf, married Constance Amic, the granddaughter of Pierre Amic and Agnes of Avignon. Their son Rostaing III of Sabran would marry Roscie of Uzès, who would bring part of that city en héritage to the Sabran family, whose son Rainon II of Uzès married Garsinde de Forcalquier, and their grandson Guiraud Amic II de Sabran would wed Alix de Forcalquier. Their son William IV of Sabran in turn wed Guillemette Amic, daughter of Guiraud Amic I and Galburge du Caylar and granddaughter of William of Châteauneuf and Constance Amic.
- William of Châteauneuf and Constance Amic had another son, William IV of Sabran, who married Emmengarde Mévouillon; their descendants would have ties with the lords of Baux, of De Banne, of Sabran, and of Nicolaï.
- Their son Pierre de Castelnau, papal legate, married in turn Dauphine of Sabran de la Roque and the daughter of Raimond Bernard de la Roque, the latter himself the son of Hugues de la Roque, Bishop of Uzès.
- Guillaume de Sabran, son of Géraud Amic and Adélaïde de Forcalquier.
- Upon the death of Guillaume II de Forcalquier, Guillaume de Sabran relied on the non-compliance with the testamentary provisions of Bertrand de Forcalquier to claim the inheritance. He took the title of Count of Forcalquier in 1202–1204, and succeeded in seizing Forcalquier and a large part of the estate. He granted franchises to Sisteron, before Raymond Bérenger of Provence escaped from Catalonia and obtained recognition of loyalty from his subjects. In 1220, he obtained the southern half of the county.

=== 18th century – present ===
- Louis Hector Honoré Maxime de Sabran (4 December 1739–1811), the last Bishop of Laon, grand almoner of Queen Marie-Antoinette, deputy of the clergy to the Estates-General of 1789, opponent of the Civil Constitution of the Clergy. If the name of Sabran remains attached to the domain of Ansouis in the Luberon, he can boast of being linked to the great families of Europe. Philippine de Sabran would be the grandmother of the princes de Monaco and the queen of England spoke of the Sabrans as her cousins since Garsinde de Sabran, wife of Ildefonse of Provence, had a son named Raymond Béranger whose wife, Beatrice of Savoy, would give him four daughters married to the kings of France, of Cornwall, and of England.
- One of the descendants of Garsinde de Sabran would be the Prince of Conti, Procureur of the king and Baron of Bagnols, who as such pretended to the inheritance of the domain of La Roque through the sons of Captain Guillaume de la Gor of la Roque via the captain's son Guillaume de la Gorce, whose wife, Catherine Blisson, was a descendant of Rostaing II of Sabran by his son Rostaing de Posquières.
- The House of Sabran saw its descendant rise to the Papacy as Pope Urban V (Born Guillaume Grimoard de Roure).
- Over time and by inheritance the domaine of Sabran became divided, it included all the north-east of the Gard from the Mas Sabin to the south of Meynargues, including the known towns of Pont-Saint-Esprit, Bagnols-sur-Cèze, Tavel known for its wine, Lirac, Saint-Victor-la-Coste, Lussan, Vallérargues, and all the parts of the estates brought by their wives through marriage, such as Uzès, Posquières, Caylar, Baux, Forcalquier, etc.
- On 29 October 2007, the ancestral domain, undivided property since 1973, left the patrimony of the Sabran-Pontevès by a judicial sale ordered by the tribunal de grande instance of Paris, at the request of the sole co-heir, Princess Jacques d'Orléans, duchess of Orléans, née Gersende de Sabran-Pontevès, in litigation with her three brothers, who, wishing to leave 25 years of joint ownership, caused the division and sale of the goods constituting the family patrimony.
- Pierre Cardin would receive as part of an inheritance the château and the village of La Roque, as well as its dependencies. In 2009, at the auction for the families' ancestral Château of Ansouis, after Pierre Cardin having been outbid, a second sale took place by the 3rd Duke for the benefit of Gérard et Frédérique Rousset-Rouvière, who acquired it for 5.6 million Euros.

== List of dukes of Sabran ==
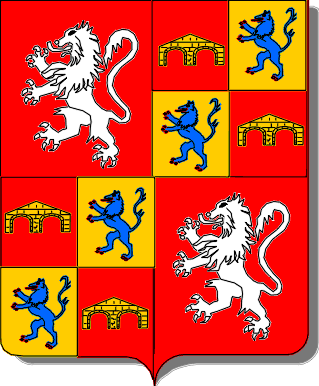
Coat of arms of the Dukes of Sabran-Pontevès (Quarterly; 1,4 Gules, a lion rampant Argent (Sabran); 2,3 counter-charged; a,d Gules, two-arched bridge Or (Pontevès); b,c Or, a wolf rampant Azure, claws, tongue, genitals Gules (Agoult))

House of Sabran (extinguished)

- Elzéar Louis Zozime (1764–1847), first duke of Sabran in 1825. He adopted the twins Marc Edouard and Joseph Léonide of Pontevès, nephews of his wife, and transmitted the title to them.

House of Ponteves

- Marc Edouard of Sabran-Pontevès (1811–1878), 2nd duke of Sabran, nephew of his predecessor, duke of Sabran-Pontevès by letters patent of July 18, 1829, authorising him inherit the title from his uncle.
- Elzéar Charles Antoine of Sabran-Pontevès (1840–1894), 3rd duke of Sabran, son of his predecessor.
- Edmond Marie Zozime de Sabran-Pontevès (1841–1903), 4th duke of Sabran, brother of his predecessor, husband of Charlotte de la Tullaye, with whom he inherited the château de Magnanne à Ménil (Mayenne) in 1883. He was the mayor of that village from 1883 to 1896.
- Hélion Louis Marie Élzéar of Sabran-Pontevès (1873–1920), 5th duke of Sabran, son of the 4th.
- Amic René Louis Marie Élzéar de Sabran-Pontevès (1879–1963), 6th duke of Sabran, brother of the previous, mayor of Ménil from 1908 to 1912.
- Marie Joseph Elzéar Gustave Jean Foulques de Sabran-Pontevès (1908–1973), 7th duke of Sabran, cousin of the previous, descendant of Joseph Léonide de Pontevès.
- Charles Elzéar Marie Joseph Adrien de Sabran-Pontevès (1937–2024), 8th duke of Sabran, son of the previous.
- Géraud Marie de Sabran-Pontevès (1943-), 9th duke of Sabran, brother of the previous.

== Other members ==
- Gersende de Sabran-Pontevès (1912–2013), mayor of Tramayes (1971–1989), daughter of Amic de Sabran-Pontevès, wife of Amaury de Chansiergues d'Ornano then Christian de Quatrebarbes. Legitimist, she was from the 1940s on a faithful supporter of the Infante Jaime, Duke of Segovia and his descendants. Gersende de Quatrebarbes was présidente d'honneur of the Vendée Militaire Association, succeeding Gonzalve de Bourbon, Duke of Aquitaine.
- Gersende de Sabran-Pontevès (1942–present), cousin of previous, daughter of Foulques de Sabran-Pontevès (1908–1973), 7th duke of Sabran, and wife of Jacques d'Orléans (1941–present), Duke of Orléans.
- Jean Henri, Count of Sabran-Pontevès (1939), brother of the previous, had four daughters.
- Géraud Marie de Sabran-Pontevès, Vicomte de Sabran (1943–present), brother of the previous, mayor of Ansouis, had four sons.
- Delphine de Sabran, French society hostess and daughter of Joseph, comte de Sabran.

== Family tree ==
Rostaing de Sabran, lord of Tresques and of Lirac, advisor  to the count of Toulouse
x Belletrude des Baux
│
└─> Emenon
    x Ermengarde de Béziers
    │
    └─> Rostaing
        ├─> Emenon
        │
        ├─> Guillaume
        │   │
        │   ├─> Pierre
        │   │
        │   ├─> Rostaing, lord of Uzès wed in first marriage: Constance Amic daughter of Giraud Amic (1094–1102), it was she who brought Ansouis into the de Sabran family 
        │   │   x 2nd marriage: Roscie of Uzès, lady of Le Caylar
        │   │   │
        │   │   ├─> Rainier de Sabran, lord of Le Caylar and of Ansouis, co-lord of Uzès
        │   │   │   x 1) Garsende, countess of Forcalquier, lady of La Tour-d'Aigues and of Ansouis
        │   │   │   │ │
        │   │   │   │ ├─> Garsende, countess of Forcalquier
        │   │   │   │ │   x Alphonse II, Count of Provence
        │   │   │   │ │
        │   │   │   │ └─> Béatrix, Countess of Gap and of Embrun, lady of Le Caylar
        │   │   │   │     x Guigues VI of Bourgogne, dauphin of Viennois, count of Albon, of Gap et d'Embrun
        │   │   │   │
        │   │   │   x 2)
        │   │   │     │
        │   │   │     ├─> Guillaume, baron of Ansouis, count of Ariano
        │   │   │     │   │
        │   │   │     │   ├─> Elzéar, lord of Ansouis, of Cucuron and of Vaugines, co-lord of Uzès
        │   │   │     │   │   x Cécile d'Agoult
        │   │   │     │   │
        │   │   │     │   └─> Ermengol
        │   │   │     │
        │   │   │     └─> Raine, lord of La Tour d'Aigues
        │   │   │         x Philippine of Mamolène
        │   │   │         │
        │   │   │         ├─> Rostaing, seigneur of la Tour d'Aigues
        │   │   │         │
        │   │   │         └─> Garsende
        │   │   │             x Guillaume Adhémar de Monteil, seigneur de Grignan and of Peypin d'Aigues
        │   │   │ 
        │   │   └─> Elzéar, lord of Caylar
        │   │       x Guillemette de Sabran
        │   │ 
        │   ├─> Guillaume
        │   │   │
        │   │   ├─> Giraud
        │   │   │   x Galburge of Caylar
        │   │   │
        │   │   └─> William
        │   │
        │   └─> Emenon 
        │
        └─> Gibelin (-1112), archbishop of Arles (1108–1112), légat du pape (1107–1107), Patriarch of Jerusalem (1108–1112)

== See also ==
- Familles subsistantes de la noblesse française

Properties of the Sabran-Pontevès family

- Ansouis (château)
- Pontevès (château ruins)
- Bargème (château ruins)

== Bibliography ==
- Duchesse de Sabran-Pontevès (May 1987). Bon sang ne peut mentir [Good blood cannot lie]. Paris: Jean-Claude Lattès. p. 311. "Roselyne Manca de Vallombrosa, fille du comte de ce nom et d'Adrienne Lannes de Montebello, elle a épousé en 1936 Foulques, comte puis duc de Sabran-Pontevès, fils du comte de ce nom et de Constance, princesse de Croÿ. Par cet ouvrage, elle livre ses souvenirs au public. [Roselyne Manca de Vallombrosa, daughter of the count of that name and Adrienne Lannes de Montebello, she married in 1936 Foulques, count then duke of Sabran-Pontevès, son of the count of that name and Constance, princess of Croÿ. Through this work, she delivers her memories to the public.]"
