= William I of Sabran =

Crusader

The arms of William I of Sabran: de gueules, au lion of gold, different than those of his descendants, are in the Salle des croisades (Crusaders' Hall) of the château de Versailles. They are the same as those of the city of Ansouis.

William I of Sabran (between 1055 and 1105) was a Crusader from the House of Sabran who joined the army of Raymond of Saint-Gilles in October 1095 during the First Crusade.

William I was a nephew of Emenon or Amaujeu de Sabran, who was noted as the first person known in the House of Sabran who had a recorded signature in a historic document dating back to 1029. His descendants assumed the title of constables to the House of Tholouse.

== First Crusade ==
During the Battle of Antioch, Raymond IV of Toulouse decided to defend the fort of Mahomerie, then he chose his best captains to defend him: Pierre of Castillon, Raymond I of Turenne, William V of Montpellier, William I of Sabran and Gouffier of Lastours, in addition to 500 most valiant men of their troops. He was among the sixty crusaders who defended a bridge against Kerbogha's army. He was one of the first to enter the city, and took as prisoner the sons of the governor of the place.

During the siege of Jerusalem in July 1099, nine Genoese vessels arrived at the port of Jaffa to support the crusaders. Hence, the Count of Toulouse wanted to protect them, in which he sent Raymond Pilet d'Alès, William I of Sabran, and Raymond of Turenne at the head of 50 horsemen.

William I would marry his cousin Adalasie Amic, daughter of Pierre Amic and Agnès of Avignon, the descendant of Louis Boson the Blind, King of Provence, and great-granddaughter of Louis the Pious and of Anne of Constantinople. His son William of Châteauneuf, married Constance Amic, the granddaughter of Pierre Amic and Agnes of Avignon.

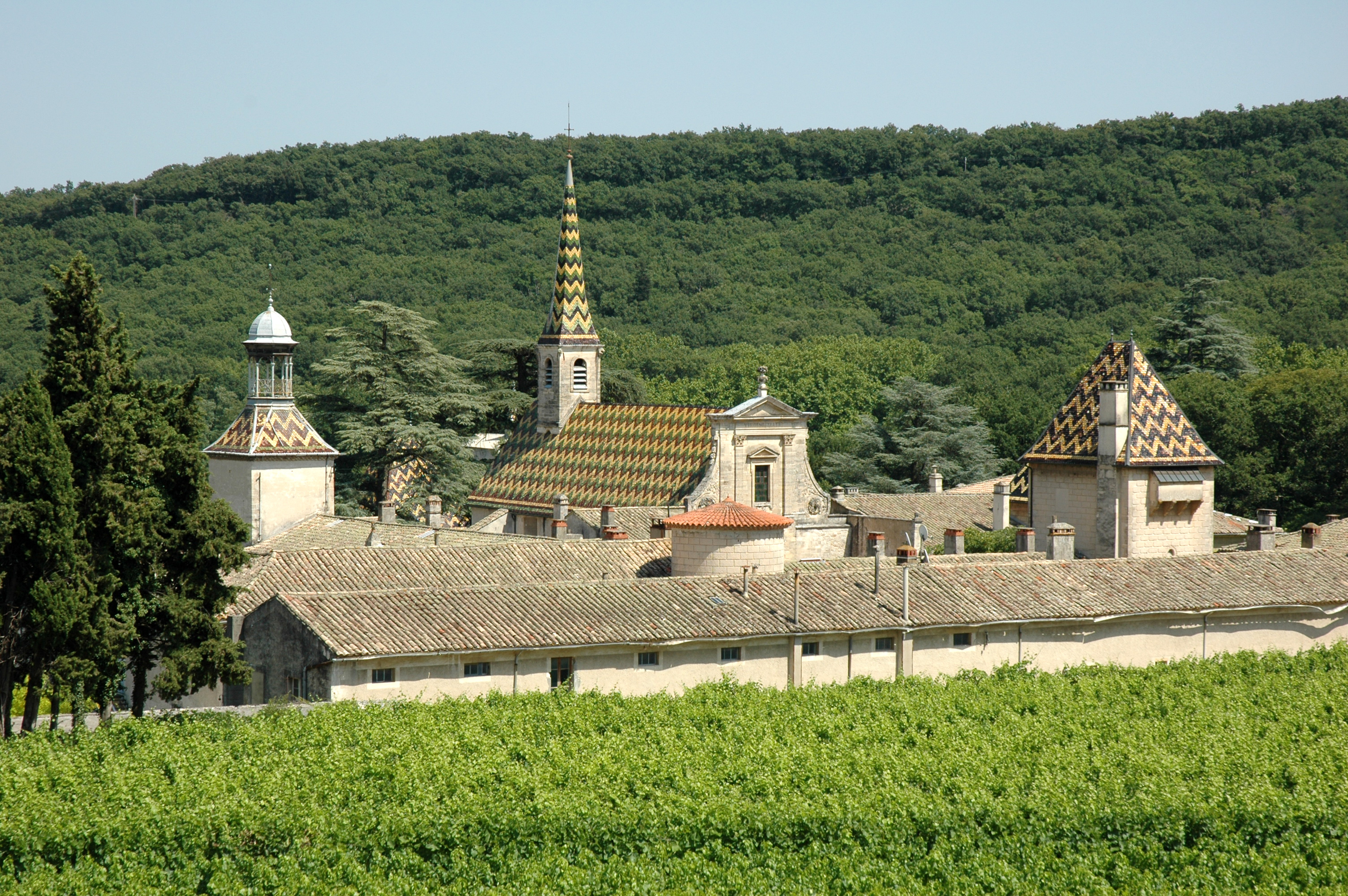
Charterhouse of Valbonne

William I was known for having built the “Charterhouse of Valbonne”, which was in a forest between La Roque and Goudargues.

== Bibliography ==
- de Vic, Claude; Vaissète, Joseph; Du Mège, Alexandre (1841). Histoire générale de Languedoc (in French). Vol. 3.
