= List of Michelin-starred restaurants in France =

As of the 2026 Michelin Guide, there are 659 restaurants in France with a Michelin star rating.

The Michelin Guides have been published by the French tire company Michelin since 1900. They were designed as a guide to tell drivers about eateries they recommended to visit and to subtly sponsor their tires, by encouraging drivers to use their cars more and therefore need to replace the tires as they wore out. Over time, the stars that were given out became more valuable.

Multiple anonymous Michelin inspectors visit the restaurants several times. They rate the restaurants on five criteria: "quality of products", "mastery of flavor and cooking techniques", "the personality of the chef represented in the dining experience", "value for money", and "consistency between inspectors' visits". Inspectors have at least ten years of expertise and create a list of popular restaurants supported by media reports, reviews, and diner popularity. If they reach a consensus, Michelin awards restaurants from one to three stars based on its evaluation methodology: one star means "high-quality cooking, worth a stop", two stars signify "excellent cooking, worth a detour", and three stars denote "exceptional cuisine, worth a special journey". The stars are not permanent and restaurants are constantly re-evaluated. If the criteria are not met, the restaurant will lose its stars.

== Auvergne-Rhône-Alpes ==
As of the 2026 guide, there are 105 restaurants with a Michelin-star rating in Auvergne-Rhône-Alpes, which includes the city of Lyon.

Key
1 Michelin star	One Michelin star
2 Michelin stars	Two Michelin stars
3 Michelin stars	Three Michelin stars
—	The restaurant did not receive a star that year
Closed	The restaurant is no longer open

Michelin-starred restaurants
Name	Cuisine	Location	2025	2026
AinTimiste	Modern	Ain – Poncin	1 Michelin star	1 Michelin star
Albert 1er	Modern	Haute-Savoie – Chamonix	1 Michelin star	1 Michelin star
Alpage	Modern	Savoie – Courchevel	1 Michelin star	1 Michelin star
Ambroisie	French	Isère – Saint-Didier-de-la-Tour	1 Michelin star	1 Michelin star
Apicius	Modern	Puy-de-Dôme – Clermont-Ferrand	1 Michelin star	1 Michelin star
Asterales	Modern	Isère – Corrençon-en-Vercors	1 Michelin star	1 Michelin star
Atmosphères	Modern	Savoie – Le Bourget-du-Lac	1 Michelin star	1 Michelin star
Au 14 Février	Creative	Lyon – 5th Arrondissement	1 Michelin star	1 Michelin star
Auberge de Clochemerle	Modern	Rhône – Vaux-en-Beaujolais	1 Michelin star	1 Michelin star
Auberge de L'Abbaye	Modern	Ain – Ambronay	1 Michelin star	—
Auberge de la Tour	Modern	Cantal – Marcolès	1 Michelin star	—
Auberge de Montfleury	Creative	Ardèche – Saint-Germain	1 Michelin star	1 Michelin star
Auberge du Cep	Modern	Rhône – Fleurie	1 Michelin star	1 Michelin star
Auberge du Pont	Modern	Puy-de-Dôme – Pont-du-Château	1 Michelin star	1 Michelin star
Baumanière 1850	Creative	Savoie – Courchevel	2 Michelin stars	2 Michelin stars
Burgundy by Matthieu	Modern	Lyon – 2nd Arrondissement	1 Michelin star	1 Michelin star
Chalet Flachaire	Modern	Haute-Savoie – Abondance	—	1 Michelin star
Chateau Blanchard	Modern	Loire – Chazelles-sur-Lyon	1 Michelin star	1 Michelin star
Château d'Origny	Modern	Loire – Ouches	1 Michelin star	1 Michelin star
Circle	French	Lyon – 1st Arrondissement	—	1 Michelin star
Épithèque (Note: Was named Flaveurs until 2026)	Creative	Drôme – Valence	1 Michelin star	1 Michelin star
Flocons de Sel	Creative	Haute-Savoie – Megève	3 Michelin stars	3 Michelin stars
Frédéric Molina	Creative	Haute-Savoie – Vailly	1 Michelin star	1 Michelin star
Georges Blanc	Creative	Ain – Vonnas	2 Michelin stars	2 Michelin stars
Guy Lassausaie	Modern	Isère – Chasselay	1 Michelin star	1 Michelin star
Jean-Claude Leclerc	Modern	Puy-de-Dôme – Clermont-Ferrand	1 Michelin star	1 Michelin star
Jean Sulpice	Creative	Haute-Savoie – Talloires-Montmin	2 Michelin stars	2 Michelin stars
Kern	Modern	Haute-Savoie – Seytroux	1 Michelin star	1 Michelin star
L'Altitude	French	Savoie – Courchevel	—	1 Michelin star
L'Atelier des Augustins	Modern	Lyon – 1st Arrondissement	1 Michelin star	1 Michelin star
L'Atelier Yssoirien	French	Puy-de-Dôme – Issoire	1 Michelin star	Closed
L'Auberge de Lucinges	Modern	Haute-Savoie – Lucinges	1 Michelin star	1 Michelin star
L'Auberge de Montmin	Creative	Haute-Savoie – Talloires-Montmin	2 Michelin stars	2 Michelin stars
L'Ekrin	Modern	Savoie – Méribel	1 Michelin star	1 Michelin star
L'Émulsion	Creative	Isère – Saint-Alban-de-Roche	1 Michelin star	1 Michelin star
L'Esquisse	Modern	Haute-Savoie – Annecy	1 Michelin star	1 Michelin star
L'Étape Dorée	Creative	Lyon – Saint-Genis-Laval	—	1 Michelin star
L'Impulsif	Creative	Puy-de-Dôme – Châtel-Guyon	1 Michelin star	1 Michelin star
L'Ostal	Creative	Puy-de-Dôme – Clermont-Ferrand	1 Michelin star	1 Michelin star
La Bòria	Creative	Ardèche – Veyras	1 Michelin star	1 Michelin star
La Cachette	Creative	Drôme – Valence	1 Michelin star	1 Michelin star
La Chapelle	Creative	Allier – Montluçon	1 Michelin star	1 Michelin star
La Huchette	Modern	Ain – Replonges	1 Michelin star	1 Michelin star
La Pyramide	French	Isère – Vienne	2 Michelin stars	2 Michelin stars
La Rotonde des Trésoms	Modern	Haute-Savoie – Annecy	1 Michelin star	1 Michelin star
La Sommelière	Modern	Lyon – 5th Arrondissement	1 Michelin star	Closed
La Source	Modern	Loire – Saint-Galmier	1 Michelin star	1 Michelin star
La Table d'Armante	Modern	Haute-Savoie – Saint-Gervais-les-Bains	—	1 Michelin star
La Table de L'Alpaga	Creative	Haute-Savoie – Megève	1 Michelin star	1 Michelin star
La Table de L'Incomparable	Modern	Savoie – Tresserve	1 Michelin star	1 Michelin star
La Table de L'Ours	Creative	Savoie – Val-d'Isère	1 Michelin star	1 Michelin star
La Table de Philippe Girardon	Modern	Isère – Chonas-l'Amballan	1 Michelin star	1 Michelin star
La Table de Yoann Conte	Creative	Haute-Savoie – Veyrier-du-Lac	2 Michelin stars	2 Michelin stars
Lamartine	Modern	Savoie – Le Bourget-du-Lac	1 Michelin star	1 Michelin star
Lavandin	Modern	Drôme – Charols	1 Michelin star	1 Michelin star
Le 1947	Creative	Savoie – Courchevel	3 Michelin stars	3 Michelin stars
Le Carré d'Alethius	French	Ardèche – Charmes-sur-Rhône	1 Michelin star	1 Michelin star
Le Chabichou	Modern	Savoie – Courchevel	2 Michelin stars	1 Michelin star
Le Chamarlenc	Creative	Haute-Loire – Puy-en-Velay	1 Michelin star	1 Michelin star
Le Cin5	Creative	Haute-Savoie – La Clusaz	1 Michelin star	1 Michelin star
Le Clair de la Plume	Modern	Drôme – Grignan	1 Michelin star	1 Michelin star
Le Clocher des Pères	Modern	Savoie – Saint-Martin-sur-la-Chambre	1 Michelin star	1 Michelin star
Le Clos des Sens	Creative	Haute-Savoie – Annecy	3 Michelin stars	3 Michelin stars
Le Colombier (Note: Was named Domaine du Colombier until 2026)	Modern	Drôme – Malataverne	1 Michelin star	1 Michelin star
Le Farçon	Modern	Savoie – Courchevel	1 Michelin star	1 Michelin star
Le Gourmet de Sèze	French	Lyon – 6th Arrondissement	1 Michelin star	Closed
Le Haut-Allier	Modern	Haute-Loire – Alleyras	1 Michelin star	1 Michelin star
Le Kléber	Modern	Drôme – Grane	1 Michelin star	1 Michelin star
Le Neuvième Art	Creative	Lyon – 6th Arrondissement	2 Michelin stars	2 Michelin stars
Le P'tit Polyte	Modern	Isère – Les Deux-Alpes	1 Michelin star	—
Le Pré	Creative	Puy-de-Dôme – Clermont-Ferrand	2 Michelin stars	2 Michelin stars
Le Puy Tilleul	Modern	Cantal – Tournemire	—	1 Michelin star
Le Raisin	Modern	Ain – Pont-de-Vaux	1 Michelin star	1 Michelin star
Le Refuge des Gourmets	Modern	Haute-Savoie – Machilly	1 Michelin star	1 Michelin star
Le Sarkara	Creative	Savoie – Courchevel	2 Michelin stars	2 Michelin stars
Les Cèdres	French	Drôme – Granges-les-Beaumont	1 Michelin star	1 Michelin star
Les Explorateurs	Modern	Savoie – Val-Thorens	1 Michelin star	1 Michelin star
Les Fresques	Modern	Haute-Savoie – Évian-les-Bains	1 Michelin star	1 Michelin star
Les Loges	French	Lyon – 5th Arrondissement	—	1 Michelin star
Les Morainières	Creative	Savoie – Jongieux	2 Michelin stars	3 Michelin stars
Les Terrasses de Lyon	Modern	Lyon – 5th Arrondissement	1 Michelin star	—
Likoké	Belgian / Colombian	Ardèche – Les Vans	1 Michelin star	1 Michelin star
Maison Aribert	Creative	Isère – Uriage-les-Bains	2 Michelin stars	2 Michelin stars
Maison Benoît Vidal	Creative	Haute-Savoie – Annecy	2 Michelin stars	2 Michelin stars
Maison Decoret	Modern	Allier – Vichy	1 Michelin star	1 Michelin star
Maison Fantin Latour	Modern	Isère – Grenoble	1 Michelin star	1 Michelin star
Maison Pic	Creative	Drôme – Valence	3 Michelin stars	3 Michelin stars
Maltacina	Creative	Isère – Saint-Théoffrey	—	1 Michelin star
Mandibule	Modern	Drôme – Alixan	—	1 Michelin star
Marcon	Creative	Haute-Loire – Saint-Bonnet-le-Froid	3 Michelin stars	3 Michelin stars
Mère Brazier	French	Lyon – 1st Arrondissement	2 Michelin stars	2 Michelin stars
Miraflores	Peruvian	Lyon – 6th Arrondissement	1 Michelin star	1 Michelin star
Mont Blanc	Modern	Savoie – Hauteluce	1 Michelin star	1 Michelin star
Ô Flaveurs	Modern	Haute-Savoie – Douvaine	1 Michelin star	1 Michelin star
Ombellule	Creative	Lyon – 6th Arrondissement	1 Michelin star	1 Michelin star
Origines	Creative	Puy-de-Dôme – Le Broc	1 Michelin star	1 Michelin star
Palégrié Chez l'Henri	Creative	Isère – Autrans-Méaudre en Vercors	1 Michelin star	1 Michelin star
Paul Bocuse	French	Lyon – Collonges-au-Mont-d'Or	2 Michelin stars	2 Michelin stars
Prairial	Creative	Lyon – 2nd Arrondissement	1 Michelin star	1 Michelin star
Radio	Modern	Puy-de-Dôme – Chamalières	1 Michelin star	1 Michelin star
René et Maxime Meilleur	French	Savoie – Saint-Martin-de-Belleville	2 Michelin stars	2 Michelin stars
Restaurant de la Loire	Modern	Loire – Pouilly-sous-Charlieu	1 Michelin star	1 Michelin star
Rustique	Creative	Lyon – 2nd Arrondissement	1 Michelin star	1 Michelin star
Saisons	Creative	Lyon – Écully	1 Michelin star	1 Michelin star
Séchex Nous	Modern	Haute-Savoie – Margencel	1 Michelin star	1 Michelin star
Serge Vieira	Creative	Cantal – Chaudes-Aigues	2 Michelin stars	2 Michelin stars
Sylvestre Wahid	Creative	Savoie – Courchevel	2 Michelin stars	2 Michelin stars
Takao Takano	Creative	Lyon – 6th Arrondissement	2 Michelin stars	2 Michelin stars
Têtedoie	Modern	Lyon – 5th Arrondissement	1 Michelin star	1 Michelin star
Troisgros	Creative	Loire – Ouches	3 Michelin stars	3 Michelin stars
Ursus	Creative	Savoie – Tignes	1 Michelin star	1 Michelin star
Vincent Favre Félix	Haute-Savoie – Annecy	Haute-Savoie – Annecy	1 Michelin star	Closed
Vous	Modern	Haute-Savoie – Megève	1 Michelin star	1 Michelin star
Reference(s)				

== Bourgogne-Franche-Comté ==
As of the 2026 guide, there are 35 restaurants with a Michelin-star rating in Bourgogne-Franche-Comté.

Key
1 Michelin star	One Michelin star
2 Michelin stars	Two Michelin stars
3 Michelin stars	Three Michelin stars
—	The restaurant did not receive a star that year
Closed	The restaurant is no longer open

Michelin-starred restaurants
Name	Cuisine	Location	2025	2026
Auberge de la Charme	Creative	Côte-d'Or – Prenois	1 Michelin star	1 Michelin star
Auprès du Clocher	Modern	Côte-d'Or – Pommard	—	1 Michelin star
Aux Terrasses	Creative	Saône-et-Loire – Tournus	1 Michelin star	1 Michelin star
Cédric Burtin	Creative	Côte-d'Or – Saint-Rémy	2 Michelin stars	2 Michelin stars
Château de Courban	Modern	Côte-d'Or – Courban	1 Michelin star	1 Michelin star
Château du Mont Joly	Modern	Jura – Sampans	1 Michelin star	1 Michelin star
CIBO	Modern	Côte-d'Or – Dijon	1 Michelin star	1 Michelin star
Clos du Cèdre	Modern	Côte-d'Or – Beaune	1 Michelin star	1 Michelin star
Ed.Em	Modern	Côte-d'Or – Chassagne-Montrachet	1 Michelin star	1 Michelin star
Erre	Creative	Saône-et-Loire – Chassy	—	1 Michelin star
Frédéric Doucet	Modern	Saône-et-Loire – Charolles	1 Michelin star	2 Michelin stars
L'Aspérule	Modern	Côte-d'Or – Dijon	1 Michelin star	1 Michelin star
L'Écrin de Yohann Chapuis	Creative	Saône-et-Loire – Tournus	1 Michelin star	1 Michelin star
L'Empreinte	French	Saône-et-Loire – Buxy	1 Michelin star	Closed
L'Étang du Moulin	Modern	Doubs – Bonnétage	1 Michelin star	1 Michelin star
L'O des Vignes	Modern	Saône-et-Loire – Fuissé	1 Michelin star	1 Michelin star
La Chaumière	Modern	Jura – Dole	1 Michelin star	1 Michelin star
La Côte d'Or	Modern	Côte-d'Or – Saulieu	2 Michelin stars	2 Michelin stars
La Côte Saint-Jacques	Modern	Yonne – Joigny	2 Michelin stars	2 Michelin stars
La Madeleine	Modern	Yonne – Sens	1 Michelin star	1 Michelin star
La Maison des Cariatides	Modern	Côte-d'Or – Dijon	—	1 Michelin star
La Marande	Modern	Saône-et-Loire – Montbellet	1 Michelin star	1 Michelin star
La Table d'Hôtes	Modern	Côte-d'Or – Gevrey-Chambertin	1 Michelin star	1 Michelin star
La Table de Chaintré	Modern	Saône-et-Loire – Chaintré	1 Michelin star	1 Michelin star
La Table du Grapiot	Modern	Jura – Pupillin	—	1 Michelin star
Le Bon Accueil	Modern	Doubs – Malbuisson	1 Michelin star	1 Michelin star
Le Carmin	Modern	Côte-d'Or – Beaune	1 Michelin star	1 Michelin star
Le Charlemagne	Creative	Côte-d'Or – Pernand-Vergelesses	1 Michelin star	1 Michelin star
Le Pot d'Étain	Modern	Territoire de Belfort – Danjoutin	1 Michelin star	1 Michelin star
Le Valucien	Modern	Yonne – Vault-de-Lugny	1 Michelin star	1 Michelin star
Loiseau des Ducs	Modern	Côte-d'Or – Dijon	1 Michelin star	1 Michelin star
Maison Lameloise	Modern	Saône-et-Loire – Chagny	3 Michelin stars	3 Michelin stars
Origine	Creative	Côte-d'Or – Dijon	1 Michelin star	1 Michelin star
Pierre	Modern	Saône-et-Loire – Mâcon	1 Michelin star	1 Michelin star
Table de Levernois	Modern	Côte-d'Or – Levernois	1 Michelin star	1 Michelin star
William Frachot	Modern	Côte-d'Or – Dijon	2 Michelin stars	2 Michelin stars
Reference(s)				

== Brittany ==
As of the 2026 guide, there are 36 restaurants with a Michelin-star rating in Brittany.

Key
1 Michelin star	One Michelin star
2 Michelin stars	Two Michelin stars
3 Michelin stars	Three Michelin stars
—	The restaurant did not receive a star that year

Michelin-starred restaurants
Name	Cuisine	Location	2025	2026
Allium	Creative	Finistère – Quimper	1 Michelin star	1 Michelin star
Ar Men Du	Modern	Finistère – Névez	1 Michelin star	1 Michelin star
Auberge du Pont d'Acigné	Creative	Ille-et-Vilaine – Noyal-sur-Vilaine	1 Michelin star	1 Michelin star
Auberge Grand'Maison	French	Côtes-d'Armor – Mûr-de-Bretagne	1 Michelin star	1 Michelin star
Aux Pesked	Seafood	Côtes-d'Armor – Saint-Brieuc	1 Michelin star	1 Michelin star
Avel Vor	Modern	Morbihan – Port-Louis	1 Michelin star	1 Michelin star
Côté Cuisine	Creative	Morbihan – Carnac	1 Michelin star	1 Michelin star
Hostellerie de la Pointe Saint-Mathieu	Modern	Finistère – Plougonvelin	1 Michelin star	1 Michelin star
Ima	Creative	Ille-et-Vilaine – Rennes	1 Michelin star	1 Michelin star
L'Anthocyane	Modern	Côtes-d'Armor – Lannion	1 Michelin star	1 Michelin star
L'Auberge des Glazicks	Creative	Finistère – Plomodiern	2 Michelin stars	2 Michelin stars
L'Embrun	Modern	Finistère – Brest	1 Michelin star	1 Michelin star
L'Inattendu	Modern	Morbihan – Kervignac	1 Michelin star	1 Michelin star
La Pomme d'Api	Creative	Finistère – Saint-Pol-de-Léon	1 Michelin star	1 Michelin star
La Table Breizh Café	Modern	Ille-et-Vilaine – Cancale	1 Michelin star	1 Michelin star
La Table d'Asten	Modern	Côtes-d'Armor – Binic	1 Michelin star	1 Michelin star
La Table de La Butte	Modern	Finistère – Plouider	1 Michelin star	1 Michelin star
La Table des Pères	Creative	Ille-et-Vilaine – Piré-Chancé	1 Michelin star	1 Michelin star
La Table Domaine du Liziec	Modern	Morbihan – Vannes	—	1 Michelin star
La Tête en l'air	Creative	Morbihan – Vannes	1 Michelin star	1 Michelin star
La Vieille Tour	Modern	Côtes-d'Armor – Plérin	1 Michelin star	1 Michelin star
Le Coquillage	Seafood	Ille-et-Vilaine – Saint-Méloir-des-Ondes	3 Michelin stars	3 Michelin stars
Le Gavrinis	Modern	Morbihan – Baden	1 Michelin star	1 Michelin star
Le Pressoir	Modern	Morbihan – Saint-Avé	1 Michelin star	1 Michelin star
Le Saint Placide	Modern	Ille-et-Vilaine – Saint-Malo	1 Michelin star	1 Michelin star
Les Trois Rochers	Creative	Finistère – Combrit	1 Michelin star	1 Michelin star
Louise	Modern	Morbihan – Lorient	1 Michelin star	1 Michelin star
Maison Ronan Kervarrec	Modern	Ille-et-Vilaine – Saint-Grégoire	2 Michelin stars	2 Michelin stars
Maison Tiegezh	Modern	Morbihan – Guer	1 Michelin star	1 Michelin star
Manoir de Lan-Kerellec	Seafood	Côtes-d'Armor – Trébeurden	1 Michelin star	1 Michelin star
Nicolas Carro	Creative	Finistère – Carantec	1 Michelin star	1 Michelin star
Nori (Note: Was named Le Brittany until 2026)	Japanese	Finistère – Roscoff	1 Michelin star	1 Michelin star
Nuance	Modern	Finistère – Plomeur	1 Michelin star	1 Michelin star
Pourquoi Pas	Modern	Ille-et-Vilaine – Dinard	1 Michelin star	1 Michelin star
Racines	Modern	Ille-et-Vilaine – Rennes	1 Michelin star	1 Michelin star
Rosmadec Le Moulin	Modern	Finistère – Pont-Aven	1 Michelin star	1 Michelin star
Reference(s)				

== Centre-Val de Loire ==
As of the 2026 guide, there are 19 restaurants with a Michelin-star rating in Centre-Val de Loire.

Key
1 Michelin star	One Michelin star
2 Michelin stars	Two Michelin stars
—	The restaurant did not receive a star that year

Michelin-starred restaurants
Name	Cuisine	Location	2025	2026
Arbore & Sens	Modern	Indre-et-Loire – Loches	1 Michelin star	1 Michelin star
Assa	Creative	Loir-et-Cher – Blois	1 Michelin star	1 Michelin star
Au 14 Fevrier	Modern	Indre – Saint-Valentin	1 Michelin star	—
Auberge des Templiers	Modern	Loiret – Boismorand	1 Michelin star	1 Michelin star
Auberge du XIIème Siècle	Modern	Indre-et-Loire – Saché	1 Michelin star	1 Michelin star
Auberge Pom'Poire	Modern	Indre-et-Loire – Azay-le-Rideau	1 Michelin star	1 Michelin star
Château de Pray	Modern	Indre-et-Loire – Amboise	1 Michelin star	1 Michelin star
Côté Jardin	Creative	Loiret – Gien	1 Michelin star	1 Michelin star
Ezia	Modern	Loir-et-Cher – Montlivault	1 Michelin star	1 Michelin star
Fleur de Loire	Creative	Loir-et-Cher – Blois	2 Michelin stars	2 Michelin stars
Grand Hôtel du Lion d'Or	Modern	Loir-et-Cher – Romorantin-Lanthenay	1 Michelin star	1 Michelin star
Granica (Note: Was named La Vieille Tour until 2026)	Modern	Loir-et-Cher – Cellettes	1 Michelin star	1 Michelin star
L'Évidence	Creative	Indre-et-Loire – Montbazon	1 Michelin star	1 Michelin star
L'Opidom	Creative	Indre-et-Loire – Fondettes	1 Michelin star	1 Michelin star
La Promenade (Maison Dallais)	Modern	Indre-et-Loire – Le Petit-Pressigny	1 Michelin star	1 Michelin star
La Table de Christophe Hay et Loïs Bée	Modern	Loiret – Ardon	1 Michelin star	1 Michelin star
La Pomme d'Or	Modern	Cher – Sancerre	1 Michelin star	1 Michelin star
Le Favori	Modern	Loir-et-Cher – Cheverny	1 Michelin star	1 Michelin star
Le Georges	Creative	Eure-et-Loir – Chartres	1 Michelin star	1 Michelin star
Le Lièvre Gourmand	Creative	Loiret – Orléans	1 Michelin star	—
Maison Medard	Modern	Cher – Boulleret	1 Michelin star	1 Michelin star
Reference(s)				

== Corsica ==
As of the 2026 guide, there are 6 restaurants with a Michelin-star rating in Corsica.

Key
1 Michelin star	One Michelin star
2 Michelin stars	Two Michelin stars

Michelin-starred restaurants
Name	Cuisine	Location	2025	2026
A Casa di Mà	Modern	Haute-Corse – Lumio	1 Michelin star	1 Michelin star
Casadelmar	Modern	Corse-du-Sud – Porto-Vecchio	2 Michelin stars	2 Michelin stars
Finestra	Italian	Corse-du-Sud – Bonifacio	1 Michelin star	1 Michelin star
La Verrière	Modern	Corse-du-Sud – Olmeto	1 Michelin star	1 Michelin star
La Table de la Ferme	Corsican	Corse-du-Sud – Sartène	1 Michelin star	1 Michelin star
Le Charlie	Modern	Corse-du-Sud – Porticcio	1 Michelin star	1 Michelin star
Reference				

== Grand Est ==
As of the 2026 guide, there are 59 restaurants with a Michelin-star rating in Grand Est, which includes the city of Strasbourg.

Key
1 Michelin star	One Michelin star
2 Michelin stars	Two Michelin stars
3 Michelin stars	Three Michelin stars
—	The restaurant did not receive a star that year

Michelin-starred restaurants
Name	Cuisine	Location	2025	2026
1741	Modern	Bas-Rhin – Strasbourg	1 Michelin star	1 Michelin star
Alchémille	Creative	Haut-Rhin – Kaysersberg	1 Michelin star	1 Michelin star
Alcôve	Creative	Marne – Vinay	—	1 Michelin star
Alexis Baudin	Modern	Moselle – Malling	—	1 Michelin star
Arbane	Creative	Marne – Reims	1 Michelin star	2 Michelin stars
Assiette Champenoise	Modern	Marne – Reims	3 Michelin stars	3 Michelin stars
Au Crocodile	Modern	Bas-Rhin – Strasbourg	1 Michelin star	1 Michelin star
Au Gourmet	Modern	Bas-Rhin – Drusenheim	1 Michelin star	1 Michelin star
Auberge au Bœuf	Modern	Bas-Rhin – Sessenheim	1 Michelin star	—
Auberge Chez Guth	Creative	Bas-Rhin – Steige	1 Michelin star	1 Michelin star
Auberge de l'Ill	French	Haut-Rhin – Illhaeusern	2 Michelin stars	2 Michelin stars
Auberge Frankenbourg	Modern	Bas-Rhin – La Vancelle	1 Michelin star	1 Michelin star
Auberge Saint-Laurent	French	Haut-Rhin – Sierentz	1 Michelin star	1 Michelin star
Auberge Saint-Walfrid	French	Moselle – Sarreguemines	1 Michelin star	1 Michelin star
Aux Vieux Couvent	Modern	Bas-Rhin – Rhinau	1 Michelin star	1 Michelin star
Bulle d'Osier	Creative	Haute-Marne – Langres	1 Michelin star	2 Michelin stars
Burnel	Modern	Vosges – Rouvres-en-Xaintois	1 Michelin star	1 Michelin star
Château d'Adoménil	Modern	Meurthe-et-Moselle – Lunéville	1 Michelin star	1 Michelin star
Cheval Blanc	Modern	Bas-Rhin – Lembach	1 Michelin star	1 Michelin star
Chez Michèle	Modern	Moselle – Languimberg	1 Michelin star	1 Michelin star
De:ja	Creative	Bas-Rhin – Strasbourg	1 Michelin star	1 Michelin star
Enfin	Nordic	Bas-Rhin – Barr	1 Michelin star	1 Michelin star
Hostellerie la Montagne	Modern	Haute-Marne – Colombey-les-Deux-Églises	1 Michelin star	1 Michelin star
Il Cortile	Mediterranean	Haut-Rhin – Mulhouse	1 Michelin star	1 Michelin star
Jérôme Feck	Creative	Marne – Châlons-en-Champagne	1 Michelin star	1 Michelin star
Jy's	French	Haut-Rhin – Colmar	2 Michelin stars	2 Michelin stars
Kasbür	Modern	Bas-Rhin – Monswiller	1 Michelin star	1 Michelin star
L'Arnsbourg	Modern	Moselle – Baerenthal	1 Michelin star	1 Michelin star
L'Atelier du Peintre	Modern	Haut-Rhin – Colmar	1 Michelin star	1 Michelin star
L'Orchidée	Thai	Haut-Rhin – Ensisheim	1 Michelin star	1 Michelin star
La Cheneaudière	Modern	Bas-Rhin – Colroy-la-Roche	1 Michelin star	1 Michelin star
La Fourchette des Ducs	Creative	Bas-Rhin – Obernai	2 Michelin stars	2 Michelin stars
La Maison dans le Parc	Creative	Meurthe-et-Moselle – Nancy	1 Michelin star	1 Michelin star
La Merise	Creative	Bas-Rhin – Laubach	2 Michelin stars	2 Michelin stars
La Nouvelle Auberge	Modern	Haut-Rhin – Wihr-au-Val	1 Michelin star	1 Michelin star
La Table d'Olivier Nasti	Creative	Haut-Rhin – Kaysersberg	2 Michelin stars	2 Michelin stars
La Table du Gourmet	Creative	Haut-Rhin – Riquewihr	1 Michelin star	1 Michelin star
Le 7ème Continent	French	Haut-Rhin – Rixheim	1 Michelin star	1 Michelin star
Le Cerf	Modern	Bas-Rhin – Marlenheim	1 Michelin star	1 Michelin star
Le Grand Cerf	French	Marne – Montchenot	1 Michelin star	1 Michelin star
Le Jardin Secret	Modern	Bas-Rhin – La Wantzenau	1 Michelin star	1 Michelin star
Le K	Modern	Moselle – Montenach	1 Michelin star	1 Michelin star
Le M	Modern	Vosges – Ventron	—	1 Michelin star
Le Millénaire	Modern	Marne – Reims	1 Michelin star	1 Michelin star
Le Parc Les Crayères	Modern	Marne – Reims	2 Michelin stars	2 Michelin stars
Le Relais de la Poste	Modern	Bas-Rhin – La Wantzenau	1 Michelin star	1 Michelin star
Le Royal	Creative	Marne – Champillon	1 Michelin star	1 Michelin star
Les Ducs de Lorraine	Modern	Vosges – Epinal	1 Michelin star	1 Michelin star
Les Funambules	Modern	Bas-Rhin – Strasbourg	1 Michelin star	1 Michelin star
Les Plaisirs Gourmands	Modern	Bas-Rhin – Strasbourg	1 Michelin star	1 Michelin star
Quai des Saveurs	Modern	Moselle – Hagondange	1 Michelin star	1 Michelin star
Racine	Creative	Marne – Reims	2 Michelin stars	2 Michelin stars
Restaurant Girardin	Creative	Haut-Rhin – Colmar	1 Michelin star	1 Michelin star
Restaurant Julien Binz	Modern	Haut-Rhin – Ammerschwihr	1 Michelin star	1 Michelin star
Thierry Schwartz	Creative	Bas-Rhin – Obernai	1 Michelin star	1 Michelin star
Timilìa	Italian	Moselle – Metz	—	1 Michelin star
Toya	Creative	Moselle – Faulquemont	1 Michelin star	1 Michelin star
Umami	Modern	Bas-Rhin – Strasbourg	1 Michelin star	1 Michelin star
Villa René Lalique	Creative	Bas-Rhin – Wingen-sur-Moder	2 Michelin stars	2 Michelin stars
Yozora	Japanese	Moselle – Metz	1 Michelin star	1 Michelin star
Reference(s)				

== Hauts-de-France ==
As of the 2026 guide, there are 18 restaurants with a Michelin-star rating in Hauts-de-France.

Key
1 Michelin star	One Michelin star
2 Michelin stars	Two Michelin stars
—	The restaurant did not receive a star that year

Michelin-starred restaurants
Name	Cuisine	Location	2025	2026
Arborescence	Creative	Somme – Croixrault	1 Michelin star	1 Michelin star
Auberge de la Grive	Modern	Aisne – Trosly-Loire	1 Michelin star	1 Michelin star
Auberge du Vert Mont	Creative	Nord – Boeschepe	1 Michelin star	1 Michelin star
Bacôve	Modern	Pas-de-Calais – Saint-Omer	1 Michelin star	1 Michelin star
Château de Courcelles	Modern	Aisne – Courcelles-sur-Vesle	1 Michelin star	1 Michelin star
Ginko	Modern	Nord – Lille	1 Michelin star	1 Michelin star
Harmonie	Creative	Nord – Villeneuve-d'Ascq	—	1 Michelin star
Haut Bonheur de la Table	Modern	Nord – Cassel	1 Michelin star	1 Michelin star
L’Orée de la Forêt	Modern	Oise – Étouy	1 Michelin star	1 Michelin star
La Grange de Belle-Église	French	Oise – Bornel	1 Michelin star	1 Michelin star
La Grenouillère	Creative	Pas-de-Calais – La Madelaine-sous-Montreuil	2 Michelin stars	2 Michelin stars
La Table	French	Nord – Lille	1 Michelin star	—
La Table de Christophe Dufossé (Note: Was named Château de Beaulieu – Christophe Dufossé until 2026)	Modern	Pas-de-Calais – Busnes	2 Michelin stars	2 Michelin stars
Le Camélia	Modern	Nord – Bry	—	1 Michelin star
Le Cerisier	Creative	Nord – Lille	1 Michelin star	1 Michelin star
Le Pavillon	Creative	Pas-de-Calais – Le Touquet	1 Michelin star	1 Michelin star
Le Verbois	Modern	Oise – Saint-Maximin	1 Michelin star	1 Michelin star
Pureté	Modern	Nord – Lille	1 Michelin star	1 Michelin star
Rozó	Creative	Nord – Marcq-en-Barœul	2 Michelin stars	2 Michelin stars
Reference(s)				

== Île-de-France and Paris ==
As of the 2026 guide, there are 142 restaurants with a Michelin-star rating in Île-de-France, which includes the city of Paris. 127 of the restaurants are within Paris city limits, while 15 are in the remainder of the region.

Key
1 Michelin star	One Michelin star
2 Michelin stars	Two Michelin stars
—	The restaurant did not receive a star that year
Closed	The restaurant is no longer open

Michelin-starred restaurants
Name	Cuisine	Location	2025	2026
Auberge de la Brie	Modern	Seine-et-Marne – Couilly-Pont-aux-Dames	1 Michelin star	1 Michelin star
Ducasse au Château de Versailles	French	Yvelines – Versailles	1 Michelin star	1 Michelin star
Gordon Ramsay au Trianon	Creative	Yvelines – Versailles	1 Michelin star	1 Michelin star
L'Axel	Modern	Seine-et-Marne – Fontainebleau	1 Michelin star	1 Michelin star
L'Escarbille	French	Hauts-de-Seine – Meudon	1 Michelin star	1 Michelin star
L'Or Q'idée	Creative	Val-d'Oise – Pontoise	1 Michelin star	1 Michelin star
L'Ours	Modern	Val-de-Marne – Vincennes	1 Michelin star	1 Michelin star
La Table du 11	Modern	Yvelines – Versailles	1 Michelin star	1 Michelin star
La Vieille Auberge	Modern	Seine-et-Marne – Villeneuve-le-Comte	1 Michelin star	1 Michelin star
Le Corot	Creative	Hauts-de-Seine – Ville-d'Avray	1 Michelin star	2 Michelin stars
Le Panoramique	Modern	Yvelines – Rolleboise	1 Michelin star	1 Michelin star
Le Village Tomohiro	Creative	Yvelines – Marly-le-Roi	1 Michelin star	—
Maison Avoise	Modern	Hauts-de-Seine – Issy-les-Moulineaux	1 Michelin star	1 Michelin star
Numéro 3	Modern	Yvelines – Le Tremblay-sur-Mauldre	1 Michelin star	Closed
Ochre	Modern	Hauts-de-Seine – Rueil-Malmaison	1 Michelin star	1 Michelin star
Ruche	Creative	Yvelines – Gambais	—	1 Michelin star
Villa9Trois	Modern	Seine-Saint-Denis – Montreuil	1 Michelin star	1 Michelin star
Reference(s)				

== Normandy ==
As of the 2026 guide, there are 18 restaurants with a Michelin-star rating in Normandy.

Key
1 Michelin star	One Michelin star

Michelin-starred restaurants
Name	Cuisine	Location	2025	2026
Auberge de la Mine	French	Orne – La Ferrière-aux-Étangs	1 Michelin star	1 Michelin star
Auberge Sauvage	Creative	Manche – Servon	1 Michelin star	1 Michelin star
G.a. au Manoir de Rétival	Modern	Seine-Maritime – Rives-en-Seine	1 Michelin star	1 Michelin star
Intuition	Modern	Manche – Saint-Lô	1 Michelin star	1 Michelin star
Ivan Vautier	Modern	Calvados – Caen	1 Michelin star	1 Michelin star
Jean-Luc Tartarin	Creative	Seine-Maritime – Le Havre	1 Michelin star	1 Michelin star
L’Essentiel	Modern	Calvados – Deauville	1 Michelin star	1 Michelin star
L’Odas	Creative	Seine-Maritime – Rouen	1 Michelin star	1 Michelin star
La Licorne Royale	Modern	Eure – Lyons-la-Forêt	1 Michelin star	1 Michelin star
La Renaissance	Modern	Orne – Argentan	1 Michelin star	1 Michelin star
Le Jardin des Plumes	Creative	Eure – Giverny	1 Michelin star	1 Michelin star
Le Manoir du Lys	Modern	Orne – Juvigny-Val-d'Andaine	1 Michelin star	1 Michelin star
Le Mascaret	Modern	Manche – Blainville-sur-Mer	1 Michelin star	1 Michelin star
Le Pily	Creative	Manche – Cherbourg-en-Cotentin	1 Michelin star	1 Michelin star
Les Voiles d’Or	Modern	Seine-Maritime – Dieppe	1 Michelin star	1 Michelin star
Maison Caillet	Creative	Seine-Maritime – Valmont	1 Michelin star	1 Michelin star
Maximin Hellio	Modern	Calvados – Deauville	1 Michelin star	1 Michelin star
Symbiose	Modern	Calvados – Cabourg	1 Michelin star	1 Michelin star
Reference(s)				

== Nouvelle-Aquitaine ==
As of the 2026 guide, there are 60 restaurants with a Michelin-star rating in Nouvelle-Aquitaine, which includes the Bordeaux region.

Key
1 Michelin star	One Michelin star
2 Michelin stars	Two Michelin stars
3 Michelin stars	Three Michelin stars
—	The restaurant did not receive a star that year
Closed	The restaurant is no longer open

Michelin-starred restaurants
Name	Cuisine	Location	2025	2026
Amicis	Creative	Gironde – Bordeaux	1 Michelin star	1 Michelin star
Auberge Le Prieuré	Creative	Lot-et-Garonne – Moirax	1 Michelin star	1 Michelin star
Aumi	Modern	Charente – Puymoyen	1 Michelin star	1 Michelin star
Briketenia	Modern	Pyrénées-Atlantiques – Guéthary	1 Michelin star	1 Michelin star
Cent33	Creative	Gironde – Bordeaux	—	1 Michelin star
Choko Ona	Basque	Pyrénées-Atlantiques – Espelette	1 Michelin star	1 Michelin star
Christopher Coutanceau	Seafood	Charente-Maritime – La Rochelle	3 Michelin stars	3 Michelin stars
Cueillette	Creative	Corrèze – Altillac	1 Michelin star	1 Michelin star
Dyades	Modern	Charente – Massignac	1 Michelin star	1 Michelin star
Ekaitza	Creative	Pyrénées-Atlantiques – Ciboure	2 Michelin stars	2 Michelin stars
Ithurria	Basque	Pyrénées-Atlantiques – Ainhoa	1 Michelin star	1 Michelin star
L'Aquarelle	French	Charente-Maritime – Breuillet	1 Michelin star	Closed
L'Auberge Saint Jean	Modern	Gironde – Saint-Jean-de-Blaignac	1 Michelin star	1 Michelin star
L'Écailler	Seafood	Charente-Maritime – La Flotte	—	1 Michelin star
L'Essentiel	Modern	Dordogne – Périgueux	1 Michelin star	1 Michelin star
L'Hysope	Creative	Charente-Maritime – La Jarrie	1 Michelin star	—
L'Impertinent	Creative	Pyrénées-Atlantiques – Biarritz	1 Michelin star	1 Michelin star
L'Observatoire du Gabriel	Modern	Gironde – Bordeaux	2 Michelin stars	2 Michelin stars
L'Oiseau Bleu	Modern	Gironde – Bordeaux	1 Michelin star	1 Michelin star
L'Orangerie	French	Landes – Eugénie-les-Bains	1 Michelin star	1 Michelin star
La Chapelle Saint-Martin	Modern	Haute-Vienne – Nieul	1 Michelin star	1 Michelin star
La Grand'Vigne	Modern	Gironde – Martillac	2 Michelin stars	2 Michelin stars
La Maison de Pierre	Basque	Pyrénées-Atlantiques – Hasparren	1 Michelin star	1 Michelin star
La Ribaudière	Modern	Charente – Bourg-Charente	1 Michelin star	1 Michelin star
La Table d'Aurélien Largeau	Modern	Pyrénées-Atlantiques – Biarritz	1 Michelin star	1 Michelin star
La Table d'Hotes	Modern	Gironde – Bordeaux	1 Michelin star	1 Michelin star
La Table d'Olivier	Creative	Corrèze – Brive-la-Gaillarde	1 Michelin star	1 Michelin star
La Table de Cédric Béchade	Basque	Pyrénées-Atlantiques – Saint-Pée-sur-Nivelle	1 Michelin star	1 Michelin star
La Table de Pavie	Creative	Gironde – Saint-Emilion	2 Michelin stars	2 Michelin stars
La Table Mirasol	Peruvian	Landes – Mont-de-Marsan	1 Michelin star	1 Michelin star
La Tour des Vents	Modern	Dordogne – Monbazillac	1 Michelin star	1 Michelin star
Lalique	Creative	Gironde – Bommes	2 Michelin stars	2 Michelin stars
Le 1862	Modern	Dordogne – Les Eyzies	1 Michelin star	1 Michelin star
Le Cercle Guiraud	Modern	Gironde – Sauternes	—	1 Michelin star
Le Hittau	Modern	Landes – Saint-Vincent-de-Tyrosse	1 Michelin star	1 Michelin star
Le Kaïku	Basque	Pyrénées-Atlantiques – Saint-Jean-de-Luz	1 Michelin star	1 Michelin star
Le Moulin de l'Abbaye	Modern	Dordogne – Brantôme	1 Michelin star	1 Michelin star
Le Moulin de la Gorce	French	Haute-Vienne – La Roche-l'Abeille	1 Michelin star	Closed
Le Patio	French	Gironde – Arcachon	1 Michelin star	1 Michelin star
Le Pavillon des Boulevards	Modern	Gironde – Bordeaux	1 Michelin star	1 Michelin star
Le Petit Leon	Modern	Dordogne – Saint-Léon-sur-Vézère	1 Michelin star	1 Michelin star
Le Pressoir d'Argent	Modern	Gironde – Bordeaux	2 Michelin stars	2 Michelin stars
Le Prince Noir	Modern	Gironde – Lormont	1 Michelin star	1 Michelin star
Le Saint-James	Creative	Gironde – Bouliac	1 Michelin star	1 Michelin star
Le Skiff Club	Modern	Gironde – Pyla-sur-Mer	2 Michelin stars	2 Michelin stars
Le Vieux Logis	Modern	Dordogne – Trémolat	1 Michelin star	1 Michelin star
Les Belles Perdrix	Modern	Gironde – Saint-Emilion	1 Michelin star	1 Michelin star
Les Foudres	French	Gironde – Arcachon	1 Michelin star	1 Michelin star
Les Frères Ibarboure	Basque	Pyrénées-Atlantiques – Bidart	1 Michelin star	1 Michelin star
Les Fresques	Modern	Dordogne – Monestier	1 Michelin star	1 Michelin star
Les Prés d'Eugénie	French	Landes – Eugénie-les-Bains	3 Michelin stars	3 Michelin stars
Les Rosiers	French	Pyrénées-Atlantiques – Biarritz	1 Michelin star	Closed
Les Sources de Fontbelle	French	Charente – Angoulême	1 Michelin star	Closed
Logis de la Cadène	Modern	Gironde – Saint-Emilion	1 Michelin star	1 Michelin star
Lore Ttipia	Basque	Pyrénées-Atlantiques – Bidarray	1 Michelin star	1 Michelin star
Maison Nouvelle	Modern	Gironde – Bordeaux	2 Michelin stars	2 Michelin stars
Michel Trama	French	Lot-et-Garonne – Puymirol	1 Michelin star	Closed
Moulin d'Alotz	Vegetarian	Pyrénées-Atlantiques – Arcangues	1 Michelin star	1 Michelin star
Moulin de la Tardoire	Modern	Charente – Montbron	1 Michelin star	1 Michelin star
Nacre	Modern	Gironde – Arès	1 Michelin star	1 Michelin star
Notes	Modern	Charente – Cognac	—	1 Michelin star
Relais de la Poste	French	Landes – Magescq	2 Michelin stars	1 Michelin star
Ressources	Modern	Gironde – Bordeaux	1 Michelin star	1 Michelin star
Soléna	Modern	Gironde – Bordeaux	1 Michelin star	1 Michelin star
Tentazioni	Italian	Gironde – Bordeaux	1 Michelin star	1 Michelin star
Villa de l'Étang Blanc	Modern	Landes – Seignosse	1 Michelin star	1 Michelin star
Reference(s)				

== Occitania ==
As of the 2026 guide, there are 56 restaurants with a Michelin-star rating in Occitania, which includes the cities of Montpellier and Toulouse.

Key
1 Michelin star	One Michelin star
2 Michelin stars	Two Michelin stars
3 Michelin stars	Three Michelin stars
—	The restaurant did not receive a star that year
Closed	The restaurant is no longer open

Michelin-starred restaurants
Name	Cuisine	Location	2025	2026
Acte 2 Yannick Delpech	Modern	Haute-Garonne – Toulouse	1 Michelin star	1 Michelin star
Agapes	Modern	Haute-Garonne – Toulouse	—	1 Michelin star
Auberge de la Forge	Modern	Haute-Garonne – Lavalette	1 Michelin star	1 Michelin star
Auberge du Vieux Puits	Creative	Aude – Fontjoncouse	3 Michelin stars	3 Michelin stars
Calice	Modern	Hérault – Béziers	1 Michelin star	1 Michelin star
Château de la Treyne	Modern	Lot – Lacave	1 Michelin star	1 Michelin star
Cyril Attrazic	Creative	Lozère – Aumont-Aubrac	2 Michelin stars	2 Michelin stars
Duende	Modern	Gard – Nîmes	2 Michelin stars	2 Michelin stars
Ebullition	Creative	Hérault – Montpellier	1 Michelin star	1 Michelin star
Émilie & Thomas	Modern	Aveyron – Conques-en-Rouergue	1 Michelin star	1 Michelin star
En Marge	Modern	Haute-Garonne – Aureville	1 Michelin star	1 Michelin star
En Pleine Nature	Modern	Haute-Garonne – Quint-Fonsegrives	1 Michelin star	1 Michelin star
Fario	Modern	Pyrénées-Orientales – Céret	1 Michelin star	1 Michelin star
Granit	Modern	Hérault – Colombières-sur-Orb	1 Michelin star	1 Michelin star
Holodeck	Modern	Lot – Floressas	—	1 Michelin star
Jardin des Sens	Modern	Hérault – Montpellier	1 Michelin star	1 Michelin star
Jerome Nutile	Modern	Gard – Nîmes	1 Michelin star	1 Michelin star
L'Almandin	Modern	Pyrénées-Orientales – Saint-Cyprien	1 Michelin star	1 Michelin star
L'Alter-Native	Seafood	Hérault – Béziers	1 Michelin star	1 Michelin star
L'Aparté	Modern	Haute-Garonne – Montrabé	1 Michelin star	1 Michelin star
L'Écorce	Modern	Haute-Garonne – Toulouse	—	1 Michelin star
La Balette	Creative	Pyrénées-Orientales – Collioure	1 Michelin star	1 Michelin star
La Belle Vie	Modern	Gard – Saint-Hilaire-d'Ozilhan	—	1 Michelin star
La Coopérative	Modern	Ariège – Bélesta	1 Michelin star	—
La Galinette	Creative	Pyrénées-Orientales – Perpignan	1 Michelin star	1 Michelin star
La Maison Despouès	Modern	Gers – Puylausic	1 Michelin star	1 Michelin star
La Reserve Rimbaud	Modern	Hérault – Montpellier	1 Michelin star	1 Michelin star
La Table d'Uzès	Modern	Gard – Uzès	1 Michelin star	1 Michelin star
La Table de Franck Putelat	Modern	Aude – Carcassonne	2 Michelin stars	2 Michelin stars
La Table Lionel Giraud	Creative	Aude – Narbonne	2 Michelin stars	2 Michelin stars
Le Cèdre de Montcaud	Modern	Gard – Sabran	1 Michelin star	1 Michelin star
Le Gindreau	Modern	Lot – Saint-Médard	1 Michelin star	1 Michelin star
Le Grand Cap	Modern	Aude – Leucate	1 Michelin star	1 Michelin star
Le Pont de l'Ouysse	French	Lot – Lacave	1 Michelin star	—
Le Prieuré	Creative	Gard – Villeneuve-lès-Avignon	1 Michelin star	1 Michelin star
Le Puits du Trésor	Modern	Aude – Lastours	1 Michelin star	1 Michelin star
Le Puits Saint Jacques	Modern	Gers – Pujaudran	1 Michelin star	1 Michelin star
Le Saint Hilaire	Modern	Gard – Saint-Hilaire-de-Brethmas	1 Michelin star	1 Michelin star
Le Suquet (Note: Was named Bras until 2026)	Creative	Aveyron – Laguiole	2 Michelin stars	1 Michelin star
Leclere	Modern	Hérault – Montpellier	1 Michelin star	1 Michelin star
Les Jardins	Creative	Lot – Parnac	—	1 Michelin star
Les Jardins de l'Opéra	Modern	Haute-Garonne – Toulouse	1 Michelin star	1 Michelin star
Les Trois Soleils de Montal	Modern	Lot – Saint-Céré	1 Michelin star	1 Michelin star
Maison Chenet	Modern	Gard – Pujaut	1 Michelin star	1 Michelin star
Maison Pellestor Veyrier	Modern	Haute-Garonne – Colomiers	—	1 Michelin star
Michel Sarran	Mediterranean	Haute-Garonne – Toulouse	1 Michelin star	1 Michelin star
Monique	Modern	Gard – Calvisson	1 Michelin star	1 Michelin star
Ô Saveurs	Modern	Haute-Garonne – Rouffiac-Tolosan	1 Michelin star	—
Pastis	Modern	Hérault – Montpellier	1 Michelin star	1 Michelin star
Py-r	Creative	Haute-Garonne – Toulouse	2 Michelin stars	2 Michelin stars
Reflet d'Obione	Mediterranean	Hérault – Montpellier	1 Michelin star	1 Michelin star
Restaurant Alexandre	Modern	Gard – Garons	2 Michelin stars	2 Michelin stars
Restaurant de Lauzun	Mediterranean	Hérault – Pézenas	1 Michelin star	1 Michelin star
Restaurant Hervé Busset	Modern	Aveyron – Rodez	1 Michelin star	1 Michelin star
Rouge	Creative	Gard – Nîmes	1 Michelin star	1 Michelin star
Sept	Japanese	Haute-Garonne – Toulouse	1 Michelin star	1 Michelin star
Skab	Modern	Gard – Nîmes	1 Michelin star	1 Michelin star
The Marcel	French	Hérault – Sète	1 Michelin star	Closed
Vieux Pont	Modern	Aveyron – Belcastel	1 Michelin star	1 Michelin star
Villa Pinewood	Creative	Tarn – Payrin-Augmontel	1 Michelin star	1 Michelin star
Reference(s)				

== Pays de la Loire ==
As of the 2026 guide, there are 23 restaurants with a Michelin-star rating in Pays de la Loire, which includes the city of Nantes.

Key
1 Michelin star	One Michelin star
2 Michelin stars	Two Michelin stars
3 Michelin stars	Three Michelin stars
—	The restaurant did not receive a star that year

Michelin-starred restaurants
Name	Cuisine	Location	2025	2026
Anne de Bretagne	Creative	Loire-Atlantique – La Plaine-sur-Mer	2 Michelin stars	2 Michelin stars
Fontevraud le Restaurant	Creative	Maine-et-Loire – Fontevraud-l'Abbaye	1 Michelin star	1 Michelin star
Freia	Creative	Loire-Atlantique – Nantes	1 Michelin star	1 Michelin star
Jean-Marc Pérochon	Modern	Vendée – Bretignolles-sur-Mer	1 Michelin star	1 Michelin star
L’Abissiou	Modern	Vendée – Les Sables-d'Olonne	1 Michelin star	1 Michelin star
L’Atlantide 1874 – Maison Guého	Modern	Loire-Atlantique – Nantes	1 Michelin star	1 Michelin star
L’Auberge de Bagatelle	Modern	Sarthe – Le Mans	1 Michelin star	1 Michelin star
L’Éveil des Sens	Modern	Mayenne – Commune Mayenne	1 Michelin star	1 Michelin star
La Chabotterie	Modern	Vendée – Montréverd	1 Michelin star	1 Michelin star
La Mare aux Oiseaux	Creative	Loire-Atlantique – Saint-Joachim	1 Michelin star	1 Michelin star
La Marine	Creative	Vendée – Noirmoutier-en-l'Île	3 Michelin stars	3 Michelin stars
La Robe	Modern	Vendée – Montaigu-Vendée	1 Michelin star	1 Michelin star
La Table de la Bergerie	Modern	Maine-et-Loire – Terranjou	1 Michelin star	1 Michelin star
Lait Thym Sel	Creative	Maine-et-Loire – Angers	1 Michelin star	1 Michelin star
Le 1201 (Note: Was named L’Épicurien – Abbaye de Villeneuve until 2026)	Modern	Loire-Atlantique – Les Sorinières	1 Michelin star	1 Michelin star
Le Manoir de la Régate	Modern	Loire-Atlantique – Nantes	1 Michelin star	1 Michelin star
Les Cadets	Modern	Loire-Atlantique – Nantes	1 Michelin star	1 Michelin star
Les Genêts	Creative	Vendée – Brem-sur-Mer	1 Michelin star	1 Michelin star
Les Reflets	Modern	Vendée – La Roche-sur-Yon	1 Michelin star	1 Michelin star
Lueurs	Modern	Maine-et-Loire – Bouchemaine	—	1 Michelin star
Lulu Rouget	Modern	Loire-Atlantique – Nantes	1 Michelin star	1 Michelin star
Maison Desamy	Modern	Vendée – Mareuil-sur-Lay-Dissais	1 Michelin star	1 Michelin star
Omija	Creative	Loire-Atlantique – Nantes	1 Michelin star	1 Michelin star
Reference(s)				

== Provence-Alpes-Côte d'Azur ==
As of the 2026 guide, there are 82 restaurants with a Michelin-star rating in Provence-Alpes-Côte d'Azur, which includes the cities of Marseille and Nice.

Key
1 Michelin star	One Michelin star
2 Michelin stars	Two Michelin stars
3 Michelin stars	Three Michelin stars
—	The restaurant did not receive a star that year
Closed	The restaurant is no longer open

Michelin-starred restaurants
Name	Cuisine	Location	2025	2026
Alain Llorca	French	Alpes-Maritimes – La Colle-sur-Loup	1 Michelin star	1 Michelin star
AM par Alexandre Mazzia	Creative	Bouches-du-Rhône – Marseille	3 Michelin stars	3 Michelin stars
Arnaud Donckele & Maxime Frédéric	Mediterranean	Var – Saint-Tropez	1 Michelin star	1 Michelin star
Auberge de la Roche	Modern	Alpes-Maritimes – Valdeblore	—	1 Michelin star
Auberge Quintessence	Modern	Alpes-Maritimes – Roubion	1 Michelin star	1 Michelin star
Auffo	Modern	Bouches-du-Rhône – Marseille	—	1 Michelin star
Belle de Mars	Modern	Bouches-du-Rhône – Marseille	1 Michelin star	1 Michelin star
Bessem	Mediterranean	Alpes-Maritimes – Mandelieu-la-Napoule	1 Michelin star	1 Michelin star
Bruno	French	Var – Lorgues	1 Michelin star	1 Michelin star
Chateau Eza	Modern	Alpes-Maritimes – Èze	1 Michelin star	1 Michelin star
Chez Jeannette	Modern	Var – Flassans-sur-Issole	1 Michelin star	1 Michelin star
Colette	Modern	Var – Saint-Tropez	1 Michelin star	1 Michelin star
Couleurs de Shimatani	Mediterranean / Japanese	Bouches-du-Rhône – La Ciotat	1 Michelin star	1 Michelin star
Dan B.	Modern	Bouches-du-Rhône – Ventabren	1 Michelin star	1 Michelin star
Épicentre	Modern	Alpes-Maritimes – Nice	—	1 Michelin star
Etude	Modern	Bouches-du-Rhône – Aix-en-Provence	1 Michelin star	1 Michelin star
Faventia	Modern	Var – Tourrettes	1 Michelin star	1 Michelin star
Flaveur	Creative	Alpes-Maritimes – Nice	2 Michelin stars	2 Michelin stars
Garrigue	Modern	Vaucluse – Ansouis	—	1 Michelin star
Hélène Darroze à Villa La Coste	French	Bouches-du-Rhône – Le Puy	1 Michelin star	Closed
JAN	Creative	Alpes-Maritimes – Nice	1 Michelin star	1 Michelin star
JU	Modern	Vaucluse – Bonnieux	1 Michelin star	1 Michelin star
Ineffable	Modern	Bouches-du-Rhône – Barbentane	1 Michelin star	1 Michelin star
L'Arbre au Soleil	Modern	Var – Le Lavandou	1 Michelin star	Closed
L'Aromate	Modern	Alpes-Maritimes – Nice	1 Michelin star	1 Michelin star
L'Auberge de Saint-Rémy	Modern	Bouches-du-Rhône – Saint-Rémy-de-Provence	2 Michelin stars	2 Michelin stars
L'Aupiho	Modern	Bouches-du-Rhône – Les Baux-de-Provence	1 Michelin star	1 Michelin star
L'Or Bleu	Modern	Alpes-Maritimes – Théoule-sur-Mer	1 Michelin star	1 Michelin star
L'Oursin	Creative	Bouches-du-Rhône – Carry-le-Rouet	—	1 Michelin star
L'Oursin (Hotel Les Roches)	Mediterranean	Var – Le Lavandou	—	1 Michelin star
L'Oustalet	Modern	Vaucluse – Gigondas	1 Michelin star	1 Michelin star
L'Oustau de Baumanière	Creative	Bouches-du-Rhône – Les Baux-de-Provence	3 Michelin stars	3 Michelin stars
La Bastide	French	Vaucluse – Bonnieux	1 Michelin star	1 Michelin star
La Bastide Bourrelly	French	Bouches-du-Rhône – Cabriès	1 Michelin star	1 Michelin star
La Bastide de Moustiers	Mediterranean	Alpes-de-Haute-Provence – Moustiers	1 Michelin star	1 Michelin star
La Bonne Etape	French	Alpes-de-Haute-Provence – Château-Arnoux	1 Michelin star	1 Michelin star
La Chassagnette	Creative	Bouches-du-Rhône – Arles	1 Michelin star	1 Michelin star
La Chèvre d'Or	Creative	Alpes-Maritimes – Èze	2 Michelin stars	2 Michelin stars
La Closerie	French	Vaucluse – Ansouis	1 Michelin star	Closed
La Flibuste	Modern	Alpes-Maritimes – Villeneuve-Loubet	1 Michelin star	1 Michelin star
La Magdeleine	Mediterranean	Bouches-du-Rhône – Gémenos	1 Michelin star	—
La Mère Germaine	French	Vaucluse – Châteauneuf-du-Pape	1 Michelin star	—
La Mirande	French	Vaucluse – Avignon	1 Michelin star	—
La Palme d'Or	Modern	Alpes-Maritimes – Cannes	1 Michelin star	1 Michelin star
La Palmeraie	Modern	Var – La Croix-Valmer	1 Michelin star	1 Michelin star
La Passagere	Creative	Alpes-Maritimes – Juan-les-Pins	1 Michelin star	1 Michelin star
La Petite Maison de Cucuron	French	Vaucluse – Cucuron	1 Michelin star	1 Michelin star
La Table de l'Orangerie	Modern	Bouches-du-Rhône – Le Puy	1 Michelin star	1 Michelin star
La Table de Nans	Mediterranean	Bouches-du-Rhône – La Ciotat	1 Michelin star	1 Michelin star
La Table de Pierre	Mediterranean	Alpes-Maritimes – Saint-Paul-de-Vence	—	1 Michelin star
La Table de Pierre Reboul	Creative	Bouches-du-Rhône – Aix-en-Provence	1 Michelin star	1 Michelin star
La Table de Tourrel	Modern	Bouches-du-Rhône – Saint-Rémy-de-Provence	1 Michelin star	1 Michelin star
La Table de Xavier Mathieu	Mediterranean	Vaucluse – Joucas	1 Michelin star	1 Michelin star
La Table des Amis	Modern	Vaucluse – Bonnieux	2 Michelin stars	2 Michelin stars
La Table du Cap Estel	Modern	Alpes-Maritimes – Èze	—	1 Michelin star
La Table du Castellet	Creative	Var – Le Castellet	3 Michelin stars	3 Michelin stars
La Terrasse	Mediterranean	Var – Saint-Tropez	1 Michelin star	1 Michelin star
La Vague d'Or	Creative	Var – Saint-Tropez	3 Michelin stars	3 Michelin stars
La Villa Archange	Modern	Alpes-Maritimes – Le Cannet	2 Michelin stars	2 Michelin stars
La Villa Madie	Creative	Bouches-du-Rhône – Cassis	3 Michelin stars	3 Michelin stars
La Voile	Modern	Var – Ramatuelle	2 Michelin stars	2 Michelin stars
Le Art	Modern	Bouches-du-Rhône – Aix-en-Provence	1 Michelin star	1 Michelin star
Le Cap	Modern	Alpes-Maritimes – Saint-Jean-Cap-Ferrat	1 Michelin star	1 Michelin star
Le Chantecler	Modern	Alpes-Maritimes – Nice	1 Michelin star	1 Michelin star
Le Feuillée	Modern	Alpes-de-Haute-Provence – Mane	1 Michelin star	1 Michelin star
Le Figuier de Saint-Esprit	French	Alpes-Maritimes – Antibes	1 Michelin star	—
Le Goût du Bonheur	French	Vaucluse – Cadenet	1 Michelin star	1 Michelin star
Le Jardin de Berne	Modern	Var – Flayosc	1 Michelin star	1 Michelin star
Le Mas Bottero	Modern	Bouches-du-Rhône – Saint-Cannat	1 Michelin star	1 Michelin star
Le Petit Nice	Seafood	Bouches-du-Rhône – Marseille	3 Michelin stars	3 Michelin stars
Le Relais des Moines	Modern	Var – Les Arcs	1 Michelin star	1 Michelin star
Le Restaurant des Rois	Modern	Alpes-Maritimes – Beaulieu-sur-Mer	1 Michelin star	1 Michelin star
Le Vivier	Modern	Vaucluse – L'Isle-sur-la-Sorgue	1 Michelin star	1 Michelin star
Les Agitateurs	Creative	Alpes-Maritimes – Nice	1 Michelin star	1 Michelin star
Les Oliviers	Modern	Var – Bandol	—	1 Michelin star
Les Pecheurs	Mediterranean	Alpes-Maritimes – Antibes	1 Michelin star	1 Michelin star
Les Terraillers	Modern	Alpes-Maritimes – Biot	1 Michelin star	1 Michelin star
Louroc	Mediterranean	Alpes-Maritimes – Antibes	1 Michelin star	1 Michelin star
Maison Hache	French	Bouches-du-Rhône – Eygalières	1 Michelin star	Closed
Mareluna	Creative	Alpes-Maritimes – Théoule-sur-Mer	1 Michelin star	1 Michelin star
Mirazur	Creative	Alpes-Maritimes – Menton	3 Michelin stars	3 Michelin stars
ONICE	Modern	Alpes-Maritimes – Nice	1 Michelin star	1 Michelin star
Pollen	Modern	Vaucluse – Avignon	1 Michelin star	1 Michelin star
Pure & V	Modern	Alpes-Maritimes – Nice	1 Michelin star	Closed
Racines	Vegetarian	Alpes-Maritimes – Nice	1 Michelin star	1 Michelin star
Récif	French	Var – Saint-Raphaël	1 Michelin star	Closed
Restaurant Pierre Grein	French	Alpes-de-Haute-Provence – Manosque	1 Michelin star	1 Michelin star
Shanael	Modern	Var – Toulon	—	1 Michelin star
Une Table, au Sud	Modern	Bouches-du-Rhône – Marseille	1 Michelin star	1 Michelin star
Villa Salone	Modern	Bouches-du-Rhône – Salon-de-Provence	1 Michelin star	1 Michelin star
Reference				

== See also ==
- List of Michelin 3-star restaurants
- List of Michelin-starred restaurants in Monaco
- Lists of restaurants
