= Raymond I =

Raymond I may refer to:

- Raymond I, Count of Toulouse (died 865), also count of Albi, Limoges, Rouergue and Quercy
- Raymond I, Count of Pallars and Ribagorza (fl. 872–920)
- Raymond I, Count of Tripoli (r. 1102–1105), also count of Toulouse as Raymond IV
- Raymond I of Turenne (c. 1074 – c. 1137), viscount
- Raymond I Trencavel (died 1167), viscount of Agde, Béziers, Albi, Carcassonne and Razès
