= Geldemar Carpenel =

Geldemar Carpenel (Waldemar) (died 7 September 1101), of unknown parentage. Lord of Dargoire, Lord of Haifa (Calphas).

Geldemar took the cross during the First Crusade and joined the army of Raymond of Saint-Gilles. After the conquest of Jerusalem in which Geldemar's forces were aided by Raymond Pilet d'Alès, Raymond IV first sent him to Jaffa and then Godfrey of Bouillon entrusted him, as his friend, with the rule of Haifa. Haifa had been recently liberated by Tancred and, angered by Godfrey’s action, expelled Geldemar from the city after Godfrey’s death in 1100. Geldemar retired to St. Abraham’s Castle in Hebron.

Appealing to the new King of Jerusalem, Baldwin I, Geldemar was reinstated as Lord of Haifa, under the condition that it be restored to Tancred after 15 months. Geldemar was one of many barons who supported the appointment of Dagobert of Pisa as Latin Patriarch of Jerusalem, and yet upon Godfrey's death he seized the Tower of David along with the previous patriarch Arnulf of Chocques in order to ensure Baldwin I's succession and thereby denying Daimbert's vision of a theocracy in Jerusalem.

In September 1101, Geldemar was killed in the First Battle of Ramla against the Fatimid Caliphate, while fighting in the Crusader vanguard. With his death, Haifa formally fell back to Tancred, but no later than 1103, the lordship was given to Rohard I, allegedly a relative of Geldemar’s.

== Sources ==
A Database of Crusaders to the Holy Land, 1095-1149 (on-line)

Runciman, Steven, A History of the Crusades, Volume One: The First Crusade and the Foundation of the Kingdom of Jerusalem, Cambridge University Press, London, 1951

Barber, Malcolm, The Crusader States, Yale University Press, New Haven, 2012 (available on Google Books)
