= Delphine of Glandèves =

French Christian saint

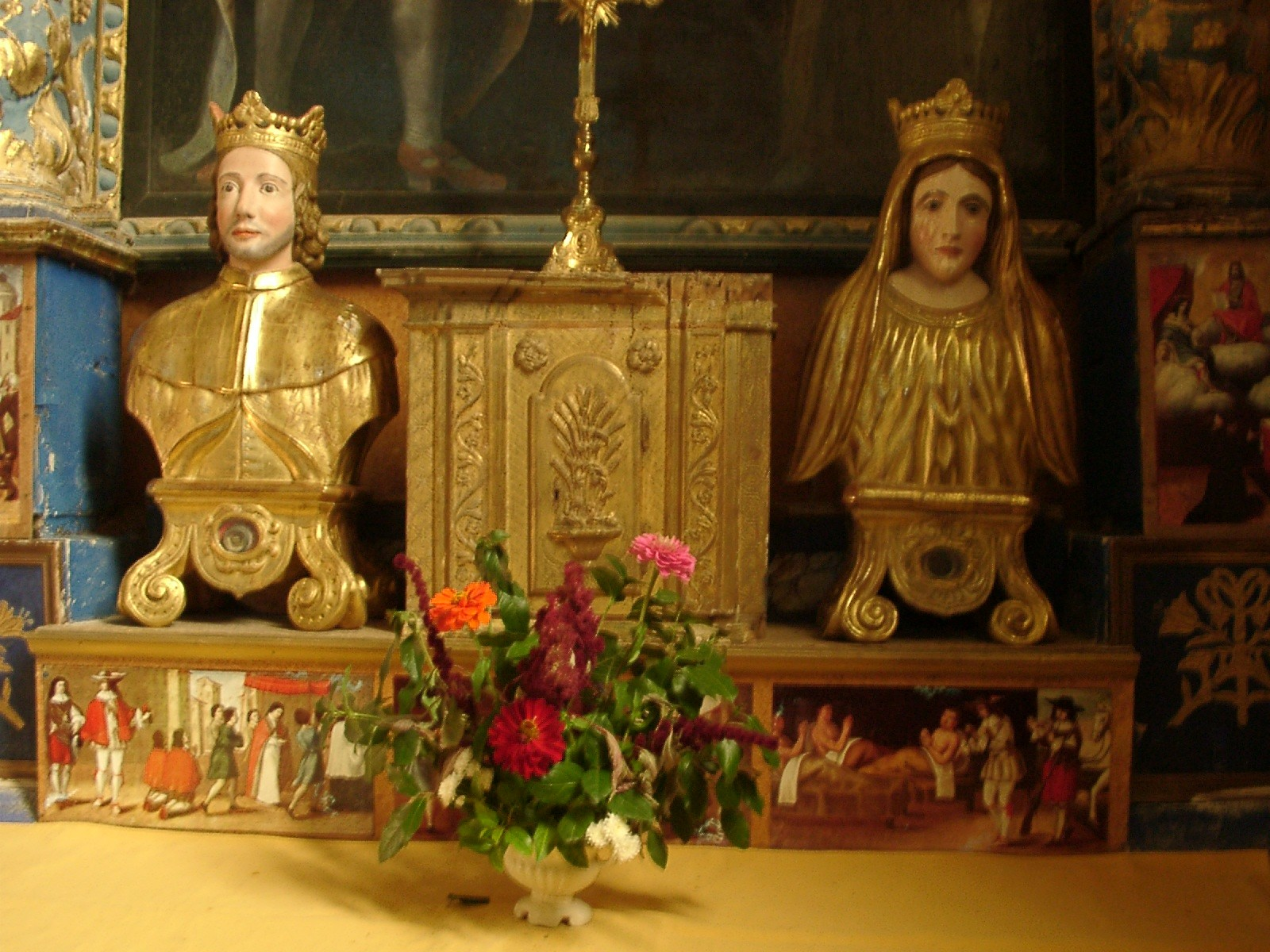
Reliquaries of St. Elzéar and Bl. Delphine in the Franciscan church of Ansouis, France

Delphine of Glandèves (or of Sabran) was born in 1284 in region of Provence, now part of France. She died on 26 November 1358, having lived as a Franciscan tertiary for most of her life.

Delphine was the daughter and heiress of the Count of Puy-Michel. Left an orphan in her infancy, she was placed under the guardianship of her uncles, and was brought up under the direction of her aunt, who was the abbess of the Convent of St. Catherine of Sorps, at Bauduen. As a young girl, she took a vow of virginity which she kept to the end of her life.

Despite her vow, at the age of twelve she was espoused to the ten-year-old Elzéar, Count of Sabran. They were married three years later at the castle of Puy-Michel. Having grown up together, they regarded each other as brother and sister, rather than husband and wife. Inspired by her example, her husband also took a vow of celibacy, which both honored throughout their married life.

Elzear took his place as a trusted aide at the court in Aix-en-Provence. The couple, having both received the habit of the Third Order of St. Francis, lived together at their castle in Ansouis in the practice of prayer, penance and charity towards the poor. After seven years, they moved to Puy-Michel. When Elzear had to go to Naples to see to some inherited property, they kept up a regular correspondence. Elzéar died in 1323.

After the death of her husband, Delphine sold all her possessions for the benefit of the poor and retired first to Naples and then to Cabrières, which was the location of the castle where her husband had born. She finally returned to Apt where her husband had been buried. Upon her death, she was buried with him in the church of the Friars Minor there, wearing the habit of the Order.

The veneration that had begun to be given to Delphine was confirmed by Pope Urban V, godson of Elzéar, who canonized her husband at that time. Her feast day is celebrated on 26 November, the anniversary of her death.
