= Army of Raymond of Saint-Gilles =

Provençal army from the First Crusade

The army of Raymond of Saint-Gilles was one of the first to be formed after Pope Urban II called for the First Crusade. Raymond formed a Provençal army and left his County of Toulouse in October 1096, traveling over the land route. He was the only leader of a major army that did not swear an oath of fealty to Byzantine emperor Alexius I Komnenos.

The known members of the army, which numbered in the thousands, were almost all French and included the ones listed below, as reported in histories of the First Crusade. Unless otherwise noted, references are to the on-line database of Riley-Smith, et al., and the hyperlinks therein provide details including original sources. The names below are also referenced in the Riley-Smith tome, Appendix I: Preliminary List of Crusaders. Those references are not shown unless they appear elsewhere in the text of previously referenced book. Articles that are hyperlinked to a more detailed article in this encyclopædia rely on the latter for references.

== The Commander’s Household ==
The known members of the Commanders’s household include the following:

- The Commander’s wife Elvira of Castile, daughter of Alfonso VI the Brave, King of León, and their son born and died on the journey. (See also Women in the Crusades.)
- The Standard-Bearer of the Commander was Heraclius I, Viscount of Polignac, related to Peter of Fay and was brother to Pons of Fay. He died in the siege of Antioch on 9 July 1098
- Raymond of Vigeois, chamberlain to the Commander.

== Clergy ==
The members of the church traveling with the Commander included:

- Adhemar of Le Puy, Bishop of Puy-en-Velay, recognized as spiritual leader of the Crusade. He was brother of the knight William Hugh of Montei.
- Aicard, Archbishop of Arles (Achard of Marseilles)
- Richard, Cardinal of St. Victor of Marseilles
- Bernard of Valence, priest and chaplain of Adhemar of Le Puy, Bishop of Artah, patriarch of Antioch
- Aufan, Bishop of Apt
- Bertrand of Bas, priest and canon of Le Puy
- Bertrand (II) of Provence-Alpes-Côte-d'Azur and Bouches-du-Rhône, lay sacristan of the church in Arles
- Herbert, Chaplain of Chaise-Dieu and of the Commander, Bishop of Tripoli
- Peter I, Bishop of Glandèves
- Peter I of Narbone, promoted to Bishop of Albara during the Crusade. Peter’s position was the precursor to the office of the Latin Patriarchate of Antioch.
- Peter Desiderius, priest and chaplain of Isoard I of Die
- Pons of Grillon, chaplain of Raymond Decan, Lord of Posquières
- Raymond, Lord of Posquières, dean of the Church of St. Trophime in Arles and a follower of Pons of Griffon
- Simon, chaplain to the Commander
- Stephen of Valence, priest
- William, Bishop of Orange.

== Historians ==
Two of the clergy recorded the activities of the army and included:

- Peter Tudebode, a priest and author of Historia de Hierosolymitano itinere, a chronicle of the Crusade
- Raymond of Aguilers, priest and chaplain to Raymond of Saint-Gilles. Chronicler of the Crusade in his Historia Francorum qui ceperunt Iherusalem.

== Nobles ==
The nobles and lords who fought with the Commander included:

- Achard, Castellan of Montmerle. He was killed in an ambush during the siege of Jerusalem.
- Arved Tudebode, a relative of Peter Tudebone, who was killed at the siege of Antioch
- Bernard Ato IV, Viscount of Béziers and Carcassonne
- Béranger, Viscount of Narbonne
- Centule II, Count of Bigorre, half-brother of Gaston IV of Béarn
- Gaston IV, Viscount of Béarn
- Geldemar Carpenel, Lord of Haifa
- Girard I, Count of Roussillon (possible)
- Gouffier I, Lord of Lastours, Hautefort and Tarrason, related to a number of later Crusaders, and apparently brought a tamed lion back from the East
- Hugh, Lord of Salagnac
- Peter, Viscount of Castillon, sent by the Commander to try and secure Antioch before the arrival of his army
- Peter, Lord of Fay-Chapteuil, brother of Pons of Fay-Chapteuil and related to the Standard-Bearer Heraclius I, Viscount of Polignac. He was killed by imperial troops while crossing Byzantine territory.
- Pons, Lord of Blazon
- Pons II, Lord of Fay-le-Froid, brother of Peter of Fay-Chapteuil and a relative of Heraclius of Polignac. He, like his brother, was killed by imperial troops while crossing Byzantine territory.
- Pons, Lord of Mezenc, brother or half-brother of Peter the Bastard
- Raimbold II, Count of Orange
- Raymond I, Viscount of Turenne, brother-in-law to Rotrou III of Perche
- Rigaud IV, Lord of Tournemire, accompanied by an almoner
- Roger, Lord of Mirepoix
- Roman of Le Puy, later Lord of Transjordan
- William Peyre, Lord of Cunhlat, master of Peter Bartholomew
- William III, Count of Forez and Lyon
- William I, Lord of Sabran
- William II Jordan, Count of Berga and Cerdagne (Cendenya)
- William V, Count of Montpellier.

== Knights and other Soldiers ==
While many thousands of knights and other fighting men joined the army, the following were noted:

- Arnold Tudebode and his brother Arvedus (Arfan) Tudebod, both killed at the siege of Antioch. They were brothers of Peter Tudebode the cleric and historian.
- Bernard Raymond of Béziers, likely the son of Bertrand II of Provence, the father-in-law of Bernard Ato IV
- Farald of Thouars
- Brothers Gerald, Raymond and Pons. Little is known about the brothers except that they each donated their part of the tithes pertaining to the castle of Rocha Martina to the abbey of St. Victor of Marseilles.
- Isoard of Ganges, who distinguished himself at the siege of Antioch
- Isoard I, Count of Die, a comrade of Peter Desiderius and under the command of Raymond Pilet d’d’alas
- Peter the Bastard, Lord of Mezenc, brother of First Crusaders Pons, Lord of Mezenc, and Guy and William (expedition unclear)
- Peter of Roaix
- Peter Bartholomew, was servant to William Peyre of Cunhla, and was sent as a messenger to the Turkish emir Kerbogha. His vision of the Holy Lance led to his trial by fire. He was pulled from the fire by Raymond Pilet d’Alès, but subsequently died.
- Pons the Red, died shortly after returning from the Crusade
- Pons Rainard (Raynouard), died during the Crusade
- Raymond of Curemonte
- Raymond Pilet d’Alès, a well known knight
- Raymond Bertrand of l’Isle-Jourdan
- William Hugh of Monteil I, occupier of the Crusader castle Krak des Chavaliers, brother of Adhemar of Le Puy.

== Major Battles ==
The army of Raymond took part in most of the major battles in the First Crusade, including:

- Siege of Nicaea, 1097
- Battle of Dorylaeum, 1097
- Siege of Antioch, 1097–1098
- Capture of Krak des Chavaliers, 1099
- Battle of Ascalon, 1099.

He and his army also participated in the doomed Crusade of 1101.

== Sources ==
- Riley-Smith, Jonathan, The First Crusaders, 1095-1131, Cambridge University Press, London, 1997
- Runciman, Steven, A History of the Crusades, Volume One: The First Crusade and the Foundation of the Kingdom of Jerusalem, Cambridge University Press, London, 1951
- Bury, J. B., Editor, The Cambridge Medieval History, Volume III: Germany and the Western Empire, Cambridge University Press, London, 1922
- Prof. J. S. C. Riley-Smith, Prof, Jonathan Phillips, Dr. Alan V. Murray, Dr. Guy Perry, Dr. Nicholas Morton, A Database of Crusaders to the Holy Land, 1095-1149 (available on-line)
- Tudebode, Peter, Historia de Hierosolymitano itinere, John and Laurita Hill, Editors, Paris, 1977
- Raymond d'Aguilers, Historia Francorum qui ceperunt Iherusalem, John and Laurita Hill, Editors, Paris, 1969
- France, John, Victory in the East: A Military History of the First Crusade, Cambridge University Press, 1996 ( available on Internet Archive)
