= Ménil =

- Commune
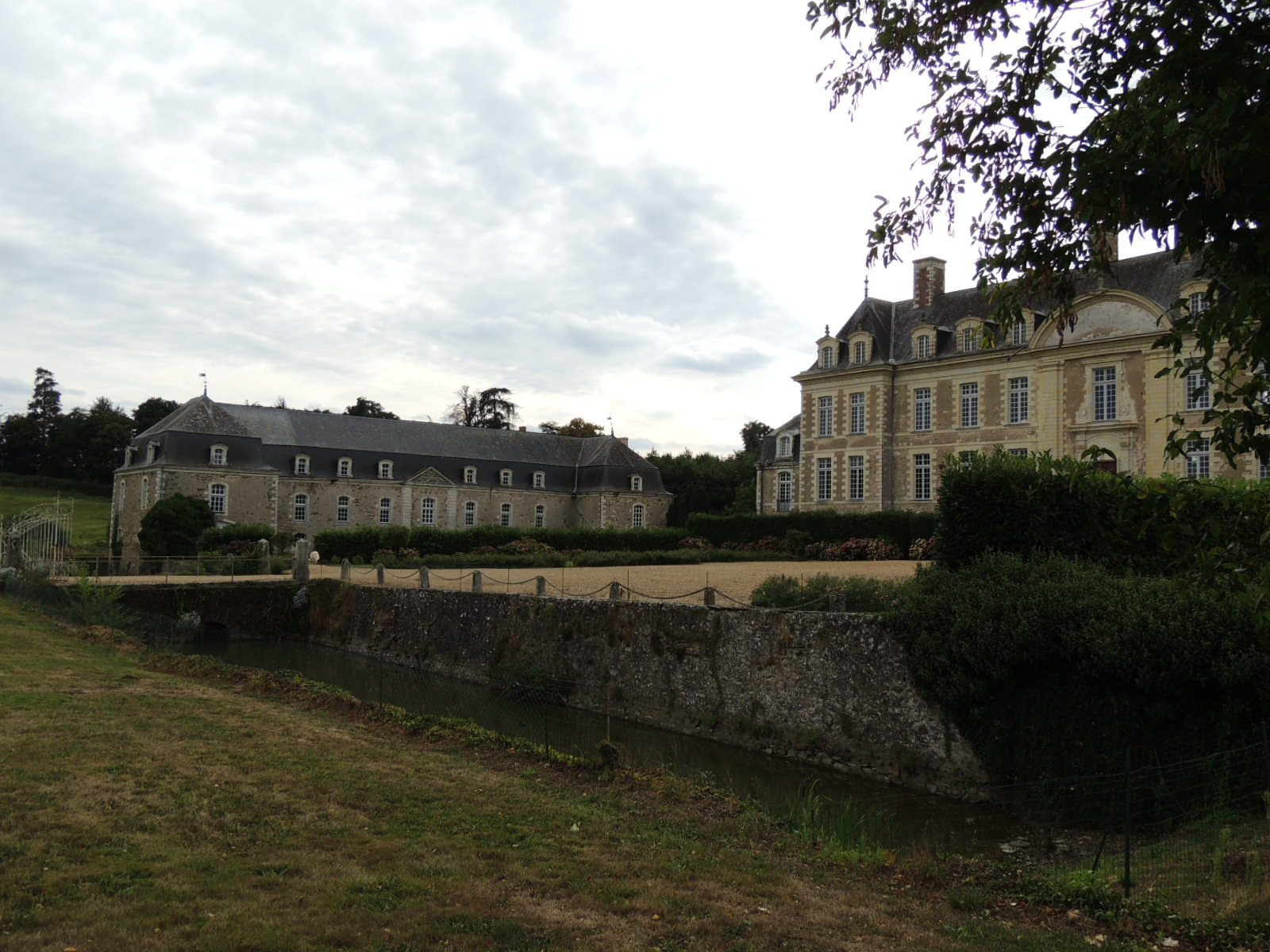
- The Chateau de Magnanne, in Ménil

- Coat of arms
- Location of Ménil
- Location within France Location within Pays de la Loire
- Coordinates: 47°46′34″N 0°40′30″W
- Country: France
- Region: Pays de la Loire
- Department: Mayenne
- Arrondissement: Château-Gontier
- Canton: Château-Gontier-sur-Mayenne-1

Government
  - Mayor (2020–2026): Patricia Bresteaux
- Area^{1}: 28.7 km^{2} (11.1 sq mi)
- Elevation: 28 m (92 ft)
- Highest elevation: 83 m (272 ft)
- Lowest elevation: 19 m (62 ft)
- Population (2023): 923
  - Density: 32.2/km^{2} (83.3/sq mi)
- Time zone: UTC+01:00 (CET)
  - Summer (DST): UTC+02:00 (CEST)
- INSEE/Postal code: 53150 /53200
- ^{1} French Land Register data, which excludes lakes, ponds, glaciers > 1 km^{2} (0.386 sq mi or 247 acres) and river estuaries.

Ménil (French pronunciation: [menil]) is a commune in the Mayenne department in north-western France. Its population in the census of 1999 was 785 inhabitants.

It is a member of the Community of Pays de Château-Gontier.

== See also ==
- Communes of Mayenne
- Menil Collection
