= Raymond Pilet d'Alès =

Occitan lord of Alés and knight during the First Crusade

Raymond Pilet (Raymond de Narbonnne-Pelet) (c. 1075 – 1120) was the only child of Bernard I Pilet of Narbonne and his wife, whose name is unknown. Seigneur of Alès. Bernard was the son of Raymond II, Viscount of Narbone from 1066 to 1067. The name “pilet” refers to a fur that the nobility wore over their cuirass and coats-of-arms. Raymond distinguished himself as a combatant during the First Crusade.

== Joining the First Crusade ==
Many of the chroniclers of the Crusades, including William of Tyre, have praised the valor and piety of Raymond. Guibert of Nogent’s Dei Gesta per Francos goes so far as to describe him as a mythological hero. Raymond’s exploits in the crusade are recorded in Historia Francorum qui ceperunt Iherusalem, the chronicle of Raymond of Aguilers. Raymond was first under the command of Hugh the Great, Count of Vermandois, as part of his army and was present at the siege of Nicaea in 1097.

At the first siege of Antioch, from 21 October 1097 to 2 June 1098, Raymond was in the army of Raymond IV of Toulouse. During the second siege, he commanded the 11th Corps of the Christian army, with Isoard I, Count of Die (Diois), Gérard de Roussillon, William V of Montpellier and Guillaume-Amanieu d'Albert.

Raymond also played a role in the saga of the Holy Lance. After the discovery of the lance and questions about its authenticity, Peter Bartholomew went through an ordeal of fire to verify it as a holy relic. Raymond pulled Peter from the fire, saving his life temporarily (he died of his wounds twelve days later), and the lance was discredited.

== Talamania and the Massacre at Ma’arra ==
Raymond constituted a small army of cavalry and infantry, and advance two days' march from Antioch, where they captured the castle of Talamania (Note: Talamania, possibly Al-Bara or Tell Mannas.) from the Syrians. He then implemented an ambitious raid on Ma'arrat al-Nu'man (Maarat), infamously known as the siege of Ma'arra, where he encountered a Muslim army under the command of Ridwan of Allepo, against whom he first prevailed despite the inequality of numbers of troops. But his adversaries returned at full strength, forcing him to retreat and defend himself until the evening of 27 July 1098. His army, overwhelmed by adversaries, loss of troops, thirst and weariness, decided to abandon the fight and regroup in the castle. Raymond and Peter I of Narbonne, Bishop of Albara, eventually abandoned their positions to travel with Raymond IV.

The victory at Ma’arra is tainted by the alleged cannibalism of the Crusaders, being low on food, and allegedly turned on both the vanquished Muslims as well as dogs. It is not clear that Raymond was still in the city when this happened.

== Tortosa ==
On 14 February 1099 Raymond and Raymond I of Turenne deployed with 100 horsemen and 200 footmen, to take the town of Tortosa (also known as Tartus or Antartus) defended by the formidable castle at Marqab. They besieged it and despite their numerical inferiority, gained the advantage by lighting many fires in the surrounding countryside. The defenders of the castle, including the governor of Torosa (a subject of the Emir of Tripoli) were frightened and fled before dawn, abandoning the city to the Crusaders on 18 June 1099. Raymond then followed Count Raymond IV in his expedition to Tripoli in the unsuccessful siege of Arqa.

== Siege of Jerusalem ==
Raymond led a mounted the siege of Jerusalem on 14 July 1099, contributing to the capture and rescue of the Holy City. In early July 1099, nine Genovese ships arrived at the port of Jaffa to resupply the Crusaders. Then Raymond IV dispatched Raymond, Guillaume de Sabran, and Raymond I of Turenne, with 50 horsemen to protect them. The latter, having advanced, found Geldemar Carpenel, Lord of Caiphas, struggling with an army of 700 Muslims from Rama who attacked him, inflicting great losses on his infantry. Raymond’s forces allowed the Genoese to disembark, enabling them to take Jerusalem.

== Marriage and Children ==
Raymond married Agnes, of an unknown family. Raymond and Agnes had two children:

- Raymond (d. 1148)
- Bernard II, (d. 1172), Seigneur of Alès, also Count of Melgueil, jure uxoris (as Bernard V of Pilet).

Raymond returned from the Crusades and died sometime after 11 July 1120. His son Bernard continued as the Seigneur of Alès.

== Sources ==
- Edgington, Susan, Albert of Aachen: Historia Ierosolimitana, History of the Journey to Jerusalem, Clarendon Press, Gloucestershire, 2007 (available on Google Books)
- Runciman, Steven, A History of the Crusades, Volume One: The First Crusade and the Foundation of the Kingdom of Jerusalem, Cambridge University Press, London, 1951, numerous references (see index)
- Peters, Edward, The First Crusade: The Chronicle of Fulcher of Chartres and Other Source Materials, University of Pennsylvania Press, Philadelphia, 1998
- William of Tyre, A History of Deeds Done Beyond the Sea, translated by E.A. Babcock and A.C. Krey. Columbia University Press, New York, 1943
- Riley-Smith, Jonathan, The First Crusaders, 1095-1131, Cambridge University Press, London, 1997
