= Raymond I of Turenne =

Viscount of Turenne

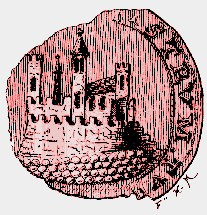
Seal (device) Turenne

Raymond I of Turenne (c. 1074 – c. 1137) was the 7th Viscount of Turenne. He participated along with his vassals in the First Crusade as part of the Army of Raymond of Saint-Gilles.

== Family ==
Raymond was born around 1074, in the viscounty of Turenne, in Limousin. He succeeded his father, Boson of Turenne, who died during a pilgrimage to Jerusalem in 1091, and thus he became the 7th viscount of Turenne. His mother Gerberge, daughter of Bernard of Terrasson-Lavilledieu, became a nun at the Abbey of Saint-Martin de Tulle in 1103 and died in the same year.

== First Crusade ==
In 1095, Raymond joined the crusaders led by Raymond de Saint-Gilles, Count of Toulouse. Before his departure, he entrusted the viscounty of Turenne to his mother. However, he prevailed in arms in many sieges, especially in Antioch and Jerusalem. During the Battle of Antioch that followed the siege, Raymond de Saint-Gilles decided to defend the fort of Mahomerie, the most attacked by Kerbogha's army, to put an end to the accusations of “laziness and avarice”. He chose his best captains to defend him: Pierre of Castillon, Raymond of Turenne, William V of Montpellier, William I of Sabran and Gouffier of Lastours, in addition to 500 most valiant men of their troops. The siege was finally lifted by the Muslims on June 28, 1098.

Raymond de Saint-Gilles then marched south. Part of the troops arrived on February 12, 1099, in front of Arqa. The Count of Toulouse sent various detachments to fetch supplies in the country, and Raymond of Turenne, accompanied by Pierre, Viscount of Castillon, and more than 14 other knights. That troop having started on February 16, 1099, met another of 60 Turks or Arabs who took away some Christian prisoners and 500 heads of cattle. Despite the inequality in numbers, the Christians attacked the Muslims, killed six of them, took as many horses, and took the booty they were bringing to Tripoli and prisoners were released.

Later on, Raymond Pilet d'Alès and the viscount of Turenne, having been detached with 100 cavalry and 200 foot soldiers, advanced as far as the town of Tartus and besieged it. The inhabitants defend themselves with great valour. The knights resorted to a ruse to deceive the besieged on their numerical inferiority. They lighted, in the evening, innumerable fires in the surrounding countryside, letting the locals to believe that their army was powerful. The terrified defenders of the Citadel of Tartus fled before dawn, abandoning the city. The viscount found a lot of food there which was used to supply the army.

In July 1099, nine Genoese vessels arrive at the port of Jaffa to support the crusaders. Hence, the Count of Toulouse wanted to protect them, in which he sent Raymond Pilet d'Alès, William I of Sabran, and Raymond of Turenne at the head of 50 horsemen. The detachment of Turenne allowed the Genoese to land in the port with the relief equipment that allowed the Crusaders to take Jerusalem.

Leaving the siege of Jerusalem, Raymond Pilet d'Alès and Raymond of Turenne and several others, eager to fight, detached themselves from the army. They met two hundred Arabs, and these knights managed to kill many of them and seized thirty horses.

After the capture of Jerusalem, Raymond of Turenne was entrusted with guarding a fort near Antioch, along with other knights. Later on, he repelled an unexpected attack of 7,000 Muslims who threatened the camp of the Crusaders.

== Later years ==
He returned from the Holy Land seven years later in 1103, then he paid donations to abbeys and monasteries in Limousin, and founded a leprosarium in Nazareth. However, he had some internal conflicts in the region, in which he burned an earlier castle on the site of Château de Clérans around 1100.

He died after 1135, perhaps in 1137, and was buried in the tomb of the viscounts of Turenne, in front of the main door of the abbey of Saint-Martin de Tulle.

== Marriage and descendants ==
Raymond married Mathilde, daughter of Geoffrey II, Count of Perche. They had:

- Boson II of Turenne (1122–1143), 8th viscount of Turenne, married in 1142 Eustorgie d'Anduze;
- Magne, married Aymeri III of Gourdon
- Marguerite who first married Aimar IV of Limoges, and had Aimar V of Limoges (1135–1188). In her second marriage, she married Eble III of Ventadorn, from whom she separated around 1151. In her third marriage, she married Count William VI, Count of Angoulême, with whom she had four children, including: William VII of Angoulême and Aymer, Count of Angoulême.

== Sources ==
- de Vic, Claude; Vaissète, Joseph; Du Mège, Alexandre (1841). Histoire générale de Languedoc (in French). Vol. 3.
- Kostick, Conor (2008). The Social Structure of the First Crusade. Brill. ISBN 978-90-04-16665-3.
- Marvaux, François (1842). Histoire politique, cioile et réligieuse du Bas-Limousin, depuis les tempo anciens (in French).
- Nadaud, Joseph (1816). Chronologie de la première croisade (in French). Vol. 1. JB La Combe.
- Thompson, Kathleen (2013). Power and Border Lordship in Medieval France: The County of the Perche, 1000-1226. The Boydell Press.
