= Elzéar of Sabran =

Christian saint

Saint Elzéar of Sabran
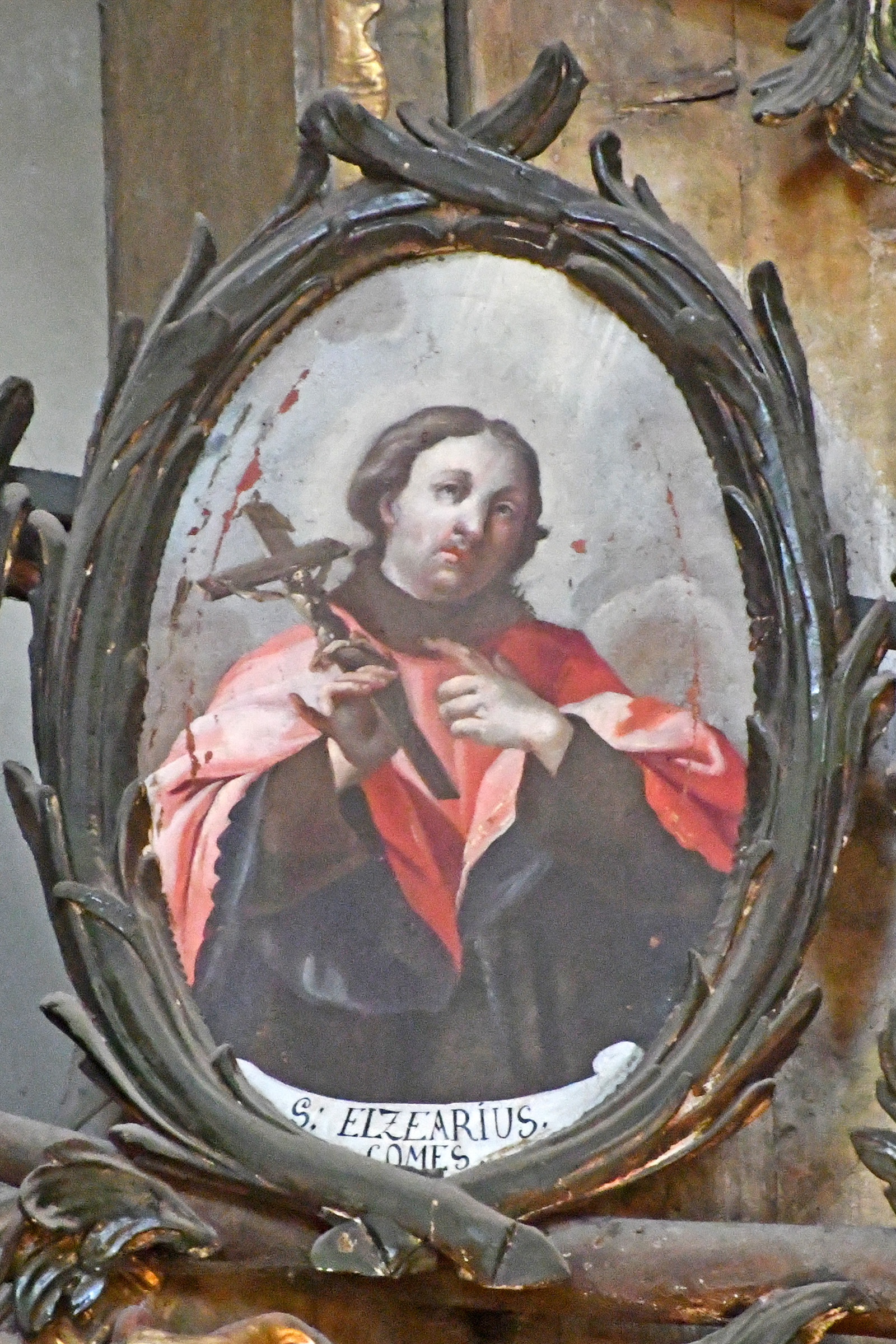
- A depiction of St. Elzéar, the Count, in the church of the Holy Cross, Vác (Pest County, Hungary)
- Born: 1285; Provence, France
- Died: 27 September 1323; Paris, France
- Venerated in: Roman Catholic Church
- Canonized: 15 April 1369 by Pope Urban V
- Feast: 27 September
- Attributes: crown, royal attire

Elzéar of Sabran, TOSF, Baron of Ansouis, Count of Ariano, was born in the castle of Saint-Jean-de-Robians, near Cabrières-d'Aigues in Provence, southern France, in 1285. He died in Paris, France, on September 27, 1323. He was a tertiary of the Franciscan Order as well as a ruler, diplomat and military leader. He is recognised as a saint in the Catholic Church.

== Biography ==
In his youth, Elzéar was given a thorough training in the Christian faith as well as in the sciences under the supervision of his uncle, William of Sabran, at the Abbey of St. Victor in Marseille, where his uncle ruled as the Abbot.

Acceding to the wish of King Charles II of Naples, at the age of ten, Elzéar was betrothed to the twelve-year-old Delphine of Glandèves, daughter and heiress of the Count of Puy-Michel. Three years later they were married at the castle of Puy-Michel. Upon their wedding night, Delphine advised her new husband that she had taken a private vow of chastity. Having grown up together, they regarded each other as brother and sister, rather than husband and wife. Even though he had the right in canon law to make her abandon this commitment, Elzéar chose to respect her desire to live in virginity and even copied her example in making the same vow. Together they joined the Third Order of Saint Francis.

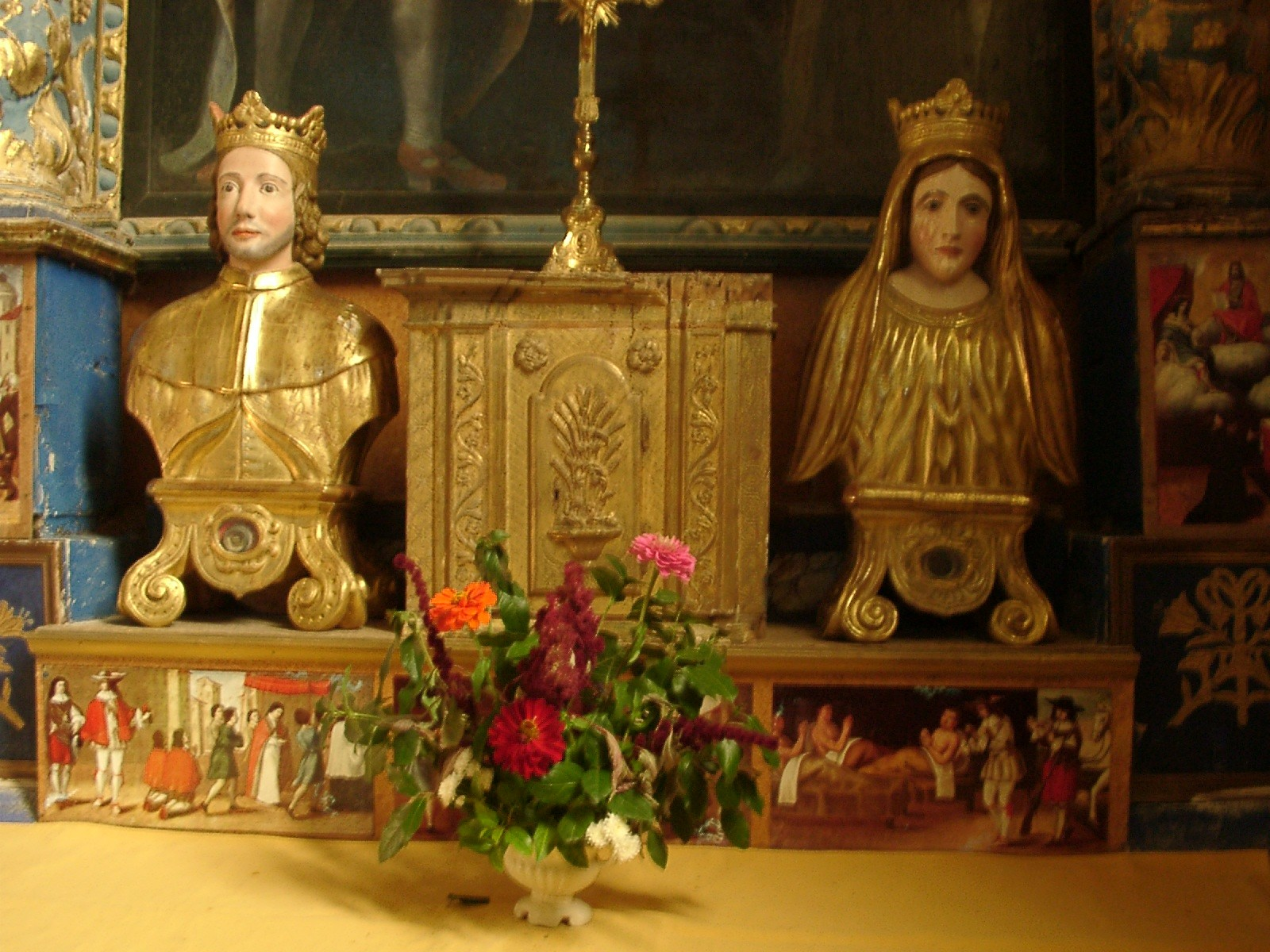
Reliquaries of St. Elzéar and Bl. Delphine in the Franciscan church of Ansouis, France

Elzéar and Delphine lived at a castle in Ansouis where they vied with one another in the practice of prayer, mortification of the flesh and in charity towards the unfortunate. At the age of twenty he moved with his wife from Ansouis to Puimichel for greater solitude, and formulated for his servants rules of conduct that made his household a model of Christian virtue.

Upon the death of his father in 1309, became Count of Ariano in Italy. There he gained by kindness the trust and support of his subjects, who had despised their Norman conquerors. In 1312 he marched to Rome at the head of the army of King Robert of Naples, which was mobilized to aid in expelling the Emperor Henry VII from that city. Returning to Provence after the war, he again set up a household in which piety and faithful practice of the Catholic faith were expected of all the members of his house.

In 1317 Elzéar went to Naples to become the tutor of Duke Charles, son of King Robert, and later became Charles' castellan, when Charles became Vicar General of the Kingdom of Sicily. He was sent as ambassador to the King of France in 1323 to obtain the hand of Marie of Valois in marriage for Charles, edifying a worldly court by his heroic virtues. While serving in that post he died, shortly after accomplishing his mission.

His body was returned to his domain, and he was buried in the Franciscan habit in the church of the Friars Minor at Apt, Vaucluse. The tomb was destroyed during the French Revolution.

The decree of his canonization was signed by his godson, Pope Urban V, and was carried out by his successor, Pope Gregory XI about 1371. Countess Delphine was also beatified by Pope Urban at that time. Their liturgical feast day, which they share, is celebrated by the Franciscan Third Order on 26 September.
