= Sabran =

- Commune
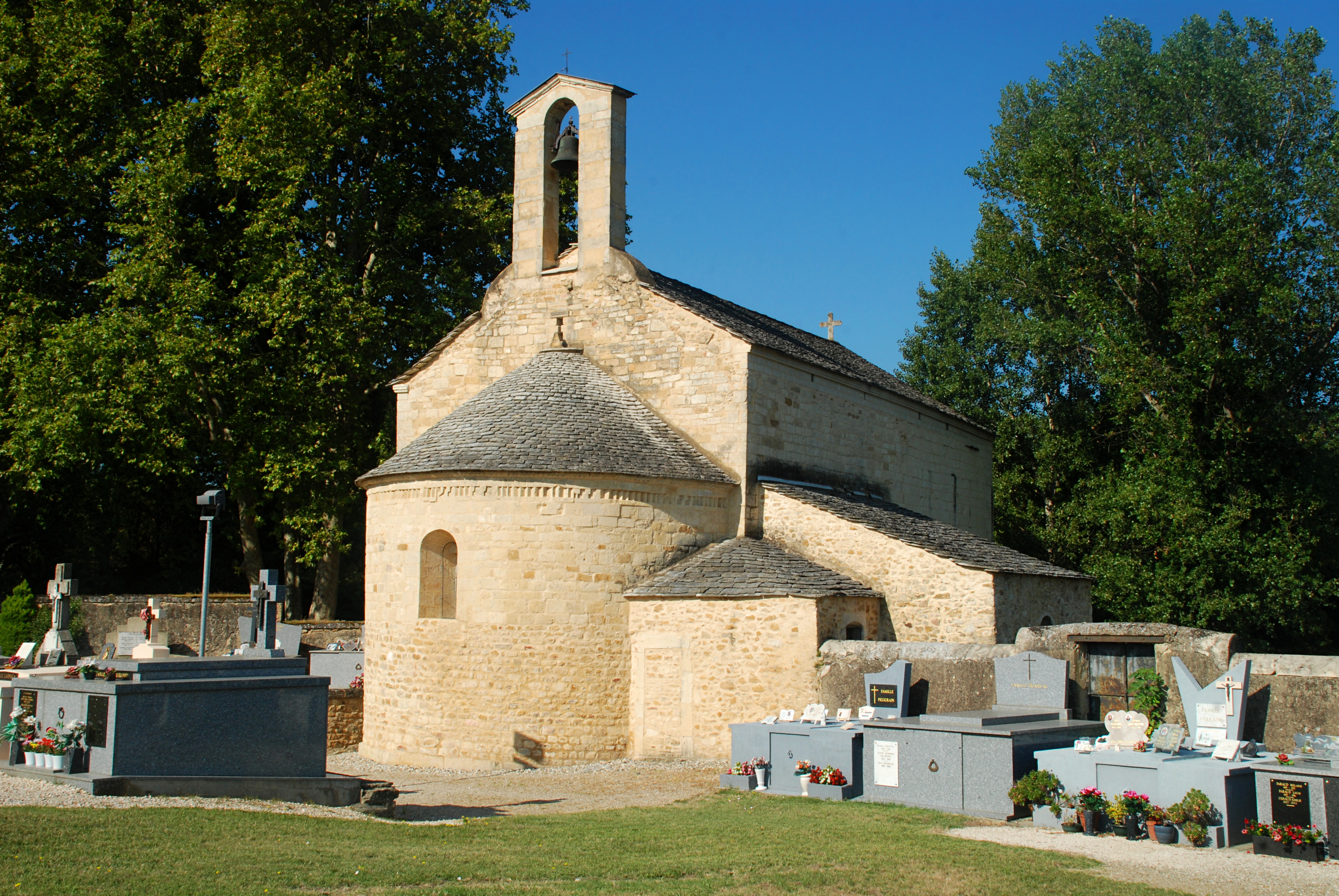
- The Chapel of Saint-Julien-de-Pistrin

- Coat of arms
- Location of Sabran
- Location within France Location within Occitanie
- Coordinates: 44°09′07″N 4°32′55″E
- Country: France
- Region: Occitania
- Department: Gard
- Arrondissement: Nîmes
- Canton: Bagnols-sur-Cèze
- Intercommunality: CA Gard Rhodanien

Government
  - Mayor (2020–2026): Sylvie Nicolle
- Area^{1}: 35.64 km^{2} (13.76 sq mi)
- Elevation: 284 m (932 ft)
- Highest elevation: 285 m (935 ft)
- Lowest elevation: 39 m (128 ft)
- Population (2023): 1,591
  - Density: 44.64/km^{2} (115.6/sq mi)
- Time zone: UTC+01:00 (CET)
  - Summer (DST): UTC+02:00 (CEST)
- INSEE/Postal code: 30225 /30200
- ^{1} French Land Register data, which excludes lakes, ponds, glaciers > 1 km^{2} (0.386 sq mi or 247 acres) and river estuaries.

Sabran (French pronunciation: [sabʁɑ̃]; Occitan: [saˈβɾa]) is a commune in the Gard department in southern France.

== Geography ==
=== Climate ===
Sabran has a hot-summer Mediterranean climate (Köppen climate classification Csa). The average annual temperature in Sabran is 13.9 °C (57.0 °F). The average annual rainfall is 785.0 mm (30.91 in) with October as the wettest month. The temperatures are highest on average in July, at around 23.3 °C (73.9 °F), and lowest in January, at around 5.8 °C (42.4 °F). The highest temperature ever recorded in Sabran was 40.7 °C (105.3 °F) on 11 August 2003; the coldest temperature ever recorded was −7.8 °C (18.0 °F) on 14 December 2001.

Climate data for Sabran (1981−2010 normals, extremes 1988−2008)
Month	Jan	Feb	Mar	Apr	May	Jun	Jul	Aug	Sep	Oct	Nov	Dec	Year
Record high °C (°F)	18.5 (65.3)	21.1 (70.0)	26.2 (79.2)	29.4 (84.9)	32.0 (89.6)	35.7 (96.3)	37.3 (99.1)	40.7 (105.3)	33.2 (91.8)	27.9 (82.2)	19.3 (66.7)	18.2 (64.8)	40.7 (105.3)
Mean daily maximum °C (°F)	8.7 (47.7)	10.4 (50.7)	14.2 (57.6)	16.8 (62.2)	21.7 (71.1)	25.7 (78.3)	28.8 (83.8)	28.5 (83.3)	23.0 (73.4)	17.8 (64.0)	11.7 (53.1)	8.4 (47.1)	18.0 (64.4)
Daily mean °C (°F)	5.8 (42.4)	6.7 (44.1)	9.9 (49.8)	12.3 (54.1)	16.8 (62.2)	20.5 (68.9)	23.3 (73.9)	23.1 (73.6)	18.5 (65.3)	14.3 (57.7)	8.8 (47.8)	5.8 (42.4)	13.9 (57.0)
Mean daily minimum °C (°F)	2.9 (37.2)	3.0 (37.4)	5.6 (42.1)	7.7 (45.9)	12.0 (53.6)	15.3 (59.5)	17.8 (64.0)	17.7 (63.9)	13.9 (57.0)	10.9 (51.6)	5.9 (42.6)	3.2 (37.8)	9.7 (49.5)
Record low °C (°F)	−6.8 (19.8)	−5.6 (21.9)	−6.6 (20.1)	0.3 (32.5)	3.4 (38.1)	8.0 (46.4)	9.3 (48.7)	10.6 (51.1)	4.6 (40.3)	1.1 (34.0)	−4.5 (23.9)	−7.8 (18.0)	−7.8 (18.0)
Average precipitation mm (inches)	66.8 (2.63)	34.9 (1.37)	37.1 (1.46)	71.6 (2.82)	68.3 (2.69)	43.6 (1.72)	33.0 (1.30)	47.4 (1.87)	118.3 (4.66)	125.1 (4.93)	87.3 (3.44)	51.6 (2.03)	785.0 (30.91)
Average precipitation days (≥ 1.0 mm)	6.0	4.0	4.1	7.5	6.9	4.9	3.3	4.3	5.6	8.0	7.2	5.8	67.6
Source: Météo-France

== Population ==
Historical population
Year	Pop.	±% p.a.
1968	1,006	—
1975	1,108	+1.39%
1982	1,243	+1.66%
1990	1,437	+1.83%
1999	1,683	+1.77%
2007	1,724	+0.30%
2012	1,807	+0.94%
2017	1,674	−1.52%
2023	1,591	−0.84%
Source: INSEE

== See also ==
- Communes of the Gard department
