= Ansouis =

Ansouis Ansoís (Occitan)
- Commune
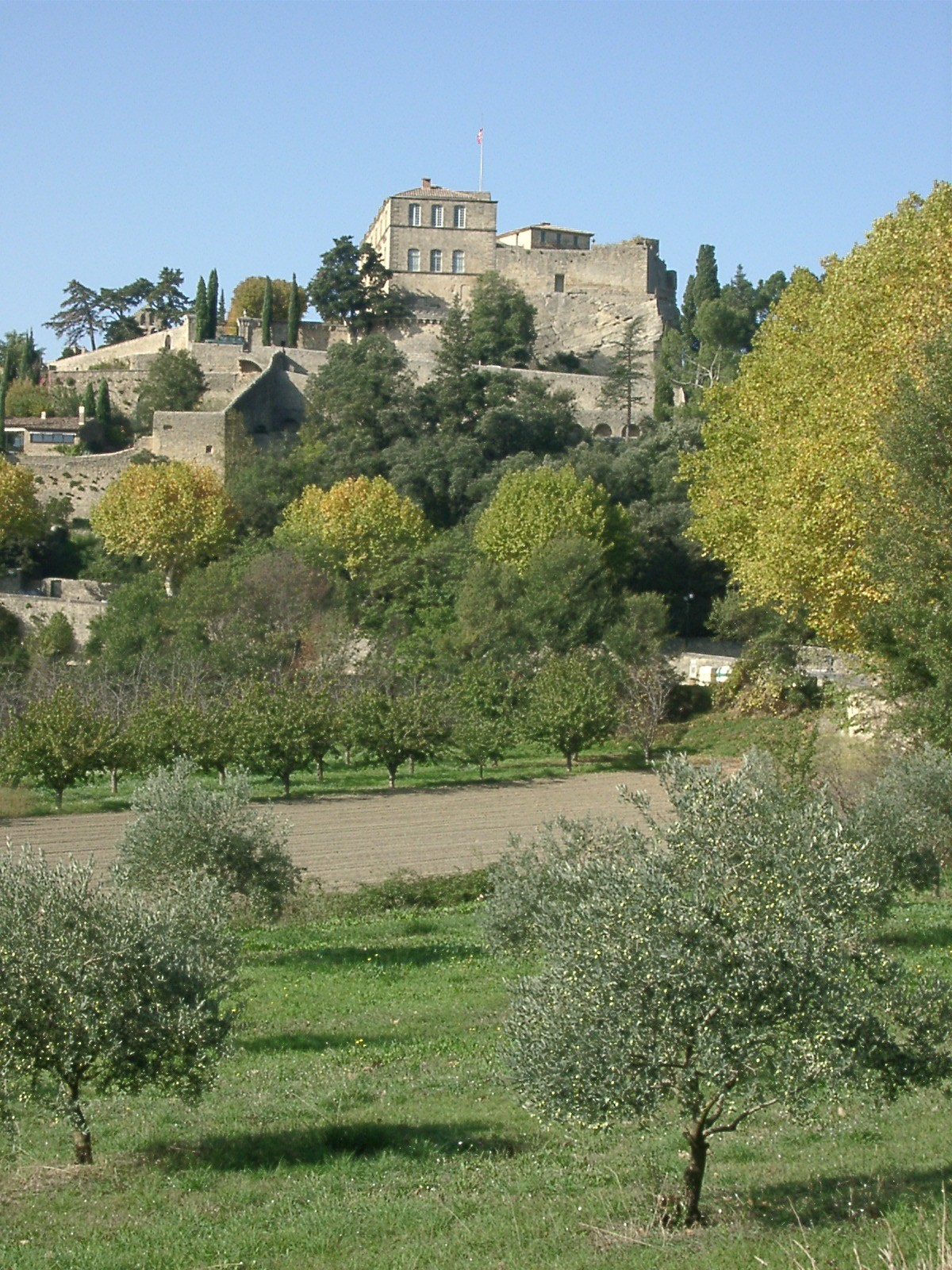
- View of Ansouis

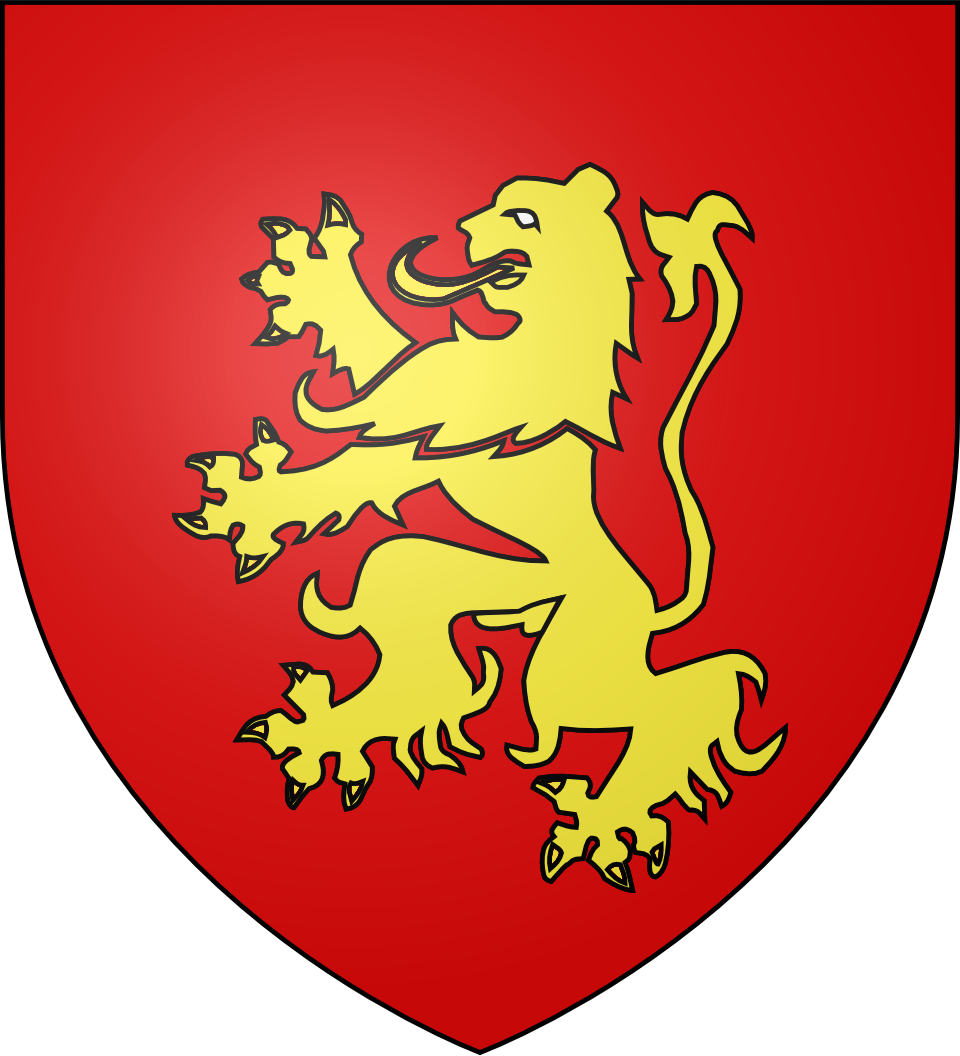
- Coat of arms
- Location of Ansouis
- Location within France Location within Provence-Alpes-Côte d'Azur
- Coordinates: 43°44′18″N 5°27′50″E
- Country: France
- Region: Provence-Alpes-Côte d'Azur
- Department: Vaucluse
- Arrondissement: Apt
- Canton: Pertuis

Government
  - Mayor (2020–2026): Géraud de Sabran-Pontevès
- Area^{1}: 17.63 km^{2} (6.81 sq mi)
- Highest elevation: 390 m (1,280 ft)
- Lowest elevation: 203 m (666 ft)
- Population (2023): 1,064
  - Density: 60.35/km^{2} (156.3/sq mi)
- Time zone: UTC+01:00 (CET)
  - Summer (DST): UTC+02:00 (CEST)
- INSEE/Postal code: 84002 /84240
- ^{1} French Land Register data, which excludes lakes, ponds, glaciers > 1 km^{2} (0.386 sq mi or 247 acres) and river estuaries.

Ansouis (French pronunciation: [ɑ̃swi(s)]; Occitan: Ansoís) is a commune in the Vaucluse department in the Provence-Alpes-Côte d'Azur region in southeastern France.

Its economy depends primarily on tourism and agriculture (mostly viticulture). Château d'Ansouis is a hilltop castle above the town.

== Geography ==
Ansouis is located between the Luberon massif and the Durance river.

== History ==
A fortress was first built in the city in the 10th century, and has since been modified three times: once in the 13th century and again in the 15th and 19th centuries.

Ansouis is a member of Les Plus Beaux Villages de France (The Most Beautiful Villages of France) Association.

== Demographics ==
The population, after peaking at 1,029 people in 1841, declined to only 463 people in 1931. It has since rebounded to 1,105 in 2006.

== See also ==
- Elzéar and Delphine of Sabran
- Côtes du Luberon AOC
- Communes of the Vaucluse department
