= List of Provençal royal consorts =

Queens, countesses, and duchesses consort of the Kingdom, County, Duchy of Provence include:

== Queen of Provence ==
See: List of Frankish queens and List of Burgundian queens.

After the division of the Carolingian Empire by the Treaty of Verdun (843), the first of the fraternal rulers of the three kingdoms to die was Lothair I, who divided his middle kingdom in accordance with the custom of the Franks between his three sons. Out of this division came the Kingdom of Provence, given to Lothair's youngest son, Charles. A heritage of royal rule was thus inaugurated in Provence that, though it was often subsumed into one of its larger neighbouring kingdoms, it was just as often proclaiming its own sovereigns.

=== Carolingian Dynasty, 855–879 ===
Picture	Name	Father	Birth	Marriage	Became Queen	Ceased to be Queen	Death	Spouse
	Engelberga	Adelchis I, Count of Parma	830	5 October 851	24 January 863 husband's accession	12 August 875 husband's death	896-901	Louis II of Italy
	Richilde of Provence	Bivin of Gorze	845	870	12 August 875 husband's ascession	6 October 877 husband's death	2 June 910	Charles the Bald
	Adelaide of Paris	Adalard, Count of Paris	850/853	February 875	6 October 877 husband's accession	10 April 879 husband's death	10 November 901	Louis the Stammerer

=== Bosonid Dynasty, 879–933 ===
Picture	Name	Father	Birth	Marriage	Became Queen	Ceased to be Queen	Death	Spouse
	Ermengard of Italy	Louis II (Carolingian)	835/852/855	June 876	10 April 879 husband's accession	11 January 887 husband's death	22 June 896	Boso I
	Anna of Constantinople	Leo VI the Wise (Macedonian)	888	around 900		912		Louis IV
	Adelaide	Rudolph I (Elder Welf)	-	902-914		28 June 928 husband's death	943	Louis IV
	Alda (or Hilda)	-	-	after 924	5 June 928 husband's accession	before 932 marriage annulled	-	Hugh I
	Marozia of Tusculum, Senatrix and Patricia of Rome	Theophylact I, Count of Tusculum (Tusculani)	890	932		December 932; 933; Provence ceases to be a separate kingdom.	932/937	Hugh I

In 933, Provence ceases to be a separate kingdom as Hugh exchanged it with Rudolph II of Upper Burgundy for the Iron Crown of Lombardy, that is, rule of Italy.

=== Welf Dynasty, 888–1032 ===
Picture	Name	Father	Birth	Marriage	Became Queen	Ceased to be Queen	Death	Spouse
	Bertha of Swabia	Burchard II, Duke of Swabia (Hunfridings)	907	922	933 husband's accession	11 July 937 husband's death	after 2 January 966	Rudolph I
	Adelane	-	935/40	950s?		23 March 963/4		Conrad III
	Matilda of France	Louis IV of France (Carolingian)	943	964		26/27 January 981/2		Conrad III
	Aldiud	-	-	after 981/2		19 October 993 husband's death	-	Conrad III
	Agaltrudis	-	-	before 12 January 994		21 March 1008 or 18 February 1011		Rudolph II
	Ermengarde of Savoy	Humbert I, Count of Savoy (Savoy)	-	24 April/28 July 1011		6 September 1032 husband's death	25/27 August 1057	Rudolph II

In 1032 the kingdom of Burgundy and Provence was incorporated into the Holy Roman Empire as a third kingdom, the Kingdom of Burgundy (later also known as Kingdom of Arles), with the King of Germany or Emperor as King of Burgundy.

== Countess of Provence ==
=== House of Provence, 961–1127 ===
Picture	Name	Father	Birth	Marriage	Became Countess	Ceased to be Countess	Death	Spouse
	Arsinde	probably Arnold of Comminges	-	before April 970		after 17 April 979		William I
	Adelaide of Anjou	Fulk II, Count of Anjou (Angevins)	947	984/6		993, after 29 August husband's death	29 May 1026	William I
	Gerberga	Otto-William, Count of Burgundy (Ivrea)	985	1002		1019 husband's death	1020/3	William II
	Eldiarde Eveza	-	-	before 23 April 1040		27 April 1051 husband's death	-	Fulk Bertrand
	Stephanie or Douce	probably William II, Viscount of Marseille or not	-	before 27 January 1040		February 1061-63 husband's death	after 1 April 1080	Geoffrey I
	Theresa of Aragon	Ramiro I of Aragon (Jiménez)	1037	-	27 April 1051 husband's accession	-		William Bertrand
	Adelaide of Cavenez	-	-	-		28 July 1094 husband's death	after 1110	William Bertrand
	Ermengarde	-	-	13 July 1065		13 February 1065/7 husband's death	after April 1077	Geoffrey II
	Matilda	-	-	before February 1061	1063 husband's accession	29 April 1090 or 28 July 1094 husband's death	-	Bertrand II

=== House of Barcelona, 1127–1267 ===
Picture	Name	Father	Birth	Marriage	Became Countess	Ceased to be Countess	Death	Spouse
	Beatrice, Countess of Melgueil	Bernard IV, Count of Melgueil	1124	1135		March 1144 husband's death	after 1190	Berenguer Ramon
	Richeza of Poland	Władysław II the Exile (Piast)	1130/40	17 November 1161		1166 husband's death	16 June 1185	Ramon Berenguer II
	Ermesinda de Rocaberti	Jofré I, Viscount of Rocaberti (Rocaberti)	-	before 1184		before 1185		Sancho
	Garsenda, Countess of Forcalquier	Renier de Sabran, Lord of Caylar and Ansouis	1180	July 1193		1 December 1209 husband's death	1242	Alfonso II
	Beatrice of Savoy	Thomas I, Count of Savoy (Savoy)	1205	December 1220		19 August 1245 husband's death	4 January 1267	Ramon Berenguer IV

=== Capetian House of Anjou, 1267–1382 ===
Picture	Name	Father	Birth	Marriage	Became Countess	Ceased to be Countess	Death	Spouse
	Maria of Hungary	Stephen V of Hungary (Árpád)	1257	May/June 1270		5 May 1309 husband's death	25 March 1323	Charles II
	Sancha of Majorca	James II of Majorca (Barcelona)	1285	20 September 1304	5 May 1309 husband's ascession	20 January 1343 husband's death	28 July 1345	Robert

=== House of Valois-Anjou, 1382–1481 ===
Picture	Name	Father	Birth	Marriage	Became Countess	Ceased to be Countess	Death	Spouse
	Marie of Blois-Châtillon	Charles of Blois-Châtillon, Duke of Brittany (Châtillon)	1343/5	9 July 1360	12 May 1382 husband's accession	20 September 1384 husband's death	12 November 1404	Louis I
	Yolande of Aragon	John I of Aragon (Barcelona)	11 August 1384	2 December 1400		29 April 1417 husband's death	14 November 1442	Louis II
	Margaret of Savoy	Amadeus VIII, Duke of Savoy (Savoy)	1410s or 7 August 1420	1424/31 August 1432		12 November 1434 husband's death	30 September 1479	Louis III
	Isabella, Duchess of Lorraine	Charles II, Duke of Lorraine (Lorraine)	c. 1400	24 October 1420	12 November 1434 husband's accession	28 February 1453		René
	Jeanne de Laval	Guy XIV, Count of Laval (Laval)	10 November 1433	10 September 1454		10 July 1480 husband's death	19 December 1498	René
	Jeanne de Lorraine	Frederick II of Vaudémont (Lorraine)	1458	21 January 1474	10 July 1480 husband's accession	25 January 1480		Charles III

=== Courtesy title ===
Picture	Name	Father	Birth	Marriage	Became Countess	Ceased to be Countess	Death	Spouse
	Marie Joséphine of Savoy	Victor Amadeus III of Savoy (Savoy)	2 September 1753	16 April 1771		8 June 1795 became titular Queen of France, called: Madame de Provence	13 November 1810	Louis Stanislas Xavier de France, became: Louis XVIII of France

== Margravine of Provence ==
See: List of Toulousain consorts.

== See also ==
- List of rulers of Provence
