= List of rulers of Provence =

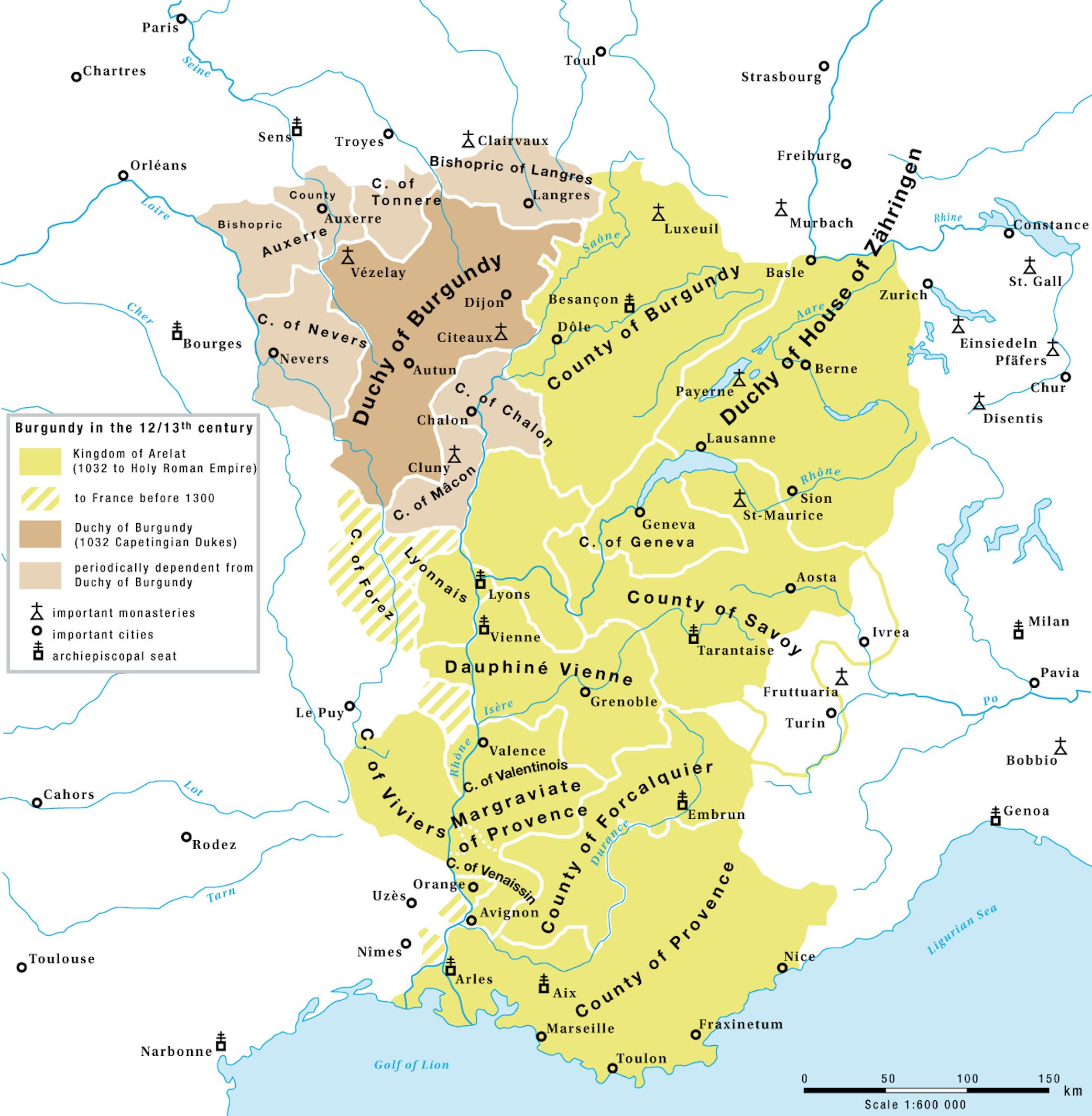
Map showing the march and county Provence and the county of Forcalquier as parts of the Kingdom of Burgundy-Arles in the 12th and 13th centuries

The land of Provence has a history quite separate from that of any of the larger nations of Europe. Its independent existence has its origins in the frontier nature of the dukedom in Merovingian Gaul. In this position, influenced and affected by several different cultures on different sides, the Provençals maintained a unity which was reinforced when the region was made a separate kingdom during the Carolingian decline of the later ninth century. When Boso of Provence acquired the region in 879, it was known as Lower Burgundy until it was merged with Upper Burgundy in 933 to form the Kingdom of Arles. The counts of Arles began calling themselves "count of Provence"; although in name vassals, they were de facto autonomous princes. After 1032, the county was part of the Holy Roman Empire.

In the eleventh century, Provence became disputed between the traditional line and the counts of Toulouse, who claimed the title of "Margrave of Provence". In the High Middle Ages, the title of Count of Provence belonged to local families of Frankish origin, from 1112 to 1245 to the House of Barcelona (a cadet branch of the House of Aragón), from 1245 to 1382 to the House of Anjou, and from 1382 to 1481 to a cadet branch of the House of Valois. It was inherited by King Louis XI of France in 1481, and definitively incorporated into the French royal domain by his son Charles VIII in 1487.

== Merovingian dukes ==
During the period of the Merovingian dynasty in Gaul, Provence was a province ruled by duces (dukes), military leaders and district commanders who served as defenders of the frontiers of the kingdom and ruled over vast territories as opposed to the comites (counts), who ruled the cities and their environs. Provence was usually a part of the division of the Frankish realm known as the Kingdom of Burgundy, which was treated as its own kingdom. Their title sometimes appears as rector Provinciae.

This is an incomplete list of the known Merovingian-appointed dukes of Provence.

- Liberius (until 534), Ostrogothic appointee
- Namatius (bef. 552), Frankish appointee
- Bodegisel (fl. c. 566)
- Adovarius (561–569)
- Lupus (569–570)
- Jovin (570–573)
- Albin (573–575)
- Dinamius (from 575)
- Gondulf (fl. c. 581)
- Leudegisel (fl. c. 585), of Burgundian Provence
- Nicetas (from 587)
- Babo (fl. c. 600)
- Aegyla (fl. c. 602)
- Bado (634–641)
- Willibad (641–643), of Burgundian Provence
- Hector (fl. c. 679)
- Nemfidius (fl. c. 700)
- Antenor (fl. c. 697)
- Metrannus (fl. c. 700)
- Maurontus (c. 720 – 739)
- Abbo (fl. c. 739)

== Carolingian dukes ==
Provence was ruled by a poorly known series of dukes during the period of general Carolingian unity until the Treaty of Verdun (843).

- Leibulf (until c. 829)
- Guerin (c. 829 – 845)
- Fulcrad (845 – c. 860)

== Carolingian kings ==
After the division of the Carolingian Empire by the Treaty of Verdun (843), the first of the fraternal rulers of the three kingdoms to die was Lothair I, who divided his middle kingdom in accordance with the custom of the Franks among his three sons. Out of this division came the Kingdom of Provence, given to Lothair's youngest son, Charles. A heritage of royal rule was thus inaugurated in Provence which, though it was often subsumed into one of its larger neighbouring kingdoms, was just as often proclaiming its own sovereigns.

The kingdom of Provence was also known as Lower Burgundy (or Cisjurane Burgundy). Its capital was first Vienne then Arles.

- Charles of Provence (855–863)
  On his death, Provence was divided between his surviving brothers, Lothair II and the Emperor Louis II. The bulk went to Louis.
- Louis II (863–875), also Holy Roman Emperor from 855
  On his death, as with his Kingdom of Italy, Louis's Provence went to his uncle Charles the Bald .
- Charles the Bald (875–877), also Holy Roman Emperor from 875
- Louis the Stammerer (877–879)
  With the death of Louis the Stammerer, Provence refused to elect his two sons and instead elected one of their own as king. Boso married Ermengard, daughter of Louis II, to strengthen his and his son's claim.
- Boso (879–887)
- Louis the Blind (887–928), also Holy Roman Emperor from 901 to 905
  Louis's kingdom did not pass to his heirs, but instead to his brother-in-law, the husband of his sister, Hugh, who had acted as his regent since 905. Hugh never used the royal title in Provence.
- Hugh (911–933)
  In 933, Provence ceased to be a separate kingdom as Hugh exchanged it with Rudolph II of Upper Burgundy for the Iron Crown of Lombardy, that is, rule of Italy.

== Counts and margraves, within the Empire ==
In the aftermath of the death of Louis the Blind, Provence began to be ruled by local counts placed under the authority of a margrave. Firstly, Hugh of Arles served as duke and regent during Louis' long blindness. Secondly, Hugh gave the march of Vienne and duchy of Provence to Rudolf II of Burgundy in a treaty of 933. Rudolf was never recognised by the nobles of the country and appointed Hugh, Duke of Burgundy, as its first margrave.

At the time, the premier counts in the region were the counts of Arles and those of Avignon. Those who would first bear the title comes Provinciae or "count of Provence" descended from one Rotbold of Arles. William I and Rotbold I did not divide their father's domains and this indivisibility was maintained by their respective descendants. It is thus impossible to ascertain who succeeded whom in the county as various reigns overlap.

By his marriage to Emma of Provence, daughter of Rotbold II, William III, Count of Toulouse inherited lands and castles in Provence. Emma inherited the title Margrave of Provence upon her elder brother's death in 1037. Her son Pons by William III did not survive her, but her grandson did and claimed her title in opposition to the younger line of counts of Provence.

=== Bosonid dynasty ===
Name	Born	Reign	Consort	Death	Notes
William I the Liberator	c.950 Son of Boson II of Arles and Constance of Vienne	961–975	Arsenda of Comminges no children Adelaide-Blanche of Anjou c.984 four children	After 29 August 993	First counts of Provence and brothers, ruled together until 975, when William took the margravial title. and Rotbold took the same title in 993, after William abdication.
William I the Liberator	c.950 Son of Boson II of Arles and Constance of Vienne	975–993	Arsenda of Comminges no children Adelaide-Blanche of Anjou c.984 four children	After 29 August 993	First counts of Provence and brothers, ruled together until 975, when William took the margravial title. and Rotbold took the same title in 993, after William abdication.
Rotbold I	Son of Boson II of Arles and Constance of Vienne	961–993	Emilde two children	1008	First counts of Provence and brothers, ruled together until 975, when William took the margravial title. and Rotbold took the same title in 993, after William abdication.
Rotbold I	Son of Boson II of Arles and Constance of Vienne	993–1008	Emilde two children	1008	First counts of Provence and brothers, ruled together until 975, when William took the margravial title. and Rotbold took the same title in 993, after William abdication.
Regency of Adelaide-Blanche of Anjou:993–999
William II the Pious	c.980 Son of William I and Adelaide-Blanche of Anjou	999–1019	Gerberga of Burgundy c.984 four children	4 March 1019	Fell under control of his uncle Rotbold until his death in 1008.
Rotbold II	c.980 Son of Rotbold I and Emilde	1008–1014	Ermengarde of Burgundy before 1002 three children	1014	
William III	Son of Rotbold II and Ermengarde of Burgundy	1014–1037	Lucie before 1002 three children	1037	
William IV	c.980 Son of William II and Gerberga of Burgundy	1019–1030	Unmarried	1030	
Fulk Bertrand	c.1000 Son of William II and Gerberga of Burgundy	1030–1051	Hildegard two children	27 April 1051	Brothers, ruled jointly after their elder brother's death.
Geoffrey I	c.1000 Son of William II and Gerberga of Burgundy	1030–1062	Etienette four children	February 1062	Brothers, ruled jointly after their elder brother's death.
After William III's death with no descendants, the line of counts became the sovereign line in Provence, but not uncontested. In fact, through Emma, who inherited her brother William III's margravial title, her descendants, the counts of Toulouse, claimed Provence for themselves as margraves, in spite of never having ruled there.: 1062–1094 William IV of Toulouse; 1094–1105 Raymond IV of Toulouse; 1105–1112 Bertrand of Toulouse; 1119–1125 Alfonso Jordan of Toulouse
William Bertrand I	c.1040 Son of Fulk Bertrand and Hildegard	1062–1094	Theresa of Aragon no children Adelaide of Cavenez one child	28 July 1094	Co-ruled as brothers and cousins.
Geoffrey II	c.1040 Son of Fulk Bertrand and Hildegard	1062–1067	Ermengard no children	13 February 1067	Co-ruled as brothers and cousins.
William Bertrand II	c.1050 Son of Geoffrey I and Etienette	1063–1093	Matilda one child	1093	Co-ruled as brothers and cousins.
Gerberga	1045/65; Daughter of Geoffrey I and Etienette	1094–1112	Gilbert I of Gévaudan; 1073 two children	1115	Considered a wise ruler. She abdicated in 1112 to her eldest daughter, soon after her marriage to the count of Barcelona.

=== House of Gévaudan ===
Name	Born	Reign	Consort	Death	Notes
Douce I	c.1090 Daughter of Gilbert I of Gévaudan and Gerberga	1112–1127	Ramon Berenguer III of Barcelona; 3 February 1112; Arles five children	1127	Ruled together with her husband, the Catalan Ramon Berenguer III of Barcelona.

=== Houses of Barcelona (comital) and Toulouse (margravial) ===
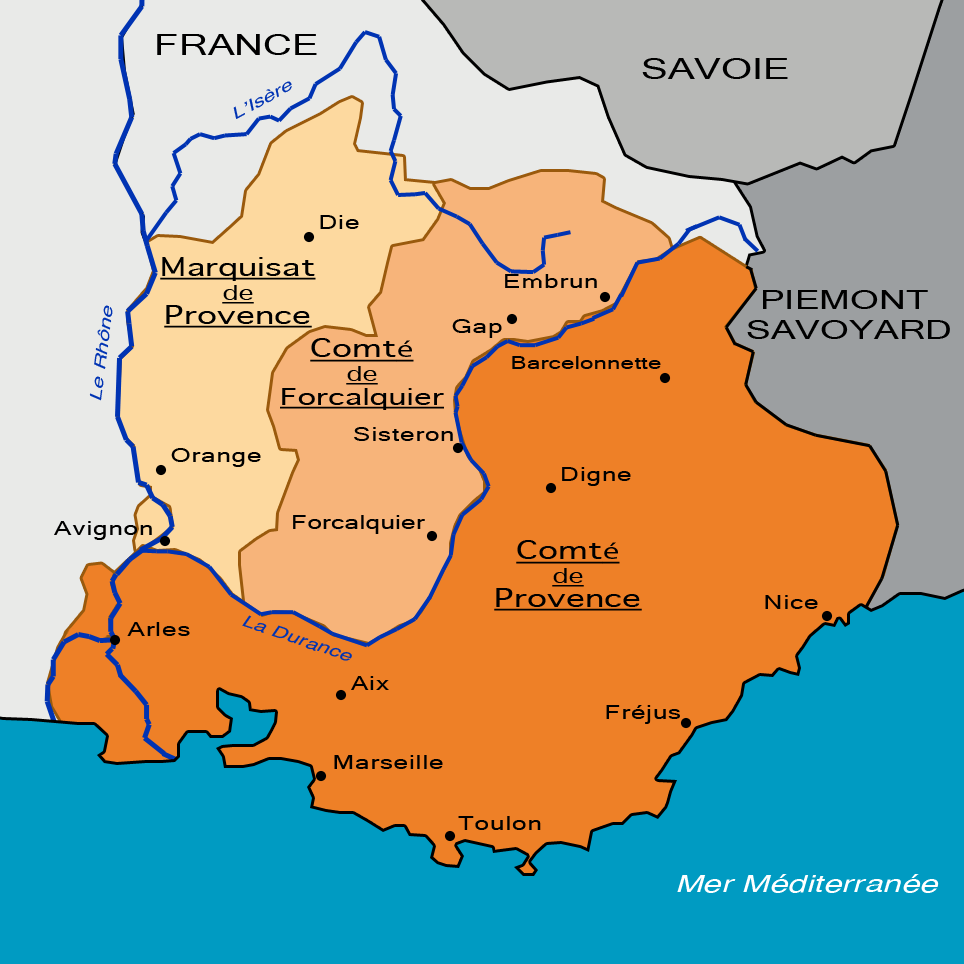
Division of Provence obtained by Alfonso Jordan in 1125.

With a lack of interest in the Reconquista on their southern frontier, the Catalans turned towards their origins, the Mediterranean littoral and northwards. They coveted the region between the Cévennes and the Rhône, then under the control of Toulouse. In 1112, the count of Barcelona, Ramon Berenguer III, married the heiress of Provence, Douce, who was the daughter of the Countess Gerberga of Provence, Gévaudan, Carladais, and part of Rodez. The marriage was probably taken at the urging of the church, which was then in conflict with the House of Toulouse. In 1076, Count Raymond IV was excommunicated, but he still lent his support to Aicard, the deposed archbishop of Arles (since 1080). With the count away on the First Crusade, the church took the opportunity to seize the balance of power in the region. This marriage effectively put Provence under Catalan control.

To accommodate the longstanding claims of the count of Toulouse, in 1125, Raymond's heir, Alfonso Jordan, signed a treaty whereby his family's traditional claim to the title of "Margrave of Provence" was recognised and the march of Provence was defined as the region north of the lower Durance and on the right of the Rhône, including the castles of Beaucaire, Vallabrègues, and Argence. The region between the Durance, the Rhône, the Alps, and the sea was that of the county and belonged to the house of Barcelona. Avignon, Pont de Sorgues, Caumont and Le Thor remained undivided.

Internally, Provence was racked by uncertainties over rights of succession. Douce and Ramon Berenguer signed all charters jointly until her death in 1127, after which he alone appears as count in all charters until his death in 1131. At that time, Douce's younger sister, Stephanie was married to Raymond of Baux, who promptly laid claim to the inheritance of her mother, even though Provence had peacefully passed into the hands of her nephew, Berenguer Ramon I.

Ruler		Born	Reign	Death	Ruling part	Consort	Notes
Ramon Berenguer I the Great; El Gran		11 November 1082; Rodez; Son of Ramon Berenguer II and Mafalda of Apulia-Calabria	1112 –19 July 1131	19 July 1131; Barcelona aged 48	County of Provence	María Rodríguez de Vivarbr/>1103 two children Almodis de Mortain; 1106 no children Douce I, Countess of Provence; 3 February 1112; Arles seven children	His last marriage with the heiress of Provence brought it under Barcelona domain. His reign saw a proliferation of Provençal culture in Catalonia.
Alfonso Jordan		1103; Tripoli; Son of Count Raymond IV of Toulouse and Elvira of Castile	1125 - 16 August 1148	16 August 1148; Caesarea aged 44–45	Margraviate of Provence	Faydite d'Uzès c.1125 four children	Also Count of Toulouse. Obtained half of Provence by the division agreement of 1125.
William III		c.1080 Son of Ermengol IV, Count of Urgell and Adelaide, Countess of Forcalquier	1129 –7 October 1129	7 October 1129; Avignon aged 48–49	County of Forcalquier	Gersende of Albon c.1080 two children	Came from the Urgell branch of the House of Barcelona. Inherited the neighbouring County of Forcalquier.
Guigues		c.1090? First son of William III of Forcalquier and Gersende of Albon	7 October 1129 –1149	1149 aged 58–59	County of Forcalquier	Unknown one child	His child probably predeceased him, as he was succeeded by his brother.
Regency of Ramon Berenguer IV, Count of Barcelona (1144–1157)							In August 1161, he travelled to Turin with his uncle to obtain confirmation of his countship in Provence from the Emperor Frederick I, for Provence was legally a fief of the Holy Roman Empire.
Ramon Berenguer II		c.1135 Son of Berenguer Ramon I and Beatrice of Melgueil	March 1144 – March 1166	March 1166; Nice aged 30–31	County of Provence	Richeza of Poland; 17 November 1161 one child	In August 1161, he travelled to Turin with his uncle to obtain confirmation of his countship in Provence from the Emperor Frederick I, for Provence was legally a fief of the Holy Roman Empire.
Raymond I		1134; Tripoli; Son of Alfonso Jordan and Faydite d'Uzès	16 August 1148 - December 1194	December 1194; Nîmes aged 59–60	Margraviate of Provence	Constance of France c.1154 (annulled 1166) five children	Also Count of Toulouse as Raymond V.
Bertrand I		1104; Second son of William III of Forcalquier and Gersende of Albon	1149 –1151	1151 aged 46–47	County of Forcalquier	Josserande de la Flotte; 1130 three children	
Bertrand II		c.1130? First son of Bertrand I and Josserande de la Flotte	1151 –13 May 1207	13 May 1207 aged 76–77	County of Forcalquier	Cecilia of Béziers two children	Left no male heirs, and was succeeded by his brother.
Regency of Richeza of Poland (1166-1167)							She ruled a few months, as her half brother-in-law, Alfonso II of Aragon, claimed Provence for himself on the basis of the imperial enfeoffment of 1162.
Douce II		c.1162 Daughter of Ramon Berenguer II and Richeza of Poland	March 1166 – 1167	1172; Nice aged 9–10	County of Provence	Unmarried	She ruled a few months, as her half brother-in-law, Alfonso II of Aragon, claimed Provence for himself on the basis of the imperial enfeoffment of 1162.
Alphonse I the Troubadour; El Trobador	Alfons I	1-25 March 1157; Huesca; Son of Ramon Berenguer IV and Petronilla	1167 – 1173	25 April 1196; Perpignan aged 44	County of Provence	marriage agreement with Mafalda of Portugal 1159-1162, not fulfilled Sancha of Castile; 18 January 1174; Zaragoza seven children	Formal union of the Kingdom of Aragon and Barcelona. Alfonso also reunited various feudal dependencies. In August 1161, he travelled to Turin with his uncle obtain the confirmation of his countship in Provence from the Emperor Frederick I, for Provence was legally a fief of the Holy Roman Empire. In 1173, he gave the county to his younger brother Ramon Berenguer. However, he kept the title until his death in 1196.
Peter; Ramon Berenguer III		c.1158 Son of Count Ramon Berenguer IV of Barcelona and Petronilla of Aragon	1173–5 April 1181	5 April 1181; Montpellier aged 22–23	County of Provence	Unmarried	Abdicated of Cerdanya to his brother Sancho. In 1173, assuming the county of Provence, changed his name to Ramon Berenguer. In 1176, he joined Sancho in conquering Nice from Genoa. He was assassinated.
Sancho		c.1161 Son of Count Ramon Berenguer IV of Barcelona and Petronilla of Aragon	5 April 1181 – 1185	1223; Montpellier aged 61–62	County of Provence	Ermesinde of Rocabertí; 1184 one child Sancha Núñez de Lara; 1185 one child	Received from his brother the counties of Cerdanya and Roussillon, and in 1181, received also the County of Roussillon, in the sequence of the same brother's death. In 1184, Sancho signed a treaty of alliance with the count of Forcalquier, the count of Toulouse and the Republic of Genoa agreeing to oppose the king of Aragon's efforts to dominate Genoa and to take the city of Marseille from him. Abdicated from Provence in 1185, but ruled in Cerdanya-Roussillon until his death.
Alphonse II		1180; Barcelona; Son of Alfonso I and Sancha of Castile	1185 –2 February 1209	2 February 1209; Palermo aged 28–29	County of Provence	Garsenda, Countess of Forcalquier; July 1193; Aix-en-Provence one child	His reign was marked by his conflicts with the count of Forcalquier, to whose granddaughter he was married.
Raymond II		27 October 1156; Saint-Gilles, Gard; Son of Raymond I and Constance of France	December 1194 - 1 August 1222	1 August 1222; Toulouse aged 65	Margraviate of Provence	Ermessende of Pelet; 1172 no children Beatrice of Béziers after 1176 (annulled 1189) one child Joan of England; October 1196; Rouen two children A daughter of Isaac Komnenos of Cyprus c.1200 (annulled 1202) no children Eleanor of Aragon; January 1204; Perpignan no children	Also Count of Toulouse as Raymond VI. Allied with the Cathars, like many of the neighbouring Languedoc states, his domains in Toulouse were challenged by the Albigensian Crusade between 1215 and 1218.
William IV		c.1130 Second son of Bertrand I and Josserande de la Flotte	13 May 1207 –7 October 1209	7 October 1209 aged 78–79	County of Forcalquier	Adelaide of Béziers one child	Left a daughter, Garsenda, who predeceased him; he was succeeded by his granddaughter, also named Garsenda.
Garsenda		c.1180 Daughter of Rainou of Sabran and Garsenda of Forcalquier	7 October 1209 –1222	1242 aged 60–61	County of Forcalquier (House of Sabran)	Alfonso II, Count of Provence; July 1193; Aix-en-Provence one child	In 1222, she abdicated for her son, and Forcalquier was absorbed by Provence.
Forcalquier annexed to Provence
Regency of Garsenda, Countess of Forcalquier (1209–1220)							Supporter of the Provençal lyric and culture and the Albigensian Crusade. He also helped his father-in-law in his conflict with Turin and Guigues VI of Viennois. His surviving four daughters all married kings, causing a dispute about his succession.
Ramon Berenguer IV		1198; Son of Alfonso II and Garsenda, Countess of Forcalquier	February 1209 –19 August 1245	19 August 1245; Aix-en-Provence aged 46–47	County of Provence	Beatrice of Savoy; 5 June 1219; Aix-en-Provence six children	Supporter of the Provençal lyric and culture and the Albigensian Crusade. He also helped his father-in-law in his conflict with Turin and Guigues VI of Viennois. His surviving four daughters all married kings, causing a dispute about his succession.
Raymond VII		July 1197; Beaucaire, Gard; Son of Raymond II and Joan of England	1 August 1222 - 27 September 1249	27 September 1249; Toulouse aged 52	Margraviate of Provence	Sancha of Aragon; March 1211 (annulled 1241) one child Margaret of Lusignan; 1243 (annulled 1245) no children	Also Count of Toulouse as Raymond VII. Took Carcassonne with Count Roger-Bernard III of Foix, in the Albigensian Crusade.
Beatrice		1229; Daughter of Ramon Berenguer IV and Beatrice of Savoy	19 August 1245 –23 September 1267	23 September 1267; Nocera Inferiore aged 37–38	County of Provence	Charles I, King of Sicily; 31 January 1246; Aix-en-Provence seven children	Her inheritance caused tense relations with her sisters; Her husband installed his French court in Provence and, after her death, inherited the county.
Joanna		c.1220 Toulouse; Daughter of Raymond VII and Sancha of Aragon	27 September 1249 - 25 August 1271	25 August 1271; Siena aged 50–51	Margraviate of Provence	Alphonse of France c.1237 Toulouse no children	The war between Louis VIII of France and Languedoc region ended with the Treaty of Meaux (1229), determining the wedding of Joan, the heiress of Toulouse, with Alphonse, prince of France. The lack of descendance of the couple determined the annexation of the County of Toulouse, the Duchy of Narbonne, and the Margraviate of Provence to the Crown of France after their deaths.

=== Capetian Angevin dynasty ===
- 1246–1285 Charles I, Count of Anjou, Maine, Provence and Forcalquier (1246), King of Naples, Sicily (1266) and Jerusalem (1277).
- 1285–1309 Charles II of Naples the Lame, King of Naples and (nominal) Jerusalem and Sicily, son of Charles I
- 1309–1343 Robert of Naples the Wise, Duke of Calabria (1296–1309), King of Naples and (nominal) Jerusalem and Sicily (1309), son of Charles II
- 1343–1382 Joan I of Naples, Queen of Naples and (nominal) Jerusalem and Sicily (1343–1381)
- 1348–1362 Louis I of Naples, King of Naples and (nominal) Jerusalem and Sicily, as husband of Joan I of Naples

Queen Joan died heirless, leaving the county to Louis I of Anjou, son of King John II of France the Good, of the House of Valois, and great-great-grandson of Charles II of Naples.

=== Valois-Anjou dynasty ===
- 1382–1384 Louis I of Anjou, Count and then Duke of Anjou (1351), Duke of Calabria and Count of Maine (1356), Duke of Touraine (1370), nominal King of Sicily (1382)
- 1384–1417 Louis II of Anjou, Duke of Anjou, Calabria and Touraine, Count of Maine, nominal King of Sicily (1384), Count of Guise (1404), son of Louis I
- 1417–1434 Louis III of Anjou, Duke of Anjou and Touraine, nominal King of Sicily (1417), Duke of Calabria (1424), son of Louis II
- 1434–1480 René I of Naples the Good, Count of Guise (1417–1422), Duke of Lorraine and Bar (1431), King of Naples and (nominal) Sicily and Jerusalem (1434–1442), Duke of Anjou and Touraine (1434), King of Aragon and Count of Barcelona (in dispute, 1466–1472), son of Louis II
- 1480–1481 Charles III (V of Maine), also known as Charles of Maine, Count of Maine and Guise (1472), nephew of René I

Upon his death, the heirless Charles du Maine bequeathed the counties of Provence-Forcalquier to King Louis XI of France. From that point forward, the title of Count of Provence simply became one of the many hereditary titles of the French monarchs. The only time the title was used independently afterwards was by the future Louis XVIII, who was known as the Comte de Provence until the death of his nephew Louis XVII in 1795, after which he claimed the throne of France.

== Governors and grand seneschals, within France ==
=== Governors ===
- 1481–1483 Palamède de Forbin
- 1491–1493 François de Luxembourg

=== Grand seneschals ===
- 1480–1481 Pierre de La Jaille (see Château de Ranton)
- 1482–1483 Raymond de Glandevès-Faucon
- 1483 Palamède de Forbin
- 1485–1493 Aymar de Poitiers, Count of Valentinois

=== Governors – grand seneschals ===
- 1493–1503 Philip of Hachberg-Sausenberg, margrave de Hochberg
- 1504–1513 Louis d'Orléans, Count of Longueville
- 1514 Jean de Poitiers, lord of Saint-Vallier
- 1515–1525 René of Savoy, Count of Tende
- 1525–1566 Claude de Savoie, Count of Tende
- 1566–1572 Honorat I de Savoie, Count of Tende

=== Grand seneschals ===
- 1572–1582 Jean V de Pontevès, Count of Carcès
- 1582–1610 Gaspard de Pontevès, Count of Carcès
- 1610–1655 Jean de Pontevès, Count of Carcès
- 1655–1662 François de Simiane-Gordes

=== Governors ===
- 1572–1573 Gaspard de Saulx-Tavannes
- 1573–1578 Albert de Gondi, comte de Retz
- 1578–1579 François de La Baume, comte de Suze
- 1579–1586 Henri d'Angoulême, called, Henri, bâtard de Valois
- 1586–1590 Jean-Louis de Nogaret, duc d'Épernon
- 1590-1592 Bernard de Nogaret, seigneur de La Valette.
- 1592-1594 Jean-Louis de Nogaret, duc d'Épernon
- 1592–1594 Gaspard de Pontevès, comte de Carcès (the Catholic League counter appointment to the office).
- 1594–1631 Charles de Lorraine, duc de Guise
- 1631–1637 Nicolas de L'Hôpital, marquis de Vitry
- 1637–1653 Louis-Emmanuel de Valois, comte d'Alais
- 1653–1669 Louis de Bourbon-Vendôme, duc de Mercœur
- 1669–1712 Louis-Joseph de Bourbon, duc de Vendôme
- 1712–1734 Claude-Louis-Hector, duc de Villars
- 1734–1770 Honoré-Armand, duc de Villars
- 1770–1780 Camille-Louis de Lorraine
- 1780–1790 Charles-Just de Beauvau

In 1790, the French Revolution definitively ended the governorship.

== See also ==
- List of consorts of Provence

== Sources ==
- Harding, Robert (1978). Anatomy of a Power Elite: the Provincial Governors in Early Modern France. Yale University Press.
- Jouanna, Arlette (1998). Histoire et Dictionnaire des Guerres de Religion. Bouquins.
