= List of Toulousain consorts =

== Countess consort of Toulouse ==
=== Early Frankish countesses ===
Picture	Name	Father	Birth	Marriage	Became Countess	Ceased to be Countess	Death	Spouse
	Auda	Charles Martel (Carolingian)	732	742 or 750	-	after 755		Thierry
	Cunigunde	-	-	-	790 husband's accession	-		William I
	Guitburgis or Wibourg	-	-	-		806 husband replaced	-	William I
	Dhuoda	probably Sancho I of Gascony	-	24 June 824		842 husband's desposition	after 2 February 843	Bernard I

=== Senior House of Rouergue, 844–1105 ===
Picture	Name	Father	Birth	Marriage	Became Countess	Ceased to be Countess	Death	Spouse
	Oda	-	-	-	844 husband's accession	852 husband's death	-	Fredelon
	Bertheis	Remigius	-	-	852 husband's accession	863 husband's desposition	after 6 April 883	Raymond I
	Ermengarda	-	-	-	863–865 husband's appointment in opposition to Humfrid	863–865 ?	after 21 July 883	Sunyer
	Ermengarde of Auvergne	Bernard I of Auvergne or Guerin I of Auvergne	-	-	877 husband's accession	20 June 885 or 16 August 886 husband's death	after 21 July 883	Bernard III Plantapilosa
	Garsenda, Countess of Albi	Ermengol, Count of Albi	-	860	872 husband's accession	after 16 June 918 husband's death	-	Odo
	Guinidilda of Barcelona	Wifred II, Count of Barcelona (Barcelona)	-	-	after 16 June 918 husband's accession	924 husband's death	after 28 September 926	Raymond II
	Garsenda of Gascony	García II, Duke of Gascony	-	-	924 husband's accession	950 husband's death	after 972	Raymond Pons
	Gundinildis	-	-	-		972 husband's death?	-	Raymond (III) or Raymond (IV)
	Adelaide of Anjou	Fulk II, Count of Anjou (Angevins)	947	975		978 husband's death	29 May 1026	Raymond (III) or Raymond (IV)
	Arsende	-	-	-	972/8 husband's accession	-		William III Taillefer
	Emma of Provence	Rotbold II, Count of Provence	975/80	992 or before		September 1037 husband's death	1062, or after	William III Taillefer
	Majore	-	-	1022	September 1037 husband's accession	1044 or before		Pons
	Almodis de la Marche	Bernard I, Count of La Marche	-	1045		1053, after 29 June repudiated	5 April/16 August 1097	Pons
	Sancha of Aragon	Ramiro I of Aragon (Jiménez)	-	-		September 1037 husband's death	5 April/16 August 1097	Pons
	Matilda	-	-	before 1067	1060 husband's usurpation	-		William IV
	Emma de Mortain	Robert, Count of Mortain	1058	before 1080		after 1080		William IV

=== Junior House of Rouergue, 1105–1271 ===
Picture	Name	Father	Birth	Marriage	Became Countess	Ceased to be Countess	Death	Spouse
	Elvira de Castile	Alfonso VI of León and Castile	before 1082	1094	1094 husband's usurpation	28 February 1105 husband's death	after 1151	Raymond IV
	Helie of Burgundy	Odo I, Duke of Burgundy (Burgundy)	1080	June 1095	28 February 1105 husband's accession	21 April 1112 husband's death	28 February 1141	Bertrand
	Faydive d'Uzès	Raymond, Lord of Uzès	-	before 16 September 1125		16 April 1148 husband's death	-	Alfonso Jordan
	Constance of France	Louis VI of France (Capet)	1128	10 August 1154		1165 divorce	16 August, after 1177	Raymond V
	Joan of England	Henry II of England (Plantagenet)	October 1165	October 1196		4 September 1199		Raymond VI
	Damsel of Cyprus	Isaac Komnenos (Komnenoi)	1177/78	1200		October 1202 divorce	after 1204	Raymond VI
	Eleanor of Aragon	Alfonso II of Aragon (Barcelona)	1182	January 1203		2 August 1222 husband's death	February 1226	Raymond VI
	Sancha of Aragon	Alfonso II of Aragon (Barcelona)	1196	January 1211	2 August 1222 husband's accession	1241 divorce	after 1241	Raymond VII
	Margaret of Lusignan	Hugh X, Lord of Lusignan (Lusignan)	1226/8	1243		25 September 1245 divorce	1288	Raymond VII

=== House of Montfort, 1215–1224 ===
in opposition with the House of Rouergue.

Picture	Name	Father	Birth	Marriage	Became Countess	Ceased to be Countess	Death	Spouse
	Alix de Montmorency	Bouchard III, Lord of Montmorency (Noailles)	-	1190	1215 husband's conquest	25 June 1218 husband's death	25 February 1221	Simon de Montfort
	Beatrice of Viennois	Guigues VI, Dauphin of Viennois (Burgundy)	1205	1214–1222		14 January 1224 forced to return the County	17 September, after 1248	Amaury de Montfort

=== House of Bourbon, 1681–1821 ===
Picture	Name	Father	Birth	Marriage	Became Countess	Ceased to be Countess	Death	Spouse
	Marie Victoire de Noailles	Anne Jules de Noailles, duc de Noailles (Noailles)	6 May 1688	2 February 1723		1 December 1737 husband's death	30 September 1766	Louis-Alexandre
	Maria Teresa Felicitas d'Este	Francesco III d'Este, Duke of Modena (Este)	6 October 1726	29 December 1744		30 April 1754		Louis Jean Marie

Passed to the House of Orléans on the death of Louise Marie Adélaïde de Bourbon and remain unused amongst the Orleanist pretenders.

== See also ==
- List of Aquitainian consorts
- Countess of Tripoli
- List of consorts of Provence
- Duchess of Narbonne
