= Douce II of Provence =

Countess of Provence (1166), and Countess of Melguiel (1172)

Douce II

Countess of Provence
- Reign: 1166
- Predecessor: Ramon Berenguer II
- Successor: Alfonso I
- Born: c. 1162
- Died: after April 1172 (aged c. 10)
- Noble family: Barcelona
- Father: Ramon Berenguer II, Count of Provence
- Mother: Richeza of Poland

Douce II (Spanish: Dulcia, Catalan: Dolça; c. 1162–1172) was Countess of Provence and Viscountess of Gévaudan and Carlat for a few months in 1166, as well as Countess of Melgueil for some time in 1172. She was a member of the House of Barcelona, which acquired the County of Provence through the marriage of Douce I to Ramon Berenguer III, Count of Barcelona.

Coat-of-arms of Provence

== Life ==
Douce was the sole child of the Provençal count Ramon Berenguer II and the Castilian queen dowager Richeza of Poland, who married in 1162. In 1165, with the treaty signed in Beaucaire, Ramon Berenguer betrothed his infant daughter to Raymond, eldest son and heir apparent of Raymond V, ruler of the neighbouring County of Toulouse. When Ramon Berenguer died trying to conquer Nice in the spring of 1166, Douce inherited the County of Provence.

Immediately after her accession, Raymond V entered Provence to ensure that the betrothal would be honored. In order to secure his position, he attempted to arrange a marriage with Douce's mother. His efforts came to nothing due to intervention of the young King of Aragon and Count of Barcelona, Alfonso. Alfonso was the first cousin of Douce's father and his closest agnate. He and his council claimed that he had the right to Provence on the basis of Holy Roman Emperor Frederick Barbarossa's enfeoffment of 1162, and consequently he adopted the title Margrave of Provence. In order to gain time, Alfonso wrote to Raymond to tell him that he consented to the planned marriages of both Douce and her mother. Conflict soon ensued, however, and despite initial setbacks, Alfonso prevailed over Raymond. He arrived in Provence by the end of 1166. William VII of Montpellier was the first of Douce's vassals to declare allegiance to him, followed by the rest.

In 1168, Alfonso granted Provence to his brother, Ramon Berenguer III. Douce was thus finally dispossessed of her inheritance, but retained the comital title. She moved to the court of her paternal grandmother, Beatrice, Countess of Melgueil. In April 1172, Beatrice decided that the County of Melgueil should be divided between her daughter, Ermessende of Pelet, and Douce, still betrothed to Raymond of Toulouse. Douce died the same year, however, and all of Melgueil passed to her half-aunt, who also married her fiancé.

== Sources ==
- Cheyette, Fredric L. (2001). Ermengard of Narbonne and the World of the Troubadours. Cornell University Press. ISBN 0-8014-8925-3.

Preceded by Ramon Berenguer II	Countess of Provence; 1166	Succeeded by Alfonso I
Preceded by Beatrice	Countess of Melgueil; 1172; With: Ermessende	Succeeded by Ermessende as sole ruler
