= Ermengarde of Burgundy =

Countess of Provence (c. 970–1057)

Ermengarde

Countess of Provence
- Tenure: 1008 – 1010?

Queen consort of Upper Burgundy
- Tenure: 1011 – 1032
- Born: c. 970
- Died: after September 20, 1057
- Spouses: Rotbold II, Count of Provence; Rudolph III of Burgundy
- Issue: William III of Provence; Emma of Provence; Hugh, bishop of Lausanne?
- Religion: Catholicism

Ermengarde (also Hermengarde, Ermengarda, Irmengarde, Irainsanda, Eimildis) (c. 970– after 20 September 1057) was a medieval noblewoman. Through her first marriage, to Rotbold II, Count of Provence, she was countess of Provence, and from 1011 to 1032 Ermengarde was the last queen of independent Burgundy by virtue of her second marriage to Rudolf III of Burgundy.

== Life ==
Ermengarde's origins are obscure, and the identity of her relatives is unknown. Several scholars have, however, suggested that Ermengarde was related to Humbert I of Savoy. In the nineteenth century, several scholars hypothesised that Ermengarde's first husband was Manasses, count of Savoy, with whom she had a son, Humbert of Savoy. Laurent Ripart, by contrast, suggests that Ermengarde may have been the sister of Humbert of Savoy, who was part of the entourage of Rudolf III of Burgundy. Alternatively, François Demotz argues that Ermengarde was a member of the Sigiboldides (or Siboldi) dynasty, who were also part of Rudolf III's entourage.

== Countess of Provence ==
Ermengarde married Rotbald II of Provence before 1002, when they made a donation to Montmajour Abbey. The couple is mentioned in the Carta liberalis in 1005. Also in 1005, they were present for the election of the new abbot at the Abbey of St Victor, Marseille, alongside Adelaide-Blanche of Anjou and her sons William III Taillefer, Count of Toulouse, and William II, Count of Provence.

With Rotbald, Ermengarde had two sons and a daughter:

- Hugh, bishop of Lausanne (r. 1018–1037).
- William III of Provence
- Emma, who married William III Taillefer, Count of Toulouse, and thus brought the margravial title in Provence to the House of Rouergue.

== Queen of Burgundy ==
After Rotbald's death (d. before 1011), Ermengarde married again. Her second husband, whom she married in 1011, was Rudolf III of Burgundy. Ermengarde and Rudolf were married until his death in 1032, but they had no children together. On 24 April 1011 Rudolf issued two diplomas granting Ermengarde extensive property, including the town of Vienne, the royal castle of Pipet, the counties of Vienne and Sermorens, and all his possessions between Vienne and Lake Constance, as her dower. In August 1011, Ermengarde intervened in Rudolf's diploma, granting Henry, bishop of Lausanne, rights over the county of Vaud. The couple issued one diploma together, a donation to the monastery of Cluny in 1019. and Ermengarde intervened in many of Rudolf's other acts, including donations to the monastery of Saint-Martin de Savigny, and the Abbey of St. Maurice, Agaunum.

Acting independently, Ermengarde made a donation to Cluny for the sake of Rudolf's soul, and endowed the monastery of Saint-Martin de Savigny in 1031.

=== Succession of Burgundy ===
At Strasbourg in 1016, Rudolf III did homage to Emperor Henry II. At the same time, Ermengarde entrusted her sons Hugh and William to Henry II's care. Henry called Hugh and William his "beloved vassals (dilectus sibi militibus), and granted them the fiefs of Otto-William, Count of Burgundy, who had rebelled against Henry. After Rudolf's death in September 1032, Ermengarde and her son Hugh arranged for the transfer of the crown of Burgundy and the Holy Lance to Emperor Conrad II. In January 1033, Ermengarde, and her advocate (and possible relative) Humbert of Savoy, and others, do homage to Conrad II at Zurich. The actions of Ermengarde and Humbert of Savoy ensured the permanent bond between Burgundy and Germany.
