= Bertrand of Provence =

Bertrand of Provence may refer to:

- Fulk Bertrand of Provence (1018–1051), count of Provence
- William Bertrand of Provence (1051–1094), count of Provence
