= Bertrand II of Provence =

Bertrand II, otherwise William VI (died 1093), was count of Provence following the death of his father Geoffrey I of Provence, though he is not mentioned until the next year (1063). He was either the eldest or second-eldest son of Geoffrey.

There is much confusion concerning the last counts of Provence of the first and native dynasty. Both Bertrand's father Geoffrey and Geoffrey's brother Fulk Bertrand had sons named either William or Bertrand. It seems that Bertrand's cousin, Bertrand I, ruled as marchio (margrave) until his death around 1094 and was succeeded in his titles by Raymond IV of Toulouse.

By his wife Matilda, he had one daughter Cecilia, who married Bernard Ato IV, Viscount of Carcassonne.

== Sources ==
Preceded by Geoffrey I	Count of Provence; 1063–1093	Succeeded by Gerberga
