= Rotbold I of Provence =

French nobleman (died 1008)

Rotbold I, Count of Provence
- Died: 1008
- Noble family: Bosonids
- Spouse: Emilde
- Issue: Rotbold II; Gerberge
- Father: Boson II of Arles
- Mother: Constance

Rotbold I (also spelled Rothbold, Rotbald, Rodbald, Robald(us), Roubaud, or Rotbaud; died 1008) was a French nobleman. He was Count of Provence from 968 until his death and margrave from 993. He was the elder of two sons of Boso II of Provence and Constance, his younger brother being William I, who took up the title of marchio in 979 and that of dux later. He ruled with William, probably jointly over the whole county. On William's death, Rotbold was left as head of the family with the title of marchio.

He first signed a charter of his father's in March 965. He signed his brother's donation to Saint-Victor de Marseille in April 970 and to Cluny on 28 August 990. In 1005, he joined with his sister-in-law Adelaide of Anjou and his nephew William II to grant privileges to Saint-Victor.

He married Emilde, possibly a daughter of Stephen, Viscount of Gévaudan. He left one son, Rotbold II, who inherited his titles, and a daughter, Gerberge.

== Sources ==
- Lewis, Archibald R. The Development of Southern French and Catalan Society, 718–1050. University of Texas Press: Austin, 1965.
