= Boso of Arles =

Boso of Arles may refer to two counts of Arles:

- Boso, Margrave of Tuscany, who was Boso I of Arles (r. 934–936)
- Boso II of Arles (r. 949–967)
