= Geoffrey I =

Geoffrey I may refer to:

- Geoffrey I, Count of Anjou (died 987)
- Geoffrey I, Duke of Brittany (980–1008)
- Geoffrey I of Provence (died between 1061 and 1063)
- Geoffrey I of Conversano or Geoffrey the Elder (died September 1100)
- Geoffrey I of Villehardouin (c. 1169–c. 1229)
- Geoffrey I of Vianden (1273–1310)
