= Louis V of France =

King of West Francia from 979 to 987

Louis V
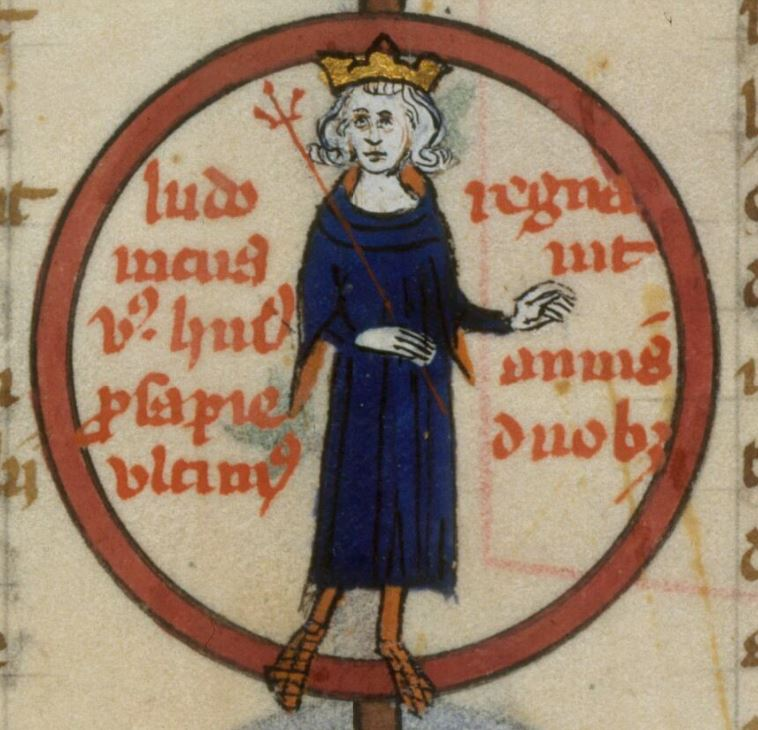
- 14th century miniature

King of West Francia
- Reign: 2 March 986 – 22 May 987
- Coronation: 8 June 979
- Predecessor: Lothair
- Successor: Hugh Capet
- Born: 966/967
- Died: 22 May 987 (aged 20–21); Forest of Halatte, Oise
- Burial: Saint Corneille Abbey, Compiègne
- Spouse: Adelaide-Blanche of Anjou (m. 982; ann. 984)
- Dynasty: Carolingian
- Father: Lothair of France
- Mother: Emma of Italy

Louis V (c. 966 or 967 – 22 May 987), also known as Louis the Lazy (French: Louis le Fainéant), was a king of West Francia from 979 (co-reigning first with his father Lothair until 986) to his early death in 987. During his reign, the nobility essentially ruled the country. Dying childless, Louis V was the last Carolingian monarch in West Francia.

== Youth ==
Born in c. 966, Louis was the eldest son of King Lothair of France, the Carolingian ruler of France, and Queen Emma, daughter of King Lothair II of Italy and Empress Adelaide. Louis was associated to the government by his father in 978 and crowned co-king on 8 June 979 at the Abbey of Saint-Corneille in Compiègne by Archbishop Adalbero of Reims.

== Marriage ==
In 982 at Vieille-Brioude, Haute-Loire, the fifteen-year-old Louis was married to the forty-year-old Adelaide-Blanche of Anjou, sister of Count Geoffrey I and twice a widow from her previous marriages with Count Stephen of Gévaudan and Count Raymond of Toulouse, Prince of Gothia. This union was purely political and arranged by the king – following the advice of Queen Emma and Count Geoffrey I – with the double purpose of restoring the Carolingian royal power in the south of the kingdom, and (according to Richerus) to obtain the support of the local southern lords in his fight against the Robertians. Being related by marriage to two of the most powerful southern comital families of the Kingdom, Lothair believed that he could confront the power of Hugh Capet.

Immediately after their wedding, Louis and Adelaide-Blanche were crowned king and queen of Aquitaine by Adelaide's brother Bishop Guy of Le Puy. From the very beginning, however, the mismatched couple was unable to live peacefully together, not only due to the notorious age difference between them, but (according to Richerus) also because of Louis' reported affairs:

[...] They had almost no conjugal love; because Louis had barely reached puberty, and Adelaide was old, there was only incompatibility and disagreements between them. They did not share a common bedroom as they could not bear it; when they had to travel, each took a separate residence, and when they were forced to talk, their conversations were in the open air and were never long, but only lasted for a few words. They lived in this way for two years, until they obtained the divorce for their opposite characters. [...] Louis, who did not have a tutor, indulged himself in all sorts of frivolity due to his young age.

In 984, after two years of childless union (and according to Rodulfus Glaber), Adelaide tricked her young husband into making a visit to Aquitaine, and once there, she left him and returned to her family, marrying shortly thereafter Count William I of Provence:

When the young prince reached adolescence, Lothair made him king and appointed him his successor; he also chose for him a princess of Aquitaine as his wife, but soon she perceived that the young man would not inherit the talents of his father. Therefore she decided to separate from her husband; and for this purpose she adroitly convinced him to make a trip to her province of Aquitaine, assuming that her hereditary rights there guaranteed her the possession of the land. Louis, without suspecting the artifice, yielded to the advice of his wife, and went with her. When they were in Aquitaine, she left her husband to join her family.

However, despite being recorded by relative contemporary and later sources (Richerus, Rodulfus Glaber, the Chronicon Andegavensi and the Chronicle of Saint-Maxence, among others), the existence of this marriage was recently challenged by historian Carlrichard Brülh.

== Reign ==
Carolingian-ruled lands (in yellow) formed a small part of West Francia by the 10th century

Upon his father's death on 2 March 986, the already-crowned Louis V became the undisputed king of the Franks. At that time, however, there existed in the Frankish court two factions: one led by Archbishop Adalberon of Reims and Queen Emma, who, being strongly influenced by her mother Empress Adelaide, wanted the renewal of friendly relationships with the Ottonian dynasty; the other faction wanted to continue Lothair's policy, and taking advantage of the minority of Emperor Otto III, wanted a policy of expansion to the east and the recovery of Lotharingia. In addition, the young monarch inherited a battle between his father's line of elected kings (which had been interrupted twice by Robertians and once by the Bosonids), and the Ottonian house of Emperor Otto I. As defender of Rome, Otto I had the power to name the clergy in Carolingian territory, and the clergy he had named were not supporting the Carolingians.

Initially, Queen Emma dominated the situation, but in the summer of 986 there was a reversal: the Anti-Ottonian party prevailed, after which she was forced to leave court and seek refuge with Hugh Capet. This event also put Adalberon in a predicament: having been elevated by Otto I to the powerful Archbishopric of Reims, he was forced to leave his episcopal seat and took refuge in one of his fortresses on the Meuse river, which belonged to the Ottonian sphere. The escape of the archbishop was perceived by Louis V as treason; he turned violently against Adalberon and threatened him with a siege of Reims. The matter was finally settled in a trial court at Compiègne. Before this meeting, however, Louis V changed his mind and sought a reconciliation with Adalberon, and so in the spring of 987, he planned a peace meeting with Empress Theophanu, who acted on behalf of her son Otto III. Before all these tangled events were resolved, Louis V died on 22 May 987 from a fall while hunting in the Forest of Halatte near the town of Senlis, Oise. He was buried in the Abbey of Saint-Corneille in Compiègne.

Louis V left no legitimate heirs, so his uncle Charles, Duke of Lower Lorraine, was nominated as the hereditary successor to the throne. But the clergy, including both Adalberon and Gerbert (who later became Pope Sylvester II), argued eloquently for the election of Hugh Capet, who was not only of royal blood but had proven himself through his actions and his military might. Hugh was elected to the Frankish throne and Adalberon crowned him, all within two months of Louis V's death. Thus the rule of the Carolingian dynasty ended and the Capetian era had begun.

== Notes ==
Regnal titles
Preceded by Lothair	King of West Francia; 986–987	Succeeded by Hugh Capet
