= Richeza of Poland =

Richeza of Poland may refer to:

- Richeza of Poland, Queen of Castile
- Richeza of Poland, Queen of Hungary
- Richeza of Poland, Queen of Sweden
