= William III of Provence =

Count of Provence in France

William III (died after 1037) was the count and margrave of Provence from 1014 to his death. He inherited the titles of his father Rotbold II but preceded his cousin William IV as count.

His mother was Ermengarde, later the second wife of Rudolph III of Burgundy. He is recorded as late as 1032 with the title of marchio and is last recorded donating property to Cluny in 1037. William had no known descendants and he left his margravial rights to his sister, Emma, who married William III Taillefer, Count of Toulouse, and thus brought the margravial title in Provence to the House of Toulouse.

William III of Provence Bosonids Born: 1014 Died: 1062
Preceded by Rotbold II	Margrave of Provence; 1014-c. 1037	Succeeded by Emma
Preceded by Rotbold II	Count of Provence; 1014-c. 1037	Succeeded by William IV
