= Berenguer Ramon of Provence =

Count of Provence (1115-1144)

Berenguer Ramon, Count of Provence

Count of Provence
- Reign: 1131–1144
- Predecessor: Ramon Berenguer III, Count of Barcelona
- Successor: Ramon Berenguer II, Count of Provence
- Born: 1115
- Died: 1144 (aged 28–29); County of Melgueil
- Noble family: Barcelona
- Spouse: Beatrice of Melgueil
- Issue: Ramon Berenguer II, Count of Provence
- Father: Ramon Berenguer III, Count of Barcelona
- Mother: Douce I, Countess of Provence

Berenguer Ramon (Catalan: Berenguer Ramon) (1115–1144) was the count of Provence (1131–1144). He was the younger son of Ramon Berenguer III, Count of Barcelona, and Douce I, Countess of Provence. While his older brother Raymond Berengar received Barcelona (his father's inheritance), he received Provence (his mother's).

In 1132, Berenguer was in a succession war against Alfonso Jordan, Count of Toulouse, over the county of Melgueil. Alfonso was defeated and Berenguer married Beatrice, heiress of Melgueil. His reign was occupied in wars with the family of Baux, which claimed the county of Provence. Berenguer also took an offensive against Genoa, but died at Melgueil in 1144. His son Raymond Berengar succeeded him in Provence, but the county of Melgueil went to Beatrice' second husband, Bernard V Pelet, and their daughter Ermessende of Pelet.

== Sources ==
- Graham-Leigh, Elaine (2005). The Southern French Nobility and the Albigensian Crusade. The Boydell Press.

Preceded by Raymond Berengar I	Count of Provence; 1131–1144	Succeeded by Raymond Berengar II
