= Gerberga of Provence =

Gerberga
- Countess of Provence
- Born: c. 1060
- Died: 1115
- Noble family: Bosonids
- Spouse: Gilbert I of Gévaudan
- Issue: Douce I, Countess of Provence
- Father: Geoffrey I of Provence
- Mother: Etiennette

Gerberga (1045/65–1115), also spelled Gerberge or Gerburge, was the Countess of Provence for more than a decade, until 1112. Provence is a region located in the southeastern part of modern-day France that did not become part of France until 1481 (well after Gerberga's time).

Countess Gerberga was a daughter of Geoffrey I of Provence and his wife Etiennette of Marseille. She became Countess of Provence upon the death of her brother, Bertrand II, in 1093.

She and her husband, Gilbert I of Gévaudan, were considered virtuous. He participated in the Crusades, donating many relics from the Middle East to churches in Provence. Gilbert later died in 1108. Gerberga then took control of the government, and is said to have ruled wisely. In 1112, her eldest daughter Douce was married to Raymond Berengar III of Barcelona at which point Provence was ceded to him. Her second daughter, Stephanie, would lay claim to the county and thus precipitate the Baussenque Wars in 1144.

== Sources ==
- Cheyette, Fredric L. (1999). "Women, Poets, and Politics in Occitania". In Evergates, Theodore (ed.). Aristocratic Women in Medieval France. University of Pennsylvania Press. p. 138-.
- de Manteyer, Georges (1908). La Provence du premier au douzième siècle (in French). Vol. 2. Librairie Alphonse Picard et Fils.

Preceded by Bertrand II	Countess of Provence; 1093–1112	Succeeded by Douce I Raymond Berengar I
