= Raymond III of Toulouse =

French noble

Raymond III is the designation assigned to distinct or possibly-distinct counts of Toulouse in the mid-to-late 10th century. Recent scholarship has overturned the traditional account of the counts during this period without consensus arising for a new reconstruction.

== Traditional reconstruction ==
Until recently, Raymond III was the numerical designation assigned Raymond Pons, who seems to have succeeded his father as the count of Toulouse before 926, and who is last seen in 944, apparently being dead by 969. In that year his widow, Garsenda, appears, acting alone. It was thought that she then acted as guardian for Raymond's successor and (supposed) son, William III, who appears along with his wife Emma in the early 11th century. This reconstruction was not without problems. Not only was the chronology of this single generation long, but it is at odds with a surviving apparently-contemporary pedigree found in the Códice de Roda. The surviving manuscript of this collection of genealogies is of a later date, but is thought to derive from a 10th-century original. In its account of the counts of Toulouse, it shows Garsenda, daughter of Duke García II Sánchez of Gascony, to have married (Raymond) Pons, having by him one son, Raymond, who in turn is given children Hugh and Raymond. William (III) is not mentioned. Likewise, the will of Garsenda fails to name William.

== Reevaluation ==
This consensus reconstruction was shown to be flawed by the discovery of a 992 charter of William III and his wife Emma which explicitly named William's mother as the still-living 'Adelaix'. While this document shows that William was not son of Raymond Pons and Garsenda, it does little to illuminate the true relationships, and several scholars have proposed alternative solutions. These are in agreement with regard to the identity of William's mother. She is identified with Adelaide of Anjou, who as the widow of the deceased Raymond of Gothia, married first King Louis V of France and then Count William III of Provence. Her husband, the 'Prince of Gothia', had previously gone unrecognized or had been dismissed as inaccurate, but given the historical association of this title with the County of Toulouse, the identification of William's mother with Adelaide of Anjou is now accepted. This means that William's father was a previously unrecognized Count Raymond of Toulouse, but his relationship to the previous documented count, Raymond Pons, remains a matter of debate, with several competing theories being proposed.

== Reconstruction 1 ==
Thierry Stasser identified Adelaide's husband with the last-named family member appearing in the Roda pedigree, the brother of Hugh, both sons of an earlier Raymond and grandsons of Raymond Pons and Garsenda. This Stasser harmonized with the will of Garsenda, in which she names her nepotes (grandsons or nephews) Hugh and Raymond, children of Guidinilda. He would thus introduce two generations, both named Raymond, between Raymond Pons and William III. The first would be the husband of Guidinilda and the father of Hugh and Raymond, with the latter in turn being the husband of Adelaide and father of William III. Given that Garsenda referred to Hugh and Raymond only by the names of their mother, it may be that the elder of the new Raymonds had likewise died by 969. The addition of as many as three additional counts (Raymond, Hugh and Raymond) would displace the numbering of all subsequent counts named Raymond.

Stasser reconstruction of 10th-century Toulouse counts

Raymond Pons; Count of Toulouse | Garsenda
Raymond (III); Count of Toulouse | Guidinildis
Hugh (?) Count of Toulouse | Raymond (IV); Count of Toulouse | Adelaide of Anjou
William III; Count of Toulouse

== Reconstruction 2 ==
Martin de Framond suggested two alternatives, the first of which introduced just one intervening generation. He suggests that Raymond Pons and Garsenda were succeeded by a son Raymond, who as in the Codice de Roda had sons Hugh and Raymond, but that as widower of Guidinilda he subsequently married Adelaide, having younger son but eventual heir William. The addition of just a single additional count Raymond in this reconstruction has allowed the traditional numbering to be massaged—some subsequent compilers have used the byname to distinguish Raymond Pons, and then referred to the subsequent novel count as Raymond III, without changing the traditional numbering of subsequent counts of that name.

First Framond reconstruction of 10th-century Toulouse counts

Raymond Pons; Count of Toulouse | Garsenda
Guidinildis | Raymond (III); Count of Toulouse | Adelaide of Anjou
Raymond | Hugh | William III; Count of Toulouse

== Reconstruction 3 ==
In his second reconstruction, Martin de Framond placed more weight on the will of Garsenda, which could be read as implying that she left no children. He suggests that the nepotes Hugh and Raymond were children of Raymond II, Count of Rouergue, the nephew of Raymond Pons and his heir-male were he to die without sons. He suggests that Raymond of Rouergue may have succeeded his uncle as Count of Toulouse, and that the husband of Adelaide was son of this count, a like-named half-brother to Raymond III of Rouergue.

Second Framond reconstruction of 10th-century Toulouse counts

Raymond Pons; Count of Toulouse | Garsenda | Ermengol; Count of Rouergue
Bertha of Tuscany | Raymond II/(III); Count of Rouergue and Toulouse | Guidinildis
Raymond III; Count of Rouergue | Adelaide of Anjou | Raymond (IV); Count of Toulouse | Hugh
William III; Count of Toulouse

Given the lack of consensus over these possible reconstructions, the name Raymond III, originally referring to Raymond Pons, is now ambiguous. It can still refer to Raymond Pons, to a hypothesized son who married successively Guidinilda and Adelaide of Anjou, to a hypothesized son who was husband of Guidinilda and father-in-law of Adelaide, or to Raymond II, Count of Rouergue. No consensus has arisen regarding these alternative reconstructions, nor on how previous hypotheses identifying possible siblings of William III fit into these new rearranged pedigrees.

== Sources ==
- Martin de Framond, "La succession des comtes de Toulouse autour de l'an mil (940-1030): reconsiderations", Annales du Midi 105 (1993): 461–488.
- Christian Settipani, La Noblesse du Midi Carolingien (Prosopographia et Genealogica 5, 2004)
- Thierry Stasser, "Adélaïde d'Anjou, sa famille, ses unions, sa descendance - Etat de las question", Le Moyen Age 103 (1997): 9-52
