= Nemfidius =

8th century ruler of Provence

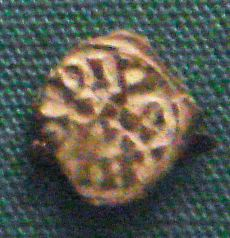
Base silver coin of Nemfidius, patriarch of Provence, 700–710, minted at Marseille.

Nemfidius was Patriarch of Provence around 700 CE, during the time of Pepin of Herstal (687–714). He was succeeded by Antenor. Nemfidius issued coins, some of which have reached us.
