= Counts of Arles =

This is a list of the counts of Arles.

- Garin, or Warin, (until 853), also Guerin in French, Garí in Spanish, and Guerí in Catalan; also duke of Toulouse (835–840), margrave of Burgundy, and count of Autun, Mâcon, Chalon, Mementois, and Auxois
- Isembard, Count of Autun (853–858), also count of Mâcon, Chalon, Dijon, Empúries, Rosselló, and Barcelona
- Gerard (858–868)
- Boso I (868–879), also count of Bourges and Vienne (871–879), king of Provence (879–887)
- Theobald (879–895)
- Boso, (895–911), also margrave of Tuscany (931–936)
- Hugh (911–923), son of Theobald, also King of Italy (924–947)
- Rotbold I (923–928), also Rotbaud or Roubaud in French and Catalan
- Rotbold II (928–948), also Rotbaud or Roubaud in French and Catalan
- Boso II (948–965)
- William I of Provence (968–)

To Provence (see Counts of Provence), where Boso's son, Rotbold II of Provence is named first count.
