= Geoffrey I of Provence =

Count of Provence and Arles

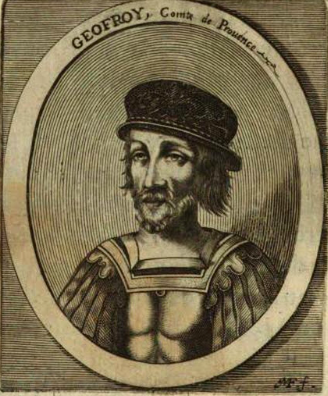
- Geoffrey I of Provence
- Died: c. 1062
- Noble family: Bosonids
- Spouse: Etiennette
- Issue: Bertrand II of Provence; Daughter (name unknown); Stephanie; Gerberga, Countess of Provence
- Father: William II of Provence
- Mother: Gerberga of Burgundy

Geoffrey I or Josfred (died February between 1061 and 1063) was the joint Count of Provence with his elder brothers William IV and Fulk from 1018 to his death. He was the third son of William II of Provence and Gerberga of Burgundy and a scion of the younger line of the family. It is possible that he did not carry the title "count" until after the death of his eldest brother William around 1032.

== Count ==
He became Count of Arles in 1032 and he and Fulk made a donation to the Abbey of Cluny on 26 May 1037. During his brother's life, he was secondary to him. With the death of his brother, he became sole count with the title marchyo sive comes Provincie. The title of marchio (margrave) implied that he was the head of the dynasty.

He was a great builder of the church in his region, devastated in the previous century by Saracen raids. He restored the abbey of Sparro, which they had destroyed, and gave it to the archiepiscopal see of Aix. Following the example of most of his ancestors, he was a patron of Saint Victor in Marseille. In 1045, he consented to a donation of one of his vicecomital vassals to the monastery and in March 1048 to the transferral of property from Raimbaud, Archbishop of Arles, to the church. On 1 July 1055 and again in 1057, with his wife Etiennette and his son Bertrand, he himself donated property to St Victor. His patronage far exceeded his predecessors however. He relinquished his rights over any lands the viscount of Marseilles, Fulk, wished to donate to the monastery in 1044, while in 1032 he had consented to turn over lands to the church as allods.

In 1038, he gave over comital rights which had been possessed of his house since the reign of his great-grandfather William the Liberator to his vassals, losing control over many castles and fortresses. The royal fisc, which had been under control of the counts of Provence since the time of William, was mostly parcelled out as allods to the vassals during Geoffrey's tenure and the weakening of the county of Provence as a united polity can be dated from his reign. Even when Rudolf III of Burgundy, his lord, sold any remaining rights over some royal villae, Geoffrey gave these away as allodial holdings.

== Marriage and children ==
Geoffrey and Etiennette had:

- Bertrand, succeeded his father
- Daughter (name unknown), became the first wife of Raymond IV of Toulouse
- Stephanie, married William II of Besalú
- Gerberga, married Gilbert I of Gévaudan.

== Sources ==
- de Manteyer, Georges (1908). La Provence du premier au douzième siècle (in French). Vol. 2. Librairie Alphonse Picard et Fils.
