= Isarn (bishop of Grenoble) =

Bishop of Grenoble from 950 until his death in 976 or later

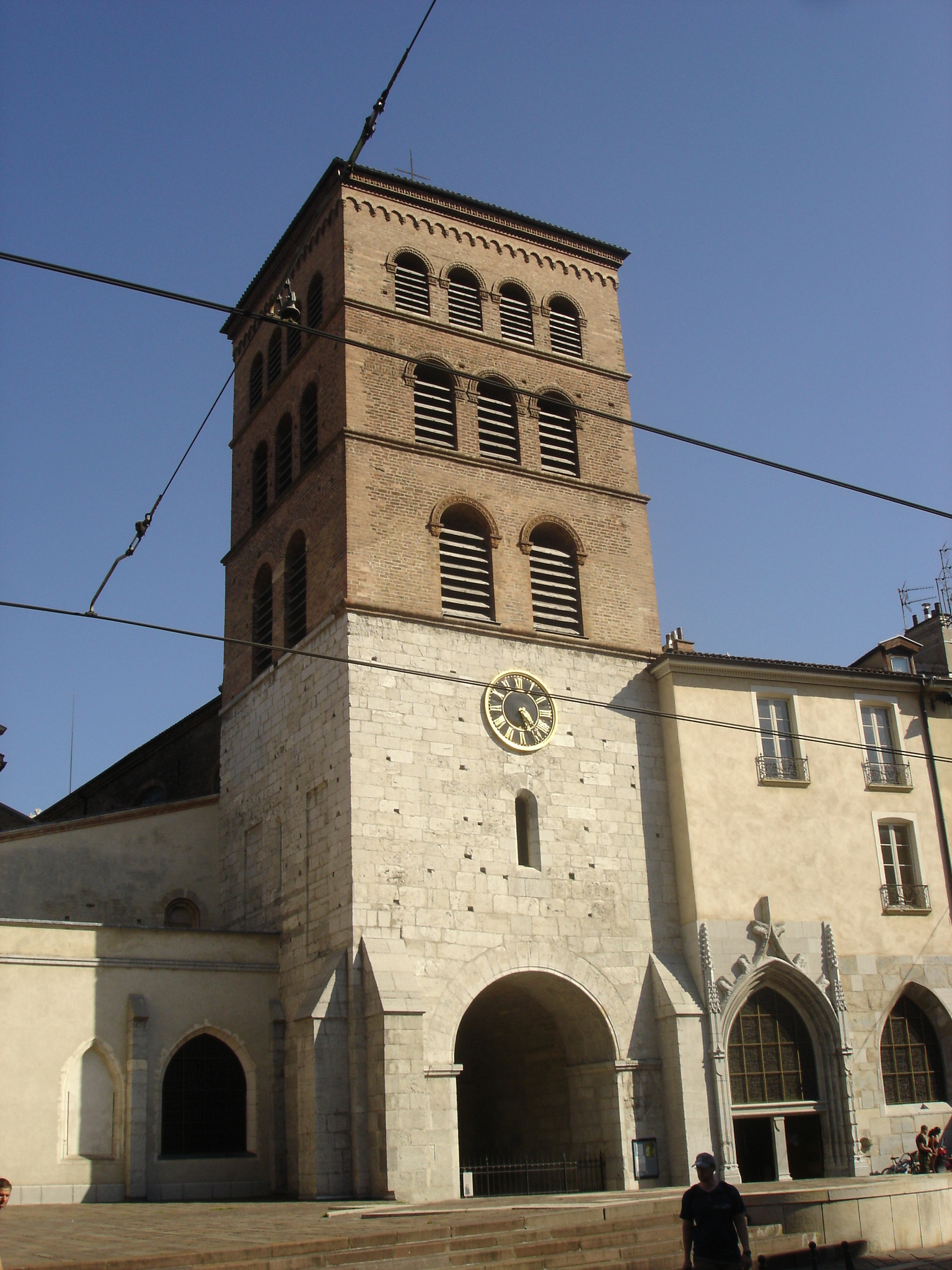
The pre-romanesque Cathedral of Grenoble dates from Isarn's episcopate

Isarnus (Isarn, in French) was the Bishop of Grenoble from 950 until his death in 976 or later. During the reign of Conrad the Peaceful he was instrumental in re-asserting Christian political authority in the south of the Kingdom of Burgundy, overrun by Saracens, and in restoring the shattered Church in the region. His methods in expelling the Saracens from his diocese, were similar to those used by his successful contemporary, William the Liberator in Provence.

Isarn belonged to the family of the counts of Graisivaudan (Gravaisdun), a precursor district of the Dauphiné, whose patronage of abbeys and proprietary churches resulted in considerable control of the local church at the time. Isarn was loyal to the diocese, however, being one of the few noblemen of the region not to flee the conquest of Grenoble by the Saracens. In 965 Isarn led a counterattack against the Saracens ("Moors") and removed them from his diocese.

In 972 a raiding party of Saracens from Fraxinetum captured Mayeuil, abbot of Cluny, while he was returning from a visit to Rome. According to Archibald Lewis, "it was this action which probably at last forced action against them." Isarn began a programme of encastellation to bring the Dauphiné back under Christian control. According to later sources, the bishop had in fact begun his castle-building programme not long after 950. Between that date and 974 Isarn had many castles constructed throughout his diocese, over all of which he maintained dominatio et servitia (lordship and service). He also pursued the re-cultivation of abandoned soil and the restoration of abandoned churches and monasteries.

In c. 976, Bishop Isarnus participated in Bishop Anno of Valence's excommunication of one Aikardus, who was holding property illegally.

One document, from c. 1100, refers to the re-colonisation of some Alpine areas under Isarn's direction. Charters of this period are rare. Only one, from 976, shows the bishop granting a small piece of land as a medium plantum. Another charter, c. 1040, details the foeff of Ainardus de Domena, including two mansi which had been given by Bishop Isarnus to his grandfather. Elsewhere in a charter, but with no specifics, we are told that Isarn granted castles and land to nobiles, mediores et pauperes: noblemen, the middle class, and the poor. One method used to put uncultivated soil back into use was probably also used to resettle wasteland. A person could be charged with replanting a large tract of land or rebuilding a set of houses in return for his owning a precarium or usufruct on half of them for his lifetime. This method of resettlement and redefence led to castles which were half owned by the bishop and half by those who occupied them.

In an eleventh-century dispute between Hugh of Châteauneuf and Guigues III of Albon over the possession of ecclesiastic lands in the Gravaisdun, Hugh, to reinforce what he judged to be his right, fabricated a story of Isarn reconquering by arms the diocese of Grenoble from the hands of the Saracens. That was the object of the preamble to a series of documents designed to establish the right of the diocese over those lands, documents known as the "Cartularies of Saint Hugh".

There is no positive evidence of the date of Bishop Isoard's death.

== Sources ==
- Addison, Agnes (1940). Review of La Cathédrale de Grenoble du IXe au XVIe Siècle, Pierre David, ed. American Journal of Archaeology, 44:2 (Apr.–Jun.), p. 283.
- Hauréau, Jean-Barthélemy (1865). Gallia christiana. (in Latin). vol. XVI, Paris 1865. pp. 226-228.
- Lewis, Archibald Ross (1965). The Development of Southern French and Catalan Society, 718–1050. Austin: University of Texas Press.
- Versteegh, Kees (1990). "The Arab presence in France and Switzerland in the 10th century." Arabica, 37:359–388.
