= Metrannus of Provence =

Patrician of Provence

Metrannus was the Patrician of Provence around the year 700, when he appeared in control of Marseille according to the Passio Leudegarii.

== Sources ==
- Lewis, Archibald R. "The Dukes in the Regnum Francorum, A.D. 550-751." Speculum, Vol. 51, No 3 (July 1976), pp 381–410.
