= William IV of Provence =

11th-century count of Provence

- Died: By 1030
- Noble family: Bosonids
- Father: William II of Provence
- Mother: Gerberga of Burgundy

William IV (Note: The numbering of the early counts of Provence differs between authors. Manteyer numbers him William V and his father William IV, counting his grandfather William the Liberator as William II.) (died by 1030) was the eldest son of William II, count of Provence, and from his father's death in 1018 or 1019 the heir to the county jointly with his younger brothers Fulk Bertrand and Geoffrey. Provence then formed part of the Kingdom of Arles.

William's mother was Gerberga, a daughter of Otto-William, count of Burgundy and Mâcon. His father first named him in a donation of the church of Saint-Martin at Manosque to the abbey of Saint-Victor of Marseille in 1013. William II died after 30 May 1018 according to Manteyer, or in 1019 according to more recent accounts. His sons did not at once bear the comital title; Manteyer supposed they were still too young to receive it. In 1018 and 1019 William appears beside his mother in donations to Saint-Victor and to Saint-André-lès-Avignon concerning the counties of Aix, Riez, Sisteron and Avignon. In these acts he is named first among the brothers and he bore the hereditary name of his father and grandfather; from this Manteyer concluded that he was the eldest of the three sons.

William does not appear in the record after 1019, unless he is the William named in an act of 1025. He died unmarried, aged at most about twenty, and was certainly dead by 1030, when his brother Fulk Bertrand first appears as count alongside Geoffrey. The two younger brothers inherited the whole comital estate of their father.

== Sources ==
- Aurell, Martin; Boyer, Jean-Paul; Coulet, Noël (2005). La Provence au Moyen Âge (in French). Aix-en-Provence: Publications de l'Université de Provence. ISBN 978-2-85399-617-4.
- Manteyer, Georges de (1908). La Provence du premier au douzième siècle: études d'histoire et de géographie politique. Mémoires et documents publiés par la Société de l'École des chartes (in French). Paris: Alphonse Picard.
