= Geoffrey II of Provence =

French count of Forcalquier (died 1067)

Geoffrey II (also Josfred or Josfredus; died 13 February 1067) was the first count of Forcalquier following the death of his father Fulk Bertrand in 1062. His elder brother William Bertrand inherited Provence, but not the title of margrave. Geoffrey himself is often counted amongst the co-counts of Provence of the era. It is not certain that his region of Forcalquier was regarded as a distinct entity and not merely the Provençal demesne under his charge.

He subscribed a charter of his brothers on 14 February 1064. His wife was Ermengard, but his children are unknown.
