= Douce I of Provence =

12th-century French noblewoman

Douce I

Countess of Provence
- Reign: 1112–1127
- Predecessor: Gerberga
- Successor: Berenguer Ramon
- Born: c. 1090
- Died: 1127 (aged c. 37)
- Spouse: Ramon Berenguer III, Count of Barcelona
- Issue Detail: Berengaria of Barcelona; Ramon Berenguer IV, Count of Barcelona; Berenguer Ramon, Count of Provence
- Father: Gilbert I of Gévaudan
- Mother: Gerberga, Countess of Provence

Douce I (also Dulcia or Dolça, called "of Rouergue" or "of Gévaudan") (c. 1090 – 1127) was the daughter of Gilbert I of Gévaudan and Gerberga of Provence and wife of Ramon Berenguer III, Count of Barcelona. In 1112, she inherited the county of Provence through her mother. She married Ramon Berenguer at Arles on 3 February that year.

== Life ==
In 1113, Douce ceded her rights in Provence, Gévaudan, and the viscounty of Millau to her husband. According to a once prevailing opinion, "Provençal troubadours ... entered Catalonia at the time" and even the Catalan language was imported from Provence. According to nationalist historians it was the beginning of l'engrandiment occitànic (the Occitan aggrandisement): a great scheme to unite various lands on both sides of the Pyrenees.

In reality the marriage gave the House of Barcelona extensive interests in Occitania and put it in conflict with the counts of Toulouse, with whom a partition of Provence was signed in 1125, shortly before Douce's death. Her death inaugurated a period of instability in Provence. A cadet branch of the House of Barcelona was set up to rule, but a disputed succession opened up the Baussenque Wars (1144–1162), which terminated in her heirs' victory.

Her children with Ramon Berenguer were:

- Almodis, married Ponce de Cervera
- Berenguela (1116–1149), married Alfonso VII of Castile
- Ramon Berenguer (1113–1162), count of Barcelona
- Berenguer Ramon (c. 1115–1144), count of Provence
- Bernard, died young

== In the arts ==
In 2024, Catalan author Antoni Veciana Ribes published the novel Dolça a la torre de fang ("Douce at the tower of mud"), a fictionalized account of Douce's life and her marriage to Ramon Berenguer.

Preceded by Gerberga	Countess of Provence; 1112–1127; With: Ramon Berenguer I	Succeeded by Berenguer Ramon
