= William II of Provence =

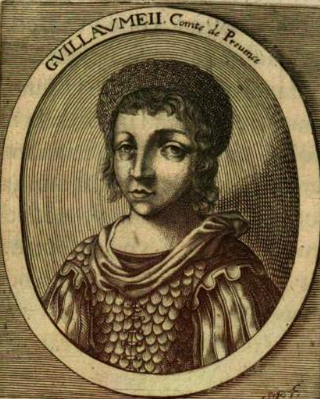
- Born: late 980s
- Died: 4 March 1019
- Noble family: House of Arles
- Spouse: Gerberga of Burgundy
- Issue: William IV of Provence; Fulk Bertrand of Provence; Geoffrey I of Provence
- Father: William I of Provence
- Mother: Adelaide-Blanche of Anjou

William II (or III) (late 980s – 4 March1019), called the Pious, was the Count of Provence at that time putting him under the Kingdom of Arles.

== Life ==
William was the son of William I (or II) of Provence and Adelaide-Blanche of Anjou, who were married by January 984. William appears in the documents of his father from 992, and succeeded the elder William on the latter's retirement to a monastery just before his death in 994, but as a minor he fell under the control of his paternal uncle, Rotbold I, who would intervene with William and his mother, Adelaide, until Rotbold's death in 1008. (Note: Countess Adelaide was called his mother and guardian in a document in the cartulary of the Abbey of Montmajour (F. de Marin de Carranrais, L'Abbaye de Montmajour. E'tude Historique, etc., Marseille, 1877). Europäische Stammtafeln n.s. II, 187, shows Adelaide-Blanche marrying William's father c. 984-86 and concludes that young William must have been born to his father's first wife, Arsinde. Argument for Arsinde as William's mother has also been based on his marriage to Gerberga of Burgundy. Her father, Count Otto-William, was once thought to have been a fifth husband of the widowed dowager countess of Provence, Adelaide-Blanche, which would have placed their children's marriage within prohibited affinity. (See Constance Bouchard, 'Consanguinity and Noble Marriages in the Tenth and Eleventh Centuries', Speculum, Vol. 56, No. 2 (Apr., 1981), pp. 268–287). However, this was based on a misunderstanding of a document that referred to Otto William and Adelaide-Blanche without ever indicating the two were married. Several recent scholars who specifically studied the question see no bar to making William II Adelaide's son, as he is explicitly called in contemporary documents.) William did not succeed to the margravial title, which went to Rotbold.

By 1013, he had married Gerberga, daughter of Otto-William, Count of Burgundy and Ermentrude, Countess of Mâcon and Besançon. Due to his relative youth, throughout his rule William faced challenges from the Provençal lords, including the seizing of his family's ecclesiastical interests. These conflicts escalated until William died 4 March 1019, while fighting the castellans of Fos and Hyères, and the two widows, Adelaide and Gerberga, were forced to call on the assistance of Adelaide's older son, William III, Count of Toulouse, to protect the birthright of the young heirs.

== Family ==
Together William and Gerberga had:

- William IV of Provence († c. 1019–1030), who succeeded his father.
- Fulk Bertrand of Provence († 27 Apr. 1051), Count of Provence.
- Geoffrey I of Provence († c. Feb. 1061–62), Count of Arles, Margrave of Provence.

== Sources ==
- Bouchard, Constance Brittain (1987). Sword, Miter, and Cloister: Nobility and the Church in Burgundy, 980-1198. Cornell University Press.
- Settipani, Christian (2004). La Noblesse du Midi Carolingien. Oxford: Unit for Prosopographical Research.
- Stasser, Thierry (1997). "Adélaïde d'Anjou, sa famille, ses unions, sa descendance - Etat de las question". Le Moyen Âge: Revue d'histoire et de philologie. 103. De Boeck Supérieur: 9-52.

== See also ==
- Jean-Pierre Poly, La Provence et la société féodale 879–1166 (Paris: Bordas, 1976)
