= Stephen, Viscount of Gévaudan =

Stephen (Stephanus), who died in 970, was Viscount Gevaudan from 954 to 970. He was the son of Bertrand, Viscount Gevaudan, and Ermengarde.

== Biography ==
He governed Saint-Julien Brioude and Mende, and dominated southern Auvergne. Even though he had the power, he did not bear the title of "Count of Gevaudan," although that title was awarded several centuries later.

He first married a woman named Anne (attested in 943). From this marriage, he probably had a daughter:

- Emildis, married to Rotbold I, Count of Provence.

Widowed, around 967 he married Adelaide of Anjou († 1026), daughter of Fulk II, Count of Anjou and Gerberge. They had :

- William, (c. 955–975).
- Pons, Count of Gévaudan and Forez. He died aft. 26 February 1011.
- Stephen II, Archbishop of Puy.
- Bertrand, Count of Gévaudan.
- Almodis of Gévaudan, she married Adalbert I de Charroux, Count de la Haute March.
- Philippa of Gévaudan, married William d'Auvergne, possibly named Bertha.
