= Ramon Berenguer II of Provence =

French count of Provence (c. 1135-1166)

Ramon Berenguer II

Count of Provence
- Reign: 1144–1166
- Predecessor: Berenguer Ramon, Count of Provence
- Successor: Douce II, Countess of Provence
- Born: c. 1135
- Died: 1166 (aged c. 31)
- Noble family: Barcelona
- Spouse: Richeza of Poland
- Issue: Douce II, Countess of Provence
- Father: Berenguer Ramon, Count of Provence
- Mother: Beatrice of Melgueil

Ramon Berenguer II (Raymond Berengar) (c. 1135–1166) was the count of Provence from 1144 to his death. His uncle, Ramon Berenguer IV, Count of Barcelona, was the regent until 1157.

== Life ==
Coat-of-arms of Provence.

Born in 1135, Ramon was the son of Berenguer Ramon, Count of Provence and Beatrice of Melgueil. In 1144, Ramon's father, Berenguer Ramon, died in an offensive against Genoa and he inherited the county. He was immediately opposed by the family of Baux and it took the military action of his uncle, the count of Barcelona, in 1147 to secure his throne. The war with the Baux continued until the count of Barcelona's death in 1162.

In August 1161, he had travelled to Turin with his uncle obtain the confirmation of his countship in Provence from the Emperor Frederick I, for Provence was legally a fief of the Holy Roman Empire. There he met Richeza of Poland, the daughter of the exiled Polish high duke, Ladislaus II and married her on 17 November.

Ramon resumed the war with Genoa, but was assassinated during the siege of Nice in 1166. His daughter, Douce II, succeeded him, while widow Richeza was betrothed to Raymond V of Toulouse.

== Sources ==
- Benito, Pere (2017). "An Intense but Symied Occitan Campaign". In Sabaté, Flocel (ed.). The Crown of Aragon: A Singular Mediterranean Empire. Brill. pp. 92–124. ISBN 978-90-04-34960-5.
- Busch, Silvia Orvietani (2001). Medieval Mediterranean Ports: The Catalan and Tuscan Coasts, 1100 to 1235. Brill.
- Graham-Leigh, Elaine (2005). The Southern French Nobility and the Albigensian Crusade. The Boydell Press.

Preceded by Berenguer Ramon I	Count of Provence; 1144–1166	Succeeded by Douce II
