= Rotbold II of Provence =

Count and Margrave of Provence from 1008 to his death in 1014 or 1015

Rotbold II, Count of Provence
- Died: 1014 or 1015
- Noble family: Bosonids
- Spouse: Ermengarde of Burgundy
- Issue: Hugh; William III; Emma
- Father: Rotbold I of Provence
- Mother: Emilde of Gévaudan

Rotbold II (also Rothbold, Rotbald, Rodbald, Roubaud, or Rotbaud) (died 1014 or 1015) was the Count and Margrave of Provence from 1008 to his death. He was the only son of Rotbold I and Emilde, daughter of Stephen, Viscount of Gévaudan. He inherited all his father's titles on his death in 1008. He is an obscure person, difficult to differentiate from his father.

== Family ==
Rotbald married Ermengarde of Burgundy. By her he left two sons and a daughter:

- Hugh
- William III of Provence
- Emma, who married William III Taillefer, Count of Toulouse, and thus brought the margravial title in Provence to the House of Rouergue.

His widow Ermengard married Rudolf III of Burgundy c. 1016 and she died c. 28 Aug. 1057.
