= Boso II of Arles =

Count of Arles (c. 928–965/67)

Boson II of Arles
- Count of Avignon; Count of Arles
- Born: c. 928
- Died: 967 (aged 38–39)
- Spouse: Constance
- Issue: Rotbold I of Provence; William I of Provence
- Father: Rotbald of Agel

Boson II of Arles (c. 928 – 965/67) was Count of Avignon from 935 and Count of Arles from 949. Around 953, Boso II married Constance, possibly a daughter of the Bivinid Charles Constantine, Count of Vienne, from whom he got two sons: Rotbold I (Roubaud), and William I (Guillaume the Liberator) (* c. 952; † 994), Count of Arles and Provence, and then Margrave of Provence. His origin is controversial, even though his life is relatively well known.

== Origin ==
According to a first hypothesis, Boson II, son of Rotbold (Roubaud) or Rodboald of Agel, a Mâconnais noble is given the title of Count of Provence in 903 by Louis the Blind.

The ancestors of Rotbold are unknown. Some historians consider that he could be the husband of either Ermengard, a daughter of William I, Duke of Aquitaine and Engelberga of Provence, or her maternal aunt Ermengard, one of the daughters of Boso V of Provence and Ermengard of Italy. This hypothesis is based on the fact that his ancestor being a male descendant of the Margrave Boso is rejected by some historians due to this Boson only having female descendants. According to the French historian Jean-Pierre Poly, who sides with this hypothesis, the family of counts who was put into power by Hugh of Italy, probably came from Septimania. One of them, Boson, switched sides around 947-948 by cancelling his marriage with Berthe, the niece of Hugh, and marrying a noblewoman named Constance. His brother William's name was given to one of Boson's sons and suggests he was possibly related to the Guilhelmides of Auvergne. Conrad III of Burgundy, the new king of Provence, may have found in Boson a less threatening and ambitious count from a minor family, and more likely to get along with Provençal notables.
