= Fulk Bertrand of Provence =

Count of Provence

Fulk Bertrand I (died 27 April 1051) was the joint Count of Provence with his elder brother William IV from 1018 and with his younger brother Geoffrey I from at least 1032 if not earlier. After William's death, Fulk assumed the title of margrave, indicating headship of the dynasty. They were the sons of William II, count of Provence. Provence was during this time part of the Kingdom of Arles, and in 1033 also became part of the Holy Roman Empire.

With Geoffrey, Fulk made a donation to the Abbey of Cluny on 26 May 1037 and to Saint Victor at Marseille on 16 January 1040. Fulk Bertrand was a major proponent of the renewed monasticism of early eleventh-century Provence. He called together a council of clergy and noblesse to found the abbey of Saint Promasius near Forcalquier and to restore Bremetense near Gap, which had been destroyed by the Saracens of Fraxinetum.

He and his brother gave up control of much of the royal fisc, which had been under the control of the counts of Provence since the time of William the Liberator. It was mostly parcelled out as allods to vassals and the weakening of the county of Provence as a united polity can be dated from their reign.

Despite the generosity of him and his brother to Fulk, viscount of Marseilles, Fulk Bertrand made war on him in 1031, damaging Toulon.

== Family ==
He married Hildegard and they had two sons, William Bertrand and Geoffrey II, plus one daughter, Gerberge.

== Sources ==
- Lewis, Archibald R. The Development of Southern French and Catalan Society, 718–1050. University of Texas Press: Austin, 1965.
- The Plantagenet Ancestry by William Henry Turton, Page 11.
