= Ermessende of Pelet =

Ermessende of Pelet was the last heiress of the County of Melgueil, in southern France, and the last countess before it was joined with the County of Toulouse.

Ermessende was the daughter of Bernard V Pelet, who had married Beatrice, daughter of Bernard IV of Melgueil and widow of Berenguer Ramon, Count of Provence. As her consort Bernard V ruled the county from 1146 to 1170.

Ermessende first married Pierre Bermond, lord of Anduze, and they ruled Melgueil from 1170 to 1172 when he died. In 1173 she married Raymond VI of Toulouse. Ermessende died in 1176; her will, made shortly before, was heard before the cardinal deacon Raymond des Arènes, Aldebert d'Uzès, bishop of Nîmes, Bernard Ato V, viscount of Nîmes and Agde, and Gui Guerrejat, guardian of William VIII of Montpellier.

Raymond VI continued to rule Melgueil from 1176 until 1190, though he lived until 1222.
