= Bernard V of Melgueil =

Bernard V (died 1172), son of Raymond Pilet d’Alès and his wife Mabel, of an unknown family, was Count of Meigueil, by right of his wife (jure uxoris), and Seigneur of Alès (as Bernard II d’Alès). Bernard became Count of Meigueil upon his marriage to Beatrix de Melgueil, in 1146. One source claims Bernard was in the First Crusade, but there is no evidence that this was the case.

Beatrix (1130-1190), also known as Beatrice, was the only child of Bernard IV, Count of Melgueil (d. 1132), and Guillemette de Montpellier (daughter of William V, Lord of Montpellier). Bernard IV inherited the countship from his father Raymond II, representing a lineage of Counts of Melgueil dating to 930. Beatrix became Countess of Melgueil in 1130 upon her father’s death. Because of her young age, William VI of Montpellier, the son of William V, was named regent of the county and remained so until Beatrix married her first husband Berengar Raymond, Count of Provence. Upon his death in 1144, Beatrix ruled the county.

Beatrix then married Bernard II d’Alès, who became Bernard V, Count of Meigueil. Beatrix and Bernard had two children:

- Bertrand Pilet (d. 1191 or after)
- Ermessende of Pilet (d. 1176).

This is where things become complicated in the ruling of the County of Meigueil. Bertrand was disinherited by his mother and unsuccessfully fought the arrangements made with the Counts of Toulouse by his sister. He swore homage to King Alfonso II of Aragon to help contest these arrangements to no avail.

Bertrand married a woman named Bonafosse (d. 1205) of an unknown family and had one child Raymond (d. 1129). Raymond swore allegiance to his brother-in-law Raymond VI, Count of Toulouse, undoubtedly to help regain his inheritance. He married Sibylle d’Anduze, daughter of Bernard VII, Seigneur d’Anduze.

Ermenssende of Pilet married first Pierre Bermond IV, Seigneur of Sauve and Sommières. Her second marriage was to Raymond VI, Count of Toulouse, son of Raymond V of Toulouse and Constance of France, daughter of Louis VI of France. The counts of Toulouse ruled Melgueil until 1211 when Pope Innocent III enfeoffed it to Guillaume d'Autignac, Bishop of Maguelone.

== Sources ==
- Devic, Claude, and Vaissète, Joseph, Histoire générale de Languedoc : Volume I, Toulouse, édition Privat, 1872
- Emmerson, Richard K., Key Figures in Medieval Europe: An Encyclopedia, Routledge Publishing, New York, 2013
- Riley-Smith, Jonathan, The First Crusaders, 1095-1131, Cambridge University Press, London, 1997
