= Emma of Provence =

- Born: c. 1007
- Died: 1062
- Noble family: Bosonids
- Spouse: William III of Toulouse
- Issue: Pons, Count of Toulouse; Bertrand
- Father: Rotbold II of Provence
- Mother: Ermengarde of Burgundy

Emma (c. 1007–1062) was the margravine of Provence from 1037 until 1062.

She was the daughter of Rotbold II of Provence and Ermengarde of Burgundy. She inherited the title from her brother William III, and married William III of Toulouse.

With William, she had two children:

- Pons, who succeeded to Toulouse
- Bertrand, who succeeded Pons in Toulouse (1060) and his mother in Provence

== Sources ==
- Lewis, Archibald R. The Development of Southern French and Catalan Society, 718–1050. University of Texas Press: Austin, 1965.

Emma of Provence Bosonids Born: 1014 Died: 1062
Preceded by William III	Margrave of Provence; 1037-1062	Succeeded by Bertrand
