= William Bertrand of Provence =

French count and margrave of Provence (died 1094)

William Bertrand, otherwise William V (died 28 July 1094), (Note: Elaine Graham-Leigh calls him Bertrand II.) was the count and margrave of Provence from 1051 to his death. He succeeded his father Fulk Bertrand on his death in that year, but did not receive the margravial title at first, for it went to his uncle Josfred.

William Bertrand co-ruled for his entire life with his uncle and cousins, though he received the margravial rank upon his uncle's death in 1062. In 1081, he choose the side of the Papacy in the investiture controversy. When William Bertrand died, the margraviate was inherited by Raymond IV of Toulouse.

William Bertrand's daughter, Adelaide, inherited Forcalquier from her uncle, Geoffrey II of Provence.

== Marriages ==
William Bertrand married Theresa, daughter of Ramiro I of Aragon

William Bertrand secondly married Adelaid of Cavenez. They had:

- Cecil, married Bernard Aton of Béziers
- Adelaide, married Ermengol IV, Count of Urgell

== Sources ==
- Graham-Leigh, Elaine (2005). The Southern French Nobility and the Albigensian Crusade. Boydell Press.
- Nelson, Lynn H., ed. (1991). The Chronicle of San Juan de la Peña: A Fourteenth-century Official History of the Crown of Aragon. University of Pennsylvania Press.
