= Richeza of Poland, Queen of Castile =

Queen of Castile and León from 1152 to 1157

Richeza of Poland
- Coat of arms of Richeza of Poland, queen consort of León

Queen consort of León, Castile, and Galica
- Tenure: 1152–1157
- Born: c. 1140; Poland
- Died: 16 June 1185 (aged 44–45); Germany
- Spouse: Alfonso VII of León and Castile (m. 1152; died 1157) Ramon Berenguer II, Count of Provence; Albert III, Count of Eberstein
- Issue: Infante Ferdinand of Castile; Sancha of Castile, Queen of Aragon; Douce II, Countess of Provence; Albert IV, Count of Everstein; Konrad II, Count of Everstein
- House: Silesian Piasts
- Father: Władysław II the Exile
- Mother: Agnes of Babenberg

Richeza of Poland (also known as Richeza of Silesia; Polish: Ryksa śląska, Spanish: Richeza de Silesia; c. 1140 – 16 June 1185) was a Polish princess of the House of Piast in the Silesian branch. By her marriages, she was Queen consort of Galicia, León and Castile, Countess of Provence, and Countess of Eberstein.

Richeza was the third child and only daughter of Władysław II the Exile, the High Duke of Poland and ruler of Silesia, and Agnes of Babenberg, daughter of Margrave Leopold III of Austria and half-sister of King Conrad III of Germany.

== Life ==
=== Queen of Castile, León and Galicia ===
Born and raised for the first years of her life in Poland, Richeza accompanied her parents and brothers into exile in 1146. They established themselves first in Bohemia and later in Germany under the care of King Conrad III, who gave his deposed brother-in-law the Saxon district of Altenburg as his residence.

In 1151 came the news that the King Alfonso VII of León and Castile wanted to make an alliance with the Kingdom of Germany through a wedding. Richeza, niece of King Conrad III, was the most attractive candidate available. Richeza and King Alfonso VII married between October and December 1152. Her first child, Ferdinand, was born in the city of Toledo one year later, in 1153. Two years later, in 1155, Richeza gave birth to her second child, Sancha. King Alfonso VII died suddenly in the middle of the war against the Moors in Sierra Morena on 21 August 1157. Apparently, Infante Ferdinand died shortly before his father.

=== Countess of Provence ===
The late king divided his domains between his two surviving sons born from his first marriage to Berenguela of Barcelona: Sancho III obtained Castile and Ferdinand II received León. The relationship between Richeza and her stepsons was not good, especially after King Sancho III declared war on Ramon Berenguer IV, Count of Barcelona, father of Alfonso (later King of Aragon), who was betrothed to Richeza's daughter Sancha. The unstable relations of King Ferdinand II with the Holy Roman Emperor Frederick Barbarossa (cousin of Richeza) and the Antipope Victor IV added further difficulties to the Dowager Queen, who finally decided to move to the Kingdom of Aragon in 1159.

At the court of Aragon, Richeza met Ramon Berenguer II, Count of Provence, nephew of Count of Barcelona. A marriage between them was quickly considered; this wouldn't be a union for love, but clearly a political one. Ramon Berenguer II supported Victor IV against Pope Alexander III, who, in turn, supported King Louis VII of France. The county of Provence was in a strategic location, between France and the Italian Peninsula. Frederick Barbarossa also wanted to win to his side Count Ramon Berenguer IV, who entered in an alliance with the kings of France, Castile and León. In contrast, Ramon Berenguer II, soon cousin by marriage of the Emperor, gained prestige and could face the pretensions of the lord of Les Baux, Hugh II, who had just received the Imperial Provence as a fief.

Premarital negotiations lasted almost a year and a half. Richeza and Count Ramon Berenguer II were finally married between January and October 1161. They had only one daughter, Douce of Provence, born about 1162. Ramon Berenguer II was killed during the siege of Nice in 1166.

Soon after her second husband's death, plans for a new marriage for Richeza began. Apparently, she was betrothed to Raymond V, Count of Toulouse, by her cousin the Emperor Frederick Barbarossa around 1166; at the same time, the now Countess Douce II of Provence was engaged to the future Raymond VI. Count Raymond V wanted with this engagement to become more closely tied to the Hohenstaufen dynasty and took full control over the County of Provence. However, the firm opposition of King Alfonso II of Aragon (Richeza's future son-in-law) soon cancelled both betrothals, and with the help of the Genoese, he began a war against Raymond V that lasted eight years.

Some sources stated that in fact Richeza and Raymond V were married, however this event is refuted by the majority of modern historians.

=== Countess of Eberstein ===
By 1167, Richeza married her third and last husband, Count Albert III of Eberstein, who fought at the side of Frederick Barbarossa in his wars against the Guelphs. She moved to Germany with her new husband. From this union were born two sons, Counts Albert IV and Konrad II of Eberstein.

Little is known about the later life of Richeza. She died on 16 June 1185.

== Sources ==
- Commire, Anne; Klezmer, Deborah, eds. (2001). "Richizza of Poland (1116-1185)". Women in World History: A Biographical Encyclopedia. Vol. 13:R-Schr. Yorkin Publications.
- Reilly, Bernard F. (1998). The Kingdom of León-Castilla Under King Alfonso VII, 1126 – 1157. Philadelphia: University of Pennsylvania Press. ISBN 9780812234527.
- Sabaté, Flocel, ed. (2017). The Crown of Aragon: A Singular Mediterranean Empire. Brill.

Richeza of Poland, Queen of Castile House of Piast Born: c. 1140 Died: 16 June 1185
Royal titles
Preceded by Berengaria of Barcelona	Queen consort of León and Galicia; 1152–1157	Succeeded by Urraca of Portugal
Preceded by Berengaria of Barcelona	Queen consort of Castile; 1152–1157	Succeeded by Eleanor of England
