= Adelaide-Blanche of Anjou =

Frankish noblewoman (945–1026)

- Born: c. 940; West Francia
- Died: 1026; Avignon, France
- Burial: Montmajour Abbey
- Spouses: Stephen, Viscount of Gévaudan (m. 955; died 970); Raymond III, Count of Toulouse (m. 975; died 978); Louis V, King of France (m. 982; ann. 984); William I, Count of Provence (m. 984; died 993)
- Issue: With Stephen; William; Pons; Bertrand of Gévaudan; Almondis of Gévaudan; Philippa of Gévaudan; With Raymond; William III, Count of Toulouse; With William; William II, Count of Provence; Constance of Arles; Ermengarde of Arles; Tota-Adelaide of Arles
- House: Ingelger
- Father: Fulk II, Count of Anjou
- Mother: Gerberga

Adelaide-Blanche of Anjou (Note: The majority of historians refer to her as Adelaide, for example see Stasser (1997). Bernard Bachrach refers to her as Adelaide-Blanche throughout his book Fulk Nerra (1993), and in his article 'Henry II and the Angevin Tradition', Albion, 16, 2, (1984), p. 117 n. 35 in writing of Ermengarde-Gerberga of Anjou states that Angevins were known to give daughters two names, giving her aunt Adelaide-Blanche (the subject of this article) as an example, without explaining that his novel theory has no contemporary documentation. Constance Bouchard, in Those of My Blood (2001) consistently refers to her as Adelaide-Blanche, parroting Bachrach. At least two chronicles, the Chronicle S. Albin and the Chronicle S. Maxent. call her Blanche, See: Norgate, Eng. Under the Angevin Kings, Vol. 1 (1887), p. 191. In the work Rodulfi Glabri Historiarum libri quinque, Ed. & Trans. John France (2002), on pp. 16–17 n. 5 she is referred to as "Adelaide, also called Blanche" while on pp. 106–7 n. 5 she is called "Adelaide-Blanche." Also see the reference to the letter by pope Benedict VIII addressing her as Countess Adelaide, "cognomento Blanche" in the note below. The name Adelaide-Blanche has clearly become the preferred version of her name among a subset of modern historians. Nevertheless Adelaide-Blanche was not her contemporary name; her given name was Adelaide and the "pet" name/nickname used by her closest family and friends was Blanche. At the height of her political power, she is explicitly named as the still living 'Adelaix' in a 992 charter of her son William III and his wife Emma.) (c. 940 –1026) was, by her successive marriages, countess of Gévaudan and Forez, of Toulouse, of Provence, and of Burgundy, and queen of Aquitaine. She was the regent of Gevaudan during the minority of her sons in the 960s, and the regent of Provence during the minority of her son from 994 until 999.

== Life ==
She was the daughter of Count Fulk II of Anjou and Gerberga, and sister of Geoffrey Greymantle. She successfully increased Angevin fortunes, being married a total of five times. Her family had become upwardly mobile to the point that, as a member of just the third generation from Ingelger, Adelaide-Blanche had married into the highest ranks of the older nobility of western Francia.

Her first marriage was to Stephen, the powerful count of Gévaudan and Forez in eastern Aquitaine. She was no more than fifteen at the time and he was much older. Still, they had three children who survived to adulthood. Stephen died in 970 and after his death she ruled the lands as regent for her sons William, Pons and Bertrand. She continued to govern Gevaudan and Forez while her remaining two sons learned to rule their father's counties. Additionally, after her oldest son William's death in 975 she raised his infant son Stephen. Her brother Guy was made count-bishop of Le Puy in 975 amidst local opposition and at his request Adelaide, acting for her sons Guy and Bertrand, led an army to aid him in establishing the "Peace of God" in le Puy.

In 982, as the widow of her second husband, Count Raymond III of Toulouse, she wed Louis, son of King Lothair of France. The two were crowned king and queen of Aquitaine at Brioude by her brother Guy. The marriage lasted just over a year due to the couple being unable to peacefully live together. There was also a significant age difference—he being fifteen and Adelaide-Blanche being over forty. Adelaide found herself in a precarious situation with King Lothair, but was rescued by Count William I of Provence, (Note: Rodulfus Glaber had a somewhat different version. That Lothar's son Louis was wed to a woman from Aquitaine (Adelaide also called Blanche), and she wanting a separation and being a clever woman lured her young husband to Aquitaine where she deserted him and returned to her own family; that it was Louis who was rescued by his father king Lothar. See: Rodulfi Glabri Historiarum libri quinque, Ed. & Trans. John France (2002), on pp. 16–17 & n. 5.) whom she subsequently married c. 984. Count William died in 994 shortly after becoming a monk at Avignon.

In 1010 King Robert II of France, along with Count Odo II of Blois, went to Rome to secure an annulment from Robert's second wife, Constance of Arles, Adelaide-Blanche's daughter by William I. Pope Sergius IV, a friend to the Angevin counts, upheld the marriage and additionally upheld Adelaide's struggle to maintain control of lands at Montmajour Abbey. These lands at Perth had been donated by Count William I of Provence with his wife Adelaide-Blanche, as well as by a previous donation by William's father, Boson. A dispute over these lands arose by four brothers, sons of Nevolongus, who Pope Sergius threatened with excommunication if they did not withdraw their claim. The claim was withdrawn and the lands remained under the control of Adelaide-Blanche acting as regent for her son William II of Provence.

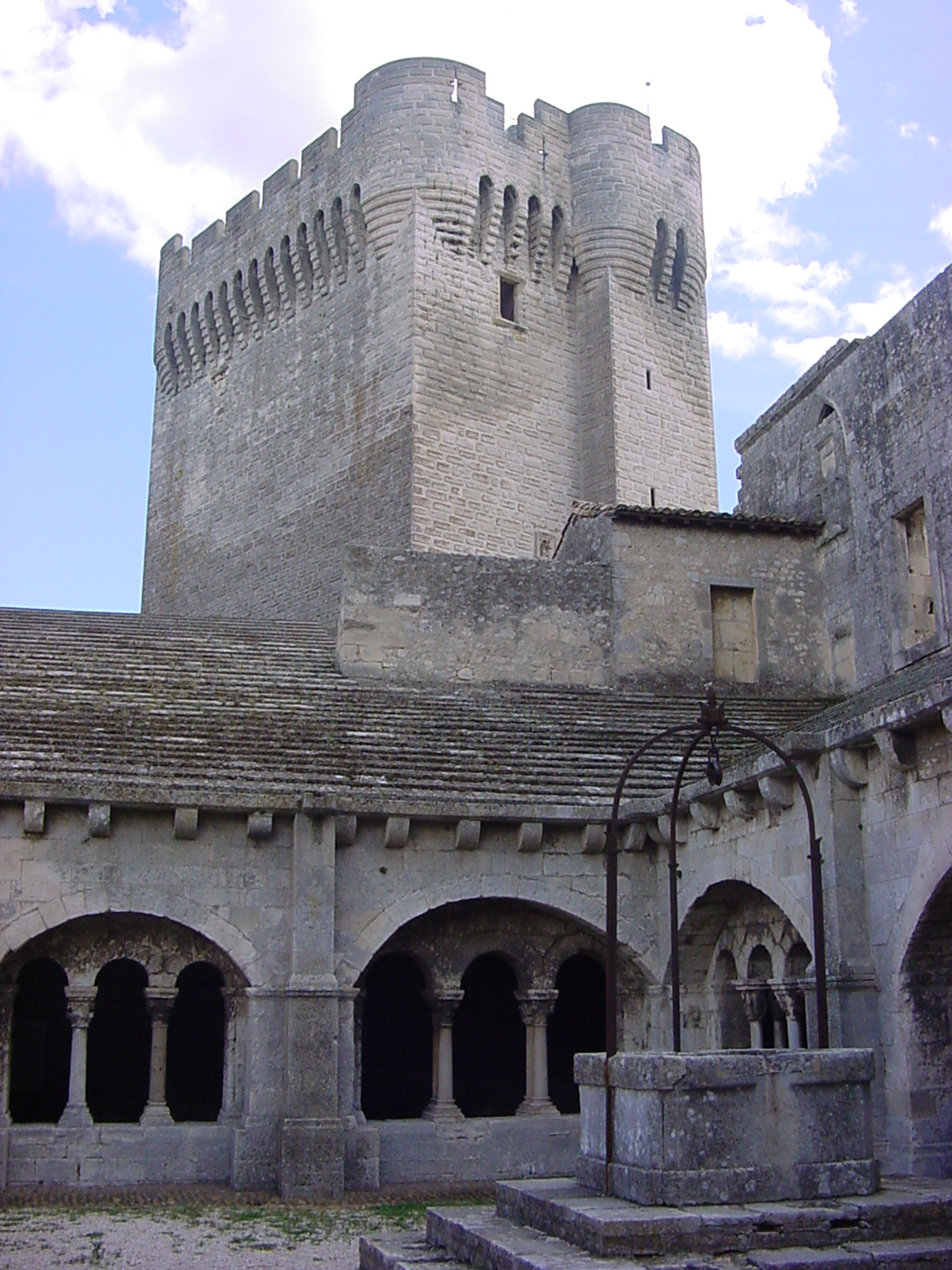
The cloister of Montmajour Abbey her final resting place.

It has been suggested that she married a fifth time, to Count Otto-William of Burgundy, whose second wife was named Adelaide. However, it is disputed whether his wife Adelaide was the same as Adelaide-Blanche.

Adelaide-Blanche died in 1026, aged approximately eighty-six. The location of her death was probably at Avignon, since the year of her death is recorded by Arnoux, a monk of the abbey of Saint-André, near Avignon. She was buried in Montmajour Abbey, near Arles, considered at the time as the burial place of the family of counts of Provence.

== Marriages and children ==
Adelaide-Blanche married first, c. 955, Stephen, Viscount of Gévaudan (d. 970). Children of this marriage were:

- William (c. 955–975)
- Pons, Count of Gévaudan and Forez, died after 26 February 1011.
- Bertrand, Count of Gévaudan.
- Almodis of Gévaudan; married Adalbert I de Charroux, Count de la Haute March.
- Philippa of Gévaudan; married William V of Auvergne; possibly named Bertha

Adelaide-Blanche's second marriage was to Raymond III, Count of Toulouse and Prince of Gothia, in 975. He died in 978. She had by him at least one child:

- William III, Count of Toulouse

Adelaide-Blanche married, as her third husband, Louis V of France. The two were crowned King and Queen of Aquitaine, but the marriage ended in annulment.

Adelaide-Blanche's fourth husband c. 984 was William I of Provence. Together they had:

- William II of Provence, married Gerberge, daughter of Otto-William, Count of Burgundy
- Constance of Arles, who later married Robert II of France
- Ermengarde of Arles, who married Robert I, Count of Auvergne.
- Tota-Adelaide of Arles, who married Bernard I, Count of Besalú.

== Sources ==
- Bachrach, Bernard S. (1978). "The Idea of the Angevin Empire". Albion: A Quarterly Journal Concerned with British Studies. 10 (4 (Winter)). The North American Conference on British Studies.
- Bachrach, Bernard S. (1993). Fulk Nerra the Neo-Roman Consul, 987-1040. University of California Press.
- Bouchard, Constance Brittain (1999). "Burgundy and Provence, 879-1032". In Reuter, Timothy (ed.). The New Cambridge Medieval History. Vol. III: c.900 -c.1024. Cambridge University Press.
- Bouchard, Constance Brittain (2001). Those of My Blood: Creating Noble Families in Medieval Francia. University of Pennsylvania Press.
- Bouchard, Constance Brittain (2006). "The kingdom of the Franks to 1108". In Abulafia, David; Allmand, C. T. (eds.). The New Cambridge Medieval History. Vol. 4, c.1024 – c.1198, Part 2. Cambridge University Press. p. 120-153.
- Crisp, Ryan Patrick (2005). "Consanguinity and the Saint Aubin Genealogies". In Morillo, Stephen (ed.). The Haskins Society Journal 14: 2003. Studies in Medieval History. Vol. 14. The Boydell Press. pp. 105–116.
- Glaber, Rodulfus (1989). France, John (ed.). The Five Books of the Histories. The Clarendon Press.
- Gras, Samuel; Legaré, Anne-Marie, eds. (2021). Lumières du Nord: Les manuscrits enluminés français et flamands de la Bibliotheque nationale d'Espagne. Presses Universitie Septentrio.
- Kroll, Jerome; Bachrach, Bernard S. (1990). "Medieval Dynastic Decisions: Evolutionary Biology and Historical Explanation". The Journal of Interdisciplinary History. 21 (1 (Summer)). The MIT Press.
- Settipani, Christian (2004). La Noblesse du Midi Carolingien. Prosopographia et Genealogica 5.
- Settipani, Christian (1993). La Préhistoire des Capétiens. Patrick van Kerrebrouck.
