= William I of Provence =

Count of Provence (c. 950–993)

William I (c. 950 – after 29 August 993), called the Liberator, was Count of Provence from 968 to his abdication. In 975 or 979, he took the title of marchio or margrave. He is often considered the founder of the county of Provence. He and his elder brother Rotbold I were sons of Boson II of Arles and his wife Constance, who, based on her name, has been speculated to be daughter of Charles Constantine of Vienne. They both carried the title of comes or count concurrently, but it is unknown if they were joint-counts of the whole of Provence or if the region was divided. His brother never bore any other title than count so long as William lived, so the latter seems to have attained a certain supremacy.

In 980, he was installed as Count of Arles. His sobriquet comes from his victories against the Saracens by which he liberated Provence from their threat, which had been constant since the establishment of a base at Fraxinet. At the Battle of Tourtour in 973, with the assistance of the counts of the High Alps and the viscounts of Marseille and Fos, he definitively routed the Saracens, chasing them forever from Provence. He reorganised the region east of the Rhône, which he conquered from the Saracens and which had been given him as a gift from King Conrad of Burgundy. Also by royal consent, he and his descendants controlled the fisc in Provence. With Isarn, Bishop of Grenoble, he repopulated Dauphiné and settled an Italian count named Ugo Blavia near Fréjus in 970 in order to bring that land back to cultivation. For all this, he figures prominently in Ralph Glaber's chronicle with the title of dux and he appears in a charter of 992 as pater patriae.

He donated land to Cluny and retired to become a monk, dying at Avignon, where he was buried in the church of Saint-Croix at Sarrians. He was succeeded as margrave by his brother. His great principality began to diminish soon after his death as the castles of his vassals, which he had kept carefully under ducal control, soon became allods of their possessors.

== Marriages and issue ==
He married, firstly, Arsinde, daughter of Arnaud I de Carcassonne. They had no children.

He married, secondly (against papal advice), in 984, Adelaide-Blanche of Anjou, daughter of Fulk II of Anjou and Gerberga, and their children were:

- Constance of Arles (986–1034), married Robert II of France.
- William II (or III) of Provence.
- Ermengarde, she married Robert I, Count of Auvergne.
- Tota-Adelaide, she married Bernard I, Count of Besalú.

== See also ==
- Tour Grimaldi
