= William III of Toulouse =

William III, Count of Toulouse
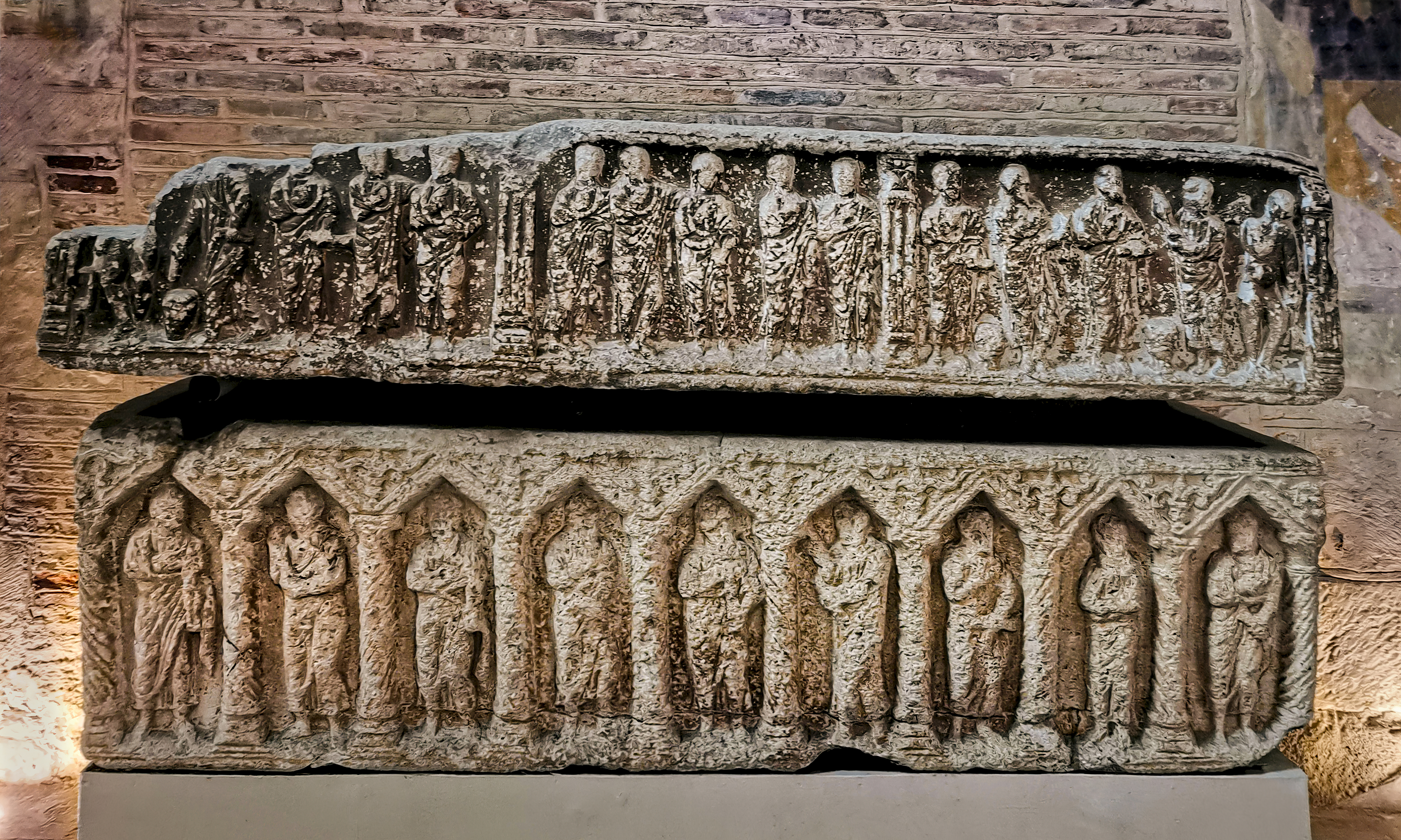
- Sarcophagus of William in the Basilica of Saint-Sernin.
- Born: c. 970
- Died: September 1037
- Noble family: House of Rouergue
- Spouse: Emma of Provence
- Issue: Pons, Count of Toulouse; Bertrand
- Father: Raymond, Count of Toulouse
- Mother: Adelais of Anjou

William III Taillefer (also spelled Tallefer or Tallifer; c. 970 – September 1037) was the Count of Toulouse, Albi, and Quercy, as well as the Marquis of Gothie from 972 or 978 to his death. He was the first of the Toulousain branch of his family to bear the title marchio, which he inherited (c. 975) from Raymond II of Rouergue.

His parentage has been subject to reevaluation. He has traditionally been called son of Raymond III Pons and Garsinda. However, recent research has revealed that William was instead the son of Adelais of Anjou, known to have married a Raymond, "Prince of Gothia". This discovery has required a complete reevaluation of the succession to the County of Toulouse during this period, and no new scholarly consensus has emerged.

He and his vassals were notorious usurpers of church property. He stole from the abbey of Lézat, but gave it back between 1015 and 1025. Pope John XIX ordered him to stop his vassals from taking the lands of Moissac, a problem later remedied by his successor, Pons, who gave Moissac to Cluny.

William became the most powerful prince in western Languedoc and he saw the rise of the House of Capet in France and a corresponding decrease in royal authority recognised in the south. He bore the title of marchio prefatus in pago Tholosano: "prefect margrave in the Toulousain country." His influence extended into the Narbonensis and even Provence, on behalf of his wife. His power did not remain undiminished in his own city of Toulouse, where he was forced by a council of local noblemen and clerics to give up dues imposed on the market there.

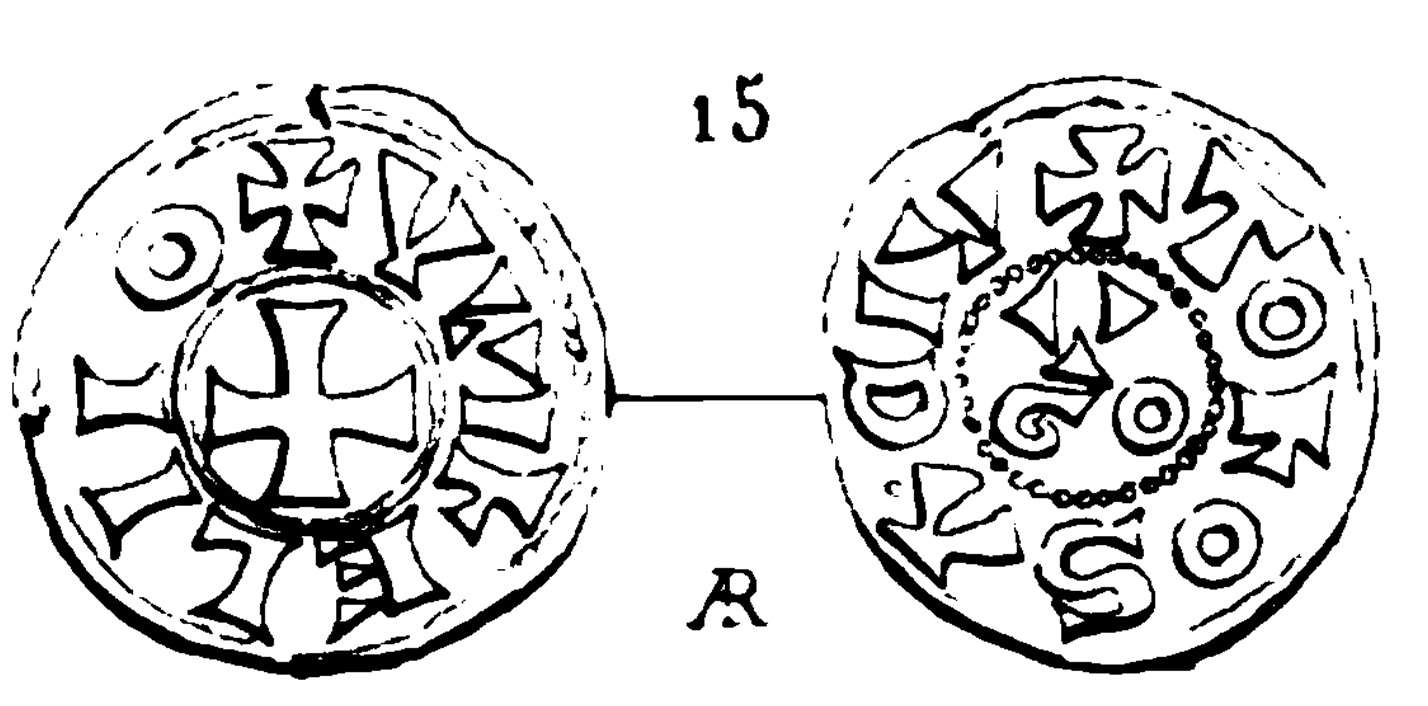
Coin of William III Taillefer, count of Toulouse.

William married twice, first to Arsinde, and second to Emma, daughter of Rotbold III of Provence. From her he gained titles and lands to Provence. From Arsinde, he had two sons, Raymond and Hugh, who died young. His eldest son by Emma, Pons, inherited Toulouse and the title of Margrave of Provence. His second son Bertrand became Count of Forcalquier, a Provençal fief. He had an illegitimate daughter who married Otto Raymond of L'Isle-Jourdain.

== Sources ==
- Thierry Stasser, "Adélaïde d'Anjou. Sa famille, ses mariages, sa descendance", Le Moyen Age 103,1 (1997): 9–52

William III of Toulouse House of Rouergue Born: c. 970 Died: September 1037
Preceded by Raymond	Count of Toulouse; 978–1037	Succeeded by Pons
