= List of state leaders in the 11th century =

This is a list of state leaders in the 11th century (1001–1100) AD, except for the many leaders within the Holy Roman Empire.

== Africa ==
=== Africa: Central ===
Chad

- Kanem Empire (Kanem–Bornu) (complete list) –

- Hume, Mai (1068–1080)
- Dunama I, Mai (1080–1133)

=== Africa: East ===
Ethiopia

- Zagwe dynasty of Ethiopia (complete list) –

- Jan Seyum, Negus (11th century)
- Germa Seyum, Negus (11th century)
- Yemrehana Krestos, Negus (11th century)
- Kedus Harbe, Negus (c.1079–c.1119)

=== Africa: Northeast ===
Egypt

- Fatimid Caliphate (complete list) –

- al-Hakim bi-Amr Allah, Caliph (996–1021)
- ali az-Zahir, Caliph (1021–1036)
- al-Mustansir Billah, Caliph (1036–1094)
- al-Musta'li, Caliph (1094–1101)

Sudan

- Makuria (complete list) –

- Georgios II, King (969–c.1002)
- Raphael, King (1000–c.1006)
- Stephanos, King (c.1027)
- Solomon, King (1077–1079/80)
- Georgios III, King (c.1079/80)
- Basileios, King (c.1089)

=== Africa: Northcentral ===
Ifriqiya

- Zirid dynasty (complete list) –

- Badis ibn Mansur, ruler (995–1016)
- al-Muizz ibn Badis, ruler (1016–1062)
- Tamim ibn al-Mu'izz, ruler (1062–1108)

=== Africa: Northwest ===
Morocco

- Almoravid dynasty (complete list) –

- Abu Bakr ibn Umar, chieftain of the Lamtuna tribe (c.1060–1072)
- Yusuf ibn Tashfin, Sultan of Morocco (1072–1106)

=== Africa: West ===
Nigeria

- Kingdom of Kano (complete list) –

- Bagauda, King (999–1063)
- Warisi dan Bagauda, King (1063–1095)
- Gijimasu dan Warisi, King (1095–1134)

- Kingdom of Nri (complete list) –

- Eri, King (948–1041)
- Eze Nri Ìfikuánim, King (1043–1089)
- Eze Nri Nàmóke, King (1090–1158)

== Asia ==
=== Asia: Central ===
Afghanistan

- Ghaznavid dynasty (complete list) –

- Mahmud, Emir (998–1002), Sultan (1002–1030)
- Muhammad, Sultan (1030–1030, 1040–1041)
- Mas'ud I, Sultan (1030–1040)
- Maw'dud, Sultan (1041–1048)
- Mas'ud II, Sultan (1048)
- Ali, Sultan (1048–1049)
- Abd al-Rashid, Sultan (1049–1052)
- Toghrul, Sultan (1052–1053)
- Farrukh-Zad, Sultan (1053–1059)
- Ibrahim, Sultan (1059–1099)
- Mas'ud III, Sultan (1099–1115)

Mongolia

- Khamag Mongol (complete list) –

- Khaidu, ruler (?–c.1100)

Tibet

- Guge

- Lha lde, King (996–1024)
- Nagaraja, ruler (?–1023)
- Devaraja, ruler (?–1026)
- 'Od lde btsan, King (1024–1037)
- Byang chub 'Od, King (1037–1057)
- Che chen tsha rTse lde, King (1057–1088)
- Bar lde (dBang lde), King (1088–c.1095)
- bSod nams rtse, King (c.1095–early 12th century)

Uzbekistan

- Samanid Empire (complete list) –

- Isma'il Muntasir, Amir (1000–1004)

=== Asia: East ===
Khitan China: Liao dynasty

- Liao dynasty (complete list) –

- Shengzong, Emperor (982–1031)
- Xingzong, Emperor (1031–1055)
- Daozong, Emperor (1055–1101)

China: Northern Song

- Song dynasty (complete list) –

- Zhenzong, Emperor (997–1022)
- Renzong, Emperor (1022–1063)
- Yingzong, Emperor (1063–1067)
- Shenzong, Emperor (1067–1085)
- Zhezong, Emperor (1085–1100)
- Huizong, Emperor (1100–1125)

China: Other states and entities

- Dingnan Jiedushi (complete list) –

- Li Jiqian, Jiedushi (998–1004)
- Li Deming, Jiedushi (1004–1031)

- Dali Kingdom (complete list) –

- Duan Suying, Emperor (985–1009)
- Duan Sulian, Emperor (1009–1022)
- Duan Sulong, Emperor (1022–1026)
- Duan Suzhen, Emperor (1026–1041)
- Duan Suxing, Emperor (1041–1044)
- Duan Silian, Emperor (1044–1075)
- Duan Lianyi, Emperor (1075–1080)
- Duan Shouhui, Emperor (1080–1081)
- Duan Zhengming, Emperor (1081–1094)
- Gao Shengtai, Emperor (1094–1096)
- Duan Zhengchun, Emperor (1096–1108)

- Western Xia –

- Jǐngzōng, Emperor (1038–1048)
- Yìzōng, Emperor (1048–1067)
- Huìzōng, Emperor (1067–1086)
- Chóngzōng, Emperor (1086–1139)

Japan

- Heian period Japan (complete list) –

- Ichijō, Emperor (986–1011)
- Sanjō, Emperor (1011–1016)
- Go-Ichijō, Emperor (1016–1036)
- Go-Suzaku, Emperor (1036–1045)
- Go-Reizei, Emperor (1045–1068)
- Go-Sanjō, Emperor (1068–1073)
- Shirakawa, Emperor (1073–1087)
- Horikawa, Emperor (1087–1107)

Korea

- Goryeo (complete list) –

- Mokjong, King (997–1009)
- Hyeonjong, King (1009–1031)
- Deokjong, King (1031–1034)
- Heonjong, King (1094–1095)
- Sukjong, King (1095–1105)

=== Asia: Southeast ===
Cambodia

- Khmer Empire (complete list) –

- Jayavarman V, King (968–1001)
- Udayadityavarman I, King (1002)
- Jayavirahvarman, King (1002–1006)
- Suryavarman I, King (1006–1050)
- Udayadityavarman II, King (1050–1066)
- Harshavarman III, King (1066–1080)
- Jayavarman VI, King (1080–1107)
- Nripatindravarman, King (1080–1113)

Indonesia

Indonesia: Java

- Mataram kingdom: Isyana dynasty (complete list) –

- Dharmawangsa, King (991–1016)

- Sunda Kingdom (complete list) –

- Prabu Brajawisesa, Maharaja (989–1012)
- Prabu Dewa Sanghyang, Maharaja (1012–1019)
- Prabu Sanghyang Ageng, Maharaja (1019–1030)
- Prabu Detya Maharaja Sri Jayabupati, Maharaja (1030–1042)
- Dharmaraja, Maharaja (1042–1064)
- Prabu Langlangbhumi, Maharaja (1064–1154)

- Kahuripan –

- Airlangga, Raja (1019–1045)

Indonesia: Sumatra

- Srivijaya –

Shailendra dynasty
- Sri Maravijayottungga, King (c.1008)
- Sumatrabhumi, King (c.1017)
- Sangrama Vijayatunggavarman, King (c.1025)
Palembang
- Sri Deva, King (c.1028)
- Kulothunga Chola I, King (c.1078)

Indonesia: Lesser Sunda Islands

- Bali Kingdom: Warmadewa dynasty (complete list) –

- Udayana Warmadewa, King (fl.989–1011)
- Śri Ajñadewi, Queen (fl.1016)
- Dharmawangsa Wardhana Marakatapangkaja, King (fl.1022–1025)
- Airlangga, King (c.1025–1042)
- Anak Wungsu, King (fl.1049–1077)
- Śri Maharaja Walaprabhu, King (between 1079–1088)
- Śri Maharaja Sakalendukirana Laksmidhara Wijayottunggadewi, Queen (fl.1088–1101)

Malaysia: Peninsular

- Kedah Sultanate (complete list) –

- Durbar II, Raja (c.956–1136)

Myanmar / Burma

- Early Pagan Kingdom/ Pagan kingdom (complete list) –

- Kunhsaw Kyaunghpyu, King (early 11th century)
- Kyiso, King (early 11th century)
- Sokkate, King (early 11th century)
- Anawrahta, King (1044–1077)
- Saw Lu, King (1077–1084)
- Kyansittha, King (1084–1112/13)

- Thaton kingdom (complete list) –

- Udinna Yaza, King (?–1030s)
- Manuha, King (1030s–1057)

Philippines

- Rajahnate of Butuan (complete list) –

- Kiling, Rajah (989–1009)
- Sri Bata Shaja, Rajah (1011–?)

Thailand

- Ngoenyang (complete list) –

- Lao Som, King (early 11th century)
- Lao Kuak, King (mid 11th century)
- Lao Kiu, King (late 11th century)
- Lao Chong, King (11th–12th century)

Vietnam

- Champa (complete list) –

- Yang Pu Ku Vijaya, King (c.998–1007)
- Harivarman III, King (fl. 1010)
- Paramesvaravarman II, King (fl.1018)
- Vikrantavarman IV, King (?–1030)
- Jaya Sinhavarman II, King (1030–1044)
- Jaya Paramesvaravarman I, King (1044–?)
- Bhadravarman III, King (?–1061)
- Rudravarman III, King (1061–1074)
- Harivarman IV, King (1074–1080)
- Jaya Indravarman II, King (1080–1081, 1086–1114)
- Paramabhodhisatva, King (1081–1086)

- Đại Việt: Early Lê dynasty (complete list) –

- Lê Hoàn, Emperor (980–1005)
- Lê Trung Tông, Emperor (1005)
- Lê Long Đĩnh, Emperor (1005–1009)

- Đại Việt: Later Lý dynasty (complete list) –

- Lý Thái Tổ, Emperor (1009–1028)
- Lý Thái Tông, Emperor (1028–1054)
- Lý Thánh Tông, Emperor (1054–1072)
- Lý Nhân Tông, Emperor (1072–1127)

=== Asia: South ===
Afghanistan

- Ghaznavids (complete list) –

- Mahmud, Sultan (998–1030)
- Muhammad, Sultan (1030–1031, 1040–1041)
- Masʽud I, Sultan (1030–1040)
- Mawdud, Sultan (1041–1050)
- Masʽud II, Sultan (c.1050)
- Ali, Sultan (c.1050)
- Abd al-Rashid, Sultan (c.1050–1052)
- Toghrul, Sultan (1052–1053)
- Farrukh-Zad, Sultan (1053–1059)
- Ibrahim, Sultan (1059–1099)
- Masʽud III, Sultan (1099–1115)

- Ghurid dynasty (complete list) –

- Muhammad ibn Suri, Malik (10th century–1011)
- Abu Ali ibn Muhammad, Malik (1011–1035)
- Abbas ibn Shith, Malik (1035–1060)
- Muhammad ibn Abbas, Malik (1060–1080)
- Qutb al-din Hasan, Malik (1080–1100)
- Izz al-Din Husayn, Malik (1100–1146)

Bengal and Northeast India

- Kamarupa: Pala dynasty –

- Go Pala, King (990–1015)
- Harsha Pala, King (1015–1035)
- Dharma Pala, King (1035–1060)
- Jaya Pala, King (1075–1100)

- Mallabhum (complete list) –

- Jagat Malla, King (994–1007)
- Prakash Malla, King (1097–1102)

- Kingdom of Manipur (complete list) –

- Loiyumba, King (1074–1112)

- Pala Empire (complete list) –

- Mahipala I, King (977–1027)
- Nayapala, King (1027–1043)
- Vigrahapala III, King (1043–1070)
- Mahipala II, King (1070–1071)
- Shurapala, King (1071–1072)
- Ramapala, King (1072–1126)

- Pala dynasty of Kamarupa (complete list) –

- Go Pala, King (990–1015)
- Harsha Pala, King (1015–1035)
- Dharma Pala, King (1035–1060)
- Jaya Pala, King (1075–1100)

- Sena dynasty (complete list) –

- Hemanta Sena, King (1070–1096)
- Vijaya Sena, King (1096–1159)

India

- Amber Kingdom (complete list) –

- Sorha Deva, King (966–1006)
- Dullah Rai, King (1006–1036)
- Kakil, King (1036–1039)
- Hanu, King (1039–1053)
- Janddeo, King (1053–1070)
- Pajjun Rai, King (1070–1094)
- Malayasi, King (1094–1146)

- Chahamanas of Naddula (complete list) –

- Mahindra, King (c.994–1015)
- Ashvapala, King (c.1015–1019)
- Ahila, King (c.1019–1024)
- Anahilla, King (c.1024–1055)
- Balaprasada, King (c.1055–1070)
- Jendraraja, King (c.1070–1080)
- Prithvipala, King (c.1080–1090)
- Jojalladeva, King (c.1090–1110)

- Chahamanas of Shakambhari (complete list) –

- Govindaraja III, King (c.1012–1026)
- Vakpatiraja II, King (c.1026–1040)
- Viryarama, King (c.1040)
- Chamundaraja, King (c.1040–1065)
- Durlabharaja III, King (c.1065–1070)
- Vigraharaja III, King (c.1070–1090)
- Prithviraja I, King (c.1090–1110)

- Chandelas of Jejakabhukti (complete list) –

- Ganda-Deva, King (c.999–1002)
- Vidyadhara, King (c.1003–1035)
- Vijaya-Pala, King (c.1035–1050)
- Deva-Varman, King (c.1050–1060)
- Kirtti-Varman, King (c.1060–1100)
- Sallakshana-Varman, King (c.1100–1110)

- Chaulukya dynasty of Gujarat (complete list) –

- Chamundaraja, King (996–1008)
- Vallabharaja, King (1008)
- Durlabharaja, King (1008–1022)
- Bhima I, King (1022–1064)
- Karna, King (1064–1092)
- Jayasimha Siddharaja, King (1094–1143)

- Eastern Chalukyas (complete list) –

- Shaktivarman I, King (1000–1011)
- Vimaladitya, King (1011–1018)
- Rajaraja Narendra, King (1019–1061)
- Vijayaditya VII, King (?)

- Western Chalukya Empire (complete list) –

- Satyashraya, King (997–1008)
- Vikramaditya V, King (1008–1015)
- Jayasimha II, King (1015–1042)
- Someshvara I, King (1042–1068)
- Someshvara II, King (1068–1076)
- Vikramaditya VI, King (1076–1126)

- Chera Perumals of Makotai (complete list) –

- Bhaskara Ravi Manukuladithya, King (962–1021)
- Ravi Kotha Rajasimha, King (c.1021–c.1036)
- Raja Raja, King (c.1036–1089)
- Ravi Rama Rajadithya, King (c.1036–1089)
- Adithyan Kotha Ranadithya, King (c.1036–1089)
- Rama Varma Kulashekhara, King (1089–1102/22)

- Chola dynasty (complete list) –

- Rajaraja I, King (c.985–1014)
- Rajendra Chola I, King (1012–1044)
- Rajadhiraja Chola, King (1018–1054)
- Rajendra Chola II, King (1051–1063)
- Virarajendra Chola, King (1063–1070)
- Athirajendra Chola, King (1067–1070)
- Kulothunga Chola I, King (1070–1120)

- Gahadavala dynasty (complete list) –

- Chandradeva, King (c.1089–1103)

- Eastern Ganga dynasty (complete list) –

- Vajrahasta Aniyakabhima, King (980–1015)
- Vajrahasta Anantavarman or Vajrahasta V, King (1038–?)
- Rajaraja Devendravarman or Rajaraja Deva I, King (?–1078)
- Anantavarman Chodaganga, King (1078–1150)

- Garhwal Kingdom (complete list) –

- Agasti Pal, King (995–1014)
- Surati Pal, King (1015–1036)
- Jay Pal, King (1037–1055)
- Anant Pal I, King (1056–1072)
- Anand Pal I, King (1072–1083)
- Vibhog Pal, King (1084–1101)

- Gurjara-Pratihara dynasty (complete list) –

- Rajapala, King (960–1018)
- Trilochanapala, King (1018–1027)
- Yasahpala, King (1024–1036)

- Hoysala Empire (complete list) –

- Nripa Kama II, King (1026–1047)
- Vinayaditya, King (1047–1098)
- Ereyanga, King (1098–1102)

- Kalachuris of Tripuri (complete list) –

- Kokalla II, King (990–1015)
- Gangeyadeva, King (1015–1041)
- Lakshmikarna, King (1041–1073)
- Yashahkarna, King (1073–1123)

- Kalahandi (complete list) –

- Raghunath Sai, Raja (1005–1040)

- Kumaon kingdom

Katyuri (complete list) –
- Deshat Dev, King (1000–1015)
- Padmata Dev, King (1015–1045)
- Subhiksharaja Dev, King (1045–1060)
- Dham Dev, King (?)
- Bir Dev, King (?)
Chand (complete list) –
- Vir Chand, King (1065–1080)
- Rup Chand, King (1080–1093)
- Laxmi Chand, King (1093–1113)

- Lohara dynasty (complete list) –

- Sangramaraja, King (1003–?)
- Hariraja, King (1028)
- Ananta-deva, King (1028–?)
- Kalasha (Ranaditya II), King (1063–?)
- Utkarsha, King (1089)
- Harsha, King (1089–1101)

- Pala dynasty of Kamarupa (complete list) –

- Go Pala, King (990–1015)
- Harsha Pala, King (1015–1035)
- Dharma Pala, King (1035–1060)
- Jaya Pala, King (1075–1100)

- Paramaras of Chandravati (complete list) –

- Dhurbhata, King (c.990–1000)
- Mahi-pala, King (c.1000–1020)
- Dhandhuka, King (c.1020–1040)
- Punya-pala or Purna-pala, King (c.1040–1050)
- Danti-varmman, King (c.1050–1060)
- Krishna-deva, or Krishna-raja II, King (c.1060–1090)
- Kakkala-deva, or Kakala-deva, King (c.1090–1115)

- Paramara dynasty of Malwa (complete list) –

- Sindhuraja, King (990s–1010)
- Bhoja, King (1010–1055)
- Jayasimha I, King (1055–1070)
- Udayaditya, King (1070–1086)
- Lakshmadeva, King (1086–1094)
- Naravarman, King (1094–1130)

Pakistan

- Hindu Shahi (complete list) –

- Jayapala, King (964–1001)
- Anandapala, King (1001–1010)
- Trilochanapala, King (1010–1021)

- Soomra dynasty –

- Khafif, King (1011–1026)
- Asimuddin Bhoongar, King (?–1064/65)
- Zainab Tari, Queen (1092–1102)

Sri Lanka

- Anuradhapura kingdom (complete list) –

- Sena V, King (991–1001)
- Mahinda V, King (1001–1017)

- Kingdom of Polonnaruwa (complete list) –

- Vijayabahu I, King (1056–1111)

=== Asia: West ===
Mesopotamia

- Abbasid Caliphate, Baghdad (complete list) –

- al-Qadir, Caliph (991–1031)
- al-Qa'im, Caliph (1031–1075)
- al-Muqtadi, Caliph (1075–1094)
- al-Mustazhir, Caliph (1094–1118)

- Hamdanid dynasty (complete list) –

Emirate of Aleppo
- Sa'id al-Dawla, Emir (991–1002)

Persia

- Buyid Empire (complete list) –

Buyids in Fars
- Baha' al-Dawla, Emir (998–1012)
- Sultan al-Dawla, Emir (1012–1024)
- Abu Kalijar, Emir (1024–1048)
- Abu Mansur Fulad Sutun, Emir (1048–1051)
- Abu Sa'd Khusrau Shah, Emir (1051–1054)
- Abu Mansur Fulad Sutun, Emir (1051–1062)

Buyids in Ray
- Majd al-Dawla, Emir (997–1029)

Buyids in Iraq
- Baha' al-Dawla, Emir (989–1012)
- Sultan al-Dawla, Emir (1012–1021)
- Musharrif al-Dawla, Emir (1021–1025)
- Jalal al-Dawla, Emir (1025–1044)
- Abu Kalijar, Emir (1044–1048)
- Al-Malik al-Rahim, Emir (1048–1055)

- Saffarid dynasty (complete list) –

- Khalaf ibn Ahmad, Amir (963–1002)

- Samanid Empire (complete list) –

- Isma'il Muntasir, Amir (1000–1004)

- Ziyarid dynasty (complete list) –

- Qabus, Emir (997–1012)
- Manuchihr, Emir (1012–1031)
- Anushirvan Sharaf al-Ma'ali, Emir (1030–1050)
- Keikavus, Emir (1050–1087)
- Gilanshah, Emir (1087–1090)

Yemen

- Yemeni Zaidi State (complete list) –

- al-Mansur al-Qasim al-Iyyani, Imam (999–1002)
- ad-Da'i Yusuf, Imam (1002–1012)
- al-Mahdi al-Husayn, Imam (1003–1013)
- al-Mu'ayyad Ahmad, Imam (1013–1020)
- Abu Talib Yahya, Imam (1020–1033)
- al-Mu’id li-Din Illah, Imam (1027–1030)
- Abu Hashim al-Hasan, Imam (1031–1040)
- Abu'l-Fath an-Nasir ad-Dailami, Imam (1038–1053)
- al-Muhtasib al-Mujahid Hamzah, Imam (1060–1067)

== Europe ==
=== Europe: Balkans ===
- First Bulgarian Empire (complete list) –

- Samuil, Emperor (997–1014)
- Gavril Radomir, Emperor (1014–1015)
- Ivan Vladislav, Emperor (1015–1018)

- Byzantine Empire (complete list) –

- Basil II, Emperor (976–1025)
- Constantine VIII, Emperor (1025–1028)
- Zoe, Emperor (1028–1034) (first reign) and Romanos III Argyros, Emperor (1028–1034)
- Zoe, Emperor (1034–1041) (first reign) and Michael IV the Paphlagonian, Emperor (1034–1041)
- Michael V Kalaphates, Emperor (1041–1042)
- Zoe, Emperor (1042) (second reign) with Theodora, Emperor (1042)
- Zoe, Emperor (1042–1050) (second reign) and Constantine IX Monomachos, Emperor (1042–1050)
- Constantine IX Monomachos, Emperor (1050–1055) (sole emperor)
- Theodora, Emperor (1055–1056)
- Michael VI Bringas, Emperor (1056–1057)
- Isaac I Komnenos, Emperor (1057–1059)
- Constantine X Doukas, Emperor (1059–1067)
- Romanos IV Diogenes, Emperor (1068–1071)
- Michael VII Doukas, Emperor (1068–1078) with brothers Andronikos, Emperor (1068–1078) and Konstantios, Emperor (1068–1078) and son Constantine, Emperor (1068–1078)
- Nikephoros III Botaneiates, Emperor (1078–1081)
- Alexios I Komnenos, Emperor (1081–1118)

- Kingdom of Croatia (complete list) –

- Svetoslav Suronja, King (997–1000)
- Gojslav, co-King (1000–c.1020)
- Krešimir III, co-King (1000–c.1030)
- Stephen I, King (c.1030–1058)
- Peter Krešimir IV, King (1058–1074)
- Demetrius Zvonimir, King (1075–1089)
- Stephen II, King (1089–1091)
- Ladislaus I of Hungary, King (1091–1095)
- Petar Snačić, claimant King (1093–1097)

thereafter ruled by kings of Hungary

- Duklja (complete list) –

- Petar, Archon (c.1000)
- Jovan Vladimir, Prince (c.1000–1016)
- Stefan Vojislav, Archon, King (1018–c.1043)
- Mihailo I, King (c.1077–1081)
- Constantine Bodin, King (1081–1101)

=== Europe: British Isles ===
==== Great Britain: Scotland ====
- Kingdom of Scotland/ Kingdom of Alba (complete list) –

- Kenneth III, King (997–1005)
- Malcolm II, King (1005–1034)
- Duncan I, King (1034–1040)
- Macbeth, King (1040–1057)
- Lulach, King (1057–1058)
- Malcolm III Canmore, King (1058–1093)
- Donald III, King (1093–1094)
- Duncan II, King (1094)
- Donald III, King (1094–1097)
- Edgar, King (1097–1107)

- Kingdom of Strathclyde (complete list) –

- Owain Foel, King (c.997–c.1018)
- Máel Coluim II, King (c.1054)

- Kingdom of the Isles (complete list) –

- Ragnall mac Gofraid, King (?–1004/05)
- Lagmann mac Gofraid, possible ruler (c.1005)
- Echmarcach mac Ragnaill, possible ruler (1052–1061)
- Murchad mac Diarmata, King (1061–1070)
- Fingal mac Gofraid, King (?–1074)
- Godred Crovan, King (1079–1094)
- Magnus Barefoot, King (1098–1102)

==== Great Britain: England ====
- Kingdom of England (complete list) –

- Æthelred the Unready, King (978–1013, 1014–1016)
- Sweyn, King (1013–1014)
- Edmund Ironside, King (1016)
- Cnut the Great, King (1016–1035)
- Harold Harefoot, King (1035–1040)
- Harthacnut, King (1040–1042)
- Edward the Confessor, King (1042–1066)
- Harold Godwinson, King (1066)
- Edgar Ætheling, King (1066)
- William the Conqueror, King (1066–1087)
- William II, King (1087–1100)
- Henry I, King (1100–1135)

==== Great Britain: Wales ====
- Glywysing (complete list) –

- Rhys ab Owain, King (c.990–c.1000)
- Iestyn ab Owain, King (c.990–c.1015)
- Hywel ab Owain, King (c.990–c.1043)
- Rhydderch ap Iestyn, King (c.1015–1033)
- Gruffydd ap Rhydderch, King (1033–1055)
- Gwrgant ab Ithel the Black, King (1033–1070)
- Gruffydd ap Llywelyn, King (1055–1063)
- Caradog ap Gruffydd, King (1063–1081)
- Iestyn ap Gwrgant, King (1081–1091)

- Gwent (complete list) –

- Rhodri ap Elisedd and Gruffydd ap Elisedd, co-Kings (983–c.1015)
- Edwyn ap Gwriad, King (1015–1045)
- Meurig ap Hywel and Cadwgan ap Meurig, co-Kings (1045–1055)

- Morgannwg (complete list) –

- Gruffydd ap Llywelyn, King (1055–1063)
- Cadwgan ap Meurig, King (1063–1074)
- Caradog ap Gruffydd, King (1075–1081)
- Iestyn ap Gwrgant, King (1081–1091)

- Kingdom of Gwynedd (complete list) –

- Cynan ap Hywel, King (999–1005)
- Aeddan ap Blegywryd, King (1005–1018)
- Llywelyn ap Seisyll, King (1018–1023)
- Iago ab Idwal ap Meurig, King (1023–1039)
- Gruffydd ap Llywelyn, King (1039–1063)
- Bleddyn ap Cynfyn, King (1063–1075)
- Trahaearn ap Caradog, King (1075–1081)
- Gruffydd ap Cynan, King (1081–1137)

- Kingdom of Powys (complete list) –

- Llywelyn ap Seisyll, King (999–1023)
- Rhydderch ap Iestyn, King (1023–1033)
- Iago ap Idwal, King (1033–1039)
- Gruffydd ap Llywelyn, King (1039–1063)
- Bleddyn ap Cynfyn, King/Prince (1063–1075)
- Iorwerth ap Bleddyn, Prince (1075–1103)
- Cadwgan ap Bleddyn, Prince (1075–1111)

- Deheubarth (complete list) –

- Cynan ap Hywel, prince of Gwynedd (999–1005)
- Edwin ab Einion, ruler (1005–1018)
- Cadell ab Einion, ruler (1005–1018)
- Llywelyn ap Seisyll, prince of Gwynedd (1018–1023)
- Rhydderch ap Iestyn, prince of Glywysing (1023–1033)
- Hywel ab Edwin, ruler (1033–1044)
- Gruffydd ap Rhydderch, ruler (1047–1055)
- Gruffydd ap Llywelyn, prince of Gwynedd (1055–1063)
- Maredudd ab Owain ab Edwin, ruler (1063–1072)
- Rhys ab Owain, ruler (1072–1078)
- Rhys ap Tewdwr, ruler (1078–1093)
- Gruffydd ap Rhys, ruler (1116–1137)

==== Ireland ====
- Ireland (complete list) –

- Máel Sechnaill mac Domnaill, High King (979–1002, 1014–1022)
- Brian Bóruma, High King (1002–1014)
- Donnchad mac Briain, High King (?–1064)
- Diarmait mac Máel na mBó, High King (?–1072)
- Toirdelbach Ua Briain, High King (?–1086)
- Muirchertach Ua Briain, High King (?–1119)

- Kingdom of Ailech (complete list) –

- Áed mac Domnaill Ua Néill, King (989–1004)
- Flaithbertach Ua Néill, King (1004–1031)
- Áed mac Flaithbertaig Ua Néill, King (1031–1033)
- Flaithbertach Ua Néill (again), King (1033–1036)
- Niall mac Máel Sechnaill, King (1036–1061)
- Ardgar mac Lochlainn, King (1061–1064)
- Áed Ua hUalgairg, King (1064–1067)
- Domnall mac Néill, King (1067–1068)
- Áed mac Néill, King (1068–1083)
- Donnchad mac Néill, King (1083–1083)
- Domnall Ua Lochlainn, King (1083–1121)

- Airgíalla (complete list) –

- Mac Leiginn mac Cerbaill, King (?–1022)
- Cathalan Ua Crichain, King (?–1027)
- Gilla Coluim ua Eichnech, King (?–1048)
- Leathlobair Ua Laidhgnen, King (?–1053)
- Leathlobair Ua Laidhgnen, King (?–1078)
- Aodh Ua Baoigheallain, King (?–1093)
- Ua Ainbhigh, King (?–1094)
- Cu Caishil Ua Cerbaill, King (?–1101)

- Kingdom of Breifne (complete list) –

- Niall Ó Ruairc, heir (1000–1001)
- Aedh Ó Ruairc, King (?–1014/15)
- Art an caileach Ó Ruairc, King (c.1020–c.1030)
- Aedh Ó Ruairc, Lord (1029)
- Art uallach (oirdnidhe) Ó Ruairc, King (c.1030–1046)
- Niall Ó Ruairc, King (1047)
- Domnall Ó Ruairc, Lord (c.1057)
- Cathal Ó Ruairc, Lord (c.1051–1059)
- Aedh in Gilla Braite Ó Ruairc, King (1066)
- Aed Ó Ruairc, King (c.1067–1087)
- Donnchadh cael Ó Ruairc, King (c.1084)
- Ualgharg Ó Ruairc, heir (1085)

- Connachta (complete list) –

- Cathal mac Conchobar mac Taidg, King (973–1010)
- Tadg in Eich Gil, King (?)
- Áed in Gai Bernaig, King (?)
- Ruaidrí na Saide Buide, King (?)
- Dubhchobhlaigh Bean Ua hEaghra, King (?)
- Tadg mac Ruaidrí Ua Conchobair, King (?)
- Domnall Ua Ruairc, King (1097–1102)

- Kingdom of Dublin (complete list) –

- Sigtrygg Silkbeard, King (989/995–1036)
- Echmarcach mac Ragnaill, King (1036–1038, 1046–1052)
- Ímar mac Arailt, King (1038–1046)
- Murchad mac Diarmata, King (1052–1070)
- Diarmait mac Máel na mBó, King (?–1072)
- Gofraid mac Amlaíb meic Ragnaill, King (1072–1075)
- Domnall mac Murchada, King (1075)
- Muirchertach Ua Briain, Governor (1075–1086)
- Donnchad mac Domnaill Remair, King (1086–1089)
- Godred Crovan, King (c.1091–1094)

- Leinster (complete list) –

- Donnchad mac Domnall Claen, King (984–1003)
- Máelmórda mac Murchada, King (1003–1014)
- Dúnlaing mac Tuathal, King (1014)
- Donncuan mac Dúnlainge, King (1014–1016)
- Bran mac Máelmórda, King (1016–1018)
- Augaire mac Dúnlainge, King (1018–1024)
- Donnchad mac Dúnlainge, King (1024–1033)
- Donnchad mac Gilla Pátraic, King (1033–1039)
- Murchad mac Dúnlainge, King (1039–1042)
- Diarmait mac Maíl na mBó, King (1042–1072)
- Murchad mac Diarmata, King (1052–1070)
- Domnall mac Murchada, King (1072–1075)
- Donnchad mac Domnaill Remair, King (1075–1089)
- Énna mac Diarmata, King (1089–1092)
- Diarmait mac Énna, King (1092–1098)
- Donnchadh mac Murchada, King (1098–1115)

- Magh Luirg (complete list) –

- Tadhg mac Muirchertach, King (?)
- Maelruanaidh mac Tadhg, King (fl.1080)

- Kingdom of Meath (complete list) –

- Máel Sechnaill mac Domnaill, King (975/976–1022)
- Mael Sechnaill Got mac Mael Sechnaill, King (1022–1025)
- Roen mac Muirchertaig, King (1025–1027)
- Domnall Got, King (1027–1030)
- Conchobar ua Mael Sechlainn, King (1030–1073)
- Murchad mac Flainn Ua Mael Sechlainn, King (1073)
- Mael Sechlainn Ban mac Conchobair Ua Mael Sechlainn, King (1073–1087)
- Domnall mac Flainn Ua Mael Sechlainn, King (1087–1094)
- Donnchad mac Murchada Ua Mael Sechlainn, King (1094–1105)
- Conchobar mac Mael Sechlainn Ua Mael Sechlainn, King (1094–1105)

- Kingdom of Munster (complete list) –

- Brian Boru, King (978–1014)
- Dúngal Hua Donnchada, King (1014–1025)
- Donnchad mac Briain, King (1025–1064)
- Murchad mac Donnchada, King (1064–1068)
- Toirdelbach Ua Briain, King (1064-1086)
- Muirchertach Ua Briain, King (1086–1114, 1118–1119)

- Síol Anmchadha (complete list) –

- Cú Connacht mac Dundach, King (1006)
- Madudan mac Gadhra Mór, King (1008)
- Gadhra Mór mac Dundach, King (1008–1027)
- Dogra mac Dúnadach, King (1027)
- Dunadach mac Cú Connacht, King (1027–1032)
- Diarmaid mac Madudan, King (1032–1069)
- Madudan Reamhar Ua Madadhan, King (1069–1096)
- Gillafin Mac Coulahan, King (1096–1101)

- Uí Maine (complete list) –

- Tadhg Mór Ua Cellaigh, King (?–1014)
- Concobar mac Tadg Ua Cellaigh, King (?–1030)
- Mac Tadhg Ua Cellaigh, King (?–1065)
- Dunchadh Ua Cellaigh, King (?–1074)
- Aed Ua Cellaigh, King (?–1134)

- Ulaid / Ulster (complete list) –

- Eochaid mac Ardgail, King (972–1004)

=== Europe: Central ===
Holy Roman Empire in Germany

See also List of state leaders in the 11th-century Holy Roman Empire

- Holy Roman Empire, Kingdom of Germany (complete list, complete list) –

- Otto III, Holy Roman Emperor (996–1002), King (983–1002)
- Henry II, Holy Roman Emperor (1014–1024), King (1002–1024)
- Conrad II, Holy Roman Emperor (1027–1039), King (1024–1039)
- Henry III, Holy Roman Emperor (1046–1056), King (1028–1056)
- Henry IV, Holy Roman Emperor (1084–1105), King (1053–1087)
- Conrad II of Italy, King (1087–1098)
- Henry V, Holy Roman Emperor (1111–1125), King (1099–1125)

Hungary

- Kingdom of Hungary (1000–1301) (complete list) –

- Stephen I, Grand Prince (997–1000), King (1000–1038)
- Peter, King (1038–1041, 1044–1046)
- Samuel, King (1041–1044)
- Andrew I, King (1046–1060)
- Béla I, King (1060–1063)
- Solomon, King (1063–1074)
- Géza I, King (1074–1077)
- Ladislaus I, King (1077–1095)
- Coloman, King (1095–1116)

Poland

- Civitas Schinesghe, Kingdom of Poland (complete list) –

- Bolesław I, Duke (992–1025), King (1025)
- Mieszko II Lambert, King (1025–1031), Duke (1032–1034)
- Bezprym, Duke (1031–1032)
- Bolesław the Forgotten, Duke (1034–1038/39)
- Casimir I the Restorer, Duke (1040–1058)
- Bolesław II the Generous, Duke (1058–1076), King (1076–1079)
- Władysław I Herman, Duke (1079–1102)

=== Europe: East ===
- Duchy of Belz (complete list) –

- Wsewolod Mstislawitsch of Volhynien, Duke (1170-1195)

- Volga Bulgaria (complete list) –

- Abd ar-Rahman bine Mö'min, ruler (980–1006)

- Khazar Khaganate (complete list) –

- Georgius Tzul, ruler (?–1016)

- Principality of Peremyshl (complete list) –

- Ryurik Rostislavich, Prince (1085–1092)

- Principality of Polotsk (complete list) –

- Izyaslav, Prince (989–1001)

- Kievan Rus' (complete list) –

- Vladimir I the Great, Grand Prince (980–1015)
- Sviatopolk I the Accursed, Grand Prince (1015–1019)
- Yaroslav I the Wise, Grand Prince (1019–1054)
- Iziaslav I of Kiev, Grand Prince (1054–1073)
- Sviatoslav II of Kiev, Grand Prince (1073–1076)
- Iziaslav I of Kiev, Grand Prince (1076–1078)
- Vsevolod I of Kiev, Grand Prince (1078–1093)
- Sviatopolk II of Kiev, Grand Prince (1093–1113)

- Principality of Turov (complete list) –

- Sviatopolk Vladimirovich, Prince (997–1019)

=== Europe: Nordic ===
Denmark

- Denmark (complete list) –

- Sweyn Forkbeard, King (986–1014)
- Harald II, King (1014–1018)
- Cnut the Great, King (1018–1035)
- Harthacnut, King (1035–1042)
- Magnus the Good, King (1042–1047)
- Sweyn II, King (1047–1076)
- Harald III, King (1076–1080)
- Canute, King (1080–1086)
- Olaf I, King (1086–1095)
- Eric, King (1095–1103)

- North Sea Empire –

- Cnut the Great, King (1013–1035)
- Harthacnut, King (1035–1042)

Norway

- Kingdom of Norway (872–1397) (complete list) –

- Sweyn Forkbeard, King (c.985–995, 1000–1014)
- Eric Haakonsson & Sweyn Haakonsson, Regents (1000–1015)
- Olaf II of Norway, King (1015–1028)
- Haakon Ericsson, Regent (1012–1015, 1028–1029)
- Cnut the Great, King (1028–1035)
- Svein Knutsson, co-King (1030–1035)
- Magnus I the Good, King (1035–1047)
- Harald Hardrada, King (1046–1066)
- Magnus II, King (1066–1069)
- Olaf III of Norway, King (1067–1093)
- Haakon Magnusson, King (1093–1094)
- Magnus III Barefoot, King (1093–1103)

Sweden

- Sweden (800–1521) (complete list) –

- Olof Skötkonung, King (c.995–1022)
- Anund Jacob, King (1022–1050)
- Emund the Old, King (1050–1060)
- Stenkil, King (1060–1066)
- Eric and Eric, Kings (c.1066–c.1067)
- Halsten Stenkilsson, King (c.1067–c.1070, c.1079–post-1081)
- Anund Gårdske, King (c.1070)
- Håkan the Red, King (c.1075–c.1079)
- Inge the Elder, King (c.1079–c.1084, c.1087–c.1105/10)
- Blot-Sweyn, King (c.1084–c.1087)

=== Europe: Southcentral ===
States of Italy in 1000 AD.

See also List of state leaders in the 11th-century Holy Roman Empire#Italy

- Kingdom of Italy (complete list) –

- Otto III, King (996–1002)
- Arduin of Ivrea, King (1002–1014)
- Henry II, King (1004–1024)
- Conrad II, King (1026–1039)
- Henry III, King (1039–1056)
- Henry IV, King (1056–1105)
- Conrad II of Italy, King (1093–1098)
- Henry V, King (1098–1125)

- March of Montferrat (complete list) –

- William III, ruler (991–pre-1042)
- Otto II, ruler (pre-1042–c.1084)
- Henry, ruler (?–1045)
- William IV, Marquis (c.1084–c.1100)

- Papal States (complete list) –

- Sylvester II, Pope (999–1003)
- John XVII, Pope (1003)
- John XVIII, Pope (1003–1009)
- Sergius IV, Pope (1009–1012)
- Benedict VIII, Pope (1012–1024)
- John XIX, Pope (1024–1032)
- Benedict IX, Pope (1032–1044)
- Sylvester III, Pope (1045)
- Benedict IX, Pope (1045)
- Gregory VI, Pope (1045–1046)
- Clement II, Pope (1046–1047)
- Benedict IX, Pope (1047–1048)
- Damasus II, Pope (1048)
- Leo IX, Pope (1049–1054)
- Victor II, Pope (1055–1057)
- Stephen IX, Pope (1057–1058)
- Nicholas II, Pope (1058–1061)
- Alexander II, Pope (1061–1073)
- Gregory VII, Pope (1073–1085)
- Victor III, Pope (1086–1087)
- Urban II, Pope (1088–1099)
- Paschal II, Pope (1099–1118)

- Duchy of Spoleto (complete list) –

- Romanus, Duke (1003–1010)
- Rainier, Duke (1010–1020)
- Hugh II, Duke (1020–1035)
- Hugh III, Duke (1036–1043)
- Boniface III, Duke (1043–1052)
- Frederick, Duke (1052–1055)
- Beatrice of Lorraine, Regent (1052–1055)
- Godfrey the Bearded, Regent (1053–1055)
to the papacy (1056–1057)
- Matilda, Duchess (1057–1082)
- Godfrey the Bearded, Duke (1057–1069)
- Godfrey the Hunchback, Duke (1069–1076)
- Rainier II, Duke (1082–1086)
- Matilda, Duke (1086–1093)
- Werner II, Duke (1093–1119)

- March of Tuscany (complete list) –

- Hugh the Great, Margrave (961–1001)
- Boniface, Margrave (1004–1011)
- Rainier, Margrave (1014–1027)
- Boniface III, Margrave (1027–1052)
- Beatrice of Bar, Regent (1052–1054)
- Frederick, Margrave (1052–1055)
- Godfrey III the Bearded, Regent (1055–1069)
- Godfrey IV the Hunchback, Regent (1069–1076)
- Matilda, Margravine (1076–1115)

- Republic of Venice (complete list) –

- Pietro II Orseolo, Doge (991–1009)
- Otto Orseolo, Doge (1009–1026)
- Pietro Barbolano, Doge (1026–1032)
- Domenico Flabanico, Doge (1032–1043)
- Domenico Contarini, Doge (1043–1071)
- Domenico Selvo, Doge (1071–1084)
- Vitale Faliero, Doge (1084–1096)
- Vitale I Michiel, Doge (1096–1102)

==== Southern Italy ====
Southern Italy

- Duchy of Amalfi (complete list) –

- Manso I, Duke (966–1004)

- County/ Duchy of Apulia and Calabria (complete list) –

- William I Iron Arm, Count (1042–1046)
- Drogo, Count (1046–1051)
- Humphrey, Count (1051–1057)
- Robert Guiscard, Count (1057–1059), Duke (1059–1085)
- Roger I Borsa, Duke (1085–1111)

- Principality of Benevento (complete list) –

- Pandulf II, Prince (981–1014)
- Landulf V, co-ruler (987–1014), Prince (1014–1033)
- Pandulf III, co-ruler (1012–1033), Prince (1033–1053)
- Landulf VI, co-ruler (1038–1053), Prince (1059–1077)

- Principality of Capua (complete list) –

- Landulf VII, Prince (999–1007)
- Pandulf II, Prince (1007–1022)
- Pandulf III, Prince (1009–1014)
- Pandulf IV, Prince (1016–1022, 1026–1038, 1047–1050)
- Pandulf V, Prince (1022–1026)
- John, Prince (1023–1026)
- Guaimar, Prince (1038–1047)
- Pandulf VI, Prince (1050–1057)
- Landulf VIII, Prince (1057–1058)
- Landulf VI, Prince (1038–1050)

- Catepanate of Italy (complete list) –

- Gregory Tarchaneiotes, Catepan (998–1006)

- Duchy of Gaeta (complete list) –

- John III, co-Duke (979–984), Duke (984–1008)
- John IV, co-Duke (991–1008), Duke (1008–1012)
- Emilia, Regent (1012–1027)
- Leo I, Regent (1017–1023)
- John V, Duke (1012–1032)
- Pandulf I, Duke (1032–1038)
- Pandulf II, co–Duke (1032–1038)
- Leo II, Duke (1042)
- Guaimar, Duke (1042–1045)
- Ranulf, Duke (1042–1045)
- Asclettin, Duke (1045)
- Atenulf I, Duke (1045–1062)
- Atenulf II, Duke (1062–1064)
- Maria, Regent (1062–1065)
- William I, Duke (1064)
- Lando, Duke (1064–1065)
- Dannibaldo, Duke (1066–1067)
- Geoffrey, Duke (1068–1086)
- Reginald, Duke (1086–?)
- Gualganus, Duke (?–1091)
- Landulf, Duke (1091–1103)

- March of Ivrea (complete list) –

- Arduin, Margrave (c.990–1015)

- Duchy of Naples (complete list) –

- John IV, Duke (997/999–1005)
- Sergius IV, Duke (1005–1038)
- John V, Duke (1033–1050)
- Sergius V, Duke (1038–1076)
- Sergius VI, Duke (1077–1107)
- John VI, Duke (1090–1122)

- Principality of Salerno (complete list) –

- Guaimar III, Prince (994–1027)
- Guaimar IV, Prince (1027–1052)
- Gisulf II, Prince (1052–1077)

- Emirate of Sicily (complete list) –

- Ja'far al-Kalbi, Emir (998–1019)
- al-Akhal, Emir (1019–1037)
- Abdallah, usurper emir (1037–1040)
- Hasan as-Samsam, Emir (1040–1053)
- Ayyub ibn Tamim, Emir (1065–1068)

- County of Sicily (complete list) –

- Roger I, Count (1071–1101)

- Principality of Taranto (complete list) –

- Bohemond I, Count (1085–1088), Prince (1088–1111)

=== Europe: Southwest ===
==== Iberian Peninsula: Christian ====
Iberian Peninsula: Christian

- Kingdom of Aragon (complete list) –

- Ramiro I, King (1035–1063)
- Sancho Ramírez, King (1063–1094)
- Peter I, King (1094–1104)

- Kingdom of Castile (complete list) –

- Ferdinand I the Great, King (1037–1065)
- Sancho II the Strong, King (1065–1072)
- Alfonso VI the Brave, King (1072–1109)

- County of Barcelona (complete list) –

- Ramon Borrell, Count (988–1018)
- Berenguer Ramon I, Count (1018/1023–1035)
- Ramon Berenguer I, Count (1035/1039–1076)
- Ramon Berenguer II, Count (1076–1082)
- Berenguer Ramon II, Count (1076–1097)
- Ramon Berenguer III, Count (1082–1131)

- County of Castile (complete list) –

- Sancho García, Count (995–1017)

- Kingdom of León (complete list) –

- Alfonso V, King (999–1028)

- Kingdom of Navarre (complete list) –

- Peter I, King (1094–1104)

- County of Pallars (complete list) –

- Ermengol I, Count (992–1010)
- Suñer I, Count (995–1011)

- Kingdom of Pamplona (complete list) –

- García Sánchez II, King (994–1000/1004)

- County of Portugal (complete list) –

- Mendo II Gonçalves, Count (997–1008)

- County of Ribagorza (complete list) –

- Isarn, Count (990–1003)
- Tota, Count (1003–1010)
- William Isarn, Count (1010–1018)
- Mayor García of Castile, Count (1010–1025)
- Raymond III of Pallars (1010–1025)
- Sancho III of Pamplona, Count (1018–1035)
- Gonzalo, Count (1035–1045)
- Peter I of Aragon and Navarre, Count (c.1085)
- Sancho Ramírez, Count (1083–1093)

- Kingdom of Viguera (complete list) –

- Sancho Ramírez, King (c.991–c.1002)

==== Iberian Peninsula: Muslim ====
Iberian Peninsula: Muslim

- Caliphate of Córdoba (complete list) –

- Hisham II, Caliph (976–1008, 1010–1012)
- Muhammad II, Caliph (1008–1009)
- Sulayman ibn al-Hakam, Caliph (1009–1010, 1012–1017)
- Abd ar-Rahman IV, Caliph (1021–1022)
- Abd ar-Rahman V, Caliph (1022–1023)
- Muhammad III, Caliph (1023–1024)
- Hisham III, Caliph (1027–1031)

- Taifa of Alpuente (complete list) –

- 'Abd Allah I, Emir (c.1009–1030)
- Muhammad I Yumn ad-Dawla, Emir (1030–1042)
- Ahmad b Muhammad 'Izz (o Adud) al-Dawla, Emir (1042–1043)
- Muhammad II, Emir (1043)
- 'Abd Allah II, Emir (1043–c.1106)

==== Marca Hispanica ====
Marca Hispanica

- County of Osona (complete list) –

- Guisla de Lluça, Count (1035–1054)
- William, Count (1035–1054)
- Jimena, Count (1107–1149)

- County of Cerdanya (complete list) –

- Wilfred II, Count (988–1035)
- Raymond, Count (1035–1068)
- William I, Count (1068–1095)
- William II, Count (1095–1109)

- County of Urgell (complete list) –

- Ermengol I of Córdoba, Count (992–1010)
- Ermengol II the Pilgrim, Count (1010–1038)
- Ermengol III of Barbastro, Count (1038–1065)
- Ermengol IV of Gerp, Count (1065–1092)
- Ermengol V of Mollerussa, Count (1092–1102)

=== Europe: West ===
- Kingdom of France (complete list) –

- Robert II, King (987–1031)
- Henry I, King (1027–1060)
- Philip I, King (1059–1108)

- County of Angoulême (complete list) –

- William IV (Taillefer II), Count (988–1028)
- Alduin (II), Count (1028–1031)
- Geoffrey, Count (1031–1047)
- Fulk, Count (1047–1087)
- William V (Taillefer III), Count (1087–1120)

- Anjou (complete list) –

- Fulk III, Count (987–1040)
- Geoffrey II, Count (1040–1060)
- Geoffrey III, Count (1060–1067)

- Duchy of Aquitaine (complete list) –

- William V, Duke (995–1030)
- William VI, Duke (1030–1038)
- Odo, Duke (1038–39)
- William VII, Duke (1039–1058)
- William VIII, Duke (1058–1086)
- William IX, Duke (1086–1127)

- Auvergne (complete list) –

- William IV of Auvergne, Count (989–1016)
- Robert I of Auvergne, Count (1016–1032)
- William V of Auvergne, Count (1032–1064)
- Robert II of Auvergne, Count (1064–1096)
- William VI of Auvergne, Count (1096–1136)

- County of Bar (complete list) –

- Theodoric I, Count (978–1026/1027)

- County of Blois (complete list) –

- Theobald IV, Count (995–1004)

- County of Boulogne (complete list) –

- Baldwin II, Count (990–1025)
- Eustace I, Count (1032–1049)
- Eustace II, Count (1049–1087)
- Eustace III, ruler (1087–1125)

- Bourbonnais (complete list) –

- Archambaud III de Bourbon, Lord (1034–c.1078)
- Archambaud IV de Bourbon, Lord (c.1078–1095)
- Archambaud V de Bourbon, Lord (1095–1096)
- Archambaud VI de Bourbon, Lord (1096–1116)

- Duchy of Brittany (complete list) –

- Geoffrey I, Duke (992–1008)
- Alan III, Duke (1008–1040)
- Odo I, Duke (1008–1034)
- Conan II, Duke (1040–1066)
- Hawise, Duchess (1066–1072)
- Hoël II, Duke (1066–1072)
- Alan IV, Duke (1072–1112)

- Kingdom of Burgundy-Arles (complete list) –

- Rudolph III, King (993–1032)

For the succeeding rulers of Burgundy (later called Arles), see List of state leaders in the 11th-century Holy Roman Empire#Burgundian-Low Countries

- Duchy of Burgundy (complete list) –

- Eudes Henry, Duke (965–1002)
- Otto-William, Count (982–1026), Duke (1002–1004)
- Robert, Duke (1004–1016)
- Henry, Duke (1016–1032)
- Robert I, Duke (1032–1076)
- Hugh I, Duke (1076–1079)
- Odo I, Duke (1079–1103)

- Provence/ Lower Burgundy (complete list) –

- Rotbold I, Count (961–1008)
- William II, Count (994–1018)
- Rotbold II, Count (1008–1014)
- Emma, Countess (1037–1062) and William III, Count (1014–1037)
- William IV, Count (1018–1030)
- Fulk Bertrand, Count (1018–1051)
- Geoffrey I, Count (1032–1062)
- William Bertrand, Count (1051–1094)
- Geoffrey II, Count (1063–1067)
- Bertrand II, Count (1063–1093)
- Gerberga, Countess (1093–1112)

- County of Flanders (complete list) –

- Baldwin IV the Bearded, Count (988–1037)
- Baldwin V of Lille, Count (1037–1067)
- Baldwin VI, Count (1067–1070)
- Arnulf III, Count (1070–1071)
- Robert I the Frisian, Count (1071–1093)
- Robert II, Count (1093–1111)

- Duchy of Gascony (complete list) –

- Bernat I, Duke (996–1009)
- Sans VI, Duke (1009–1032)
- Odo, Duke (1032–1039)
- Bernat II, Duke (1039–1052)
- William VIII, Duke (1052–1086)
- William IX, Duke (1086–1126)

- Lorraine (complete list) –

- Theodoric I, Duke (978–1026/1027)

- Lower Lorraine (complete list) –

- Otto, Duke (977–1012)

- County of Maine (complete list) –

- Hugh III, Count (992–1015)
- Herbert I Wakedog, Count (1015–1032)
- Hugh IV, Count (1036–1051)
- Herbert II, Count (1058–1062)
- Walter of Mantes, Count (1062–1063)
- Robert Curthose, Count (1063–1069)
- Hugh V, Count (1069–1093)
- Elias I, Count (1093–1110)

- County of Nevers (complete list) –

- Landri, Count (992–1028)
- Renaud I, Count (1031–1040)
- William I, Count (1040–1083)
- Renaud II, Count (1083–1097)
- William II, Count (1097–1148)

- Duchy of Normandy (complete list) –

- Richard II, Duke (996–1026)

- County of Poitou (complete list) –

- William III, Count (969–1030)
- William IV, Count (1030–1038)
- Odo, Count (1038–1039)
- William V, Count (1039–1058)
- William VI, Count (1058–1086)
- William VII, Count (1071–1126)
- William VIII, Count (1099–1137)

- County of Toulouse (complete list) –

- William III Taillefer, Count (978–1037)
- Pons, Count (1037–1061)
- William IV, Count (1061–1094)
- Raymond IV (VI) of St Gilles, Count (1094–1105)
- Philippa & William IX, Countess & Count (1098–1101, 1109–1117)

- County of Vermandois (complete list) –

- Albert II, Count (997–1035)
- Otto, Count (1035–1045)
- Herbert IV, Count (1045–1080)
- Odo I, Count (1080–1085)
- Adelaide, Countess (1085–1101)

=== Eurasia: Caucasus ===
- Kingdom of Abkhazia (complete list) –

- Bagrat III, King (978–1014)

- Kingdom of Georgia (complete list) –

- Bagrat III, King (1008–1014)
- George I, King (1014–1027)
- Bagrat IV, King (1027–1072)
- George II, King (1072–1089)
- David IV, King (1089–1125)

- Bagratid Armenia (complete list) –

- Gagik I, King (989–1020)
- Hovhannes-Smbat of Ani, King (1020–1040)
- Ashot IV the Valiant, King (1021–1039)
- Gagik II, King (1042–1045)

- Kingdom of the Iberians (complete list) –

- Sumbat III, King (992/993–1011)
- Gurgen, King (c.1012)

- Principality of Iberia (complete list) –

- Gurgen of Georgia, King (994–1008)

- First Kingdom of Kakheti (complete list) –

- David, Prince (976–1010)
- Kvirike III, Prince (1014–1029)

- Klarjeti (complete list) –

- Sumbat III, King (992/993–1011)
- John Abuser, King (1011–1030)
- Abuser I Abuserisdze, King (c.1046/47)
- Grigol Abuserisdze, King (1047–1070)
- Abuser II Abuserisdze, King (11th/12th century)

== Oceania ==
Chile

- Easter Island (complete list) –

- Uru Kenu, King (c.1000)
- Te Rurua Tiki Te Hatu, King (?)
- Nau Ta Mahiki, King (?)
- Te Rika Tea, King (?)
- Te Teratera, King (?)
- Te Ria Kautahito (Hirakau-Tehito?), King (?)

Tonga

- Tuʻi Tonga Empire (complete list) –

- Fangaʻoneʻone, King (?)
- Līhau, King (?)
- Kofutu, King (?)
- Kaloa, King (?)
- Maʻuhau, King (?)

== See also ==
- List of political entities in the 11th century
- List of state leaders in the 11th-century Holy Roman Empire
