= Anyamata =

Eze Nri Anyamata
- Eze Nri
- Reign: 1465–1511 CE
- Predecessor: Eze Nri Ọmalonyeso
- Successor: Eze Nri Fenenu
- Dynasty: Nri Kingdom

Eze Nri Anyamata was the seventh king of Nri Kingdom after succeeding Eze Nri Ọmalonyeso. He was succeeded by Eze Nri Fenenu after he reigned from 1465 to 1511 CE.

Regnal titles
Preceded by Eze Nri Ọmalonyeso	Eze Nri; 1465 – 1511	Succeeded by Eze Nri Fenenu
