= Apia and Alike =

Eze Nri Apia and Nri–Alike
- Eze Nri
- Reign: 1677–1700 CE
- Predecessor: Eze Nri Agụ
- Successor: Eze Nri Ezimilo
- Died: 1700 CE
- Dynasty: Nri Kingdom

Eze Nri Apia and Nri–Alike were the first and only kings to rule Nri Kingdom as joint monarchs. After succeeding Eze Nri Agụ in 1676 CE, they reigned from 1677–1700 CE. they both replaced Eze Nri Agu and where traders who traded in slaves it is believed that it is through both kings that slave trade entered the Nri kingdom and all Igboland. It is believed that Eze Nri Apia and Nri–Alike died on the same day.

Regnal titles
Preceded by Eze Nri Agụ	Eze Nri; 1677 – 1700	Succeeded by Eze Nri Ezimilo
