= Ọmalọ =

Eze Nri Ọmalọ
- Eze Nri
- Reign: 1260–1299 CE
- Predecessor: Eze Nri Buífè
- Successor: Eze Nri Jiọfọ I
- Dynasty: Nri Kingdom

Eze Nri Ọmalọ was the fourth king of Nri Kingdom after succeeding Eze Nri Buífè. He reigned from 1260–1299 CE.

Regnal titles
Preceded by Eze Nri Buífè	Eze Nri; 1260 – 1299	Succeeded by Eze Nri Jiọfọ I
