= Buífè =

Eze Nri Buífè
- Eze Nri
- Reign: 1260–1299 CE
- Predecessor: Eze Nri Nàmóke
- Successor: Eze Nri Ọmalọ
- Dynasty: Nri Kingdom

Eze Nri Buífè was the third king of Nri Kingdom after succeeding Eze Nri Nàmóke. Succeeded by Eze Nri Ọmalọ, he reigned from 1159–1259 CE.

Regnal titles
Preceded by Eze Nri Nàmóke	Eze Nri; 1159 – 1259	Succeeded by Eze Nri Ọmalọ
