= Ènweleána II Obidiegwu Onyeso =

Eze Ènweleána II Obidiegwu Onyesoh
- Eze Nri
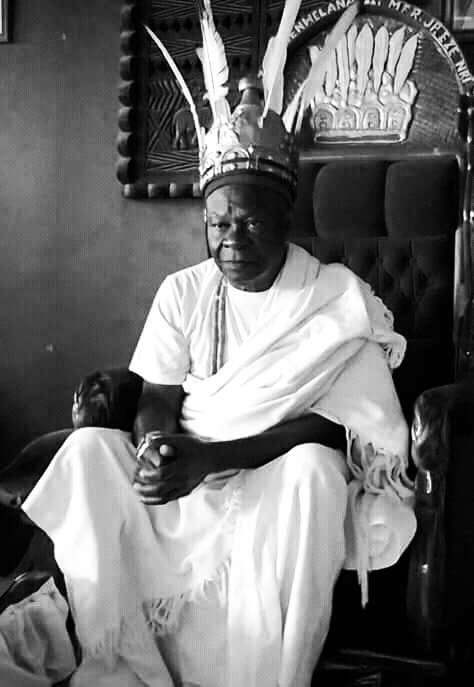
- Reign: 1988–present
- Predecessor: Eze Jiọfọ II Taabansi Udene
- Born: Obeagu

Eze Ènweleána II Obidiegwu Onyesoh was the 16th recorded, Eze Nri of the Kingdom of Nri in modern-day southeastern Nigeria. He reigned the remnant of one of the oldest kingdoms in contemporary Nigeria, and retains a ritual significance as the symbol of one of that country's most historically relevant peoples. His son Prince Ikenna Onyeso is the Regent until a new king emerges.

Regnal titles
Preceded by Eze Nri Jiọfọ II Taabansi Udene	Eze Nri; 1988 – present	Succeeded by none
