= Jiọfọ I =

Eze Nri Jiọfọ I
- Eze Nri
- Reign: 1300–1390 CE
- Predecessor: Eze Nri Ọmalọ
- Successor: Eze Nri Ọmalonyeso
- Dynasty: Nri Kingdom

Eze Nri Jiọfọ I was the fifth king of Nri Kingdom after succeeding Eze Nri Ọmalọ. He reigned from 1300 to 1390 CE.

Regnal titles
Preceded by Eze Nri Ọmalọ	Eze Nri; 1300 – 1390	Succeeded by Eze Nri Ọmalonyeso
