= Ezimilo =

Eze Nri Ezimilo
- Eze Nri
- Reign: 1701–1723 CE
- Predecessor: Eze Nri Apia and Nri–Alike
- Successor: Eze Nri Èwenétem
- Died: 1723 CE
- Dynasty: Nri Kingdom

Eze Nri Ezimilo was the eleventh king of the Nri Kingdom who reigned from 1701 to 1723 CE after succeeding Eze Nri Apia and Nri–Alike around 1700 CE.

Regnal titles
Preceded by Eze Nri Apia and Nri–Alike	Eze Nri; 1701 – 1723	Succeeded by Eze Nri Èwenétem
