= Ọmalonyeso =

Eze Nri Ọmalonyeso
- Eze Nri
- Reign: 1391–1464 CE
- Predecessor: Eze Nri Jiọfọ I
- Successor: Eze Nri Anyamata
- Dynasty: Nri Kingdom

Eze Nri Ọmalonyeso was the sixth king of Nri Kingdom after succeeding Eze Nri Jiọfọ I. He was succeeded by Eze Nri Anyamata after he reigned from 1391–1464 CE.

Regnal titles
Preceded by Eze Nri Jiọfọ I	Eze Nri; 1391 – 1464	Succeeded by Eze Nri Anyamata
