= Agu (Eze Nri) =

Eze Nri Agụ was the ninth king of Nri Kingdom after succeeding Eze Nri Fenenu. He reigned from 1583–1676 CE. After replacing Eze Nir Fenenu, he became one of the most powerful kings that ever ruled Nri. He was succeeded by Eze Nri Apia and Nri Alike.

== History ==
After succeeding Eze Nri Fenenu, Eze Nri Agu quickly consolidated power, increasing trade and wealth in the kingdom. The start of Eze Nri Agu's reign was successful, but as time grew, he quickly deplored the life in the kingdom. So, he abandoned the kingdom. He and his followers left Nri in secret and founded a chiefly lineage at Oraukwu. His reign was also an ending of Kingship in Nri. According to M.A Onwuejeogwu, the greatest of Nri was during the reign of Eze Nri Agu.

Regnal titles
Preceded by Eze Nri Fenenu	Eze Nri; 1583 – 1676	Succeeded by Eze Nri Apia and Nri–Alike
