= Fenenu =

Eze Nri Fenenu
- Eze Nri
- Reign: 1512–1582 CE
- Predecessor: Eze Nri Anyamata
- Successor: Eze Nri Agụ
- House: Agbadana
- Dynasty: Nri Kingdom

Eze Nri Fenenu was the eighth king of Nri Kingdom after succeeding Eze Nri Anyamata. He reigned from 1512–1582 CE. He was Alleged to be a mystic and Spiritualist and was removed and replaced as king due to his mystical powers, and even worse his people were banned from ever ruling the Nri kingdom.

Regnal titles
| Preceded by Eze Nri Anyamata | Eze Nri; 1512 – 1582 | Succeeded by Eze Nri Agụ |
