= List of state leaders in the 11th-century Holy Roman Empire =

This is a list of state leaders in the 11th century (1001–1100) AD, of the Holy Roman Empire.

== Main ==
- Holy Roman Empire, Kingdom of Germany (complete list, complete list) –

- Otto III, Holy Roman Emperor (996–1002), King (983–1002)
- Henry II, Holy Roman Emperor (1014–1024), King (1002–1024)
- Conrad II, Holy Roman Emperor (1027–1039), King (1024–1039)
- Henry III, Holy Roman Emperor (1046–1056), King (1028–1056)
- Henry IV, Holy Roman Emperor (1084–1105), King (1053–1087)
- Conrad II of Italy, King (1087–1098)
- Henry V, Holy Roman Emperor (1111–1125), King (1099–1125)

== Austrian ==
- Margraviate of Austria (complete list) –

- Henry I, Margrave (994–1018)
- Adalbert, Margrave (1018–1055)
- Ernest, Margrave (1055–1075)
- Leopold II, Margrave (1075–1095)
- Leopold III, Margrave (1095–1136)

- County of Bregenz (complete list) –

- Ulrich IX, Count (1043–pre-1079)
- Ulrich X, Couint (1079–1097)
- Rudolf I, Couint (1097–1160)

- Prince-Bishopric of Brixen (complete list) –

- Hartwig, Prince-bishop (1027–1039)
- Poppo de Curagnoni, Prince-bishop (1039–1048)
- Altwin, Prince-bishop (1049–1097)
- Burkhard, Prince-bishop (1091–1099)
- Anto/Anzo, Prince-bishop (1097–1100)
- Hugo, Prince-bishop (1100–1125)

- Duchy of Carinthia (complete list) –

- Henry III, Duke (995–1002)
- Otto I, Duke (978–985, 1002–1004)
- Conrad I, Duke (1004–1011)
- Adalbero, Duke (1011–1035)
- Conrad II, Duke (1036–1039)
- Henry IV, Duke (1039–1047)
- Welf, Duke (1047–1055)
- Conrad III, Duke (1056–1061)
- Berthold II, Duke (1061–1077)
- Luitpold, Duke (1077–1090)
- Henry IV, Duke (1090–1122)

- Hungarian March –

- Liutpold, Margrave (1043)
- Siegfried I, Margrave (1045–1048/1065)

- Landgraviate of Sundgau –

- Otto I of Habsburg, Count (?–1046)

- March of Styria (complete list) –

- Adalbero of Eppenstein, Margrave (c.1000–1035)
- Arnold, Margrave (1035–1055)
- Godfrey, co-Margrave (1042–1050)
- Ottokar I, Margrave (1056–1075)
- Adalbero, Margrave (1075–1082)
- Ottokar II, Margrave (1082–1122)

- Prince-Bishopric of Trent (complete list) –

- Ulrich II, Prince-bishop (1027–1055)
- Azzo, Prince-bishop (1055–1065)
- Henry I, Prince-bishop (1068–1082)
- Bernard II, Prince-bishop (1082–1084)
- Adalberon, Prince-bishop (1084–1106)

== Bavarian ==
- Duchy of Bavaria (complete list) –

- Henry IV, Duke (995–1004, 1009–1017)
- Henry V, Duke (1004–1009, 1017–1026)
- Henry VI, Duke (1026–1042)
- Henry VII, Duke (1042–1047)
- Conrad I, Duke (1049–1053)
- Henry VIII, Duke (1053–1054, 1055–1061)
- Conrad II, Duke (1054–1055)
- Otto of Nordheim, Duke (1061–1070)
- Welf I, Duke (1070–1077, 1096–1101)
- Henry VIII, Duke (1077–1096)

- Prince-Abbey of Niedermünster (complete list) –

- Uda I von Kirchberg, Abbess (1002–1025)
- Heilka I von Rothenburg, Abbess (1025–1052)
- Gertrud I von Hals, Abbess (1052–1065)
- Mathilde I von Luppurg, Abbess (1065–1070)
- Heilka II von Franken, Abbess (1070–1089)
- Uda II von Marburg, Abbess (1089–1103)

- Margraviate of the Nordgau (complete list) –

- Henry of Schweinfurt, Margrave (994–1004)
- Otto of Schweinfurt, Margrave (1024–1031)
- Diepold II, Margrave (?–1078)
- Diepold III, Margrave (1093–1146)

- Pappenheim (complete list) –

- Henry I, Lord (c.1030–?)
- Henry II, Lord (late 11th century)

- Prince-Bishopric of Passau (complete list) –

- Christian, Prince-Bishop (991–1013)
- Berengar, Prince-Bishop (1013–1045)
- Egilbert, Prince-Bishop (1045–1065)
- Altmann, Prince-Bishop (1065–1091)
- Hermann of Eppenstein, counter-bishop (1085–1087)
- Ulrich, Prince-Bishop (1092–1121)

== Bohemia ==
- Duchy of Bohemia (complete list) –

- Boleslaus III the Redhead, Duke (999–1002, 1003)
- Vladivoj, Duke (1002–1003)
- Boleslaus the Brave, Duke (1003–1004)
- Jaromír, Duke (1004–1012, 1033–1034)
- Oldřich, Duke (1012–1033, 1034)
- Bretislav I, Duke (1034–1055)
- Spytihněv II, Duke (1055–1061)
- Vratislaus II, Duke (1061–1085), King (1085–1092)
- Conrad I, Duke (1092)
- Bretislaus II, Duke (1092–1100)
- Bořivoj II, Duke (1100–1107, 1117–1120)

== Burgundian-Low Countries ==
- Kingdom of Burgundy (Arles) (complete list) –

For the preceding rulers of Burgundy/Arles, see List of state leaders in the 11th century#Europe: West

- Conrad II, King (1032–1039)
- Henry III, King (1038–1056)
- Henry IV, King (1056–1105)

- Upper Burgundy (complete list) –

- Rudolph III, King (993–1032)

- County of Burgundy (complete list) –

- Otto-William, Count (982–1026), Duke (1002–1004)
- Reginald I, Count (1026–1057)
- William I the Great, Count (1057–1087)
- Reginald II, Count (1087–1097)
- William II the German, Count (1097–1125)

- Landgraviate of Brabant (complete list) –

- Godfrey I, Landgrave (1095–1139)
- Henry III, Landgrave (1085/1086–1095)
- Godfrey I, Landgrave (1095–1139)

- County of Flanders (complete list) –

- Baldwin IV the Bearded, Count (988–1037)
- Baldwin V of Lille, Count (1037–1067)
- Baldwin VI, Count (1067–1070)
- Arnulf III, Count (1070–1071)
- Robert I the Frisian, Count (1071–1093)
- Robert II, Count (1093–1111)

- County of Frisia / County of Holland (complete list) –

- Dirk III, Count (993–1039)
- Dirk IV, Count (1039–1049)
- Floris I, Count (1049–1061)
- Gertrude of Saxony, Regent (1061–1067)
- Robert, Regent (1067–?)
- Dirk V, Count (1061–1091)
- Floris II, Count (1091–1121)

- County of Hainaut (complete list) –

- Herman, Count (1039–c.1049), Count of reunited Hainaut (c.1049)
- Richilde, Countess of Hainaut, Countess (c.1050–1076)
- Baldwin I, Count (1051–1070)
- Arnulf III, Count, disputed (1070–1071)
- Baldwin II, Count (1071–c.1098)
- Baldwin III, Count (1098–1120)

- County of Limburg (complete list) –

- Waleran I, Count (1065–1082)
- Henry I, Count (1082–1119)

- Duchy of Lower Lorraine (complete list) –

- Otto, Duke (991–1012)
- Godfrey II, Duke (1012–1023)
- Gothelo I, Duke (1023–1044), of Upper Lorraine (1033–1044)
- Gothelo II, Duke (1044–1046)
- Frederick, Duke (1046–1065)
- Godfrey the Bearded, Duke (1044–1047), of Lower Lorraine (1065–1069)
- Godfrey IV, Duke (1069–1076)
- Conrad II, Duke (1076–1087)
- Godfrey V, Duke (1087–1100)

- County of Mons (complete list) –

- Reginar IV, Count (973–974, 998–1013)
- Reginar V, Count (1013–1039)
- Herman, Count (1039–c.1049), Count of reunited Hainaut (c.1049)

- County of Namur (complete list) –

- Albert I, Count (c.981–1011)
- Robert II, Count (1010–c.1018)
- Albert II, Count (c.1018–1063)
- Albert III, Count (1063–1102)

- County of Valenciennes (complete list) –

- Baldwin IV, Count (988–1035)
- Baldwin V, Count (1035–1045)

== Franconian ==
- County of Castell (complete list) –

- Rupert I, Count (1200–1223)

== Electoral Rhenish ==
- Archbishopric of Cologne (complete list) –

- Heribert, Prince-Archbishop (999–1021)
- Pilgrim, Prince-Archbishop (1021–1036)
- Hermann II, Prince-Archbishop (1036–1056)
- Anno II, Prince-Archbishop (1056–1075)
- Hildholf, Prince-Archbishop (1076–1078)
- Sigwin, Prince-Archbishop (1078–1089)
- Hermann III, Prince-Archbishop (1089–1099)
- Friedrich I, Prince-Archbishop (1100–1131)

- Prince-Bishopric of Mainz (complete list) –

- Willigis, Prince-archbishop (975–1011)
- Erkanbald, Prince-archbishop (1011–1021)
- Aribo, Prince-archbishop (1021–1031)
- Bardo, Prince-archbishop (1031–1051)
- Luitpold, Prince-archbishop (1051–1059)
- Siegfried I, Prince-archbishop (1060–1084)
- Wezilo, Prince-archbishop (1084–1088)
- Rudhart, Prince-archbishop (1088–1109)

- County Palatine of Lotharingia (complete list) –

- Ezzo, Count (996–1034)
- Otto I of Lotharingia, Count (1034–1045)
- Heinrich I of Lotharingia, Count (1045–1061)
- Hermann II of Lotharingia, Count (1061–1085)

- County Palatine of the Rhine (complete list) –

- Henry of Laach, Count (1085/1087–1095)
- Siegfried of Ballenstedt, Count (1095–1113)

- Elector-Bishopric of Trier (complete list) –

- Ludolf, Prince-bishop (994–1008)
- Megingod, Prince-bishop (1008–1015)
- Poppo von Babenberg, Prince-bishop (1016–1047)
- Eberhard, Prince-bishop (1047–1066)
- Kuno I von Wetterau, Prince-bishop (1066–1066)
- Udo von Wetterau, Prince-bishop (1066–1078)
- Egilbert, Prince-bishop (1079–1101)

== Lower Rhenish–Westphalian ==
- Duchy of Cleves (complete list) –

- Dietrich I, Count (1092–1119)

- Essen Abbey (complete list) –

- Mathilde II, Princess-Abbess (971–1011)
- Sophia, Princess-Abbess (1012–1039)
- Theophanu, Princess-Abbess (1039–1058)
- Svanhild, Princess-Abbess (1058–1085)
- Lutgarde, Princess-Abbess (c.1088–1118)

- County of Guelders (complete list) –

- Gerard I, Count (pre-1096–c.1129)

- Prince-Bishopric of Liège (complete list) –

- Notger, Prince-Bishop (972–1008)
- Baldrick II, Prince-Bishop (1008–1018)
- Wolbodo, Prince-Bishop (1018–1021)
- Durandus, Prince-Bishop (1021–1025)
- Reginard, Prince-Bishop (1025–1037)
- Nithard, Prince-Bishop (1037–1042)
- Wazo, Prince-Bishop (1042–1048)
- Theodwin, Prince-Bishop (1048–1075)
- Henry of Verdun, Prince-Bishop (1075–1091)
- Otbert, Prince-Bishop (1091–1119)

- County of Luxemburg (complete list) –

- Henry I, Count (998–1026)
- Henry II, Count (1026–1047)
- Giselbert, Count (1047–1059)
- Conrad I, Count (1059–1086)
- Henry III, Count (1086–1096)
- William I, Count (1096–1131)

- Prince-Bishopric of Utrecht (complete list) –

- Adalbold II, Prince-bishop (1024–1026)
- Bernold, Prince-bishop (1026/27–1054)
- William I (1054–1076)
- Conrad, Prince-bishop (1076–1099)
- Burchard, Prince-bishop (1100–1112)

- County of Wied (complete list) –

- Richwin IV, Count (1093–1112)
- Matfried III, Count (1093–1129)

== Upper Rhenish ==
- County of Bar (complete list) –

- Theodoric I, Count (978–1026/1027)
- Frederick II, Count (1019–1026)
- Frederick III, Count (1027–1033)
- Sophia, Countess (1033–1093), and Louis of Montbéliard, Count (1038–1071)
- Theodoric II, Count (1093–1105)

- Prince-Bishopric of Basel (complete list) –

- Ulrich II, Prince-bishop (1032–1040)
- Bruno, Prince-bishop (1040)
- Theodorich, Prince-bishop (1041–1055)
- Berengar von Wetterau, Prince-bishop (1055–1072)
- Burchard of Basle, Prince-bishop (1072–1105)

- Duchy of Upper Lorraine (complete list) –

- Theodoric I, Duke (978–c.1027)
- Frederick II, co-Duke (1019–1026)
- Frederick III, co-Duke (1026–1033)
- Gothelo the Great, Duke of Lower Lorraine (1023–1044), of Upper Lorraine (1033–1044)
- Godfrey III the Bearded, Duke (1044–1047), of Lower Lorraine (1065–1069)
- Adalbert, Duke (1047–1048)
- Gerard, Duke (1048–1070)
- Theodoric II, Duke (1070–1115)

- County of Nassau-Saarbrücken (complete list) –

- Siegbert, Count (1080–1105)

- Salm (complete list) –

- Giselbert, Count (1019–1059)
- Herman I, Count (1059–1088)
- Andrea II, Count (1088–1138)

- Prince-Bishopric of Sion (complete list) –

- Hugues, Prince-Bishop (993/4–1018/20)
- Aymon of Savoy, Prince-Bishop (1034–1053/4)
- Ermenfroi, Prince-Bishop (1054–1087-1090)
- Gausbertus, Prince-Bishop (fl.1092)

- Prince-Bishopric of Speyer (complete list) –

- Ruprecht, Prince-bishop (987–1004)
- Walter, Prince-bishop (1004–1031)
- Siegfried I, Prince-bishop (1031–1032)
- Reinher, Prince-bishop (1032–1033)
- Reginhard II of Dillingen, Prince-bishop (1033–1039)
- Sigbodo I, Prince-bishop (1039–1051)
- Arnold I of Falkenberg, Prince-bishop (1051–1056)
- Konrad I, Prince-bishop (1056–1060)
- Eginhard II of Katzenelnbogen, Prince-bishop (1060–1067)
- Heinrich of Scharfenberg, Prince-bishop (1067–1072/1073)
- Rüdiger Hutzmann, Prince-bishop (1073–1090)
- Johann I of Kraichgau, Prince-bishop (1090–1104)

- Prince-Bishopric of Strasbourg (complete list) –

- Alawich II, Prince-Bishop (999–1001)
- Werner I von Habsburg, Prince-Bishop (1001–1028)
- William I, Prince-Bishop (1028/29–1047)
- Wizelin (Hezilo), Prince-Bishop (1048–1065)
- Werner II von Achalm, Prince-Bishop (1065–1079)
- Theobald, Prince-Bishop (1079–1084)
- Otto von Büren, Prince-Bishop (1085–1100)
- Balduin, Prince-Bishop (1100)
- Kuno, Prince-Bishop (1100–1123)

- Prince-Bishopric of Worms (complete list) –

- Burchard I, Prince-bishop (1000–1025)
- Azecho, Prince-bishop (1025–1044)
- Adalgar, Prince-bishop (1044)
- Arnold I, Prince-bishop (1044–1065)
- Adalbert I von Rheinfelden, Prince-bishop (1065–1070)
- Adalbert II of Saxony, Prince-bishop (1070–1107)

== Lower Saxon ==
- Duchy of Saxony (complete list) –

- Bernard I, Duke (973–1011)
- Bernard II, Duke (1011–1059)
- Ordulf, Duke (1059–1072)
- Magnus, Duke (1072–1106

- Gandersheim Abbey (complete list) –

- Gerberga II, Princess-Abbess (949–1001)
- Sophie I, Princess-Abbess (1001–1039)
- Adelheid I, Princess-Abbess (1039–1043)
- Beatrice I, Princess-Abbess (1044–1061)
- Adelheid II, Princess-Abbess (1061–1096)
- Adelheid III, Princess-Abbess (1096–1104)

- Obotrites (complete list) –

- Mstislav, Prince (996–1018)
- Udo, Prince (1018–1028)
- Ratibor, Prince (1028–1043)
- Gottschalk, Prince (1043–1066)
- Budivoj, Prince (1066, 1069)
- Kruto, Prince (1066-1069, 1069-1093)
- Henry, Prince (1093–1127)

== Upper Saxon ==
- County of Anhalt (complete list) –

- Esico, Count (c.1030–1060)
- Adalbert, Count (1060–1076/83)
- Otto I the Rich, Count (1076/83–1123)

- Eastern March (complete list) –

- Gero II, Margrave (993–1015)
- Thietmar, Margrave (1015–1030)
- Odo II, Margrave (1030–1046)
- Bolesław I of Poland, Margrave (1002–1025)
- Mieszko II of Poland, Margrave (1025–1031)
- Dedi I, Margrave (1046–1075)
- Dedi II, Margrave (fl.1069)
- Henry I, Margrave (1075–1103)

- Margravate of Meissen (complete list) –

- Eckard I, Margrave (985–1002)
- Gunzelin, Margrave (1002–1009)
- Herman I, Margrave (1009–1031)
- Eckard II, Margrave (1031–1046)
- William, Margrave (1046–1062)
- Otto I, Margrave (1062–1067)
- Egbert I, Margrave (1067–1068)
- Egbert II, Margrave (1068–1089)
- Vratislaus II of Bohemia, Margrave (1076–1089)
- Henry I, Margrave (1089–1103)

- Northern March (complete list) –

- Lothair I, Margrave (983–1003)
- Werner, Margrave (1003–1009)
- Bernard, Margrave (1009–1051)
- William, Margrave (1051–1056)
- Otto, Margrave (1056–1057)
- Lothair Udo I, Margrave (1056–1057)
- Lothair Udo II, Margrave (1057–1082)
- Henry I the Long, Margrave (1082–1087)
- Lothair Udo III, Margrave (1087–1106)

- Duchy of Pomerania (complete list) –

- Siemomysł, non-dynastic Duke (post–1000–1046)
- Świętobor, non-dynastic Duke (1060–1106)

- Duchy of Pomerelia (complete list) –

- Świętobor, Duke (c.1100)

- Duchy of Thuringia (complete list) –

- Eckard I, Duke (1000–1002)
- William II, Duke (1002–1003)
- Louis the Bearded, Landgrave (1031–1056)
- William IV, Duke (1046–1062)
- Louis the Springer, Count (1056–1123)
- Otto, Duke (1062–1067)
- Egbert II, Duke (1067–1090)

== Swabian ==
- Duchy of Swabia (complete list) –

- Herman II, Duke (997–1003)
- Herman III, Duke (1003–1012)
- Ernest I, Duke (1012–1015)
- Ernest II, Duke (1015–1030)
- Herman IV, Duke (1030–1038)
- Henry I, Duke (1038–1045)
- Otto II, Duke (1045–1048)
- Otto III, Duke (1048–1057)
- Rudolf I, Duke (1057–1079)
- Berthold I, contested Duke (1079–1090)
- Berthold II, contested Duke (1092–1098)
- Frederick I, contested Duke (1079–1105)

- Prince-Bishopric of Augsburg (complete list) –

- Siegfried I, Prince-bishop (1001–1006)
- Bruno, Prince-bishop (1006–1029)
- Eberhard I, Prince-bishop (1029–1047)
- Henry II, Prince-bishop (1047–1063)
- Embrico, Prince-bishop (1063–1077)
- Wigolt, Prince-bishop (1077–1088)
- Siegfried II, Prince-bishop (1088–1096)
- Hermann of Vohburg, Prince-bishop (1096–1133)

- Margraviate of Baden (complete list) –

- Herman II, Margrave (1073–1130)

- Ellwangen Abbey (complete list) –

- Ruadhoc, Prince-abbot (c.1020)
- Berengar, Prince-abbot (?–1028)
- Otbert, Prince-abbot (?–1035)
- Richard, Prince-abbot (1035–?)
- Arn, Prince-abbot (1046–1052 (1061?))
- Reginger, Prince-abbot (1061–1076?)
- Udo, Prince-abbot (1076–1082?)
- Isambert, Prince-abbot (c.1090)
- Adalger, Prince-abbot (c.1100)

- Princely Abbey of Kempten (complete list) –

- Otenus, Prince-abbot (1062–1064)
- Heinrich I Dornstich of Alt-Ravensburg, Prince-abbot (1064–1073)
- Konrad II Neubrunner, Prince-abbot (1073–1075)
- Adalbert II, Prince-abbot (1078–1089)
- Eberhard II, Prince-abbot (1089–1092)
- Ulrich II Lindagrun of Ochsenbach, Prince-abbot (1092–1094)
- Eberhard III, Prince-abbot (1094–1105)

- County of Württemberg (complete list) –

- Conrad I, Count (pre-1081–1110)

== Italy ==
- Kingdom of Italy (complete list) –

Ottonian dynasty
- Otto III, King (996–1002)
- Arduin of Ivrea, King (1002–1014)
- Henry II, King (1004–1024)
Salian dynasty
- Conrad II (Holy Roman Emperor), King (1026–1039)
- Henry III, King (1039–1056)
- Henry IV, King (1056–1105)
- Conrad II of Italy, King (1093–1098)
- Henry V, King (1098–1125)

- March of Istria –

- Poppo I, Margrave (1012–1044)
- Ulric I, Margrave (1060–1070), son of Margrave Poppo I, also Margrave of Carniola
- Henry I, Margrave (1077–1090)
- Engelbert I, Margrave (1090–1096)
- Burchard, Margrave (1093–1101)
- Poppo II, Margrave (1096–1098)
- Ulric II, Margrave (1098–1107)

- March of Montferrat (complete list) –

- William III, Margrave (991–1042)

- County of Orange (complete list) –

- Raimbaut I, Count (?)
- Bertrand Raimbaut, Count (c.1062)

- Papal States (complete list) –

- Sylvester II, Pope (999–1003)
- John XVII, Pope (1003)
- John XVIII, Pope (1003–1009)
- Sergius IV, Pope (1009–1012)
- Benedict VIII, Pope (1012–1024)
- John XIX, Pope (1024–1032)
- Benedict IX, Pope (1032–1044)
- Sylvester III, Pope (1045)
- Benedict IX, Pope (1045)
- Gregory VI, Pope (1045–1046)
- Clement II, Pope (1046–1047)
- Benedict IX, Pope (1047–1048)
- Damasus II, Pope (1048)
- Leo IX, Pope (1049–1054)
- Victor II, Pope (1055–1057)
- Stephen IX, Pope (1057–1058)
- Nicholas II, Pope (1058–1061)
- Alexander II, Pope (1061–1073)
- Gregory VII, Pope (1073–1085)
- Victor III, Pope (1086–1087)
- Urban II, Pope (1088–1099)
- Paschal II, Pope (1099–1118)

- Republic of Venice (complete list) –

- Pietro II Orseolo, Doge (991–1009)

- County of Savoy (complete list) –

- Humbert I the White-Handed, Count (1003–1047/48)
- Amadeus I of the Tail, Count (1030/48–1051/56)
- Otto I, Count (1051/56–1060)
- Peter I, Count (1060–1078)
- Amadeus II, Count (1078–1080)
- Humbert II the Fat, Count (1082/91–1103)

- March of Tuscany (complete list) –

- Hugh, Margrave (961–1001)
- Boniface, Margrave (1004–1011)
- Rainier, Margrave (1014–1027)
- Boniface III, Margrave (1027–1052)
- Frederick, Margrave (1052–1055)
- Godfrey III, Margrave (1065–1069)
- Godfrey IV, Margrave (1069–1076)
- Matilda, Margravine (1076–1115)
