= Òbalíke =

Eze Nri Òbalíke
- Eze Nri
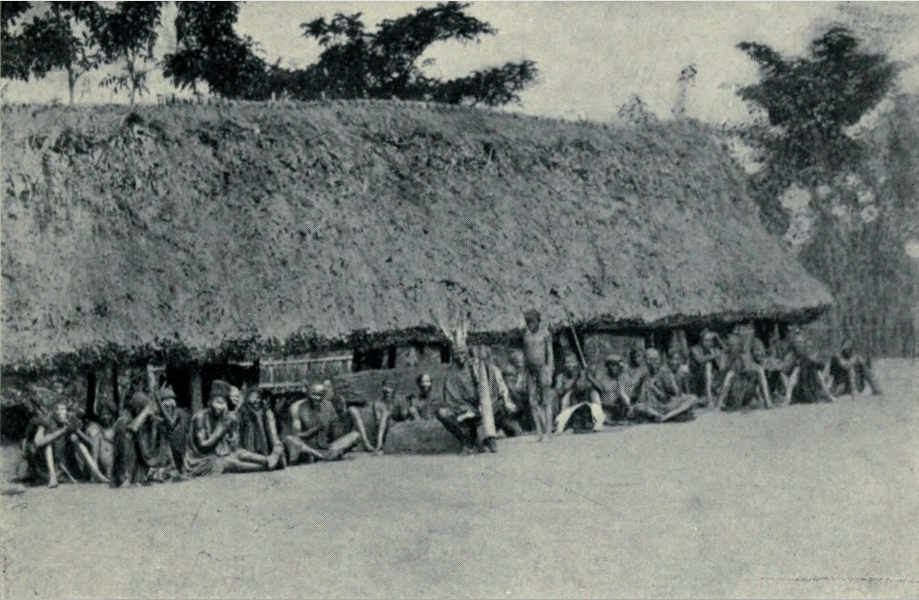
- Photo taken by Northcote W. Thomas in 1910 as Obalike sounds his bell
- Reign: 1889–1936
- Born: Uruọji

Eze Nri Òbalíke is the 15th recorded Eze Nri of the Kingdom of Nri in modern-day southeastern Nigeria. He is said to have ruled from around the year 1889 till 1936.

== History ==
=== Nomination as Eze Nri ===
Obalike mentioned a dream as central to his candidacy, as signs were supposedly given to the next Eze Nri spiritually, he is quoted saying:

One night Enwelana, the last Eze Nri, appeared to him and said he was the chosen man; thereupon he proceeded to offer sacrifices.

=== British rule ===
Accompanied by British colonial authority, Christian missionaries, saw the existing ritual system of administration, based on traditional religious faith, as a barrier to the spread of their gospel. When the British continued to take over the administration of the Igbo in 1907, both the forces of the colonial authority and the Christian missionaries focused on destroying the Nri traditional authority. Military attempts to capture Nri and the Eze Nri ended in complete failure. However, forcing Eze Nri Obalike, against a long-standing tradition, to leave Nri town to attend the native at Awka by threatening to commit genocide against the Igbos, was one of the acts designed to achieve this end. Eze Nri Obalike agreed to leave Nri in order to save innocent lives. The government anthropologist, Northcote W. Thomas, confirmed that when Eze Nri Obalike appeared in the court, ‘the whole assembly rose and prepared to flee’. This is because, that was the first time an Eze Nri was seen in person.

The final act of destruction, after the British introduced the warrant Chief system in 1911, was to force all chiefs and community leaders to denounce the Eze Nri. But before then, Eze Nri Obalike was also forced to annul all codes of taboo and abomination still binding the towns to Nri. It was as the result of this hostility that the ritual influence of Nri narrowed to the nearest relations of the kingship. These were made up of Nri (Agukwu, Akamkpisi and Diodo), Enugwu-Ukwu, Nawfia, Enugwu-Agidi and Oruora jointly referred to as Umunri. Though the five towns mentioned above are said to belong to Umu-Nri clan, they are not direct descendants of Nri Ifikuanim.

Regnal titles
Preceded by Eze Nri Ènweleána I	Eze Nri; 17 November 1889 – 1936	Succeeded by Eze Nri Jiọfọ II Taabansi Udene
