= Taifa of Alpuente =

Coordinates: 39.8778°N 1.0139°W

- 1009–1106
- Taifa Kingdom of Alpuente, c. 1037.
- Capital: Alpuente, now in Valencia, Land of Valencia, Spain
- Common languages: Arabic, Mozarabic, Hebrew
- Religion: Islam, Christianity (Roman Catholicism), Judaism
- Government: Monarchy
- Historical era: Middle Ages
  - Downfall of Caliphate of Córdoba: 1009
  - Conquered by the Almoravids: 1106
- Currency: Dirham and Dinar
Preceded by	Succeeded by
Caliphate of Cordoba	Almoravids

The Taifa of Alpuente (Arabic: طائفة ألبونت) was a medieval taifa kingdom, of Berber origin, that existed from around 1009 to 1106 created following the end of the Caliphate of Córdoba in the Iberian Peninsula in 1010. It was centered at the city of Alpuente. It was ruled by a Berber family of the Banu Qasim tribe.

== List of Emirs ==
=== Qasimid dynasty ===
- 'Abd Allah I: c. 1009–1030
- Muhammad I Yumn ad-Dawla: 1030–1042
- Ahmad b Muhammad 'Izz (o Adud) al-Dawla: 1042–1043
- Muhammad II: 1043
- 'Abd Allah II: 1043–c. 1106

== See also ==
- List of Sunni Muslim dynasties
