= Ìfikuánim =

Eze Nri Ìfikuánim
- Eze Nri
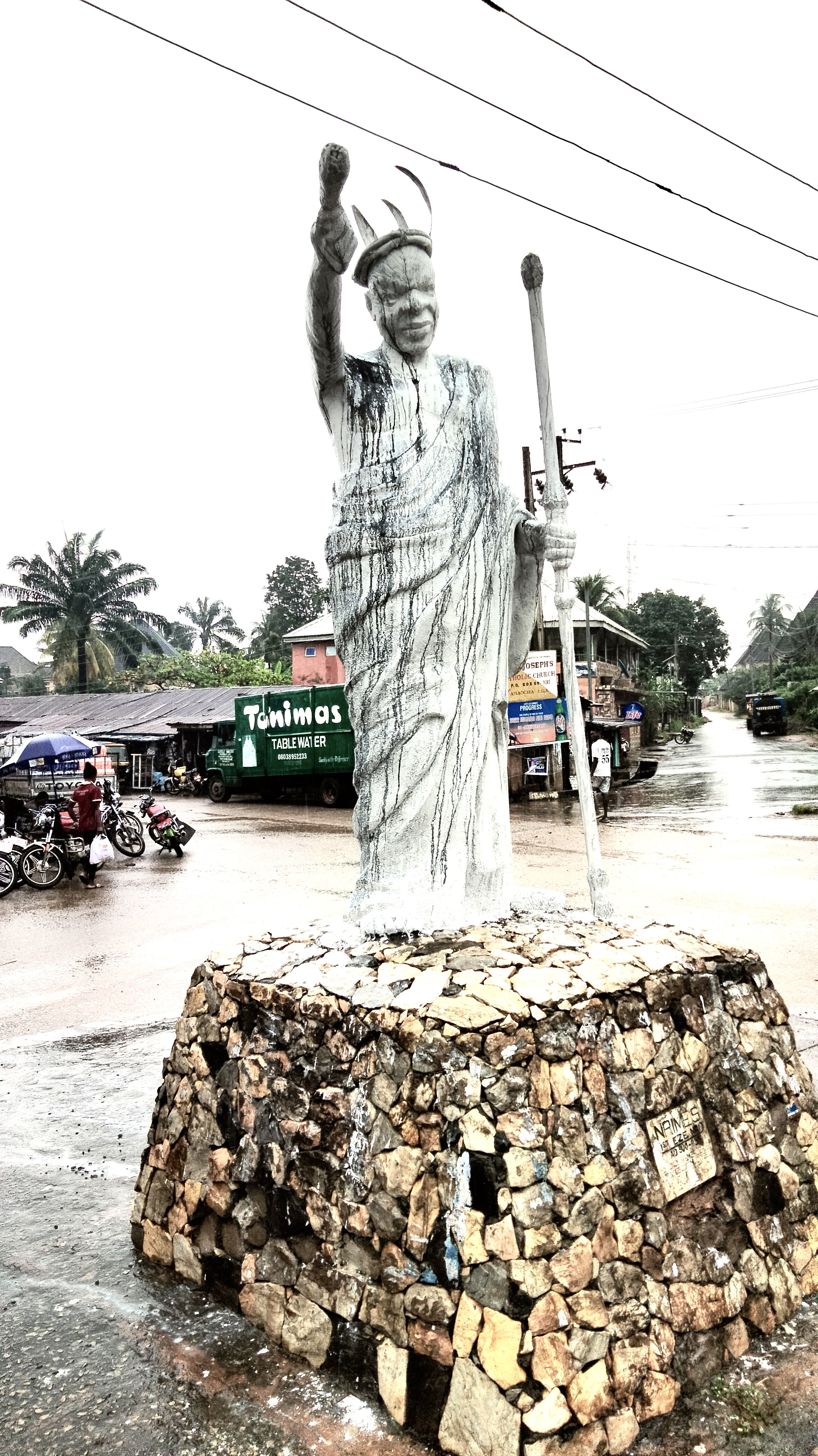
- Statue of Ifikuanim I
- Reign: 1043–1089
- Predecessor: none
- Successor: Eze Nri Nàmóke
- Father: Eri

Eze Nri Ìfikuánim was the first king of the Nri Kingdom. According to Igbo oral tradition, his reign started in 1043, although at least one historian puts Ìfikuánim's reign much later, around 1225 AD.

== History ==
Eze Nri Ifikuanim was the first King and Priest-King of the Nri Kingdom. He was said to be highly intelligent and traded with other kingdoms including Egypt, Ethiopia, India and Babylon. He founded the kingdom and created the capital city of Igbo-Ukwu. He controlled a number of settlements around Nri such as Enugu-ukwu, Nneofia, Enugu Agidi, Nimo, Nibo, Nisi and Agulu. He insisted that settlements live in peace and created rules for maintaining that peace. He introduced new types of yam which he had brought from a neighboring village and made Nri men distribute them across the various settlements. He also established the Agabala Nri oracle, which was believed to bring health and prosperity to those who needed it. In oral history, it was believed that Nri Ifikuanim had control over the elements, diseases, insect pests, trading activities and fertility across the region. Nri Ifikuanim was said to have gained these powers from his father, Eri. Ifikuanim had many children and the principal ones who stayed in Nri founded the present three maximal lineages of Agukwu.

=== Later Reign ===
Before Nri Ifikuanim died, he proclaimed that only the youngest sons could take the Nri title after him.

=== Post-Death ===
After the death of Nri Ifikuanim, chaos erupted in the kingdom that slowed the development of the settlement, Agukwu.

== Administration ==
Ifikuanim was known to bey a key-administrator. He led to the adopting of the term Ozo by Nri men who were leaders of key settlements. Which were similar to the Nri title but were very much lower in rank to it. From oral tradition, his father gave him powers and revealed the secrets of the "Mystical World" and gave to him two sets of paraphernalia called Nri Menri. The first set were of two staffs called Ofo Nri and Alo Nri. The second set consisted of objects made out of bronze, iron, and clay.

Regnal titles
Preceded by none	Eze Nri; 1043 – 1158	Succeeded by Eze Nri Nàmóke
