= List of rulers of Nri =

List of rulers of the Igbo kingdom of Nri

The following is a list of rulers of Nri. The title of the ruler of Nri is Eze Nri. He held religious and political authority over the Kingdom of Nri.

The Nri culture is believed to stretch back to at least the 13th century, with a traditional foundation by Eri dated 948. The 15th recorded Eze Nri, Òbalíke, was deposed by the British administration in favour of the "warrant chief" system, but the title continued to be held; the current Eze Nri, Ènweleána II Obidiegwu Onyeso, was instated in 1988.

== Selection ==
The eze Nri was chosen by the Nze and Nzemabua (state leadership) and had to be recognized by the general public. Before being crowned, he could not have a living father. The potential eze Nri also had to prove he was the choice of God (Chukwu), Eri (founder of Nri), the ancestors ("ndiichie") and spirits (alusi) through revelations and visions confirmed by diviners. After this, must travel to Aguleri to obtain a lump of clay from the bottom of Omambalathe Anambra River. The clay is used to make the ritual pot (odudu) for the shrine to Nri Menri. After various other rituals such as causing the magical ripening of a fruit palm and undergoing a ritual burial and reviving, the eze Nri was proclaimed and saluted as igwe (meaning "heavenly one").

== List of recorded Eze Nri ==
It is difficult to trace the exact dates for an individual eze Nri, because there was an interregnum after each one's death. During this time, the priests of the eze Nri waited for someone to manifest the signs indicating they were the next priest-king. The following list is based entirely on Igbo Civilization: Nri Kingdom & Hegemony by M. Angulu Onwuejeogwu (1981).

Name	Portrait	Birth	Marriage(s)	Death
Eri; 948-1041				
Eze Nri Ìfikuánim; 1043–1089				
Eze Nri Nàmóke; 1090–1158		Diodo		
Eze Nri Buífè; 1159–1259		Obeagụ Unified Ọfọ N’alọ Agukwu and Diodo		
Eze Nri Ọmalọ; 1260–1299		Uruọji		
Eze Nri Jiọfọ I 1300–1390		Uruọji		
Eze Nri Ọmalonyeso; 1391–1464		Obeagu		
Eze Nri Anyamata; 1465–1511		Uruọji		
Eze Nri Fenenu; 1512–1582		Agbadana		
Eze Nri Agụ; 1583–1676		Obeagu		
Eze Nri Apia and Nri–Alike; 1677–1700		Both from Uruọji		Both died the same day
Eze Nri Ezimilo; 1701–1723		Agbadana		Assassinated
Eze Nri Èwenétem; 1724–1794		Agbadana		
Eze Nri Ènweleána I 1795–1886		Obeagu		
Eze Nri Òbalíke; 1889–1936		Uruoji		
Eze Nri Jiọfọ II Taabansi Udene; 1937–1979		Agbadana		
Eze Nri Ènweleána II Obidiegwu Onyeso (MFR); 1988-current		Obeagu		

== See also ==
- Kingdom of Nri
- Eze
- Igbo-Ukwu
- Nigerian traditional rulers
- List of Igbo Nnewi monarchs
