= House of Toulouse =

Historic rulers in southern France

House of Toulouse Raimondines House of Rouergue House of Saint-Gilles
- Arms of the Count of Toulouse
- Parent house: House of Rouergue
- Country: County of Toulouse; Marquisate of Provence; County of Tripoli
- Founded: 849
- Founder: Fredelo, Count of Toulouse
- Final ruler: Joan, Countess of Toulouse
- Titles: Prince of Galilee; Duke of Narbonne; Marquis of Provence; Count of Carcassonne; Count of Rouergue; Count of Toulouse; Count of Tripoli; Count of Melgueil
- Estates: Rouergue, Toulouse, Tripoli
- Dissolution: 1271
- Cadet branches: House of Limoges; House of Tripoli

The House of Toulouse, sometimes called House of Saint-Gilles or Raimondines, is a family of Frankish origin established in Languedoc that owned the County of Toulouse. Its first representative was Fulcoald of Rouergue, who died after 837. His sons Fredelo and Raymond I were the first hereditary counts of Toulouse from 849 to 863. The last holder of the county in the agnatic line was Raymond VII who died in 1249. This family therefore reigned over the county for four centuries.

== History ==
=== Creation of the County of Toulouse ===
The county of Toulouse is a former county in southern France, the holder of which was one of six primitive lay peers.

A count of Toulouse was appointed in 778 by Charlemagne in favor of a certain Torson, following the defeat of Roncesvalles, to coordinate the defense and the fight against the Basques, and integrated into the duchy of Aquitaine, when it was created three years later: William the Pious, Duke of Aquitaine, had the title of Count of Toulouse. From the death in 852 of Fredelo son of Fulcoald, count of Rouergue and Senegund of Toulouse, who was governor (custos civitas) of Toulouse, Pailhars, Rodez, and Limoges, the center of Aquitaine moves to Poitiers and Count of Rouergue, were also rulers of Toulouse.

Starting with Fulcoald of Rouergue, the County of Toulouse became hereditary. His son Fredelo becomes Count of Toulouse in 849. His brother Raymond I succeeded him in 852.

=== The House of Toulouse ===
From the ninth century, the House of Toulouse was established in its fief. The elder line of the House of Rouergue became Counts of Toulouse. The functions of the Marquis of Gothia and Duke of Narbonne, which they also possessed, became empty and meaningless titles which were transmitted to the younger branch of Rouergue. At the death of the Countess Bertha of Rouergue, these titles were inherited by a scion of the senior line, Raymond, Count of Saint-Gilles, which allowed him to be an early territorial power. Pons, Count of Toulouse, father of Raymond of Saint Gilles, bequeathed all his possessions to his eldest son William, on the condition that if William were to die without a son, the properties would then pass to Raymond. Hence, when William IV died, Raymond succeeded his brother as Raymond IV of Toulouse, although the succession was claimed by Philippa, William IV's daughter, who married William IX, Duke of Aquitaine. Raymond of Saint-Gilles managed to establish the principality as a power, which he gave to his son Bertrand, after departing for the First Crusade.

Bertrand, with his brother Alfonso Jordan, must fight against the Duke of Aquitaine, who seized Toulouse several times, but had to evacuate each time due to popular revolt. Then the counts of Toulouse fought against the Counts of Barcelona as they competed for expanding their influence in Languedoc and Provence. Peace was finally concluded in the second half of the 12th century. At that time, the city of Toulouse is one of the largest in Europe, and the House of Toulouse reigned over a rich and powerful territory. The counts of Toulouse, who played a significant part in the Crusades, also possessed the County of Tripoli in the Holy Land.

=== Fall ===
In the 12th century, a new heresy, Catharism, developed in the region, supported by many local lords. Count Raymond V demanded the aid of Cîteaux to fight against the Cathars, but in the early 13th century, their presence is such that Raymond VI cannot fight against them without alienating a large part of the population. The murder of the papal legate Pierre de Castelnau triggered the Albigensian Crusade. Launched in 1208 by Pope Innocent III, it aimed to crush heresy and to subdue the powerful lords of the south and their wealthy domains. In 1215, Simon de Montfort, who took the leadership of the Crusade, defeated the army of Toulouse and entered the city. He proclaimed himself Count of Toulouse but was killed in 1218 by the inhabitants. After this event, the counts of Toulouse sided with the people against the royal armies. But after a new offensive launched by King Louis VIII, Raymond VII gave in and signed the Treaty of Meaux in 1229.

The repression against the Cathars increased and the County of Toulouse gradually passed under the domination of royal power. Joan of Toulouse, daughter of Raymond VII, married Alphonse of Poitiers, brother of St. Louis. As Count of Toulouse, Alphonse administered the city from Paris. In 1271, the county of Toulouse merged into the crown as an inheritance of Philip III, King of France, nephew of Alphonse.

== Genealogy and descendants of the House of Toulouse ==
- Fulcoald of Rouergue
  - Fredelo, Count of Toulouse
  - Raymond I, Count of Toulouse
    - Bernard II, Count of Toulouse
    - Fulgaud, viscount of Limoges
      - House of Limoges
    - Odo, Count of Toulouse
      - Raymond II, Count of Toulouse
        - Raymond Pons, Count of Toulouse
          - Raymond III, Count of Toulouse
            - Raymond (IV), Count of Toulouse
              - William III, Count of Toulouse
                - Raymond
                - Hugh
                - Pons, Count of Toulouse
                  - William IV, Count of Toulouse
                  - Raymond IV, Count of Toulouse
                    - Bertrand, Count of Toulouse (questionable legitimacy)
                      - Pons, Count of Tripoli
                        - Raymond II, Count of Tripoli
                          - Raymond III, Count of Tripoli
                    - Alfonso Jordan
                      - Raymond V, Count of Toulouse
                        - Raymond VI, Count of Toulouse
                          - Raymond VII, Count of Toulouse
                            - Joan, Countess of Toulouse
                          - Bertrand (illegitimate)
                            - Viscounts of Bruniquel
                        - Aubri
                        - Baldwin
                      - Alfonso
                  - Hugh, Abbot of Saint-Gilles
                - Bertrand
      - Ermengol of Rouergue
        - Raymond II of Rouergue
          - Raymond III of Rouergue
            - Hugh of Rouergue
              - Bertha of Rouergue
          - Hugh, Bishop of Toulouse
        - Hugh, Count of Quercy
    - Aribert, abbot of Vabres

=== The Counts of Rouergue ===
From 852, the County of Toulouse is the possession of the counts of Rouergue, and transmitted hereditarily.

=== The Counts of Toulouse ===
The Counts of Rouergue settled their capital in Toulouse. The senior line became Counts of Toulouse while a cadet branch retained the County of Rouergue.

=== The Counts of Tripoli ===
During the Crusades, Raymond of Saint-Gilles established the county of Tripoli. It remained in the family until 1187, when it passed to the House of Antioch.

=== Toulouse-Bruniquel ===
The last agnatic descendant of the Counts of Toulouse, of the "Raymondine" branch, died on 13 August 1577 in the person of Jean Antoine, Viscount of Montclar and Baron of Salvagnac. A Protestant captain, he was killed by Catholics in a skirmish in the countryside. He belonged to a cadet branch descended from Bertrand of Toulouse, Viscount of Bruniquel and natural son of Raymond VI.

=== Toulouse-Lautrec ===
According to a genealogy established in the 17th century, this family is considered a branch of the House of Toulouse descended from Baldwin, son of Raymond V of Toulouse, which they represented in their coat of arms. According to recent research, the Toulouse-Lautrec would be agnatic descendants of the viscounts of Lautrec, a line which could be traced back to the end of the ninth century, which would also be the origin of the Trencavel

=== The House of Limoges ===
Second son of Raymond I, Count of Toulouse, Foucher of Limoges founded the House of Limoges in 876 that ruled Limoges until 1139.

== Arms ==
Arms of the House of Toulouse

Count of Toulouse: Gules a cross clechy pommety and voided or

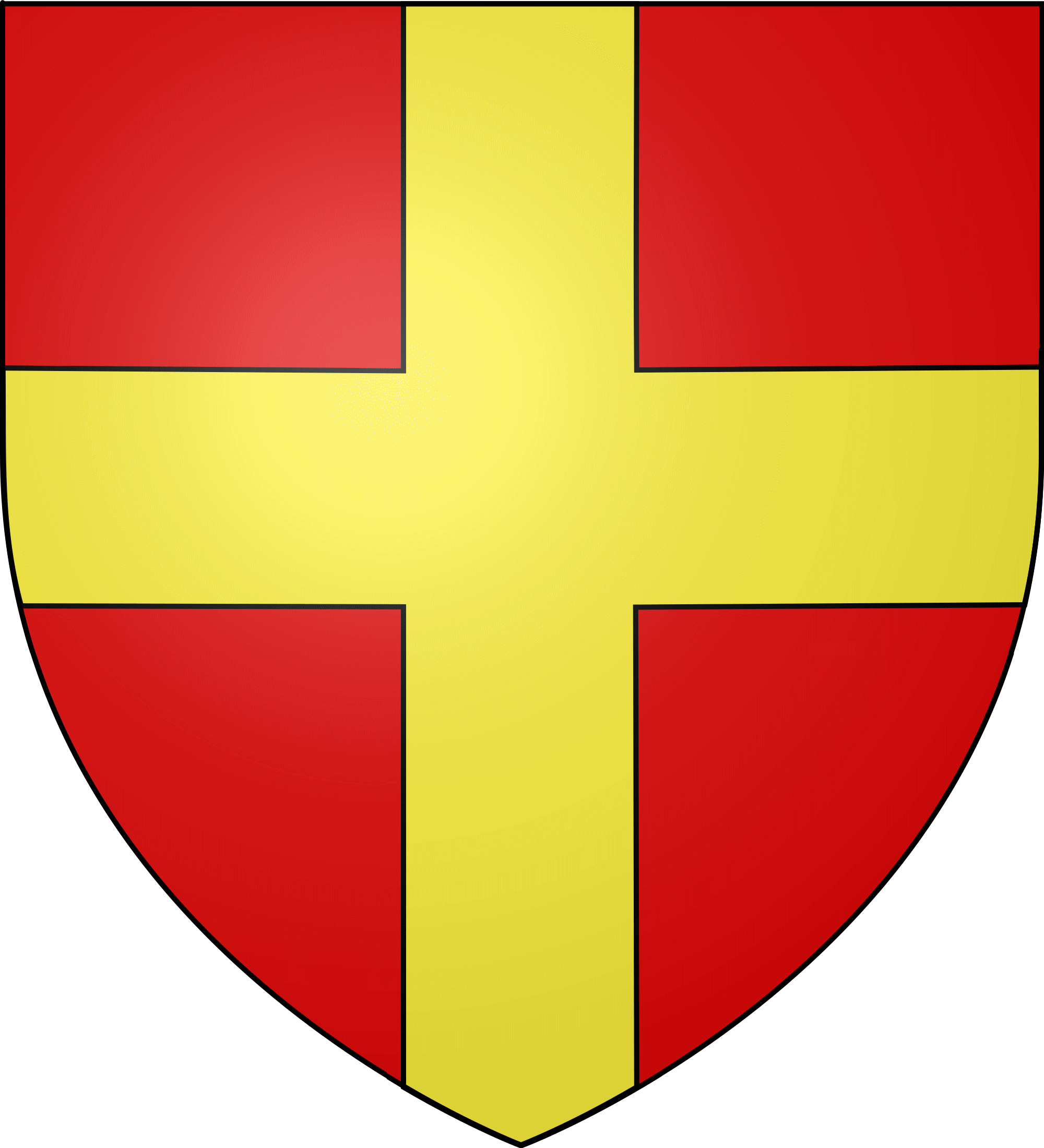
Count of Tripoli: Gules a cross or

Viscount of Limoges: Or three lions azure armed and langued gules
