= Battle of Salvetat =

- Part of Albigensian Crusade
Location	Saint-Jory
Result	Toulouse victory

Belligerents
Kingdom of France; Crusaders	County of Toulouse

Commanders and leaders
Simon de Montfort	Raymond VI

The Battle of Salvetat was a battle fought in September 11-12, 1217 during the Albigensian Crusade. It was between Raymond VI of Toulouse and Bernard IV of Comminges against the crusaders of Simon de Montfort and it happened near the present-day Saint-Jory.

== Background ==
In November 1215 the Fourth Lateran Council took place and Simon de Montfort was recognized as Count of Toulouse, where he justified his massacres of the local population. Raymond VI who was exiled to Catalonia after the Battle of Muret, was stripped of all his property and titles.

In 1216, at the court of Paris, Simon de Montfort paid homage to Philip II of France as Duke of Narbonne, Count of Toulouse and Viscount of Béziers and Carcassonne. The same year, a revolt broke out in Languedoc led by the son of the Occitan count: Raymond VII, who won the Siege of Beaucaire, the first Occitan victory.

== Battle ==
The troops of Simon de Montfort attempted to cross the Garonne at Saint-Jory, where they were held by the Croats, inferior in number and commanded by Joris, an Occitan noble loyal to Simon de Montfort, who intended to block their passage to Toulouse, until the arrival of Ramon VI of Toulouse with the bulk of the troops, who defeated the Croats, suffering some casualties.
