= County of Toulouse =

Feudal monarchy in southern France (778–1271)

County of Toulouse Comitatus Tolosanus (Latin) Comtat de Tolosa (Occitan) Conté de Thoulouse (Middle French)
- 778–1271
- Banner of arms of the count of Toulouse Arms of the counts of Toulouse, 13th century

- Languedoc at the beginning of the Albigensian Crusade Dark Green: Lands belonging to the House of Toulouse Green: Vassal lands Yellow: Limits of Trencavel demesne
- Capital: Toulouse
- Common languages: Medieval Latin; Old Occitan
- Religion: Roman Catholicism (official); Catharism
- Government: Feudal monarchy
- Count of Toulouse
  - 778–790: Corso
  - 1247–1271: Anfós de Peitieus
- Historical era: France in the Middle Ages
  - Established by Charlemagne: 778
  - Acquired by the French Kingdom: 1271
- Currency: Tolosan; Dener; Melgorés; Sol
Preceded by
Gothic March
Succeeded by
Kingdom of France
Comtat Venaissin
County of Ribagorza
- Today part of: France

The County of Toulouse (Occitan: Comtat de Tolosa, Latin: Comitatus Tolosanus, Middle French: Conté de Thoulouse) was a territory in present-day southern France consisting of the city of Toulouse and its environs, ruled by the Count of Toulouse from the late 9th century until the late 13th century.

After Pippin the Short conquered Septimania, his successor Charlemagne imposed an administration where Frankish counts were established in key cities such as Toulouse. The first count, Fredelo (appointed by Pippin II) ruled the Toulouse region under the sovereignty of the king of Francia in the 840s. Over time his descendants gained more power over the region compared to their Frankish overlord; by the end of the 9th century, they had gained total independence. Later in the 12th century, the county was affected by the Albigensian Crusade, and by 1229, the Treaty of Paris saw Toulouse formally submitted to the crown of France, ending its independence. But the counts of Toulouse ruled Toulouse town and the surrounding county until 1271.

== History ==
=== Formation of administration under the early Carolingians ===
The Roman province of Gallia Narbonensis fell to the Visigothic Kingdom in the 5th century. Septimania, the Visigothic province roughly corresponding to the later county of Toulouse, fell briefly to the Emirate of Córdoba in the 750s before it was conquered into Francia by Pippin the Short in 759 following the Siege of Narbonne. Septimania within the Frankish realm would become known as Gothia or Marca Gothica by the end of the 9th century.

Pippin died in 768 and was followed by his sons Charlemagne and Carloman I. Because of this event, Hunald II, son of the late Duke Waifer, raised an insurrection against Frankish power in Aquitaine. Charlemagne soon intervened and defeated him. In 771, Carloman died and Charlemagne was left as the only ruler of the Frankish realm. In 778, Charlemagne led his army into Spain against the Arabs. On his way back the famous event of Roncesvalles (Roncevaux in French) occurred: Charlemagne's rear-guard was attacked in the pass of the same name by some Basque warriors. This led him to realize that Frankish power in Gascony and Aquitaine was still feeble, and that the local populations were not entirely loyal to the Franks. Consequently, that same year, he completely reorganized the administration of the region: direct Frankish administration was imposed, and Frankish counts were established in key cities, such as Toulouse.

In 781, Charlemagne set up the Kingdom of Aquitaine, comprising the whole of Aquitaine (including Gascony) plus the Mediterranean coast from Narbonne to Nîmes (an area then known as Gothia). Other such sub-kingdoms were created inside the wider Carolingian Empire in places such as Bavaria or Lombardy. They were meant to ensure the loyalty of local populations in territories freshly conquered and with strong local idiosyncrasies.

General supervision of this Basque frontier seems to have been placed in the hands of Chorson, count or duke of Toulouse. These politics displeased the Basques, and in 787 or 789 Chorson was captured by Odalric "the Basque", probably son of Duke Lupus, who forced Chorson into an agreement which Charlemagne considered so shameful that he replaced him by the Count William in 790. Toulouse was a major Carolingian military stronghold close to Muslim Spain. Military campaigns against the Muslims were launched from Toulouse almost every year during Charlemagne's reign. Barcelona was conquered in 801, as well as a large part of Catalonia. Together with the northern areas of Aragon and Navarre along the Pyrenees, the region became the southern march (the Spanish March) of the Frankish empire.

=== Toulouse under the sons of Charlemagne ===
In 814, Charlemagne died, and his only surviving son was Louis, king of Aquitaine, who became Emperor Louis the Pious. Gothia was detached from the Kingdom of Aquitaine and administered directly by the emperor. Problems soon arose. Louis the Pious had three sons, and in 817 he arranged an early allocation of the shares in the future inheritance of the empire where Pippin was confirmed king in Aquitaine.

In 823, Charles the Bald was born from the second wife of Louis the Pious which caused a succession crisis among the ruling circle, this eventually led to the decentralization of the Frankish empire. War broke out among the sons of Louis the Pious when the latter died in 840. Louis the German allied with his half-brother Charles the Bald and they jointly defeated Lothar. The empire would split under the Treaty of Verdun in 843. Charles the Bald moved south to defeat Pippin II (son of Pippin I who was son of Louis) and add Aquitaine to his territory. He conquered Gothia from its rebellious count, who had taken advantage of the Carolingian feud, and had him executed.

In 844, he moved west and besieged Toulouse, the capital of King Pippin II of Aquitaine. However, he had to withdraw without being able to capture the city. That same year, the Vikings entered the mouth of the Garonne River, took Bordeaux, and sailed up as far as Toulouse, plundering and killing all along the Garonne River valley. They moved back when they reached Toulouse, without attacking the city. It is still a matter of debate among historians whether they were called by Pippin II in his fight against Charles the Bald (as Charles' propaganda later claimed), helped defeat Charles the Bald, and left with due payment from Pippin II of Aquitaine, or whether they just took advantage of the war to invade unchecked, but moved back at the sight of the strong garrison of Toulouse who had just resisted successfully Charles the Bald.

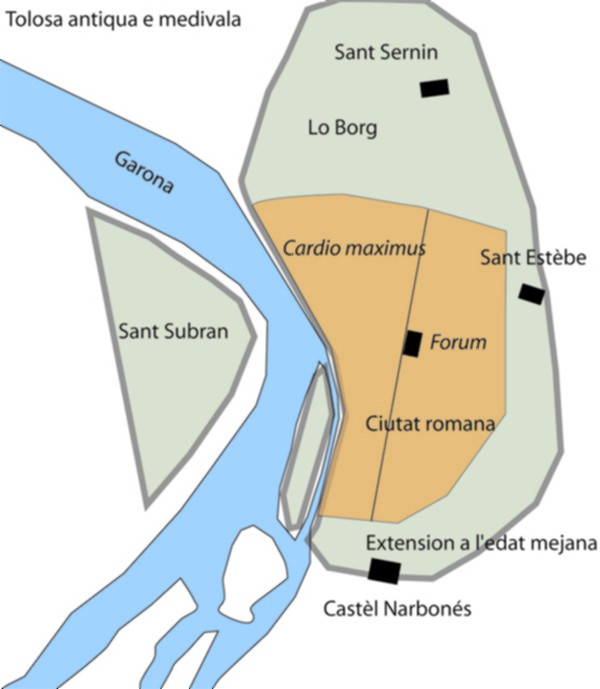
The town in early Middle Ages

In 845, following these events, Charles the Bald signed a treaty recognizing Pippin II as king of Aquitaine in exchange for him relinquishing the northern part of Aquitaine (the county of Poitiers) to Charles the Bald. However, the Aquitanians grew very unhappy with their king Pippin II, perhaps for his friendliness towards the Vikings who inflicted terrible damage on the population, and so in 848 they called Charles the Bald to topple Pippin II.

=== Counts of Toulouse gains power over the Carolingians ===
In 849, Charles the Bald moved south again and was presented the capital of Aquitaine, Toulouse, by Fredelo (the count of Toulouse recently appointed by Pippin II). Charles the Bald then officially confirmed Frédelon as count of Toulouse. Soon the whole of Aquitaine was submitting to Charles the Bald. In 852, Pippin II was taken prisoner by the Basques and handed over to his uncle Charles the Bald who put him in a monastery.

In 852, Count Fredelo of Toulouse died and Charles the Bald appointed Frédelon's brother Raymond as the new count. This was a special favor, normally counts were only administrative agents not chosen in the same family. However, it would prove to be the start of the dynasty of the counts of Toulouse, who were all descendants of Count Raymond I of Toulouse. Meanwhile, Pippin II of Aquitaine had escaped from his monastery in 854, and he was raising an insurrection in Aquitaine but failed. He then resorted to calling the Vikings for help. In 864, at the head of a Viking army, Pippin II of Aquitaine besieged Toulouse where the count of Toulouse resisted fiercely. The siege failed, and the Vikings left to plunder other areas of Aquitaine. Pippin II, abandoned by all, saw the ruins of his ambitions. He was captured and again put in a monastery by his uncle, where he died soon after.

In 866, Charles the Child died. Charles the Bald then made his other son, Louis the Stammerer (Louis le Bègue), the new king of Aquitaine. By then, the central state in the kingdom of France was rapidly losing authority. Charles the Bald was rather unsuccessful at containing the Vikings; local populations had to rely on their local counts to resist the Vikings, and the counts soon became the main source of authority, challenging the central authority of Charles the Bald in Paris. As they grew in power, they started to be succeeded in the same family and establish local dynasties. Wars between the central power and the counts arose, as well as wars between the competing counts, which further debilitated the defenses against the Vikings. Western Europe, and France in particular, was again entering a new Dark Age, which would prove even more disastrous than those of the 6th and 7th centuries.

In 877, Charles the Bald had to give in: he signed the Capitulary of Quierzy, which allowed counts to be succeeded by their sons when they died. This was the founding stone of feudalism in western Europe. Charles the Bald died four months later, his so Louis the Stammerer did not choose any of his sons to become the new king of Aquitaine, thus in effect putting an end to the kingdom of Aquitaine, which would never be revived again. In practice, during the years 870–890, the central power was so weakened that the counts in southern France achieved complete autonomy. The dynasties they established ruled independently. The central state in Paris would not be able to reassert its authority over the south of France for the next four centuries.

=== Independence ===
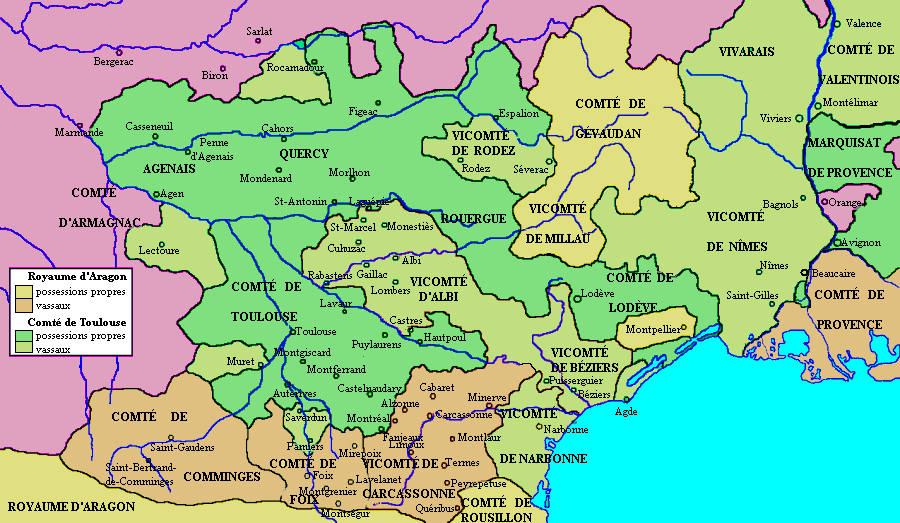
Political map of Languedoc on the eve of the Albigensian Crusade, under the rule of the House of Toulouse

By the end of the 9th century, Toulouse had become the capital of an independent county, the county of Toulouse, ruled by the dynasty founded by Fredelo, who in theory was under the sovereignty of the king of France, but in practice was totally independent. The counts of Toulouse had to fight to maintain their position at first. They were challenged by the dynasty of the counts of Auvergne (ruling over the northeastern part of the former Aquitaine) who claimed the county of Toulouse as their own, and even temporarily ousted the counts of Toulouse from the city of Toulouse.

On the death of Count William the Pious of Auvergne in 918 they came into the possession of Gothia which had been in the family of the counts of Auvergne for two generations. Thus, they more than doubled their territory, once again reuniting Toulouse with the Mediterranean coast from Narbonne to Nîmes. The county of Toulouse took its definite shape, from Toulouse in the west to the Rhone River in the east, a unity that would survive until the French Revolution as the province of Languedoc. Toulouse would never again be part of the Aquitaine polity, whose capital in later times would become Poitiers, then Bordeaux. Count William was the first to recreate the title of Duke of Aquitaine for himself in the 890s; then the count of Poitiers inherited the title in 927. In 932 the king of France Raoul was fighting against the count of Poitiers, and he transferred the title of Duke of Aquitaine to his new ally Count Raymond III Pons of Toulouse. However, the counts of the former Aquitaine all ruled independently, and did not recognize a superior authority.

Various factions were competing for the throne of France, but since all central authority had disappeared, the position of King of France had become an almost empty title. After Raoul's death, another faction succeeded in establishing an English bred Carolingian prince to the throne, Louis IV. Raymond III Pons was from the opposite faction and so when he died in 950 Louis IV awarded the title of Duke of Aquitaine to Count William III Towhead of Poitiers who was an ally of Louis IV. From then on the title of Duke of Aquitaine would be used in the family of the counts of Poitiers, whose power base of Poitou was in the northwestern part of the former Aquitaine. The counts of Toulouse would soon forget any dreams about Aquitaine. Eventually, on the death of the Carolingian king of France Louis V in 987, the Robertian faction succeeded in having its chief, Hugh Capet elected to the French throne. This time, the Carolingian dynasty effectively ended. Hugh Capet was the founder the Capetian dynasty, which would rule in France for the next eight centuries. However, from this point forward, the history of France is irrelevant to Toulouse, at least until the 13th century.

=== 10th century ===
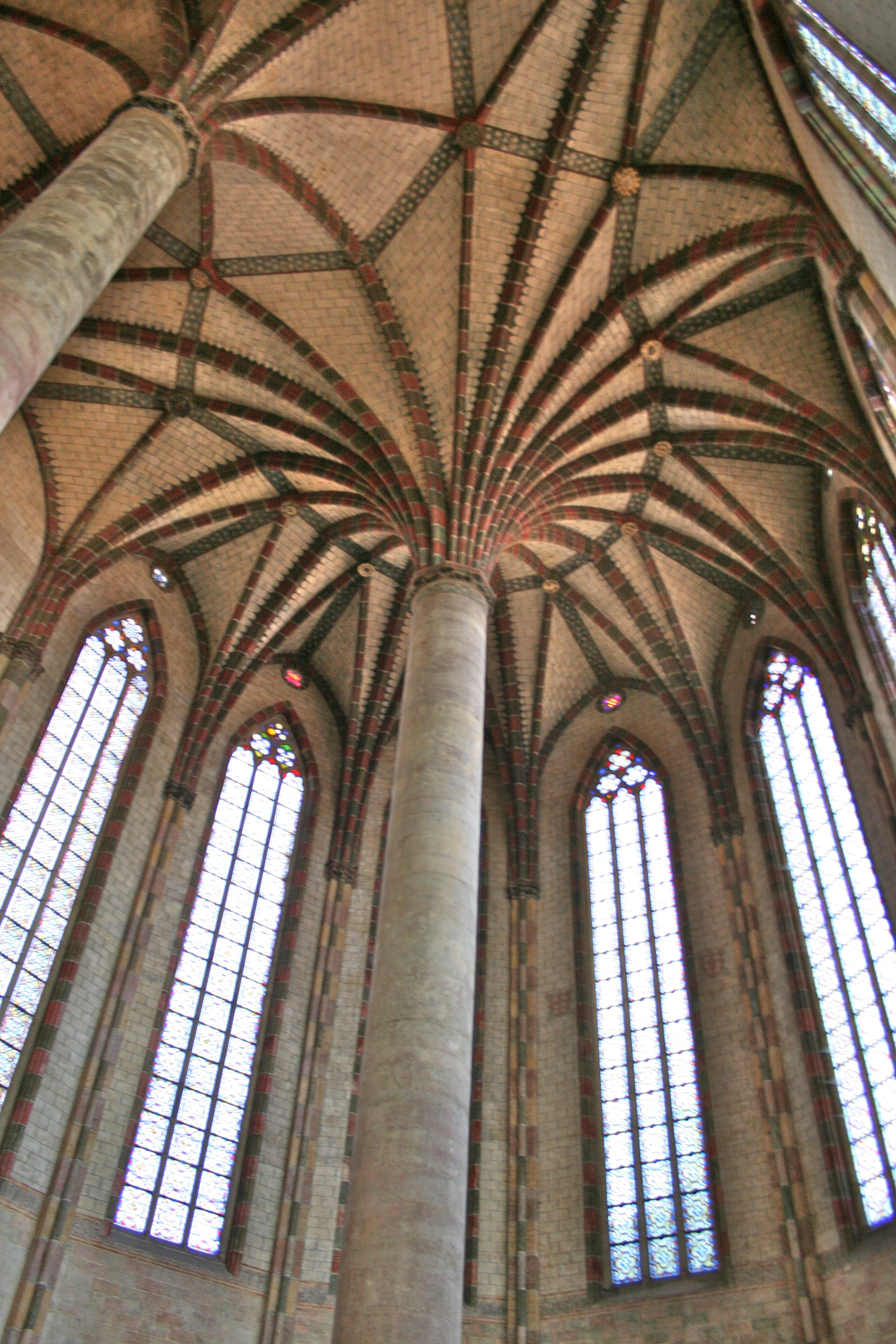
Les Jacobins in Toulouse

The counts of Toulouse had extended their rule to the Mediterranean coast, but they would not long enjoy the large domain they had succeeded in carving out for themselves. The 10th century was perhaps the worst century for western Europe in the last two millennia. This conjugated with dramatic civil wars, bad weather, plagues, and population loss. Entire areas of western Europe returned to wilderness and cities were depopulated. Another phenomenon was the complete disappearance of central authority where power fragmented.

By the end of the 10th century, France was ruled by thousands of local rulers who controlled only one town, or one castle and the few villages around. Toulouse and its county was exactly reflecting this situation. Between 900 and 980 the counts of Toulouse gradually lost control over the county, with the emergence of local dynastic rulers in every part of it. By the end of the 10th century the counts of Toulouse only had authority over a few estates scattered around the county. Even the city of Toulouse was ruled by a viscount independent from the counts of Toulouse.

Abd al-Rahman III of Córdoba managed to reunite Muslim Spain and launched an offensive against the northern Christian kingdoms and went as far north as Toulouse, without capturing the city. In 924, the Magyars (ancestors of the Hungarians) launched an expedition toward the west and went as far as Toulouse, but they were defeated by Count Raymond III Pons of Toulouse. At the end of the 10th century all the Carolingian wars and subsequent invasions had left the county of Toulouse in disarray. However, Toulouse was perhaps faring a little better than northern France in the sense that its proximity to Muslim Spain meant there was a strong flow of knowledge and culture coming from the schools and printing houses of Córdoba. Toulouse had also retained Roman Law unlike northern France, and had in general kept more of the Roman legacy, even in these troubled times. The ground was there for a recovery of civilization.

=== 11th–12th century ===
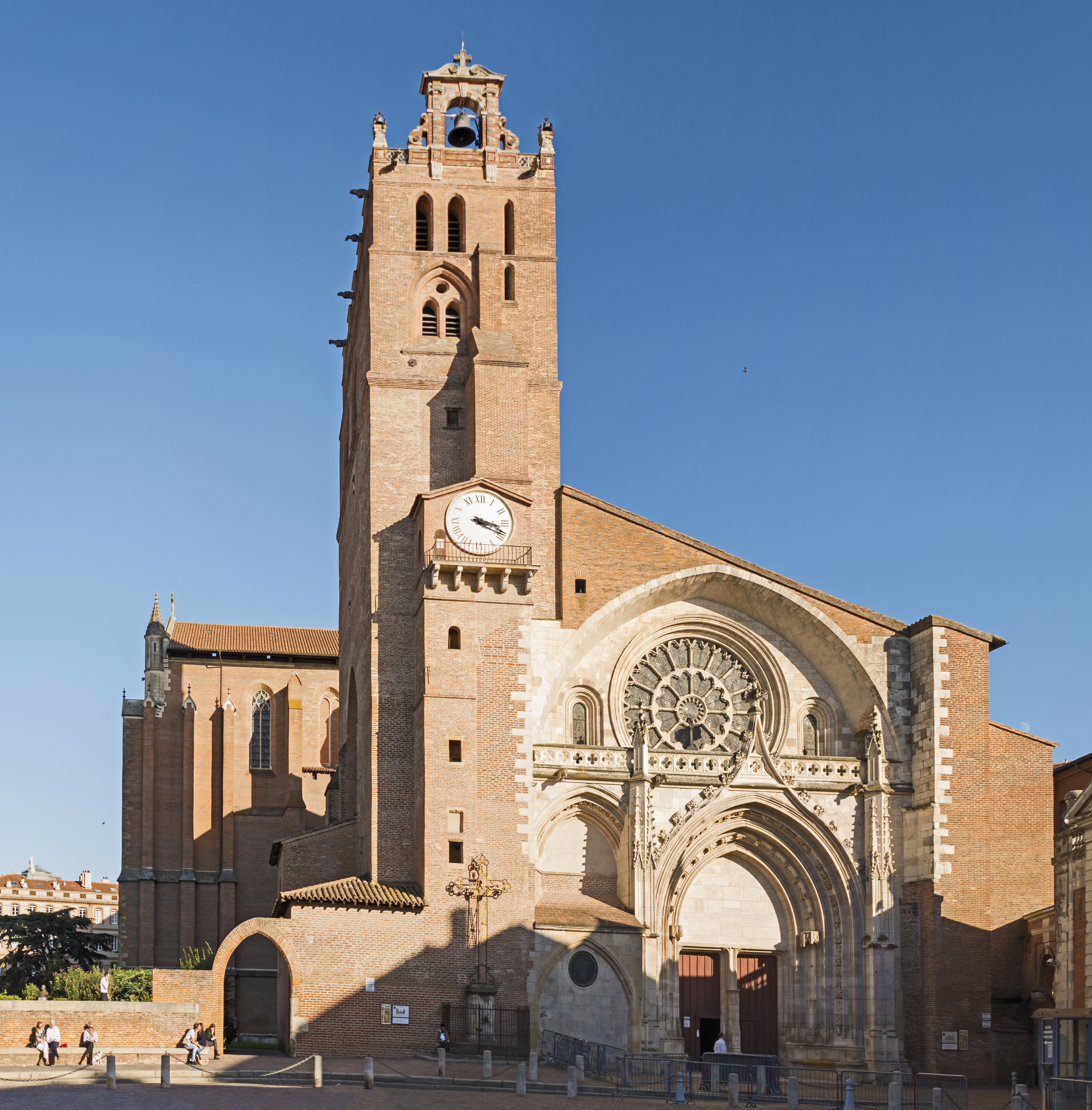
Saint-Étienne cathedral

At the beginning of the second millennium, the drifting attitude of the clergy and the confiscation of the Church by the Toulouse administration initiated a degradation of the worship. The Saint-Sernin church, the Daurade basilica, and the Saint-Étienne cathedral were not maintained properly. New religious currents appeared, like the Cluniac reform. Bishop Isarn, helped by Pope Gregory VII, tried to put everything back in order. He gave the Daurade Basilica to the Cluniac abbots in 1077. In Saint-Sernin, he met a strong opposition in the person of Raimond Gayrard, a provost who had just built a hospital for the poor and was proposing to build a basilica.

Supported by count Guilhem IV, Saint Raymond finally gained permission from Pope Urban II to dedicate the building in 1096. The religious quarrels had just awoken the faith of Toulouse. This rebirth was accompanied by a new demographic progression, supported by technically more efficient agriculture.

The suburbs of Saint-Michel and Saint Cyprien were built during this period. The Daurade bridge connected in 1181 the Saint-Cyprien suburb to the gates of the city. The suburbs of Saint-Sernin and Saint-Pierre des Cuisines also had a remarkable expansion.

The end of the 11th century marked the departure of Count Raymond IV to the First Crusade. Raymond led the largest contingent of the Crusade, and did not leave the Holy Land after the capture of Jerusalem, instead establishing himself as Count of Tripoli. He died in battle in 1105 in the Levant.

Various succession wars followed, besieging Toulouse several times. In 1119, the population of Toulouse proclaimed Raymond's younger son Alphonse Jourdain count. Alphonse Jourdain, willing to be grateful to his people, reduced several taxes immediately, for example on salt and wine.

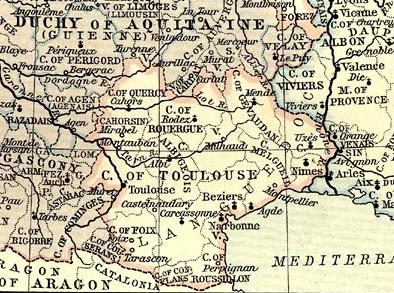
Map of the County of Toulouse in 1154

From the middle years of the 12th century, the people of Toulouse seem to have begun to free themselves from the most oppressive feudal dues. With the death of the count, an administration of eight "capitulaires" was created. Under the direction of the count, they had the responsibility of regulating the exchanges and making sure the laws were applied. These were the Capitouls, whose first acts were dated in 1152. In 1152 we have traces of a commune consilium Tolosae making police ordinances in its own name "with the advice of Lord Raymond, count of Toulouse, duke of Narbonne, and marquis of Provence". This act was witnessed by six capitularii, four duly appointed judges (judices constiluti), and two advocates. Twenty-three years later there were twelve capitularii or consuls, six for the city and six for its suburbs, all of them elected and sworn to do justice in whatever municipal matters were brought before them.

In 1176, the "chapitre" already had twelve members, each of them representing a district of Toulouse, or a suburb. The consuls quickly opposed count Raimond V. The population of Toulouse was divided on the subject and in 1189, after ten years of fighting, the town council finally obtained the submission of the count.

In 1190, the construction of the future Capitole, the common house, the town council headquarters began. With twenty-four members, probably elected, the Capitouls granted themselves the rights of police, trade, imposition and started some conflicts with the closest cities. Toulouse was usually victorious, extending the domination of the patria tolosana. Despite the intervention of the king, the administration of the Capitouls gave a relative independence to the city, for nearly 600 years, until the French Revolution.

In 1222, the number of capitularii was increased to twenty-four; but they were forbidden to touch the city property, which was to remain in the charge of certain communarii chosen by themselves.

==== Albigensian Crusade ====
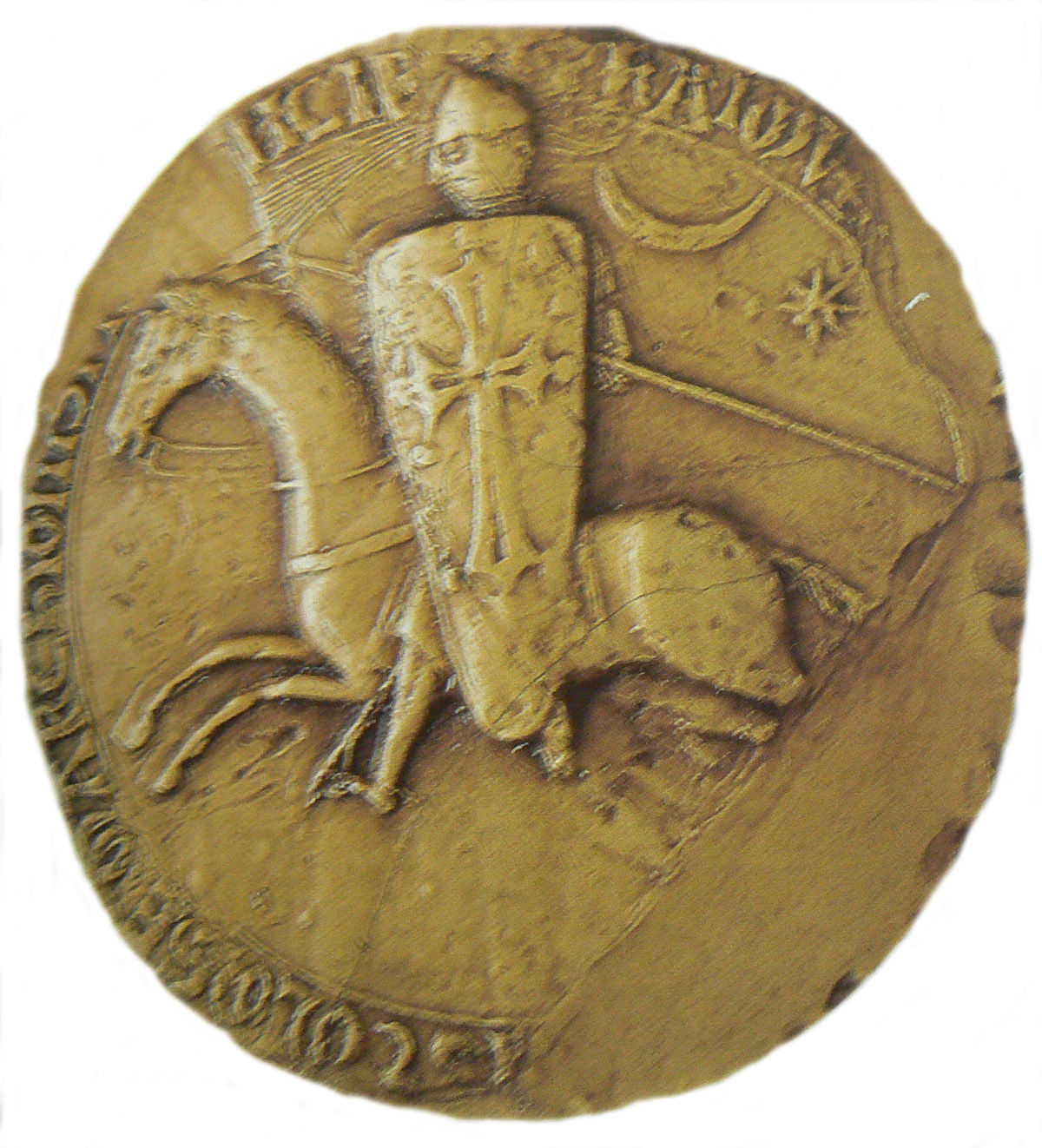
Raymond VI, Count of Toulouse

Catharism is a doctrine professing the separation of the material and the spiritual existences, one of its possible inspiration may be Bogomilism of Bulgaria. It conflicts with the orthodox confession. Called "heretics", the Cathars found a strong audience in the south of France, and during the 12th century. Simon de Montfort tried to exterminate them.

Toulouse was reached by the Cathar doctrine too. The orthodox White Brotherhood pursued the heretical Blacks in the streets of the city. The abbot of Foulques took advantage of this because the heretics were his creditors, and encouraged this inquisition.

Some people joined the white fighters, others chose to assist the besieged population. The consuls did not wish to encourage the division of Toulouse, and defied the pontifical authority, refusing to identify the heretics. Raymond VI, Count of Toulouse, a Catholic, who was excommunicated for his dispute with the pope, later sympathised with the heretics because he saw the crusade take an unholy path with the extermination at Beziers.

In 1211, the first siege of Toulouse by Simon de Montfort was unsuccessful but two years later, he successfully defeated the Toulouse army. Though Simon was practically the Count of Toulouse by 1214, it was not until Pope Innocent III's decision following the Fourth Council of the Lateran in November 1215 that it was made official.

Simon de Montfort was killed by a stone at the Siege of Toulouse in 1218. Until the last siege, the "whites" were fought against by the Toulouse populace. Louis VIII finally decided to give up in 1219. Raymond VI recognized the support he had received from the population, helping him to preserve his interests, gave up his last prerogatives to the Capitouls.

=== Within the Kingdom of France ===
The 13th century went in a political direction opposite to the path drawn by the past centuries. In the Treaty of Paris of 1229, Toulouse formally submitted to the crown of France. The county's sole heiress Joan was engaged to Alphonse, Count of Poitiers, a younger brother of Louis IX of France. The marriage became legal in 1241, but it remained childless so that after Joan's death the county fell to the crown of France by inheritance.

Also in 1229, the University of Toulouse was established after the Parisian model, intended as a means to dissolve the heretic movement. Various monastic orders, like the congregation of the order of frères prêcheurs, were started. They found a home in Les Jacobins. In parallel, a long period of inquisition began inside the walls of Toulouse. The fear of repression obliged the notabilities to exile, or to convert themselves. The inquisition lasted nearly 400 years, making Toulouse its capital.

Count Raimond VII was convicted of heresy and died in 1249 without an heir. The Toulouse county was given to the king of France, who imposed his laws through appointed seneschals. The power of the Capitouls was reduced.

In 1323 the Consistori del Gay Saber was established in Toulouse to preserve the lyric art of the troubadours. Toulouse became the center of Occitan literary culture for the next hundred years; the Consistori was last active in 1484.

Reinforcing its place as an administrative center, the city grew richer, participating in the trade of Bordeaux wine with England, as well as cereals and textiles.

Accompanying the inquisition, many threats affected the city. Plague, fire and flood devastated the districts. The Hundred Years' War decimated Toulouse. Despite strong immigration, the population lost 10,000 inhabitants in 70 years. Toulouse had 22,000 people in 1405.

== Women's rights ==
As a successor state of the Visigothic Kingdom and the Duchy of Aquitaine, Toulouse, along with the Aquitaine region and Languedoc (but not Gascony), inherited Visigothic Law and Roman Law which had combined to allow women more rights than their contemporaries would enjoy until the 20th century. Particularly with the Liber Judiciorum as codified in 642/643 and expanded on in the Code of Recceswinth in 653, women could inherit land and title and manage it independently from their husbands or male relations, dispose of their property in legal wills if they had no heirs, and women could represent themselves and bear witness in court by age 14 and arrange for their own marriages by age 20. As a consequence, male-preference primogeniture was the practiced succession law for the nobility.

== Counts of Toulouse ==
Under the Carolingians, counts and dukes were appointed by the royal court. Later, this office became hereditary. The counts of Toulouse ruled the city of Toulouse and its surrounding county from the late 9th century until 1271. At times, the counts of Toulouse or family members were also counts of Quercy, Rouergue, Albi, Nîmes, Provence and marquesses of Gothia.
