= Alphonse of Toulouse =

Alphonse of Toulouse may refer to:

- Alphonse Jordan (1105–1148), Count of Toulouse (1112–48) as Alphonse I
- Alphonse II of Toulouse (died 1175/1189 or later), Count of Toulouse co-ruling with his elder brother from 1148
- Alphonse, Count of Poitiers (1220–1271), younger brother of King Louis IX of France, Count of Toulouse (1249–71) as Alphonse III
