= Siege of Beaucaire =

Battle during the Albigensian Crusade

- Part of Albigensian Crusade
Date	3 June 1216 - August 24 1216
Location	Beaucaire
Result	Toulouse victory

Belligerents
Crusaders	County of Toulouse

Commanders and leaders
Simon de Montfort	Raymond de Toulouse

Casualties and losses
Severe	Moderate

Siege of Beaucaire was a battle between Raymond VII of Toulouse and the Crusader leader Simon de Montfort during the Albigensian Crusade. It lasted from June 3 to August 24, 1216, it was a three-month conflict where Raymond VII successfully recaptured the city and the castle from Simon de Montfront.

== Background ==
During the uprising against Crusaders, Raymond VII arrived in May 1216 and the citizens of Beaucaire welcomed him.

== Siege ==
the Crusaders were caught unprepared and were forced to retreat into the town's castle, leaving the city to Raymond. Raymond then besieged the castle, keeping the garrison under guard for three months. Simon de Montfort tried to relieve his men, but his forces were repulsed. The trapped crusaders were reduced to eating their own horses before surrendering on August 24, 1216.

== Significance ==
Historians view the Siege of Beaucaire as Simon de Montfort's first major loss of the Albigensian Crusade and a victory to the House of Toulouse.
