= Alfonso II of Toulouse =

Alfonso II (French: Alphonse; died 1175/1189 or later) was an Occitan nobleman and the co-count of Toulouse, duke of Narbonne and marquis of Provence from 1148 until his death.

Alfonso was the son of Count Alfonso Jordan of Toulouse and Faydiva d'Uzes. After the death of Alfonso I, his eldest son and Alfonso II's brother Raymond V inherited the County of Toulouse and the Marquisate of Provence. Immediately after his accession, Raymond V made his brother Alfonso co-ruler with him.

In 1171, Viscount Roger II Trencavel of Béziers, Albi and Carcassonne swore allegiance to Alfonso II. Sometime between 1175/1189, Alfonso confirmed the donation of King Henry II of England to Chartres Cathedral. After this year, there is no mention of Alfonso. He likely predeceased his brother Raymond, who died in 1194 and became sole ruler upon Alfonso's death without heirs.

Preceded by Alfonso Jordan	Count of Toulouse; Margrave of Provence; Duke of Narbonne; 1148–? With: Raymond V	Succeeded by Raymond V as sole ruler
