= Black Brotherhood =

Urban society (or militia) established in Toulouse in 1211

The Black Brotherhood was an urban society (or militia) established in Toulouse in 1211 in response to the White Brotherhood led by the bishop Folquet de Marselha. The Blacks opposed the Albigensian Crusade and supported the Count of Toulouse, Raymond VII.

Unlike the Whites, who were predominantly from the city proper, many of the Blacks came from the suburbs. They were moderate in their political outlook and some may have been Cathars, the very heretics the Whites were set up to destroy. They defended Cathar and Jewish homes and shops from the violence of the Whites and, according to William of Puylaurens, "daily the two parties would clash, banners flying, bristling with weapons, even with cavalry in evidence."

== Sources ==
- Oldenbourg, Zoe. Massacre at Montsegur: A History of the Albigensian Crusade. Sterling Publishing Company, 2006. ISBN 1-84212-428-5.
