= Raymond II of Toulouse =

Raymond II (died 924) was the Count of Toulouse, Viscount of Nîmes, and Count of Albi. He was the, probably elder, son of Odo of Toulouse and Garsenda.

In 886, at the death of Bernard the Calf, he succeeded to the comital title in Nîmes and Albi while Odo his father received the county of Toulouse. In 898, his father made him Count of Rouergue. In 906, Odo gave Rouergue to his younger son Ermengol and made Raymond co-count in Toulouse. In 918, Odo died and Toulouse went to Raymond, while Rouergue, along with Nîmes and Albi, went to Ermengol. Raymond also received his father's title of Duke of Septimania. He died in 924 and left his titles to his son Raymond Pons.

Raymond married Guinidilda, daughter of Wilfred II Borrel, Count of Barcelona. Their only child was Raymond Pons.

== Sources ==
- Lewis, Archibald R. The Development of Southern French and Catalan Society, 718–1050. University of Texas Press: Austin, 1965.
