= Raymond V of Toulouse =

Count of Toulouse from 1148 to 1194

Raymond V (Occitan: Ramon; c. 1134 – c. 1194) was Count of Toulouse from 1148 until his death in 1194.

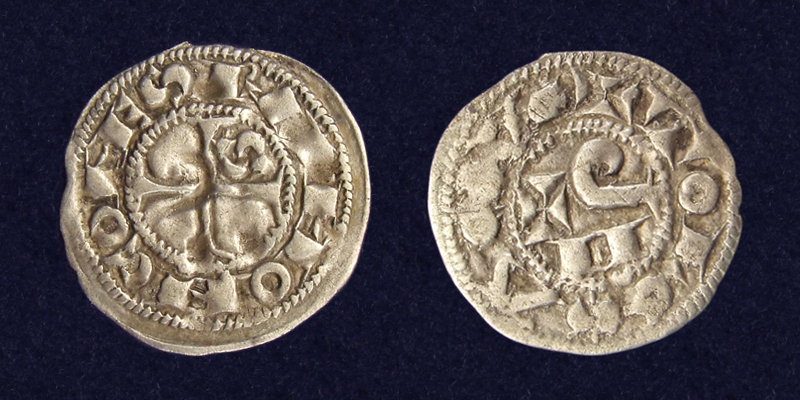
Silver obol of Raymond V count of Toulouse.

He was the son of Alphonse I of Toulouse and Faydida of Provence. Alphonse took his son with him on the Second Crusade in 1147. When Alphonse died in Caesarea in 1148, the county of Toulouse passed to his son Raymond, then aged 14. Raymond co-ruled with his brother Alfonso II. The young count was honoured by Rorgo Fretellus, archdeacon of Nazareth, who dedicated a new edition of his Description of the Holy Places to him.

As count, Raymond permitted the first assembly of townsmen in Toulouse, the origin of the later capitouls.

In 1165, in the town of Lombers, the bishop of Albi, attended by both clerics and members of the nobility, including Constance, the wife of Raymond V, interrogated and debated with members of an alleged heretical sect. Calling themselves "Good Men", this group held beliefs similar to those of Henry of Lausanne and Peter of Bruys as well as indicating Cathar influence. While the Good Men declined to respond to a number of questions about their beliefs, they told the bishop that they did not accept the Old Testament, and that their reading of the New Testament persuaded them that they should not take oaths. They further challenged the jurisdiction of the bishop.

In 1178 Raymond requested assistance from the Cistercians to combat heresy in his dominions. Wakefield suggests that being under pressure on his western border from King Alfonso II of Aragon, Raymond wished to present himself as a defender of the faith. A joint legatine and royal commission arrived in Toulouse charged with authority to preach, investigate, and condemn. It operated for three months.

== Family ==
In 1153/6, Raymond married Constance, daughter of King Louis VI of France by his second wife, Adelaide of Maurienne. Constance was the childless widow of Eustace IV, Count of Boulogne, elder son of Stephen, King of England. Because the couple were related within prohibited degrees, they were able to obtain a separation by ecclesiastical authority in 1165. By this time, they already had five children, including:

1. Raymond VI, who succeeded his father as Count of Toulouse
2. Aubri, died 1180
3. Adelaide or Azalais of Toulouse, who married Roger II Trencavel in 1171 and died in 1199
4. Baldwin, born 1165, executed on the orders of his brother Raymond VI in 1214

Raymond was engaged with Richeza of Poland, widow of Ramon Berenguer II, Count of Provence.

Raymond also had an illegitimate daughter:

1. Indie (July 1192 – 27 September 1249), who married firstly Guilabert de Lautrec (d.1215), and secondly Bernard de L'Isle-Jourdain (d.1228), and had issue.

== Sources ==
- Boeren, P. C. (1980). Rorgo Fretellus de Nazareth et sa description de la Terre Sainte: histoire et édition du texte. North-Holland Publishing.
- Pegg, Mark Gregory (2009). A Most Holy War: The Albigensian Crusade and the Battle for Christendom. Oxford University Press.
- Richard, Jean (1999). The Crusades, C.1071-c.1291. Translated by Birrell, Jean. Cambridge University Press.
- Wakefield, Walter Leggett; Evans, Austin Patterson, eds. (1991). Heresies of the High Middle Ages. Columbia University Press.

Preceded by Alfonso Jordan	Count of Toulouse; Margrave of Provence; Duke of Narbonne; 1148–1194; With: Alfonso II	Succeeded by Raymond VI
