= Bertrand of Toulouse =

Count of Toulouse and Tripoli

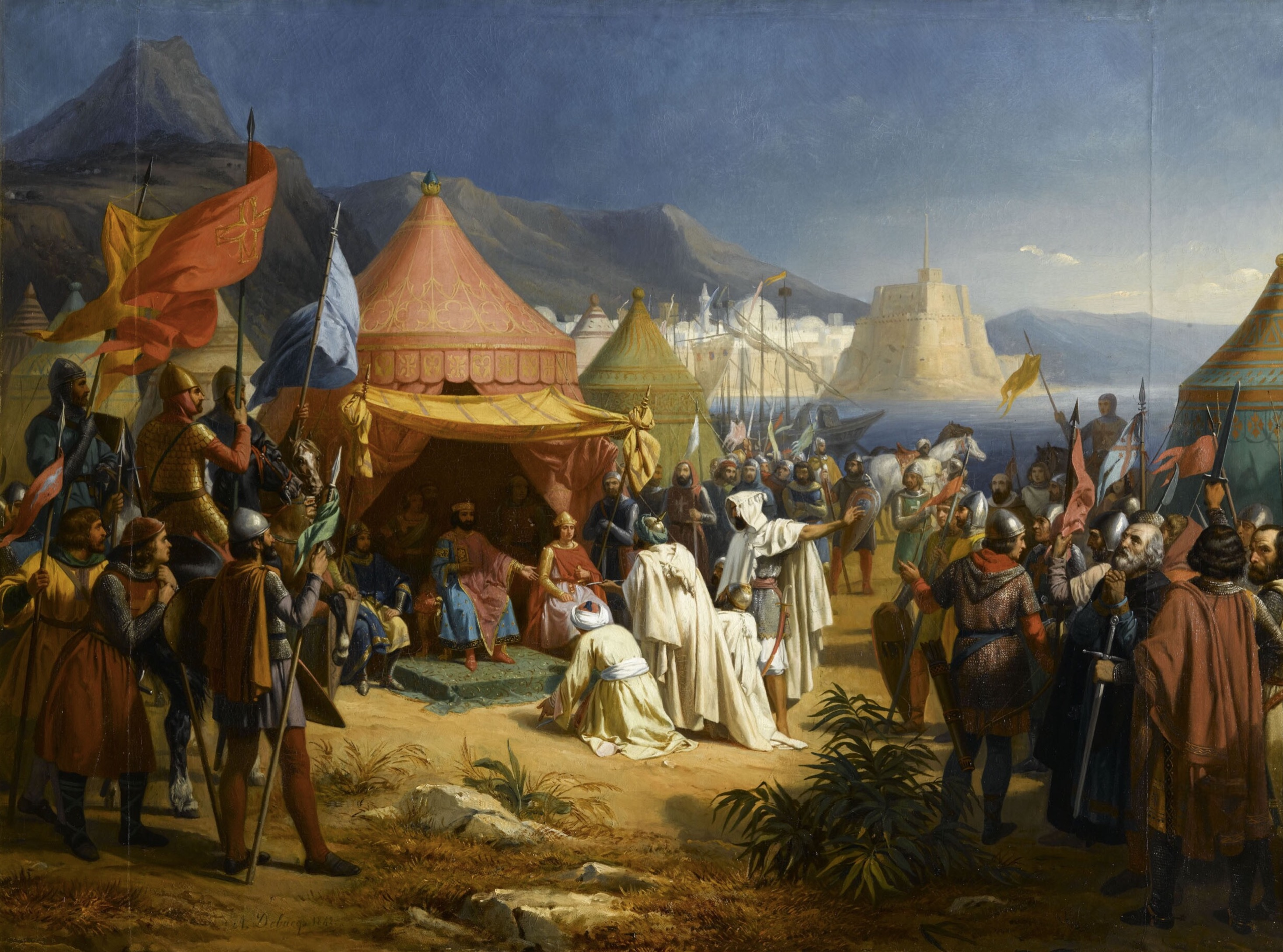
Fakhr al-Mulk ibn Ammar submitting to Bertrand of Toulouse, 1842 painting by Charles-Alexandre Debacq

Bertrand of Toulouse (or Bertrand of Tripoli) (died 1112) was count of Toulouse, and was the first count of Tripoli to rule in Tripoli itself.

Bertrand was the eldest son of Raymond IV, Count of Toulouse, and had ruled Toulouse since Raymond left on the First Crusade in 1095. He was, between 1098 and 1100, dispossessed by his cousin Philippa, Countess of Toulouse and her husband William IX, Duke of Aquitaine, who marched into Toulouse and captured it. They mortgaged it back later to Bertrand in 1100 to fund Duke William's expedition to the Holy Land. Bertrand officially became count of Toulouse when Raymond died in 1105, and in 1108 he travelled to Tripoli to take control there as well.

Bertrand deposed Raymond's nephew William II Jordan as nominal count of Tripoli in 1109, and with Baldwin I of Jerusalem of the Kingdom of Jerusalem and a fleet of Genoese ships, he captured Tripoli on 12 July.

Bertrand married Helie of Burgundy, daughter of Eudes I, in June 1095.

Bertrand ruled in Tripoli until his death in 1112. He was succeeded by his son Pons in the County of Tripoli, and by his brother Alfonso Jordan in the County of Toulouse - although Toulouse was at that point again lost to Philippa and William.

== Sources ==
- Asbridge, Thomas S. (2000). The Creation of the Principality of Antioch, 1098-1130. Woodbridge: The Boydell Press.
- Bouchard, Constance Brittain (1987). Sword, Miter, and Cloister: Nobility and the Church in Burgundy, 980–1198. Ithaka, New York: Cornell University Press.
- Venning, Timothy (2015). A Chronology of the Crusades. London: Routledge.
- William of Puylaurens (2003). The Chronicle of William of Puylaurens: The Albigensian Crusade and its Aftermath. Translated by Sibley, W.A.; Sibley, M.D. Woodbridge: The Boydell Press.

Preceded by Philippa	Count of Toulouse; 1095/1105–1108	Succeeded by Alfonso Jordan
Preceded by Raymond IV	Count of Tripoli; 1109–1112	Succeeded by Pons
