= Fulcoald of Rouergue =

Fulcoald, Foucaud, Fulguald or Fulqualdus is sometimes called the Count of Rouergue and founder of that dynasty of counts which ruled Toulouse and often all of Gothia for the next four centuries. In 837, he was appointed missus dominicus along with Ragambald in the pago Rutenico seu Nemausense: country of Rouergue and Nîmes (probably Septimania).

Fulcoald married Senegunda (or Senegundia, French Sénégonde), whose family is not recorded, although some web sites, without source, name her as a daughter of Alda ("of Gellone"). By her he had two sons: Fredelo and Raymond.

== Sources ==
- Foixstory: Les Comtes de Toulouse.

Preceded by Gilbert	Count of Rouergue c. 820 – c. 837	Succeeded by Raymond I
