= Odo of Toulouse =

Odo (or Eudes) (also Odon or Odonus) was the count of Toulouse from 872 to 918 or 919, when he died.

He was a son of Raymond I of Toulouse and Bertha, or of Bernard II of Toulouse.

He married Garsenda, daughter of Ermengol of Albi, and probably had three children. His sons were Raymond II, whom he associated in the countship by giving him Rouergue (before 898), and Ermengol, who inherited that same province. It has been suggested for onomastic reasons that Odo was the father of Garsenda, wife of Wilfred II of Barcelona.

== Sources ==
- Lewis, Archibald R. (1965). The Development of Southern French and Catalan Society, 718–1050. University of Texas Press.
- Kuefler, Mathew (2013). "Dating and Authorship of the Writings about Saint Gerald of Aurillac". Viator. 44 (2). University of California Press: 49–98.
- de Vajay, Szabolcs (1980). "Comtesses d'origine occitane dans la Marche d'Espagne aux 10e and 11e siècles. Essai sur le rattachement de Richilde, de Garsende et de Letgardis, comtesses de Barcelone, et de Thietberge comtesse d'Urgel au contexte généalogique occitan". Hidalguía. 28: 585-616, 601-2.
