= William IV of Toulouse =

Count of Toulouse

William IV, Count of Toulouse
- Born: c. 1040
- Died: 1094 (aged 53–54)
- Noble family: Rouergue
- Spouse: Emma of Mortain
- Issue: Philippa, Countess of Toulouse; William-Jordan (illegitimate)
- Father: Pons of Toulouse
- Mother: Almodis de la Marche

William IV of Toulouse (c. 1040 – 1094) was Count of Toulouse, Margrave of Provence, and Duke of Narbonne from 1061 to 1094. He was the son of Pons of Toulouse and Almodis de la Marche. He was married to Emma of Mortain, daughter of Robert, Count of Mortain, who gave him one daughter, Philippa.

== Life ==
William married twice, and produced two legitimate sons; neither, however, survived infancy, leaving daughter Philippa as his heiress. As Toulouse had no precedent of female inheritance, this raised a question with regard to succession. In 1088, when William departed for the Holy Land, he left his brother, Raymond of Saint-Gilles, to govern in his stead (and, it was later claimed, to succeed him). Within five years, William was dead, and Raymond took power (Note: It has been claimed that William married daughter Philippa off to the King of Aragon, Sancho Ramirez, to prevent her from causing civil war by claiming Toulouse (e.g. Meade, Marion, Eleanor of Aquitaine). However, two recent historians who have made a detailed study of the issue have dismissed this claim. Ruth E Harvey, in "The wives of the first troubadour Duke William IX of Aquitaine", Journal of Medieval History, vol 19, 1993, p 315, concludes that, contrary to prior assumptions, William IX was certainly Philippa of Toulouse's only husband. Szabolcs de Vajay, in "Ramire II le Moine, roi d'Aragon et Agnes de Poitou dans l'histoire et la légende", Mélanges offerts à René Crozet, 2 vol, Poitiers, 1966, vol 2, p 727-750, states that the marriage to an unnamed king of Aragon reported by a non-contemporary chronicler is imaginary, even though it has appeared broadly in modern histories, and he cites J de Salarrullana de Dios, Documentos correspondientes al reinado de Sancho Ramirez, Saragossa, 1907, vol I, nr 51, p 204-207 to document that his prior wife, Felicie, was clearly still married to Sancho months before his death, thus making the marriage several years earlier to Philippa completely unsupportable.) – although, after Philippa married William IX of Aquitaine, they laid claim to Toulouse and fought, off and on, for years to try to reclaim it from Raymond and his children.

He was the great-grandfather of Eleanor of Aquitaine, by his daughter's marriage to William IX of Aquitaine, and Eleanor's descendants continued to lay claim to Toulouse based on descent from William IV.

== Sources ==
- Cheyette, Fredric L. (2004). Ermengard of Narbonne and the World of the Troubadours. Cornell University Press.
- Hill, John Hugh; Hill, Laurita Lyttleton (1962). Raymond IV, Count of Toulouse. Syracuse University Press.

William IV of Toulouse House of Rouergue Born: 1040 Died: 1094
Preceded by Pons	Count of Toulouse; 1061–1094	Succeeded by Raymond IV
