= Count of Toulouse =

County of Toulouse
- Coat of arms of the Counts of Toulouse.
- Creation date: 778 (fief); 1681 (courtesy title)
- Peerage: Peerage of France
- First holder: Chorso (fief); Louis Alexandre de Bourbon (courtesy title)
- Last holder: Joan of Toulouse (fief); Louis Alexandre de Bourbon (courtesy title)
- Status: Extinct
- Extinction date: 1 December 1737

The count of Toulouse (Occitan: comte de Tolosa, French: comte de Toulouse) was the ruler of Toulouse during the 8th to 13th centuries. Originating as vassals of the Frankish kings, the hereditary counts ruled the city of Toulouse and its surrounding county from the late 9th century until 1270. The counts and other family members were also at various times counts of Quercy, Rouergue, Albi, and Nîmes, and sometimes margraves (military defenders of the Holy Roman Empire) of Septimania and Provence. Count Raymond IV founded the Crusader state of Tripoli, and his descendants were also counts there. They reached the zenith of their power during the 11th and 12th centuries, but after the Albigensian Crusade the county fell to the kingdom of France, nominally in 1229 and de facto in 1271.

Later the title was revived for Louis Alexandre, Count of Toulouse, a bastard of Louis XIV (1678–1737).

== History ==
=== Carolingian era ===
During the youth of young Louis the Pious his tutor, Torson (sometimes Chorso or Choson), ruled at Toulouse as the first count. In 788, Count Torson was captured by the Basques under Adalric, who made him swear an oath of allegiance to the Duke of Gascony, Lupus II. Upon his release, Charlemagne, at the diet of Worms (790), replaced him with his Frankish cousin, William of Gellone. William in turn successfully subdued the Gascons.

In the ninth century, Toulouse suffered in common with the rest of western Europe. It was besieged by Charles the Bald in 844, and taken four years later by the Normans, who had sailed up the Garonne. About 852, Raymond I, count of Quercy, succeeded his brother Fredelo as Count of Rouergue and Toulouse. It is from Raymond that all the later counts of Toulouse document their descent. His grandchildren divided their parents' estates; of these Raymond II became count of Toulouse, and Ermengol, count of Rouergue; while the hereditary titles of Septimania, Quercy and Albi were shared between them.

Raymond II's grandson, William III (known as the first William Taillefer), married Emma of Provence, and handed down part of that lordship to his younger son Bertrand I of Forcalquier.

William's elder son, Pons, left two children, one of whom, William IV succeeded his father in Toulouse, Albi and Quercy; while the younger, Raymond IV, inherited the county of Saint-Gilles from his father and a short while later the much larger County of Rouergue from his cousin.

=== High Middle Ages ===
Coat of arms of the counts of Toulouse in the 13th century

From this time on, the counts of Toulouse were powerful lords in southern France. Raymond IV, assumed the formal titles of Marquis of Provence, Duke of Narbonne and Count of Toulouse. Afterward, the count set sail with the First Crusade. After the conquest of Jerusalem, he set siege to the City of Tripoli in the Levant. Raymond died before the city was taken in 1109, but is considered the first Count of Tripoli. His son, Bertrand, then took the title. He and his successors ruled the Crusader state until 1187 (when the Kingdom of Jerusalem was overrun by Saladin).

While Raymond was away in the Holy Land, rule of Toulouse was seized by William IX, Duke of Aquitaine, who claimed the city by right of his wife, Philippa, the daughter of William IV; William was unable to hold it long. Raymond's son and successor, Bertrand, had followed him to the Holy Land in 1109. Therefore, at Raymond's death the family's great estates and Toulouse went to Bertrand's brother, Alfonso Jordan. His rule, however, was disturbed by the ambition of William IX and his granddaughter, Eleanor of Aquitaine, who urged her husband Louis VII of France to support her claims to Toulouse by war. Upon her divorce from Louis and her subsequent marriage to Henry II of England, Eleanor pressed her claims through Henry, who at last, in 1173, forced Raymond V to do him homage for Toulouse.

Raymond V, a patron of the troubadours, died in 1194, and was succeeded by his son, Raymond VI. Following the 1208 assassination of the Papal legate, Pierre de Castelnau, Raymond was excommunicated and the County of Toulouse was placed under interdict by Pope Innocent III. Raymond was eager to appease the Pope, and was pardoned. However, following a second excommunication, Raymond's holdings in the Languedoc were desolated by the Albigensian Crusade, led by Simon de Montfort. Raymond's forces were defeated in 1213, depriving him of his fees, and he was exiled to England. Montfort finally occupied Toulouse in 1215.

Raymond VII succeeded his father in 1222. He left an only daughter, Joan, who married Alphonse, the son of Louis VIII of France and brother of Louis IX of France. At the deaths of Alfonse and Joan in 1271, the vast holdings of the counts of Toulouse lapsed to the Crown.

Political map of the Languedoc under rule of the House of Toulouse on the eve of the Albigensian Crusade

The French region in 1154

=== Within the kingdom of France ===
In 1271, Toulouse passed to the Crown of France, by the Treaty of Meaux, 1229. From 1271 to 1285, Philip III of France, King of France and nephew of Alphonse bore the title of count of Toulouse, but the mention of the title is abandoned after his death.

Only in 1681, Toulouse was resurrected as a royal appanage by Louis XIV for his illegitimate son with Françoise-Athénaïs, marquise de Montespan, Louis-Alexandre.

== List of counts of Toulouse ==
=== Carolingian era ===
- 778–790 Torson, first Count of Toulouse; deposed by Charlemagne
- 790–806 William of Gellone
- 806–816 Beggo
- 816–835 Berengar
- 835–842 Bernard of Septimania
  - 842–843 Acfred by conquest
- 844–849 William of Septimania, successfully opposed Fredelon

=== House of Rouergue ===
- 844–852: Fredelon
- 852–863: Raymond I

=== Hunfridings ===
- 863–865: Humfrid, count by conquest
  - 863–865: Sunyer, from the Bellonids, appointed to oppose Humfrid

=== House of Rouergue (restored) ===
- 865–877: Bernard II the Calf

=== Guillemides (Auvergne) ===
- 877–886: Bernard III Plantapilosa

=== House of Rouergue (restored) ===
- 886–918: Odo
- 918–924: Raymond II
- 924–ca.950: Raymond III Pons (I)

(Note: It had long been thought that Raymond III Pons was succeeded directly by William III. However, recent research suggests there were at least one, and as many as three, previously overlooked counts; and that at least one of these three was named Raymond. This has resulted in conflicting numbering systems regarding the later Raymonds, although most historians continue to use the established, traditional numbering for them. They are Raymond (IV) (c. 950–961), Hugh (c. 961–972) and Raymond (V) (c. 972–978))

- 978–1037: William III Taillefer
- 1037–1061: Pons (II)
- 1061–1094: William IV
- 1094–1105: Raymond IV (VI) of St Gilles
  - 1098–1101: Philippa of Toulouse, daughter of William IV, was barred from inheritance in her grandfather's will.
  - 1098-1101: William IX of Aquitaine, husband of Philippa, claimed Toulouse for her after the departure of Raymond for the First Crusade.
- 1105–1112 Bertrand of Tripoli, son of Raymond IV (VI).
- 1112–1148 Alfonso I Jordan
  - 1114-1117: Philippa of Toulouse and William IX of Aquitaine, invaded Toulouse, taking advantage of Alfonso Jordan's minority; Alfonso regained control in 1117.
  - 1118-1120: William X of Aquitaine, son of Philippa and William IX, gave up claimancy in 1120.
- 1148–1194 Raymond V (VII)
  - 1148-1175/89: Alfonso II, brother, co-ruler
- 1194–1222 Raymond VI (VIII)
  - 1215–1218: Simon IV de Montfort, usurper, count by conquest during the Albigensian Crusade
- 1222–1249: Raymond VII (IX)
- 1249–1271: Joan
  - 1249-1271: Alphonse (II) of France, husband, co-ruler
  - 1271: Philippa de Lomagne, great-granddaughter of Constance of Toulouse, daughter of Raymond VI, tries unsuccessfully to claim the inheritance of the county, as universal heir of Joan.

=== House of Bourbon ===
- 1681–1737: Louis Alexandre, illegitimate son of Louis XIV

== See also ==
- History of Toulouse
- Timeline of Toulouse

== Notes ==
.
