= Pons of Toulouse =

Count of Toulouse

Pons, Count of Toulouse
- Born: 1019
- Died: 1060 (aged 40–41); Toulouse
- Noble family: House of Rouergue
- Spouses: Majore; Almodis de La Marche
- Issue Detail: William IV, Count of Toulouse; Raymond IV, Count of Toulouse; Hugh
- Father: William III of Toulouse
- Mother: Emma of Provence

Pons (II) William (Note: Raymond Pons was "Pons I." In Latin it is Pontius or Poncius and Ponce in Spanish.) (1019–1060) was the Count of Toulouse from 1037. He was the eldest son and successor of William III Taillefer and Emma of Provence. He thus inherited the title marchio Provincæ. He is known to have owned many allods and he relied on Roman, Salic, and Gothic law.

Already in 1030, he possessed a lot of power in the Albigeois. In 1037, he gave many allodial churches and castles, including one half of that of Porta Spina, in the Albigeois, Nimois, and Provence as a bridal gift to his wife Majore.

In 1038, he split the purchase of the Diocese of Albi with the Trencavel family. In 1040, he donated property in Diens to Cluny. In 1047, he first appears as count palatine in a charter donating Moissac to Cluny.

Pons married his first wife, Mayor, daughter of King Sancho III of Navarre, in 1037. She either died not too long after or was repudiated. Between 1040 and 1045, he married Almodis de La Marche, former wife of Hugh V of Lusignan, but he repudiated her in 1053. They had:

- William IV, Count of Toulouse
- Raymond IV, Count Saint-Gilles, succeeded his brother.
- Hugh, abbot of Saint-Gilles
- Almodis, married Pierre, Count of Melgueil

Pons married a third time to Marjorie, daughter of Bernard-Roger, Count of Bigorre.

Pons died in Toulouse and was buried in Saint-Sernin, probably late in 1060 or early in 1061.

== Sources ==
- Edgington, Susan; Sweetenham, Carol, eds. (2011). The Chanson D'Antioche: An Old French Account of the First Crusade. Routledge.
- Graham-Leigh, Elaine (2005). The Southern French Nobility and the Albigensian Crusade. The Boydell Press.
- Lewis, Archibald R. The Development of Southern French and Catalan Society, 718–1050. University of Texas Press: Austin, 1965.
- Martínez Díez, Gonzalo (2007). Sancho III el Mayor Rey de Pamplona, Rex Ibericus (in Spanish). Madrid: Marcial Pons Historia. ISBN 978-84-96467-47-7.

Pons of Toulouse House of Toulouse Born: 991 Died: 1060
Preceded by William III	Counts of Toulouse; 1037–1060	Succeeded by William IV
