= Raymond IV of Toulouse =

French noble (c. 1041–1105)

Raymond IV
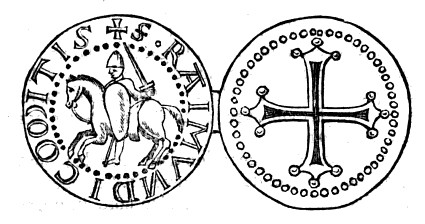
- Sketch of Raymond's seal

Count of Tripoli
- Reign: 1102 – 1105
- Successor: Alfonso Jordan

Count of Toulouse
- Reign: 1094 – 1105
- Predecessor: William IV
- Successor: Bertrand
- Born: c. 1041
- Died: 28 February 1105 (aged 63–64); Citadel of Tripoli, County of Tripoli
- Spouse: Daughter of Godfrey I of Arles; Matilda of Sicily; Elvira of Castile
- Issue: Bertrand; Alfonso Jordan
- House: House of Toulouse
- Father: Pons of Toulouse
- Mother: Almodis de la Marche
- Religion: Roman Catholic

Raymond of Saint-Gilles (c. 1041 – 28 February 1105), also called Raymond IV of Toulouse or Raymond I of Tripoli, was the count of Toulouse, duke of Narbonne, and margrave of Provence from 1094 until his death. He was one of the leaders of the First Crusade from 1096 to 1099. He spent the last five years of his life establishing the County of Tripoli in the Near East.

== Early years ==
Raymond was a son of Pons of Toulouse and Almodis de La Marche. He received Saint-Gilles with the title of "count" from his father and displaced his niece Philippa, Duchess of Aquitaine, his brother William IV's daughter, in 1094 from inheriting Toulouse.

In 1094, William Bertrand of Provence died and his margravial title to Provence passed to Raymond. A bull of Urban's dated 22 July 1096 names Raymond comes nimirum Tholosanorum ac Ruthenensium et marchio Provintie Raimundus ("Raymond, count of Toulouse and Rouergue, margrave of Provence").

== The First Crusade ==
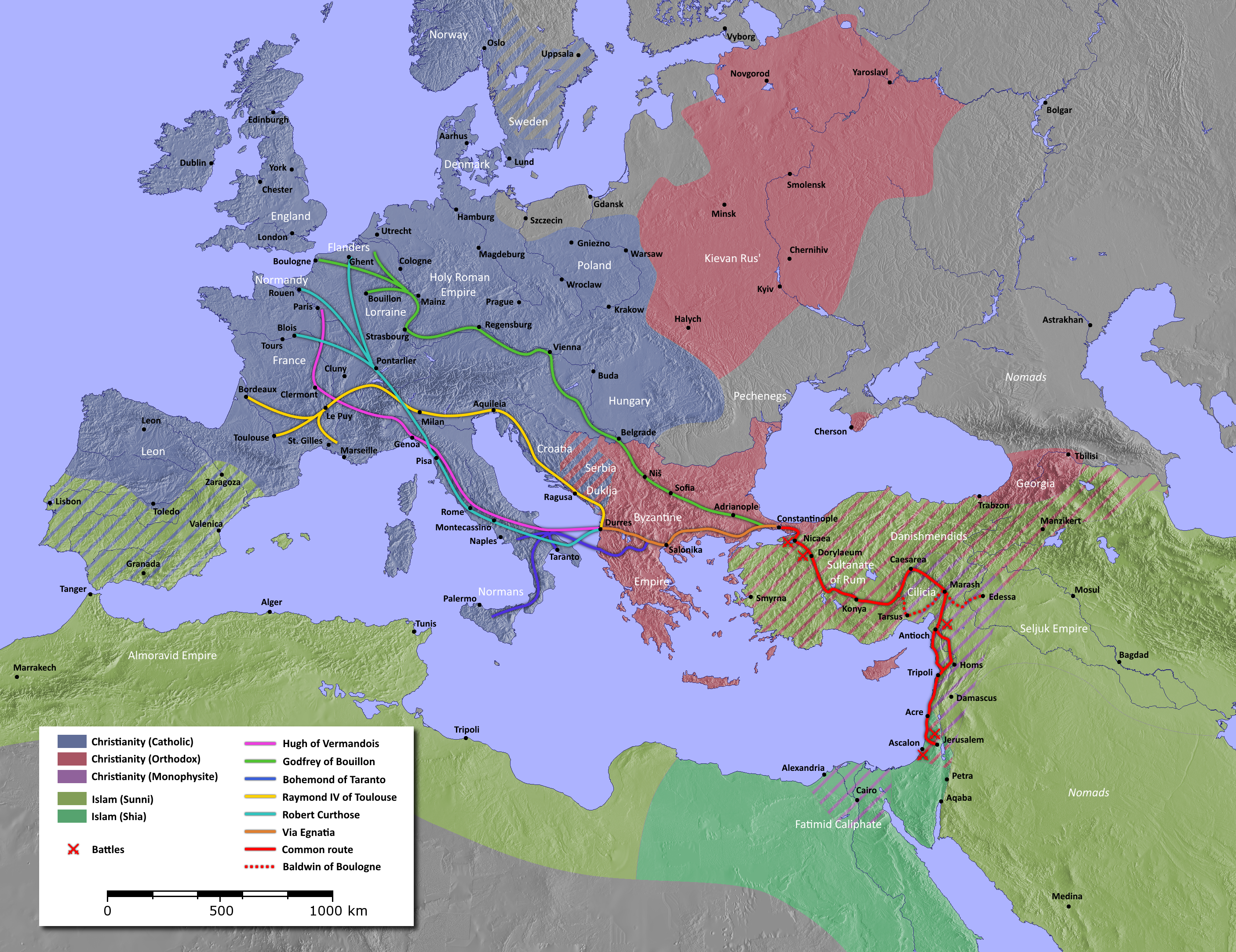
The routes of the First Crusade leaders.

Raymond was deeply religious, and wished to die in the Holy Land, and so when the call was raised for the First Crusade, he was one of the first to take the cross. He is sometimes called "the one-eyed" (monoculus in Latin) after a rumour that he had lost an eye in a scuffle with the doorkeeper of the Church of the Holy Sepulchre during an earlier pilgrimage to Jerusalem. The oldest and the richest of the crusaders, Raymond left Toulouse at the end of October 1096, with a large army and company that included his wife Elvira of Castile, his infant son (who would die on the journey) and Adhemar, bishop of Le Puy, the papal legate. He ignored requests by his niece, Philippa (the rightful heiress to Toulouse) to grant the rule of Toulouse to her in his stead; instead, he left Bertrand, his eldest son, to govern.

According to Raymond of Aguilers's Historia Francorum qui ceperunt Iherusalem, after Raymond's forces took the route through the Alps and Northern Italy, they reached Sclavonia (Kingdom of Croatia) in winter of 1096. Described in biblical terms, for some 40 days passed through the mountains, forests and fog without trade and guide from native population who also attacked army's rear (at the time was a succession crisis in Croatia). To discourage their attacks, he ordered mutilation of six captive Slavs, and Peter Tudebode in Historia de Hierosolymitano itinere wrote that Raymond "lost many noble knights while passing through Sclavonia".

After "strenuous passage across Sclavonia", they entered Shkodër the capital of the kingdom of Duklja where Raymond "affirmed brotherhood and bestowed many gifts upon the king of the Slavs" (Constantine Bodin), but once again were attacked by the Slavs. Then they marched to Dyrrhachium, and then east to Constantinople along the same route used by Bohemond of Taranto. Along the route they confronted Pecheneg and Byzantine mercenaries, capturing cities of Roussa and Rodosto.

At the end of April 1097, he was the only crusade leader not to swear an oath of fealty to Byzantine emperor Alexios I Komnenos. Instead, Raymond swore an oath of friendship, and offered his support against Bohemond, mutual enemy of both Raymond and Alexios. This oath was taken, according to Jonathan Riley-Smith, due to "extreme pressure from other crusade leaders, as well as emperor Alexios". Due to the dualistic nature of the oaths Alexios demanded, one which promised to return former imperial lands to Byzantium and the second of which was an oath of homage and fealty, Raymond most likely found issues with the latter part of the oaths rather than the oath of returning imperial lands. This was because Raymond saw that the oath of fealty conflicted with his crusading vow to serve God. However, according to Riley-Smith, "[d]espite his attitudes toward the oath-taking, after the crusade, Raymond returned to Constantinople and became a strong imperial ally".

He was present at the siege of Nicaea and the Battle of Dorylaeum in 1097, but his first major role came in October 1097 at the siege of Antioch. The crusaders heard a rumour that Antioch had been deserted by the Seljuk Turks, so Raymond sent his army ahead to occupy it, offending Bohemond of Taranto who wanted the city for himself. The city was, however, still occupied, and was taken by the crusaders only after a difficult siege in June 1098. Raymond took the palatium Cassiani (the palace of emir Yaghi-Siyan) and the tower over the Bridge Gate. He was ill during the second siege of Antioch by Kerbogha which culminated in a controversial rediscovery of the Holy Lance by a monk named Peter Bartholomew.

The "miracle" raised the morale of the crusaders, and to their surprise they were able to rout Kerbogha outside Antioch. The Lance itself became a valuable relic among Raymond's followers, despite Adhemar of Le Puy's skepticism and Bohemond's disbelief and occasional mockery. Raymond also refused to relinquish his control of the city to Bohemond, reminding Bohemond that he was obligated to return Antioch to the court of Emperor Alexios, as he had sworn to do. A struggle then arose between Raymond's supporters and the supporters of Bohemond, partly over the genuineness of the Lance, but mostly over the possession of Antioch.

== Extending his territorial reach ==
Many of the minor knights and foot soldiers preferred to continue their march to Jerusalem, and they convinced Raymond to lead them there in the autumn of 1098. Raymond led them out to besiege Maarat al-Numan, although he left a small detachment of his troops in Antioch, where Bohemond also remained. As Adhemar had died in Antioch, Raymond, along with the prestige given to him by the Holy Lance, became the new leader of the crusade. Bohemond however, expelled Raymond's detachment from Antioch in January 1099. Raymond then began to search for a city of his own. He marched from Maarat, which had been captured in December 1098, into the emirate of Tripoli, and began the siege of Arqa on 14 February 1099, apparently with the intent of founding an independent territory in Tripoli that could limit the power of Bohemond to expand the Principality of Antioch to the south.

The siege of Arqa, a town outside Tripoli, lasted longer than Raymond had hoped. Although he successfully captured Hisn al-Akrad, a fortress that would later become the important Krak des Chevaliers, his insistence on taking Tripoli delayed the march to Jerusalem, and he lost much of the support he had gained after Antioch. Raymond finally agreed to continue the march to Jerusalem on 13 May, and after months of siege the city was captured on 15 July. Raymond was offered the crown of the new Kingdom of Jerusalem, but refused, as he was reluctant to rule in the city in which Jesus had suffered. He said that he shuddered to think of being called "King of Jerusalem". It is also likely that he wished to continue the siege of Tripoli rather than remain in Jerusalem. However, he was also reluctant to give up the Tower of David in Jerusalem, which he had taken after the fall of the city, and it was only with difficulty that Godfrey of Bouillon was able to take it from him.

Raymond participated in the battle of Ascalon soon after the capture of Jerusalem, during which an invading army from Egypt was defeated. However, Raymond wanted to occupy Ascalon himself rather than give it to Godfrey, and in the resulting dispute Ascalon remained unoccupied. It was not taken by the crusaders until 1153. Godfrey also blamed him for the failure of his army to capture Arsuf. When Raymond went north, in the winter of 1099–1100, his first act was one of hostility against Bohemond, capturing Laodicea from him (Bohemond had himself recently taken it from Alexios). From Laodicea he went to Constantinople, where he allied with Alexios I, Bohemond's most powerful enemy. Bohemond was at the time attempting to expand Antioch into Byzantine territory, and blatantly refused to fulfill his oath to the Byzantine Empire.

== Crusade of 1101, siege of Tripoli, and death ==
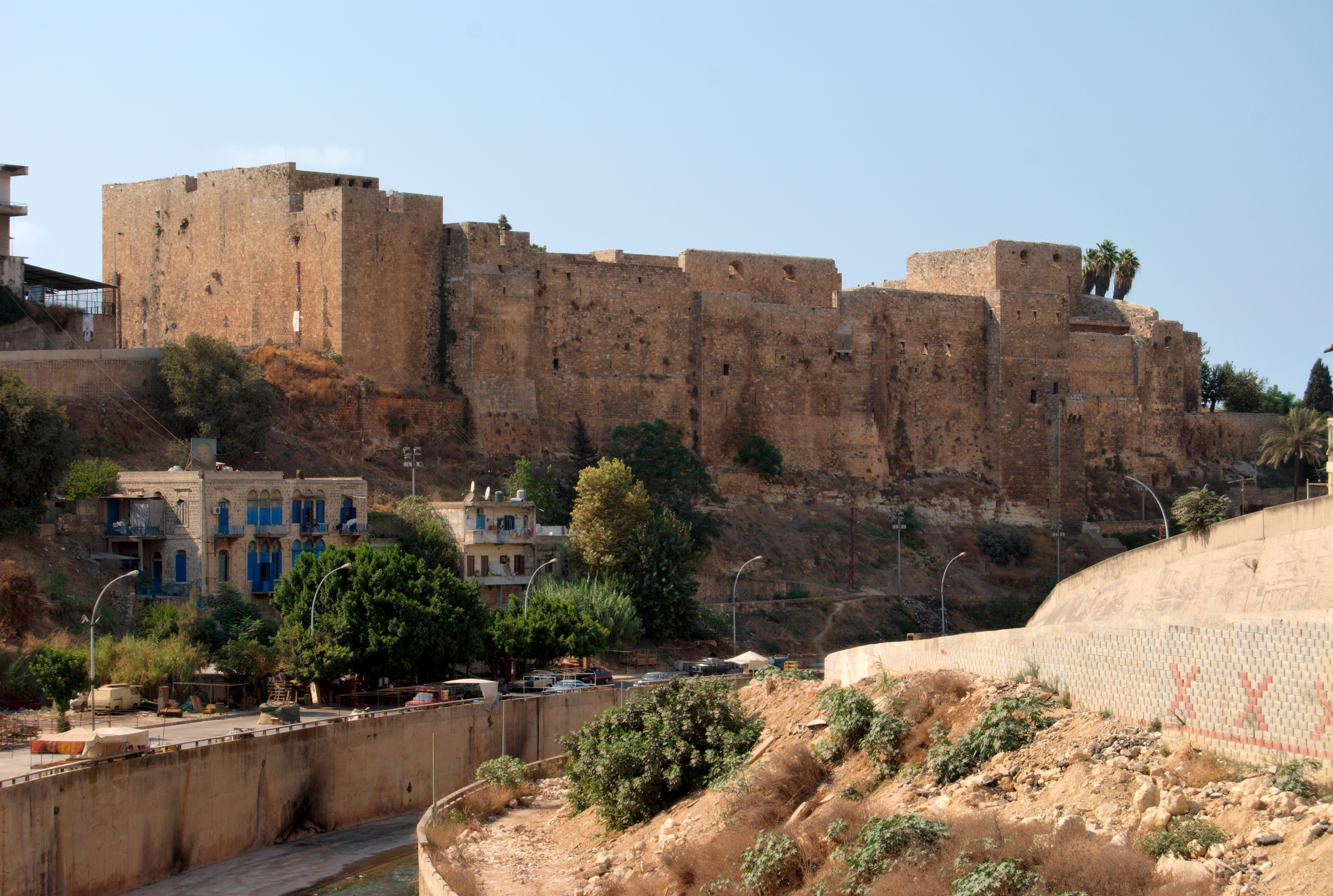
Mons Peregrinus

Raymond was part of the doomed Crusade of 1101, where he was defeated at the Battle of Mersivan in Anatolia. He escaped and returned to Constantinople. In 1102, he travelled by sea from Constantinople to Antioch, where he was imprisoned by Tancred, regent of Antioch during the captivity of Bohemond, and was only dismissed after promising not to attempt any conquests in the country between Antioch and Acre. He immediately broke his promise, attacking and capturing Tartus, and began to build a castle on the Mons Peregrinus ("Pilgrim's Mountain") which would help in his siege of Tripoli. He was aided by Alexius I, who preferred a friendly state in Tripoli to balance the hostile state in Antioch.

The qadi of Tripoli, Fakhr al-Mulk ibn Ammar, led an attack on Mons Peregrinus in September 1104 and set a wing of the citadel on fire. Raymond himself managed to escape across a rooftop, but was badly burned and spent his final months in agony. He died of his injuries on February 28, 1105, before Tripoli was captured.

== Spouses and progeny ==
Raymond IV of Toulouse was married three times, and twice excommunicated for marrying within forbidden degrees of consanguinity by Pope Gregory VII in 1076 and in 1078. These excommunications were lifted in 1080, on the death of his first wife.

His first wife was the daughter of Godfrey I, Count of Arles. Married in 1066, she was repudiated in 1076. Their son was Bertrand.

His second wife was Matilda (Mafalda), the daughter of Count Roger I of Sicily. Married in 1080, Mafalda died in 1094.

Raymond's third wife was Elvira, the illegitimate daughter of King Alfonso VI of León. They married in 1094. Together they had Alfonso Jordan.

Following Raymond's death, his nephew William-Jordan in 1109, with the aid of King Baldwin I of Jerusalem, finally captured Tripoli and established the County of Tripoli. William was deposed in the same year by Raymond's eldest son Bertrand, and the county remained in the possession of the counts of Toulouse throughout the 12th century.

Raymond of Toulouse seems to have been driven both by religious and material motives. On the one hand he accepted the discovery of the Holy Lance and rejected the kingship of Jerusalem, but on the other hand he could not resist the temptation of a new territory. Raymond of Aguilers, a clerk in Raymond's army, wrote an account of the crusade from Raymond's point of view.

== Sources ==
- Barker, Ernest (1911). "Raymund of Toulouse" . In Chisholm, Hugh (ed.). Encyclopædia Britannica. Vol. 22 (11th ed.). Cambridge University Press. pp. 934–935.
- Bréhier, Louis (1913). "Raymond IV, of Saint-Gilles" . In Herbermann, Charles (ed.). Catholic Encyclopedia. Vol. 12. Robert Appleton Company.
- Budak, Neven (2022). "Crusades and Crusading in High Medieval Dalmatia and Croatia - Failed, Abused, Imaginary". In Kersken, Norbert; Srodecki, Paul (eds.). The Expansion of the Faith: Crusading on the Frontiers of Latin Christendom in the High Middle Ages. Brepols. doi:10.1484/M.OUTREMER-EB.5.127515. ISBN 978-2-503-58880-3.
- Déjean, Jean-Luc (1988) [1979]. The Counts of Toulouse (1050–1250). Fayard. ISBN 2213021880.
- Duncalf, Frederic (1969). "The First Crusade: Clermont to Constantinople". In Baldwin, Marshall W. (ed.). The History of the Crusades, Volume I: The First Hundred Years. University of Wisconsin Press. pp. 253–79.
- Edgington, Susan; Sweetenham, Carol, eds. (2011). The Chanson D'Antioche: An Old French Account of the First Crusade. Routledge.
- Graham-Leigh, Elaine (2005). The Southern French Nobility and the Albigensian Crusade. The Boydell Press.
- Ilieva, Annetta; Delev, Mitko (1998). "Sclavonia and Beyond: The Gate to a Different World in the Perception of Crusaders (c. 1104-c. 1208)". In Alan V. Murray (ed.). From Clermont to Jerusalem: The Crusades and Crusader Societies 1095-1500. Brepols. p. 153–171. doi:10.1484/M.IMR-EB.3.4786. ISBN 978-2-503-50667-8.
- Jansen, Katherine L.; Drell, Joanna; Andrews, Frances, eds. (2009). Medieval Italy: Texts in Translation. Translated by Loud, G.A. University of Pennsylvania Press.
- Maalouf, Amin (1983). The Crusades Through Arab Eyes. JC Lattes. ISBN 0-8052-0898-4.
- Oviedo, Bishop Pelayo (2000). "Chapter II:Chronicon Regum Legionensium". The World of El Cid: Chronicles of the Spanish Reconquest. Translated by Barton, Simon; Fletcher, Richard. Manchester University Press.
- Raymond of Aguilers (1968). Historia Francorum Qui Ceperunt Iherusalem. Translated by John Hugh Hill, Laurita I. Hill. Philadelphia: American Philosophical Society. p. 16–18.
- Riley-Smith, Jonathan; Throop, Susanna (2023). The Crusades: A History (4th ed.). Bloomsbury Academic. ISBN 978-1-350-02861-6.
- William of Puylaurens (2003). The Chronicle of William of Puylaurens: The Albigensian Crusade and its Aftermath. Translated by Sibley, W.A.; Sibley, M.D. The Boydell Press.

Preceded by William IV	Count of Toulouse; 1094–1098	Succeeded by Philippa
