= White Brotherhood =

Urban society (or militia) of Toulouse established in 1211

The White Brotherhood (French: Fraternité Blanche) was a confraternity (or militia) of Toulouse established in 1210 by Bishop Folquet (also written as Fulk), so-called from its members' habit of wearing white crosses on their chests. The society, called a "pious institution" by William of Puylaurens, was militant towards usurers (Jews) and Cathars, robbing them and destroying their homes.

== Background ==
At the start of the thirteenth century, Toulouse had a population of 30,000, making it one of the largest and also wealthiest cities in the area. It also was functionally independant. The count of Toulouse had little power, most of it resting in consuls and capitols (often the elites). The city had been under some strain with Pope Innocent III. The count of Toulouses' territories were rife with heresy and one of the pope's Legates had been assassinated by the Count of Toulouse Raymond VI. Under these circumstances, Pope Innocent III launched the Albigensian Crusade in 1208. The city was put under interdict until 1210 when the new bishop of Toulouse Folquet de Marselha, in power since 1206, negotiated to pay a fine to relieve the ban. He created the White Brotherhood in 2010 to improve the Toulousian's relationship with the church and the crusade, to receive crusade indulgence, and to persecute usurers and heretics. There were four leaders of the confraternity: Aimeric of Castelnau, Arnaud of Castelnau, Peter of Saint-Rome, and Arnaud Bernard. They were all consuls of Toulouse, which popularized the brotherhood within the city. Most of the Whites came from the city proper. They wore white robes and crosses (or robes with white crosses) and focused their efforts on leading processions, attacking heretics, splitting up property owned by usurers, and destroying the homes of both.

== Conflict With the Black Brotherhood ==
A Black Brotherhood, so-called in opposition to the White, was soon formed and the two factions went to war in the streets of Toulouse. According to Puylaurens:

Daily the two parties would clash, banners flying, bristling with weapons, even with cavalry in evidence. Through the agency of His servant the bishop, Our Lord came to bring them, not a bad peace but a good war.

== Involvement with the Siege of Lavaur ==
From the White Brotherhood Folquet selected 500 men-at-arms and sent them to aid the Albigensian Crusade in besieging Lavaur. The bishop even composed pro-Crusade sirventes for the troops to sing. Count Raymond VII, however, forbade the citizens to go and tried to force Folquet from the city. The White Brotherhood did go, however, and the bishop eventually left as well, to join the siege at Lavaur.

The White Brotherhood gained notoriety among the opponents of the Crusade. The troubadour Gavaudan wrote the song A la plus longa nuech de l'an in which he criticises the "foolish white people", which could either be a reference to the Whites of Toulouse or abbot of Citeaux Arnold Amalric.
