= Raymond I of Toulouse =

Raymond I (died 865) was the Count of Limoges (from 841), Rouergue and Quercy (from 849), and Toulouse and Albi (from 852). He was the younger son of Fulcoald of Rouergue and Senegund, niece of William of Gellone through his sister Alda.

In 852, on the death of his brother Fredelo, Raymond, already count of Limoges, Quercy, and Rouergue, received Toulouse and Albi. In 862, he was attacked by Humfrid, Count of Barcelona, and forced to abdicate Limoges. In 863, he was likewise forced to abdicate Rouergue and Toulouse. He died in 865 while fighting for his possessions against the new count Sunifred I.

Raymond married Bertha and had five children:

- Bernard II, count of Toulouse, Rouergue, Quercy, Albi, and Nîmes
- Foucher de Limoges, viscount of Limoges
- Odo, count of Toulouse, Rouergue, and Quercy and duke of Septimania
- Aribert, abbot of Vabres
- a daughter who married Lupo I of Bigorre
