= Alfonso Jordan =

Crusader nobleman (1103–1148)

- Count of Toulouse, Rouergue, and Tripoli, Margrave of Provence, and Duke of Narbonne
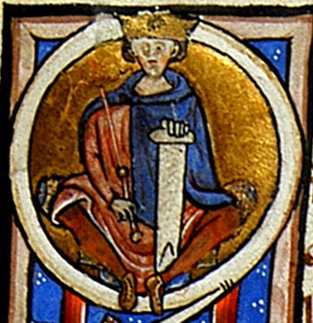
- Alfonso Jordan, on a historiated initial from the first cartulary of the city of Toulouse, 1205

Count of Tripoli
- Reign: 1105 – 1109
- Predecessor: Raymond IV
- Successor: Bertrand

Count of Toulouse
- Reign: 1112 – 1148
- Predecessor: Bertrand
- Successor: Raymond V
- Born: 1103; Citadel of Raymond de Saint-Gilles, Tripoli
- Died: 16 April 1148 (aged 44–45); Caesarea, Kingdom of Jerusalem
- Spouse: Faydiva d'Uzes (m. Sep 1125)
- Issue: Raymond V Alfonso II of Toulouse; Faydiva; Bertrand
- Father: Raymond IV
- Mother: Elvira of Castile

Alfonso Jordan (1103 – 16 April 1148), also spelled Alfons Jordan or Alphonse Jourdain , was the Count of Tripoli (1105–09), Count of Rouergue (1109–48), and Count of Toulouse, Margrave of Provence and Duke of Narbonne (1112–48).

== Life ==
Alfonso was the son of Raymond IV of Toulouse by his third wife, Elvira of Castile. He was born in the castle of Mont Pèlerin in Tripoli while his father was on the First Crusade. He was given the name "Jourdain" after being baptised in the Jordan River. Alfonso's father died when he was two years old and he remained under the guardianship of his cousin, William Jordan, Count of Cerdagne, until he was five. He was then taken to Europe, where his half-brother Bertrand had given him the county of Rouergue. Upon Bertrand's death in 1112, Alfonso succeeded to the county of Toulouse and marquisate of Provence.

In 1114, Duke William IX of Aquitaine, who claimed Toulouse by right of his wife Philippa, daughter of Count William IV, invaded the county and conquered it. Alfonso recovered a part in 1119, but he was not in full control until 1123. When at last successful, he was excommunicated by Pope Callixtus II for having damaged the abbey of Saint-Gilles and assaulting the monks.

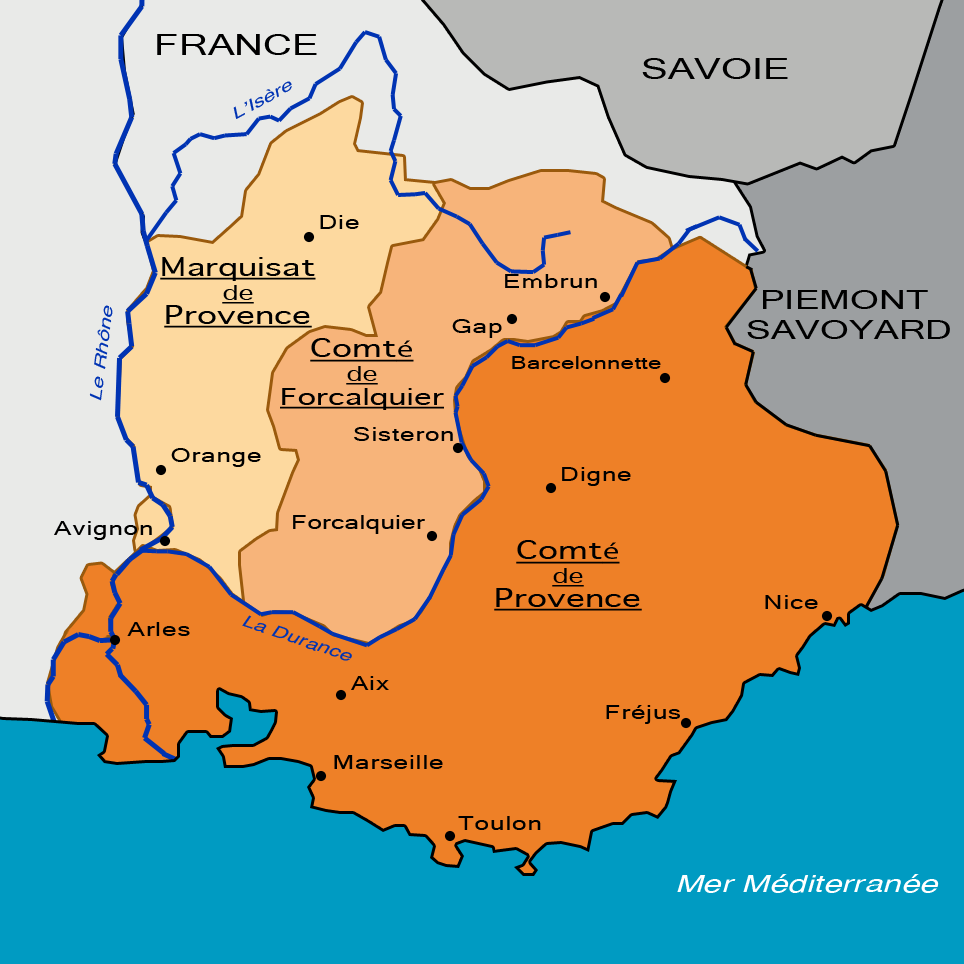
Division of Provence obtained by Alfonso Jordan in 1125. He ruled the marquisate.

Alfonso next had to fight for his rights in Provence against Count Raymond Berengar III of Barcelona. Not until September 1125 did their war end in "peace and concord" (pax et concordia). At this stage, Alfonso was master of the regions lying between the Pyrenees and the Alps, the Auvergne and the sea. His ascendancy was, according to one commentator, an unmixed good to the country, for during a period of fourteen years art and industry flourished.

In March 1126, Alfonso was at the court of King Alfonso VII of León when he acceded to the throne. According to the Chronica Adefonsi imperatoris, Alfonso and Suero Vermúdez took the city of León from opposition magnates and handed it over to Alfonso VII. Among those who may have accompanied Alfonso on one of his many extended stays in Spain was the troubadour Marcabru.

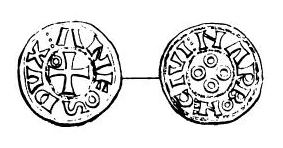
A denier minted at Narbonne during the minority of Ermengard (1134–43) bearing the obverse inscription DUX ANFOS and on the reverse CIVI NARBON

By 1132, Alfonso was embroiled in a succession war over the county of Melgueil against Count Berengar Raymond of Provence. This brief conflict was resolved with Alfonso's defeat and Berengar marrying Beatrice, heiress of Melgueil.

Alfonso seized the viscounty of Narbonne in 1134, and ruled it during the minority of Viscountess Ermengarde, only restoring it to her in 1143. In 1141 King Louis VII of France pressed the claim of his wife, Eleanor of Aquitaine, granddaughter of Philippa, even besieging Toulouse, but without result. That same year Alfonso Jordan was again in Spain, making a pilgrimage to Saint James of Compostela, when he proposed a peace between the king of León and García Ramírez of Navarre, which became the basis for subsequent negotiations.

In 1144, Alfonso again incurred the displeasure of the church by siding with the citizens of Montpellier against their lord. In 1145, Bernard of Clairvaux addressed a letter to him full of concern about a heretic named Henry in the diocese of Toulouse. Bernard even went there to preach against the heresy, an early expression of Catharism. A second time he was excommunicated; but in 1146 he took the cross (i.e., vowed to go on crusade) at a meeting in Vézelay called by Louis VII. In August 1147, he embarked for the near east on the Second Crusade. He lingered on the way in Italy and probably in Constantinople, where he may have met Emperor Manuel I.

Alfonso finally arrived at Acre in 1148. He died at Caesarea, which was followed by accusations of poisoning, levelled against either Eleanor of Aquitaine or Melisende of Jerusalem, who may have wanted to eliminate him as a rival to her brother-in-law Count Raymond II of Tripoli.

Alfonso and Faydiva d'Uzès had:

1. Raymond, who succeeded him
2. Alfonso II
3. Faydiva (died 1154), married to Count Humbert III of Savoy
4. Agnes (died 1187)
5. Laurentia, who married Count Bernard III of Comminges

He also had an illegitimate son, Bertrand.

== Sources ==
- Barton, Simon (1997). The Aristocracy in Twelfth-century León and Castile. Cambridge University Press.
- Barton, Simon; Fletcher, Richard, eds. (2000). The world of El Cid: Chronicles of the Spanish Reconquest. Manchester University Press.
- Benito Ruano, Eloy (1987). "Alfonso Jordán, Conde de Toulouse: un nieto de Alfonso VI de Castilla". Estudios sobre Alfonso VI y la reconquista de Toledo. Toledo. pp. 83–98.
- Benito Ruano, Eloy (2018), "Alfonso Jordán", Diccionario Biográfico electrónico, Real Academia de la Historia
- Boissonade, Pierre (1922). "Les personnages et les événements de l'histoire d'Allemagne, de France et d'Espagne dans l'oeuvre de Marcabru (1129–50)". Romania. 48: 207–242. doi:10.3406/roma.1922.4480.
- Cheyette, Fredric L. (2004). Ermengard of Narbonne and the World of the Troubadours. Cornell University Press.
- This article incorporates text from a publication now in the public domain: Chisholm, Hugh, ed. (1911). "Alphonse I.". Encyclopædia Britannica. Vol. 1 (11th ed.). Cambridge University Press. p. 733.
- Graham-Leigh, Elaine (2005). The Southern French Nobility and the Albigensian Crusade. The Boydell Press.
- Hill, John Hugh; Hill, Laurita Lyttleton (1962). Raymond IV, Count of Toulouse. Syracuse University Press.
- Kelly, Amy (1978). Eleanor of Aquitaine and the Four Kings (2nd ed.). Harvard University Press.
- Kosto, Adam (2001). Making Agreements in Medieval Catalonia: Power, Order, and the Written Word, 1000–1200. Cambridge University Press.
- Lewis, Kevin James (2017). The Counts of Tripoli and Lebanon in the Twelfth Century: Sons of Saint-Gilles. Routledge.
- Mundy, John Hine (1997). Society and Government at Toulouse in the Age of the Cathars. Pontifical Institute for Medieval Studies.
- Reilly, Bernard F. (1998). The Kingdom of León-Castilla Under King Alfonso VII, 1126–1157. University of Pennsylvania Press.
- Richard, Jean (1999). The Crusades, c.1071-c.1291. Translated by Birrell, Jean. Cambridge University Press.
- Selwood, Dominic (1999). Knights of the Cloister: Templars and Hospitallers in Central-Southern Occitania, c. 1100-c. 1300. The Boydell Press.
- Tyerman, Christopher (2007). God's War: A New History of the Crusades. Penguin Group.156
- Wakefield, Walter Leggett; Evans, Austin Patterson (1991). Heresies of the High Middle Ages. Columbia University Press.

Preceded by Raymond I	Count of Tripoli; 1105–1109	Succeeded by Bertrand
Preceded by Bertrand	Count of Toulouse; 1112–1148	Succeeded by Raymond V
