= Ermengol of Rouergue =

French noble (870–937)

Ermengol (or Ermengaud) (870-937) was a son of Odo of Toulouse and Garsindis. His father gave him the County of Rouergue and Quercy in 906 and he governed it to his death. His brother was Raymond II of Toulouse and together they governed the vast patrimony of their house in the first half of the tenth century.

In 930, he donated property to the abbey of Vabres in a charter dated to the seventh year of King Rudolph bearing only the title of comes (count). In January 932, he made a similar donation with the title of princeps (prince). He was probably regarded as princeps Gothiae, a title which was to run in his family in the tenth century. He and his nephew Raymond Pons of Toulouse, together with Sancho IV of Gascony, went to the court of Rudolph that year to do homage for their lands. This did not have the desired effect, however, of satisfying royal desires for influence in the south and Rudolph accompanied Ebalus of Aquitaine against the Vikings a short while later, strengthening the Ramnulfid dynasty against that of the Rouergue in the fight for supremacy in Aquitaine.

Ermengol and his wife Adelais (Adalaiz) had two known sons and one daughter, though charters of his eldest son indicate that he had other sons besides his two heirs. The eldest son was Raymond, who inherited Rouergue, and the second was Hugh, who received Quercy. His daughter is hypothesized to have married Sunifred II, Count of Barcelona.

== Sources ==
- Lewis, Archibald R. The Development of Southern French and Catalan Society, 718–1050. University of Texas Press: Austin, 1965.
