= Fredelo =

French noble

Fredelo, Fridolo, or Frigidolo (died 852) was the first Count of Toulouse (844–852) of the dynasty of Rouergue.

Son of Fulcoald of Rouergue and Senegund, daughter of Alda, sister of William of Gellone, Fredelo was related to the families of the counts of Rouergue and Toulouse.

In 840, Fulcoald died, but Fredelo was not confirmed as his successor in Rouergue. But when Bernard of Septimania was captured by Charles the Bald for rebellion against his lord and executed in 844, the king bestowed his county of Toulouse on Fredelo. Pepin II of Aquitaine, who was leading the revolt against Charles, appointed Bernard's heir William to the county of Toulouse. Of the two claimants to Toulouse, William had the upper hand. In 849, however, William was in Barcelona and Charles invaded Aquitaine. Fredelo, then in control of Toulouse, taking advantage of William's absence, opened the gates of the city to his sovereign and was reconfirmed in his possession of it.

Fredelo received the County of Carcassonne in 850 and died in 852, leaving his titles to his brother Raymond. By his wife Oda, he left one daughter named Udalgarda who married Bernard Plantapilosa.
