= Duke of Narbonne =

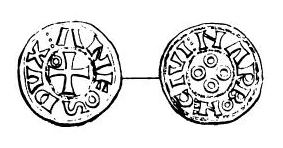
Denier minted in Narbonne by Alfonso Jordan, count of Toulouse, during his occupation of the city (1134/39-1143) and the minority of the heiress Ermengarde, bearing the obverse inscription DUX ANFOS ("Duke Alfonso ") and on the reverse CIVI NARBON ("City of Narbonne"), clear affirmation of the Toulouse claims

The title Duke of Narbonne (dux Narbonensis) was a title employed at various times by the overlords of Narbonne, while the direct power in the city was held by the viscounts. The prestige of the title probably attached to the fact that Narbonne had been a capital of the ancient Roman administration of the eponymous province of Gallia Narbonensis.

On the death of his cousin Bertha of Rouergue in 1065, William IV of Toulouse inherited the county of Narbonne. His brother and successor, Raymond IV, elevated the status to that of duke. Raymond's son and successor, Alfonso Jordan, also employed the title with royal approval (as Amphusus dux Narbonensis provincie) and his son, Raymond V placed it first before his other titles as an implication of its importance (probably related to its Roman connection). The family was only dispossessed of the title when Raymond VI brought down the wrath of the French king for his supposed support of Cathar heresies.

In 1215, following the successes of the Albigensian Crusade, Philip II of France granted Simon IV de Montfort, already Earl of Leicester, the titles of Duke of Narbonne and Count of Toulouse. Arnauld Amaury, then Archbishop of Narbonne, also claimed the ducal dignity and entered a dispute with Simon which was not resolved before the latter's death (1218). The title thenceforth belonged to the archdiocese.

== Sources ==
- Cheyette, Fredric L. Ermengard of Narbonne and the World of the Troubadours. Cornell University Press: Ithaca, 2001.
- Lauer, Philippe. Robert Ier et Raoul de Bourgogne, rois de France (923-936). 1910.
