= Monflanquin =

- Commune
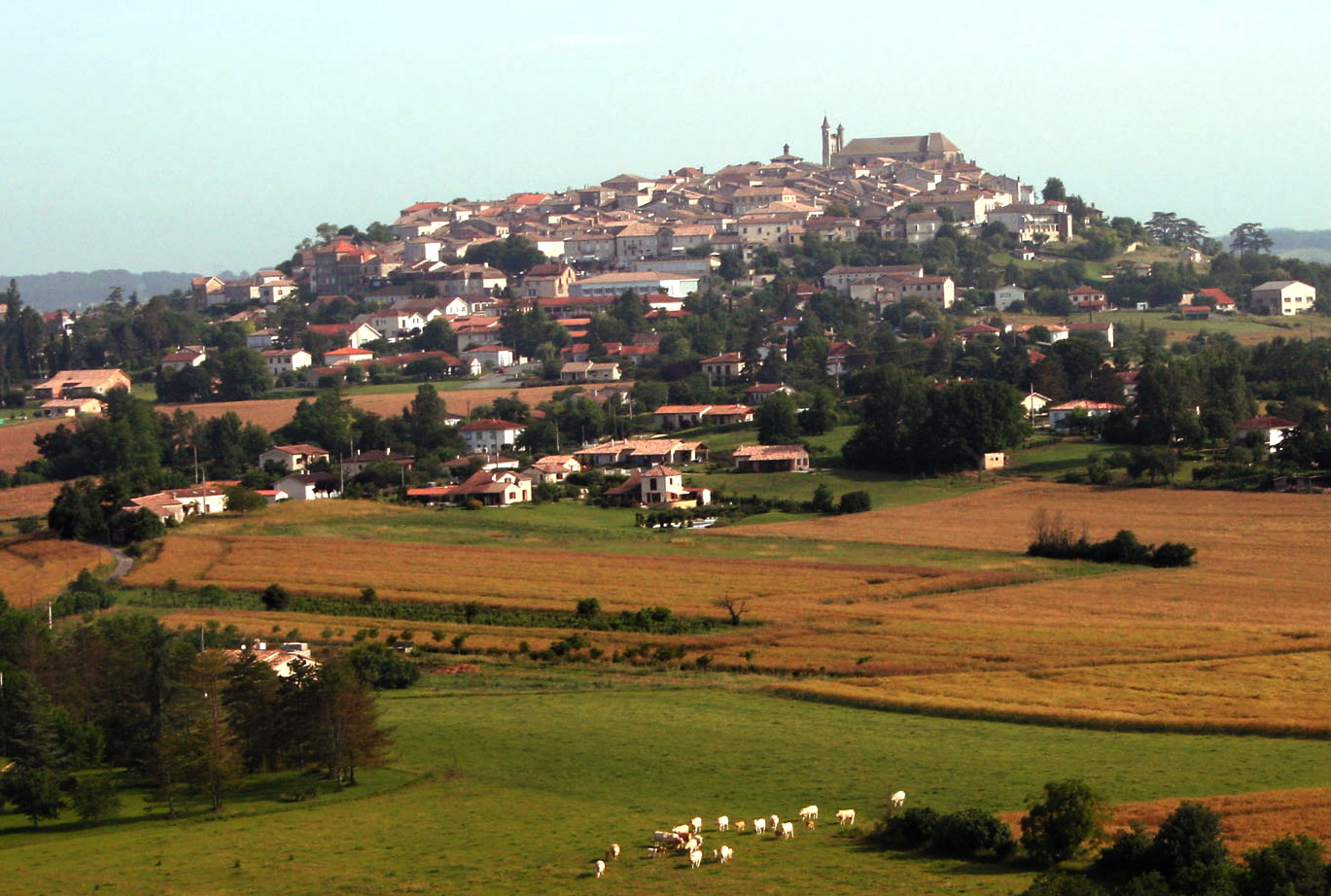
- A general view of Monflanquin

- Coat of arms
- Location of Monflanquin
- Location within France Location within Nouvelle-Aquitaine
- Coordinates: 44°31′59″N 0°46′07″E
- Country: France
- Region: Nouvelle-Aquitaine
- Department: Lot-et-Garonne
- Arrondissement: Villeneuve-sur-Lot
- Canton: Le Haut agenais Périgord
- Intercommunality: Bastides en Haut-Agenais Périgord

Government
  - Mayor (2020–2026): Nathalie Founaud-Veysset
- Area^{1}: 62.21 km^{2} (24.02 sq mi)
- Elevation: 181 m (594 ft)
- Highest elevation: 207 m (679 ft)
- Lowest elevation: 64 m (210 ft)
- Population (2023): 2,342
  - Density: 37.65/km^{2} (97.50/sq mi)
- Time zone: UTC+01:00 (CET)
  - Summer (DST): UTC+02:00 (CEST)
- INSEE/Postal code: 47175 /47150
- ^{1} French Land Register data, which excludes lakes, ponds, glaciers > 1 km^{2} (0.386 sq mi or 247 acres) and river estuaries.

Monflanquin (French pronunciation: [mɔ̃flɑ̃kɛ̃]; Languedocien: Montflanquin) is a commune in the Lot-et-Garonne department in south-western France. Built in 1256 as a military bastide town on a strategic north–south route, it changed hands several times during the Hundred Years' War.

The village is a member of the Les Plus Beaux Villages de France ("The most beautiful villages of France") association.

== History ==
In 1252, Guillaume Amanieu, Lord of Calviac (in Monflanquin), ceded the Monflanquin mountain to Alphonse of Poitiers. The latter founded a Bastide there in the 13th century. Based on our current knowledge, everything suggests that the "Monflanquin mountain" was ceded to Alphonse of Poitiers without paréage. In 1256, Alphonse of Poitiers began the foundation of the fortified town. In 1269, the foundation charter was confirmed. When Alphonse of Poitiers died after his wife, Jeanne of Toulouse, daughter of Raymond VII of Toulouse, without an heir, his lands became part of the royal domain of Philip III.

In 1279, Monflanquin became one of the twelve bailiwicks of the Agenais. The Archbishop of Bordeaux, Bertrand de Got, visited the town in 1304. He was elected Pope the following year under the name Clement V. The fortified town having come under English influence, King Edward III of England confirmed the town's privileges in 1318. In 1374, the inhabitants of Monflanquin aided the French King's army, which was heading towards Tonneins to drive the English out of the Agenais.

On 31 August 1574, Guy de Montferrand, lord of Langoiran, governor of Périgord "for those of the reformed religion" and Geoffroy de Vivans took the town with 2000 men and took 125 gentlemen prisoner. The town was the capital of the Monflanquin district from 1790 to 1795.

From 1911 to 1933, the commune was the operating center of the Tramways de Lot-et-Garonne, a meter-gauge secondary railway company that constituted the Lot-et-Garonne departmental network.

== Demography ==
Historical population
Year	Pop.	±% p.a.
1968	2,354	—
1975	2,368	+0.08%
1982	2,356	−0.07%
1990	2,431	+0.39%
1999	2,258	−0.82%
2007	2,342	+0.46%
2012	2,345	+0.03%
2017	2,313	−0.27%
2023	2,342	+0.21%
Source: INSEE

== Notable people ==
- Louis Couffignal (1902–1966), mathematician and cybernetics pioneer
- Pierre Charles Fournier de Saint-Amant (1800 - 1872), chess player

== See also ==
- Communes of the Lot-et-Garonne department
