= Treaty of Amiens (1279) =

1279 treaty between France and England

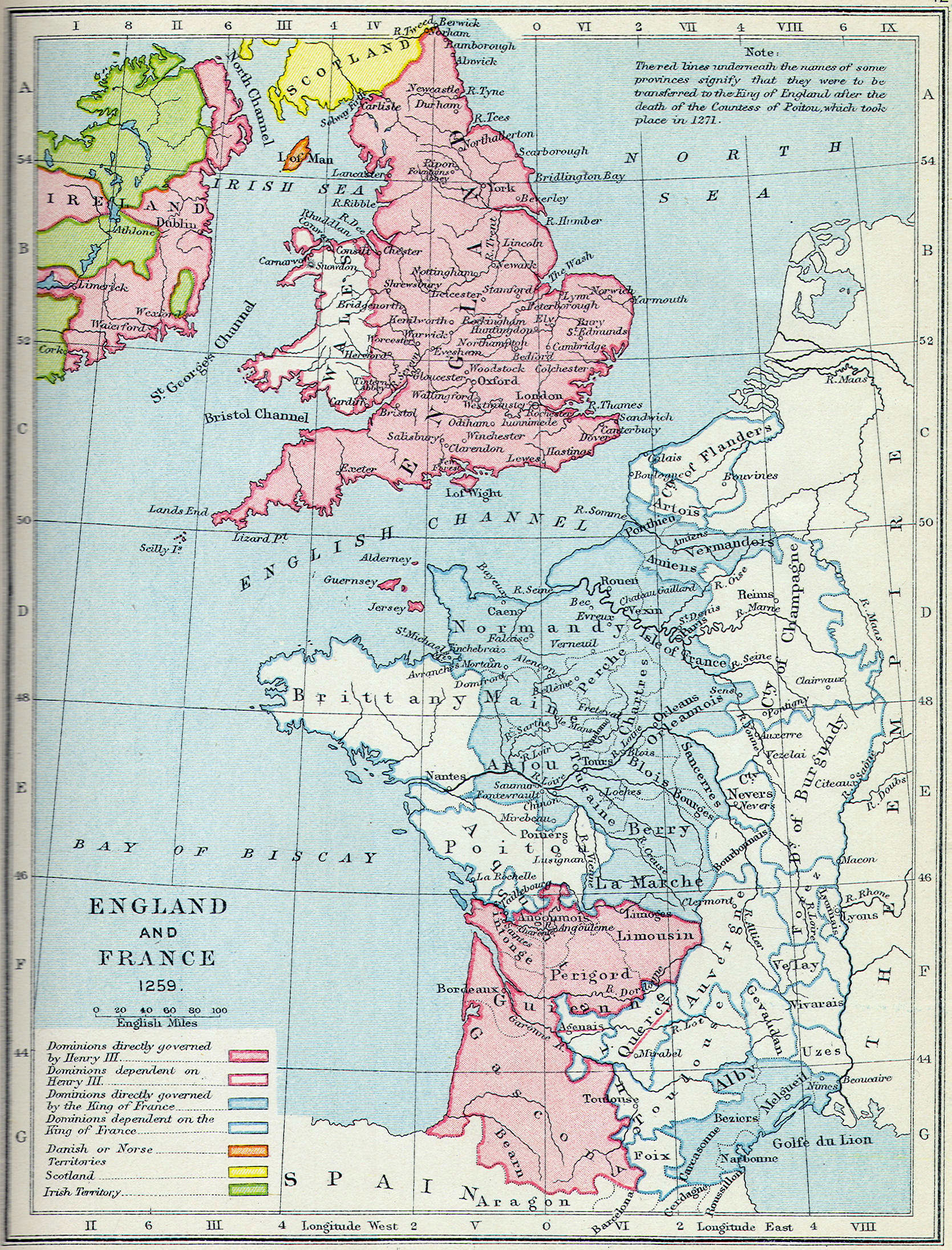
The English Angevin Empire and France after the 1259 Treaty of Paris and 1271 deaths of the Count and Countess of Poitou.

The Treaty of Amiens was signed by King Philip III of France and King Edward I of England in Amiens, Picardy, on 23 May 1279. It principally concerned control of the borderlands between the French royal demesne and the English possessions in Aquitaine, particularly Agenais, Quercy, and Saintonge.

== Background ==
The 1229 Treaty of Paris put an end to the conflict between the King of France, Louis IX, and the Count of Toulouse, Raymond VII, and provided for the marriage of the latter's daughter, Joan of Toulouse, to King Louis' brother, Alphonse of Poitiers. In the event that they did not have heirs, their estates were to revert to the Crown of France. Among these estates, some, such as Agenais and Quercy, were originally part of the dowry that Joan of England, sister of King Richard I of England, brought when she married count Raymond VI of Toulouse in October 1196.

The 1259 Treaty of Paris signed between King Louis IX and Henry III, King of England, had provided that, in the event that Joan of Toulouse did not have an heir, the estates brought by her grandmother, Joan of England, would return to the English Crown. Henry III had also raised claims to Quercy and Saintonge, but they had not been settled.

In August 1271 Joan of Toulouse and Alphonse of Poitiers died a few days apart without heirs. As soon as their deaths were known, Philip III declared himself the owner of all their domains, including those which were supposed to go to King Henry III.

== Principal clauses ==
After the death of Henry III, negotiations between Philip III and Edward I continued for some time before reaching an agreement:

- By this treaty, King Philip III of France confirmed the clauses of the 1259 Treaty of Paris.
- Philip III ceded the Agenais to the King of England and renounced the possession of Saintonge.
- The English claim to Quercy was left open for future negotiations.

== Consequences ==
The lords of Agenais took an oath of loyalty to the King of England on April 9, 1279, in the church of the Jacobins in Agen. In 1286, an agreement was reached whereby Quercy was yielded to King Philip IV in exchange for an annual payment by the king of France to the king of England for the occupation.

Continuing tensions and unresolved issues lead to the 1294–1303 Gascon War.
