= Cesar Conde (artist) =

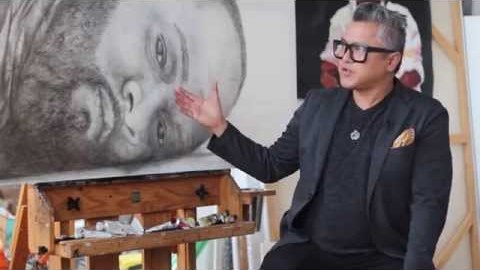
- Cesar Conde
- Born: September 23, 1963 (age 62); Philippines

Cesar Conde (born September 23, 1963) is a Filipino-born American artist. He came to Seattle in the early 1970s, when his family emigrated to the United States. Both his parents were white-collar professionals. Conde went to a public school in Seattle and was part of the first busing integration program. However, his first year of schooling was in Chicago's west side, where he was exposed to African-American, Latino and Polish communities. He grew up pressured to assimilate in the American culture in order to survive.

Travel exposed Conde to different cultures, which is reflected in his art. He learned to draw in Florence, Italy and studied painting in Monflanquin, France.

== Exhibitions ==
Southside Weekly said "Conde's art is art that does, and when looking at his portraits, one cannot help but feel that art can and must do things for us, that it must be strong, not flimsy. Indeed, that is Conde's whole goal: to remind us of the hard truths under the surface of our biases and judgments, lest we forget what happened to Trayvon," Jake Bittle, November 20, 2013

His work is featured in the Chicago Contemporary.
