= Guyenne =

Medieval Duchy in Kingdom of France

Coordinates: 43.977°N 0.176°W

France in 1477, when Guyenne (southwest) was a part of the royal domain

The gouvernement général of Guyenne and Gascony in 1733

Guyenne or Guienne (/ɡiˈjɛn/ ghee-YEN, French: [ɡɥijɛn]; Occitan: Guiana [ˈɡjanɔ]) was an old French province which corresponded roughly to the Roman province of Aquitania Secunda and the Catholic archdiocese of Bordeaux.

== Name ==
The name "Guyenne" comes from Aguyenne, a popular transformation of Aquitania. In the 12th century it formed, along with Gascony, the duchy of Aquitaine, which passed under the dominion of the kings of England by the marriage of Eleanor of Aquitaine to Henry II.

== History ==
In the 13th century, as a result of the conquests of Philip II, Louis VIII and Louis IX, Guyenne was confined within the narrower limits fixed by the 1259 Treaty of Paris and became distinct from Aquitaine. Guyenne then comprised the Bordelais (the old countship of Bordeaux), the Bazadais, part of Périgord, Limousin, Quercy and Rouergue, and the Agenais ceded by Philip III to Edward I in the 1279 Treaty of Amiens. Still united with Gascony, it formed a duchy extending from the Charente River to the Pyrenees mountains. This duchy was held as a fief on the terms of homage to the French kings and, both in 1296 and 1324, it was confiscated by the kings of France on the ground that there had been a failure in the feudal duties.

By the 1360 Treaty of Brétigny, King Edward III of England acquired the full sovereignty of the duchy of Guyenne, together with Aunis, Saintonge, Angoumois, and Poitou. Soon after, the victories of Bertrand du Guesclin and Gaston III, Count of Foix, restored the duchy to its 13th-century limits. In 1451, it was conquered and finally united to the French crown by Charles VII. In 1469, Louis XI gave it in exchange for the territories of Champagne and Brie to his brother Charles, Duke of Berry, after whose death in 1472 it again became part of the royal domain.

Guyenne then formed a government (gouvernement général) which from the 17th century onwards was united with Gascony. In 1779, Louis XVI convened the provincial assemblies of Guyenne and considered expanding the assembly to other provinces, but abandoned this idea after experiencing the opposition of the privileged classes in Guyenne. The government of Guyenne and Gascony (Guienne et Gascogne), with its capital at Bordeaux, lasted until the end of the Ancien Régime in 1792. Under the French Revolution, the departments formed from Guyenne proper were those of Gironde, Lot-et-Garonne, Dordogne, Lot, Aveyron and the chief part of Tarn-et-Garonne.

== See also ==
- Guyenne War
