= Château d'Eymet =

Castle in Eymet, France

Coordinates: 44°40′07″N 0°23′48″E

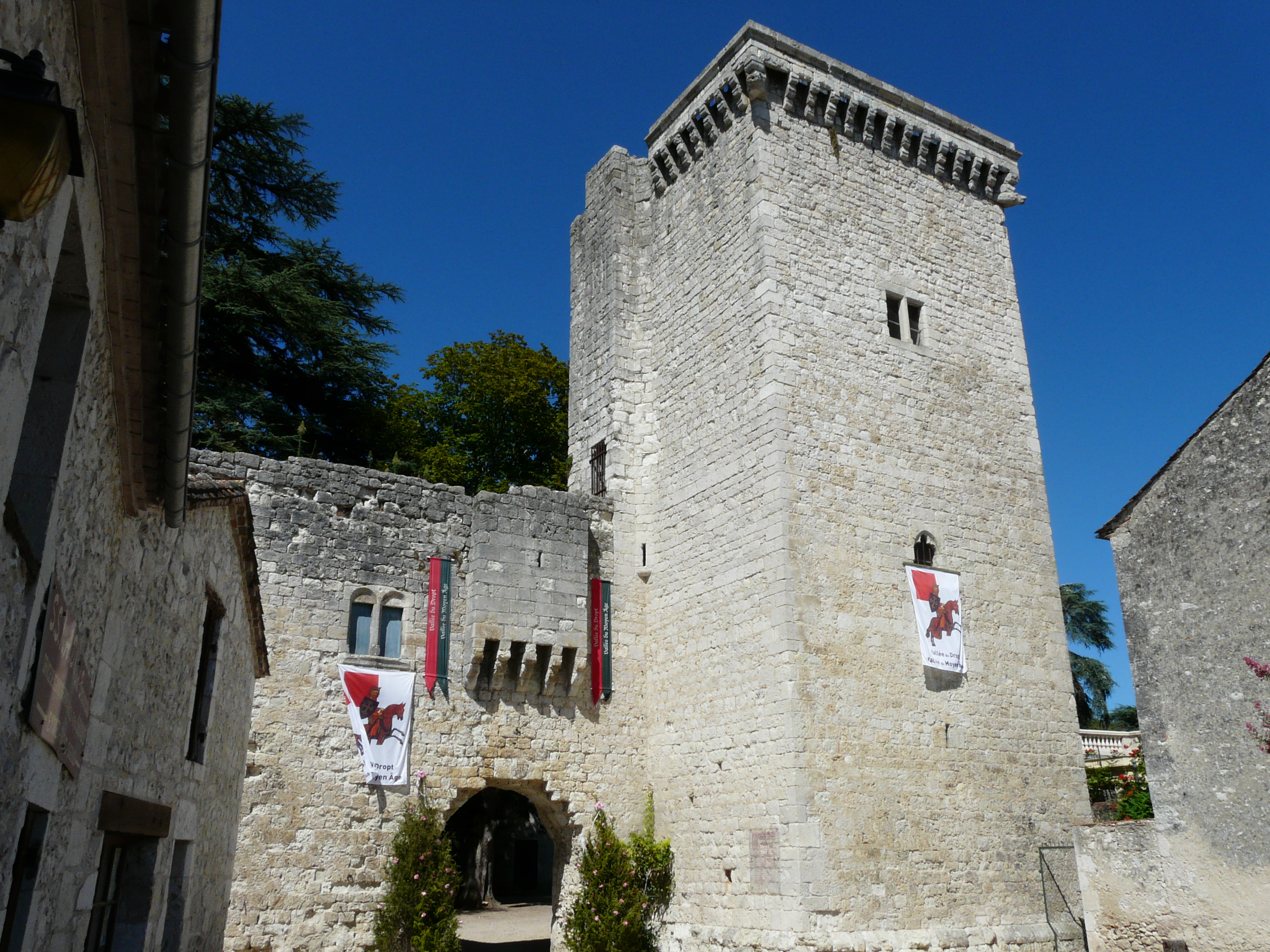
Château d'Eymet

Château d'Eymet is a castle in the commune of Eymet in the Dordogne département of France.

== Location ==
The castle is located inside and on the northwest edge of the bastide of Eymet, less than 100 metres from the Dropt river.

== History ==
The castle was built in the 13th century, before the creation of the bastide and was integrated into its enceinte.

In 1377, the troops of Bertrand du Guesclin took the castle from the English.

The house was rebuilt in the 19th century.

Part of the castle was transformed into a museum in 1963.

== Protection ==
Parts of the castle have been protected since 1994 as a monument historique by the French Ministry of Culture.

== Architecture ==
The north and west sides face the outside of the bastide and are protected by an enceinte and, to the north, by a gate surmounted by a defence post.

The east and the south sides look inside the bastide. The eastern side has a 19th century dwelling. To the south, the defensive enclosure is imposing, with an échauguette at the western corner, and in its centre the access door surmounted by a bretèche. To the east is a massive square keep, the Monseigneur Tower.

== Gallery ==
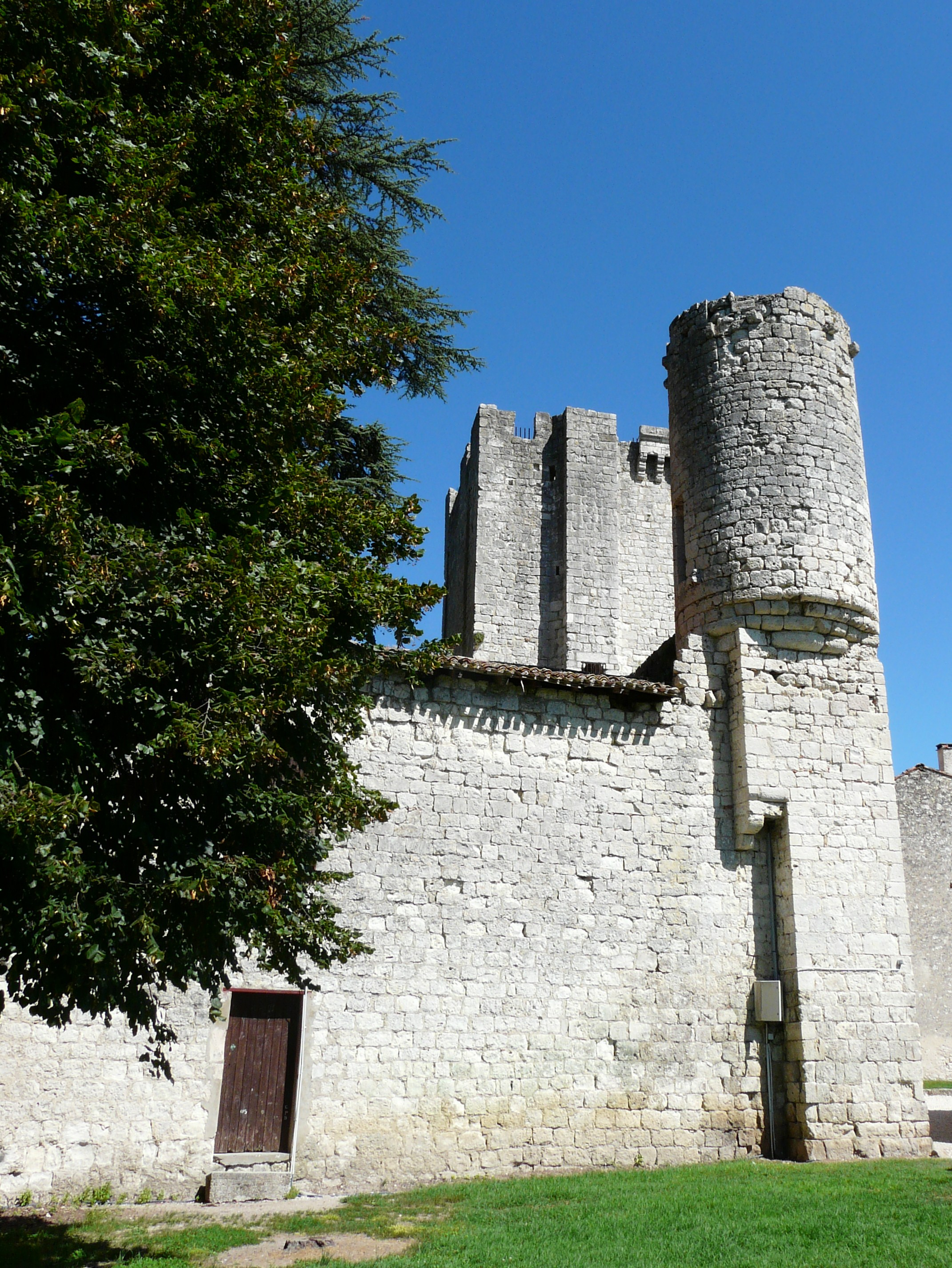
The échauguette

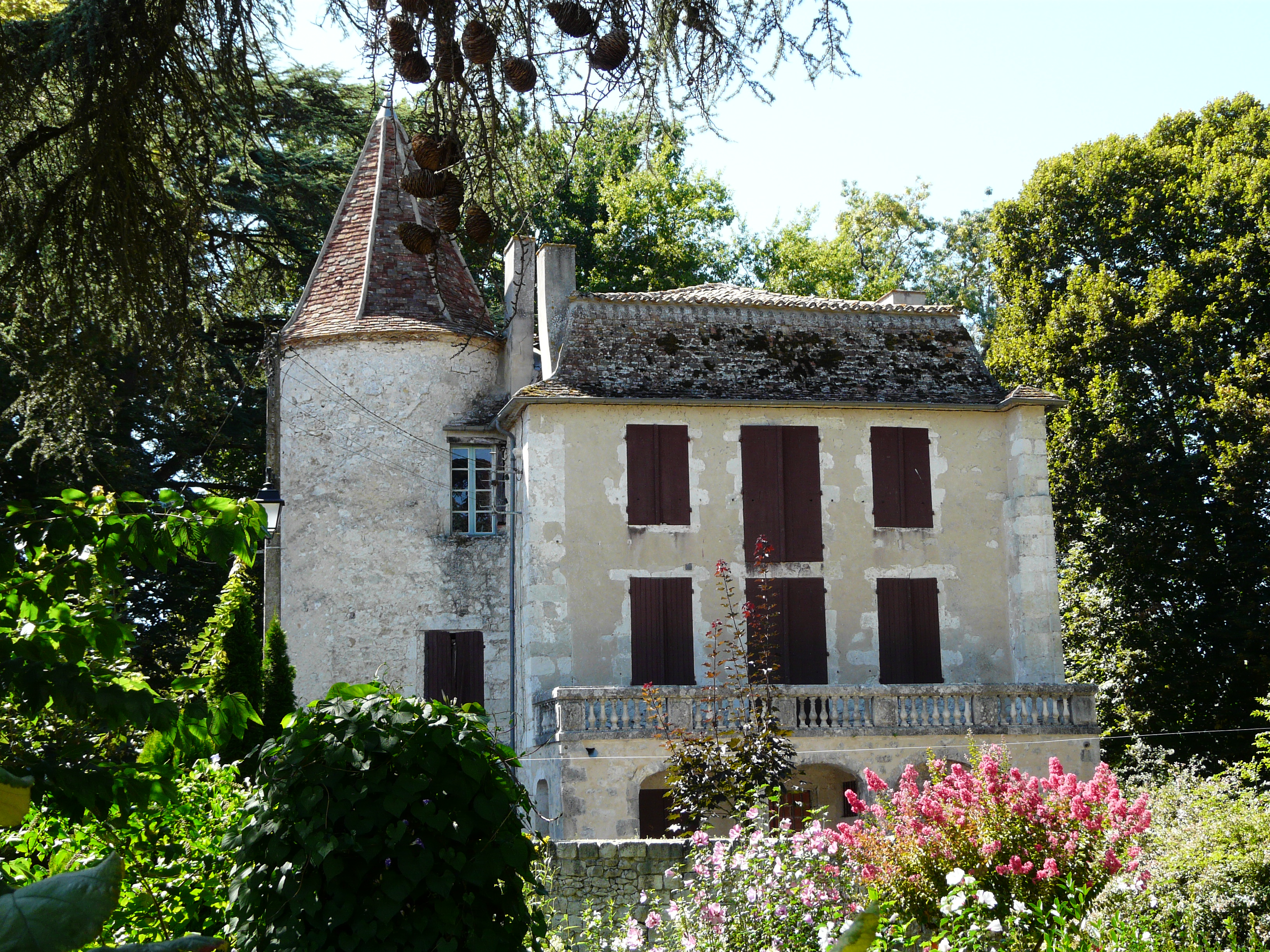
The house

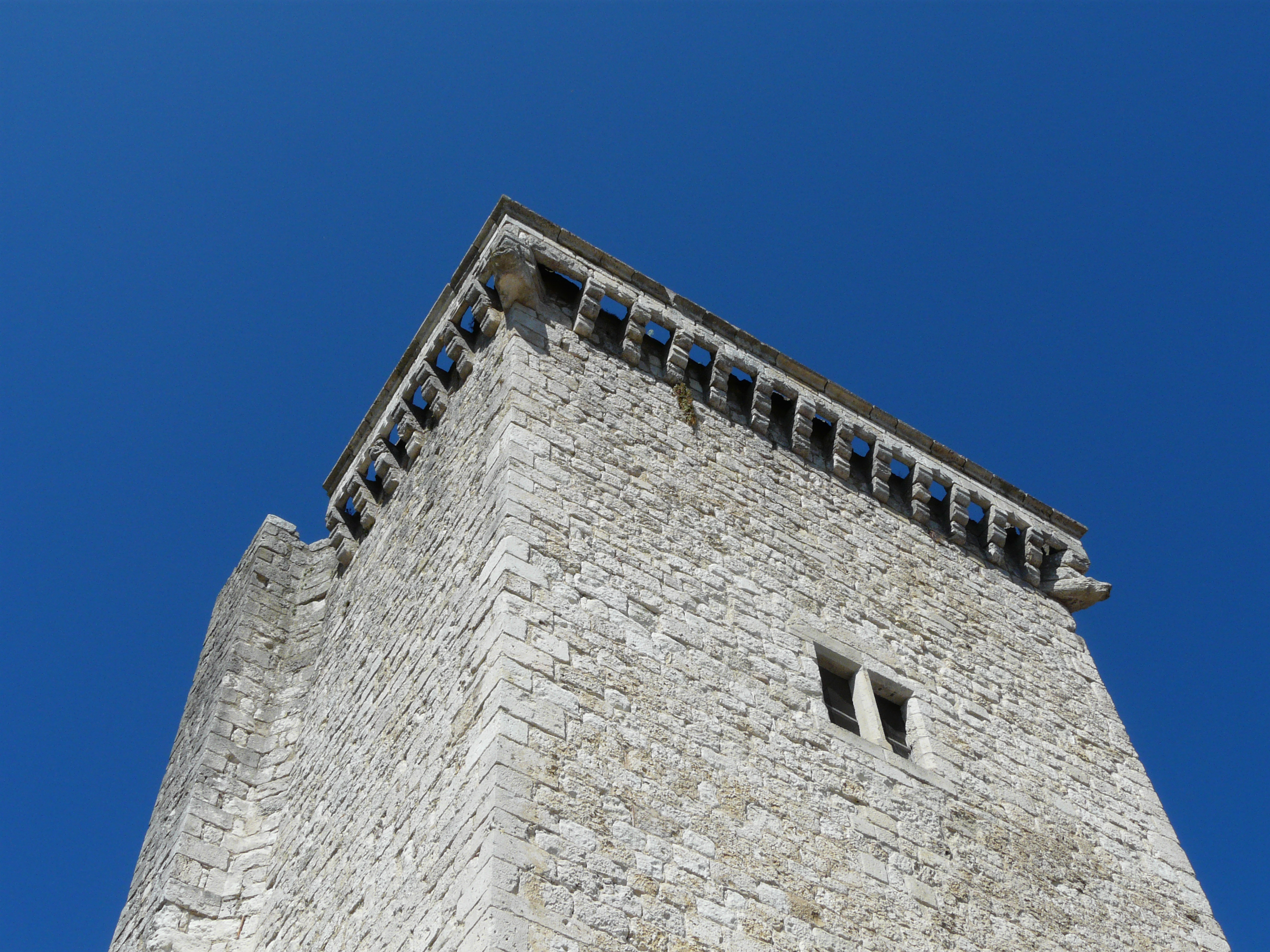
Top of the
Monseigneur Tower

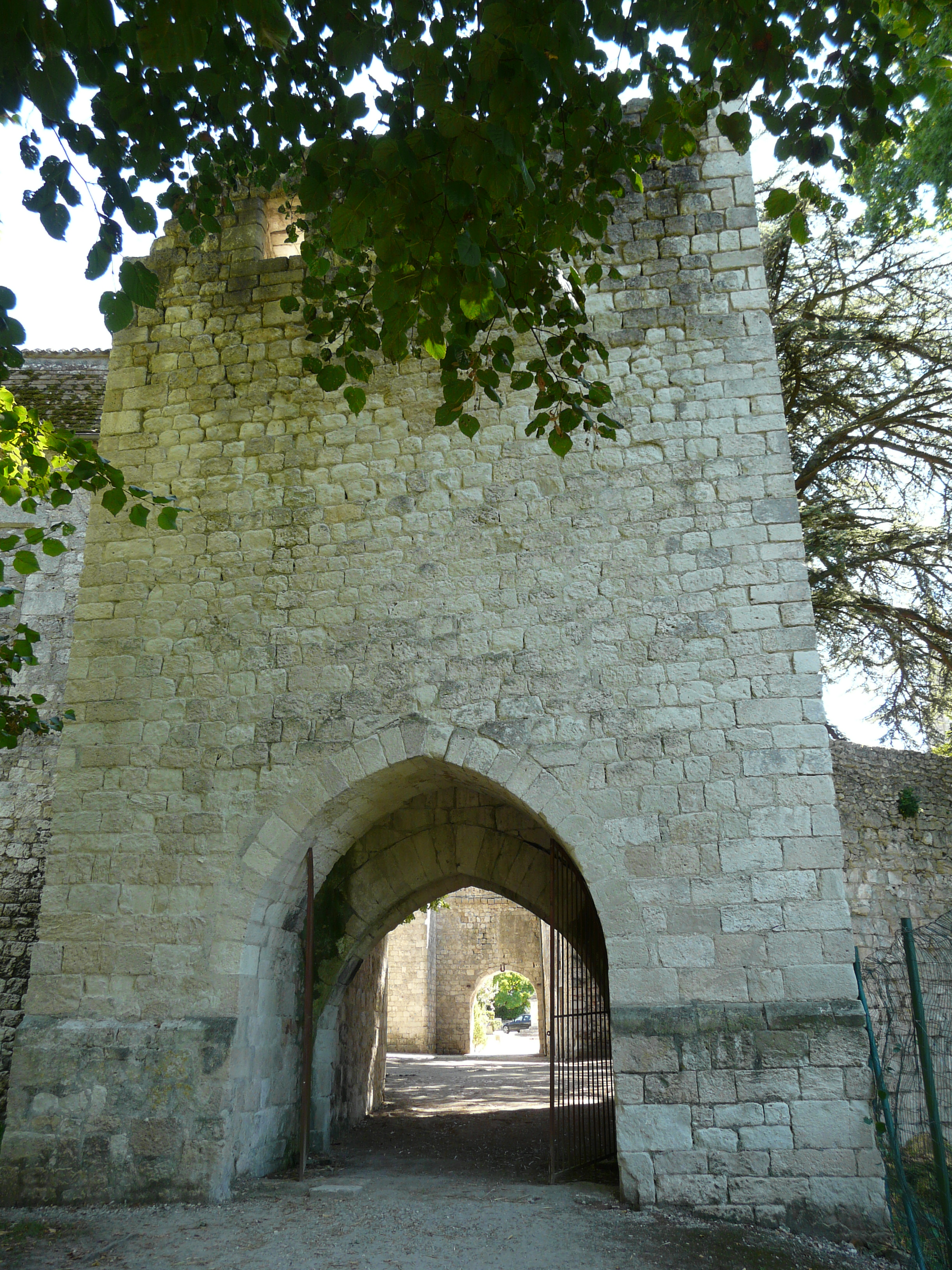
North gateway

== See also ==
- List of castles in France
