= Louis Couffignal =

French mathematician (1902–1966)

- Born: 16 March 1902; Monflanquin, Lot-et-Garonne, France
- Died: 4 July 1966 (aged 64)
- Scientific career
- Fields: Mathematics and cybernetics
- Institutions: Blaise Pascal Calculation Center
- Thesis: (1938)
- Doctoral advisor: Ernest Esclangon

Louis Pierre Couffignal (16 March 1902 – 4 July 1966) was a French mathematician and cybernetics pioneer, born in Monflanquin. He taught in schools in the southwest of Brittany, then at the naval academy and, eventually, at the Buffon School.

== Biography ==
After joining the school, Couffignal hesitated to write a thesis on Symbolic Logic but after his meetings with Philbert Maurice d'Ocagne, he decided to focus on machines and on Mechanical Logic.

He published a variety of notes at the Academy of Sciences, with a focus on using binary computation by machines to solve new problems. Following Leibniz, he promoted binary numbers as the basis of calculating machines. Couffignal received his Doctorate of Sciences in 1938 with his thesis on Mechanical Analysis, demonstrating applications for machines to calculate celestial mechanics. Couffignal took on an interest in Cybernetics, influenced by his meetings with Louis Lapicque in 1941 and the cyberneticist Norbert Wiener in 1946.

With Lapicque, Couffignal compared the functioning of the nervous system and that of machines, as Wiener prepared his book Cybernetics, the book that established the foundations for the subject.

Between 1938 and 1960, Couffignal was the director of the Blaise Pascal Calculation Center. In 1945, he was named Inspector General of Public Teaching. In 1951, Couffignal prepared an international conference on thinking machines to bring together the greatest specialists in this new science, including Norbert Wiener, W. Ross Ashby, Warren McCulloch, etc. As Inspector General, he created the first BTS teaching degree in France.

== Publications ==
Couffignal wrote several books and articles. A selection:

- Les machines à calculer. Leurs principes. Leur évolution.
- 1952, Les machines à penser. Couffignal Éditions de Minuit.
- 1956, "Essai d’une définition générale de la cybernétique", The First International Congress on Cybernetics, Namur, Belgium, June 26–29, 1956, Gauthier-Villars, Paris, 1958, pp. 46–54
- 1968, Le dossier de la cybernétique – Marabout Université 1968
- 1972, La cybernétique et ses théoriciens – Delpech J.L Ed. Casterman.
- 1978, La cybernétique, Presses Universitaires France.

== See also ==
- Cybernetics
