= Raymond VII of Toulouse =

Raymond VII
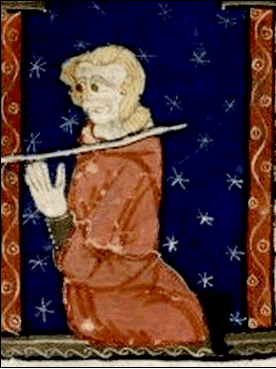

Count of Toulouse
- Reign: 1222–1249
- Predecessor: Raymond VI
- Successor: Joan
- Born: July 1197; Château de Beaucaire
- Died: 27 September 1249 (aged 52); Toulouse
- Burial: Fontevraud Abbey
- Spouse: Sancha of Aragon; Margaret of Lusignan
- Issue: Joan, Countess of Toulouse
- House: Rouergue
- Father: Raymond VI, Count of Toulouse
- Mother: Joan of England

Raymond VII (July 1197 – 27 September 1249) was Count of Toulouse, Duke of Narbonne and Marquis of Provence from 1222 until his death.

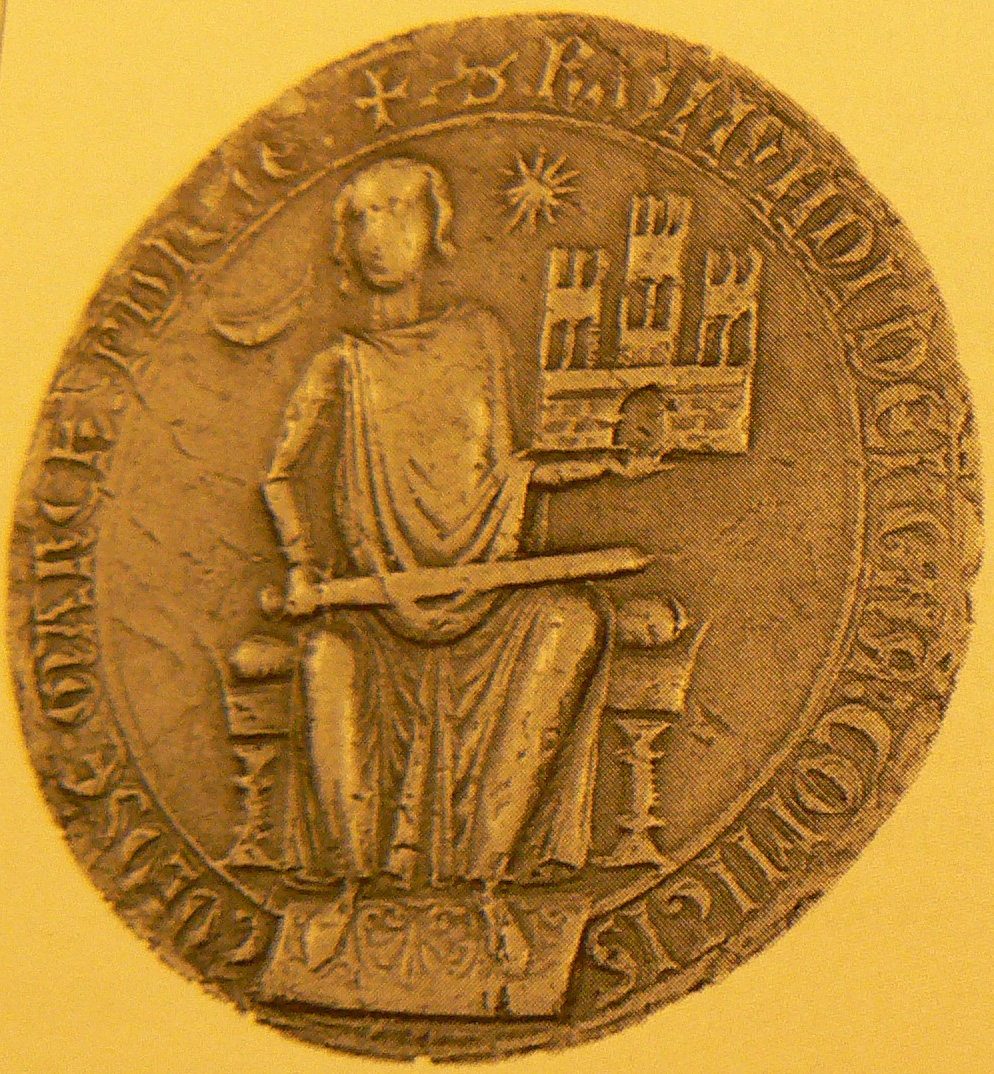
Raymond VII

== Family and marriages ==
Raymond was born at the Château de Beaucaire, the son of Raymond VI of Toulouse and Joan of England. Through his mother, he was a grandson of Henry II of England and a nephew of kings Richard I and John of England.

In March 1211, at the age of 13, Raymond VII married Sancha of Aragon. They had one daughter, Joan, and were divorced in 1241. He was engaged to Sanchia of Provence, but she married Richard of Cornwall instead. In 1243 Raymond married Margaret of Lusignan, the daughter of Hugh X of Lusignan and Isabella of Angoulême. They had no children and the Council of Lyons in 1245 granted Raymond a divorce. He then tried to get support from Blanche, mother of King Louis IX of France, to marry Beatrice of Provence, who had just become Countess of Provence, but Beatrice married Blanche's son Charles instead.

== Life ==
During the Albigensian Crusade in May 1216, Raymond set out from Marseille and besieged Beaucaire, which he captured on 24 August. He fought to reconquer the county of Toulouse from Simon de Montfort, 5th Earl of Leicester and later Simon's son Amaury VI of Montfort.

He succeeded his father in 1222. At the moment of his accession, he and the new count of Foix, Roger Bernard II the Great, besieged Carcassonne. On 14 September 1224, the Albigensian Crusaders surrendered and the war came to an end, each southern lord making peace with the church. However, in 1225, the council of Bourges excommunicated him and launched a crusade against him, the king of France, Louis VIII, called the Lion, wanting to renew the conflict in order to enforce his royal rights in Languedoc. Roger-Bernard tried to keep the peace, but the king rejected his embassy and the counts of Foix and Toulouse took up arms again. The war was largely a discontinuous series of skirmishes and, in January 1229, Raymond, defeated, was forced to sign the Treaty of Paris (also known as the "Treaty of Meaux"). By this treaty he ceded the former viscounty of Trencavel to Louis IX and his daughter Joan was forced to marry Alphonse, brother of the king.

In 1242, Raymond allied with Count Hugh of La Marche and King Henry III of England against Louis IX during the Saintonge War. Louis sent against him an army under the Constable Imbert de Beaujeu and Bishop Hugh of Clermont. He was forced to surrender the castle of Saverdun and Bram.

When Raymond died, Alphonse became count of Toulouse, and after Alphonse's death the county was annexed by France. Raymond VII was buried beside his mother Joan in Fontevrault Abbey.

== Sources ==
- Barber, Malcolm (2000). The Cathars: Dualist Heretics in Languedoc in the High Middle Ages. Routledge.
- Macé, Laurent. "Raymond VII of Toulouse: The Son of Queen Joanne, 'Young Count' and Light of the World." The World of Eleanor of Aquitaine: Literature and Society in Southern France between the Eleventh and Twelfth Centuries, edd. Marcus Bull and Catherine Léglu. Woodbridge: Boydell Press, 2005. ISBN 1-84383-114-7.
- Smith, Damian J. (2010). Crusade, Heresy and Inquisition in the Lands of the Crown of Aragon: (c. 1167–1276). Brill.
- Vincent, Nicholas (2018). "England and the Albigensian Crusade". In Weiler, Björn K.U. (ed.). England and Europe in the Reign of Henry III (1216–1272). Routledge. pp. 67–98.
- Wolff, Robert Lee; Hazard, Harry W., eds. (1975). A History of the Crusades. Vol. II. The University of Wisconsin Press.

Preceded by Raymond VI	Count of Toulouse; 1222–1249	Succeeded by Joan and Alphonse II
