= Sancha of Aragon, Countess of Toulouse =

Countess of Toulouse from 1222 to 1241

Sancha of Aragon

Countess consort of Toulouse
- Tenure: 1222–1241
- Born: 1186; Zaragoza
- Died: 1241 (aged 54–55)
- Spouse: Raymond VII, Count of Toulouse
- Issue: Joan, Countess of Toulouse
- House: Barcelona
- Father: Alfonso II of Aragon
- Mother: Sancha of Castile

Sancha of Aragon (1186, Zaragoza –1241) was the daughter of King Alfonso II of Aragon and his wife, Sancha of Castile, as well as countess of Toulouse from 1222-1241. Sancha was married to Raymond VII, Count of Toulouse in 1211. Upon the death of Raymond's father, Raymond VI, in 1222, she acquired the titles Countess consort of Toulouse and Marquise consort of Provence until their divorce in 1241.

Sancha's paternal grandparents were Ramon Berenguer IV, Count of Barcelona and Petronilla of Aragon; her maternal grandparents were Alfonso VII of León and Castile and Richeza of Poland, Queen of Castile. She was the sister of Peter II of Aragon and Alfonso II, Count of Provence. She and Raymond had one child, Joan, Countess of Toulouse, who inherited the same titles upon the death of her father from 1249 to 1271.

Sancha was a pivotal figure in the 13th century struggle between France and Aragon over Southern France, specifically Languedoc and Provence. The marriage between Sancha and Raymond VII was significant as it was the culmination of Aragon's effort to challenge the French King's authority in Southern France. Moreover, the marriage was emblematic of the increasingly disputed affiliations of Toulouse, which nominally owed fealty to the King of France, Phillip II. However, throughout the latter half of the 12^{th} Century, and the first half of the 13^{th}, Toulouse had increasingly drifted into the Aragonese sphere of influence. This process reached a high-water mark when Raymond VII ceremoniously offered suzerainty of Toulouse to Sancha's brother Peter II in exchange for Sancha's hand. Peter II was already known by this time to be extremely ambitious and interested in Aragonese expansion North of the Pyrenees. Peter II had already demonstrated this ambition through his efforts on the Iberian peninsula up until this point. Thus, Sancha's marriage effectively deepened the existing diplomatic relationship between Toulouse and Aragon and further challenged French control of the Languedoc region. This tension would ultimately climax with the Albigensian Crusade, which aside from suppressing the Cathar faith in Occitania, also represented a sort of proxy conflict through which Phillip II was able to reassert his authority in the region through his vassals.

The Albigensian Crusade was called by Pope Innocent III in 1209 against the Cathars in the Languedoc region, in which Toulouse was the preeminent power. This was the culmination of decades of efforts on the part of the Vatican to suppress this heresy in the region. Consequently, Raymond VI and Sancha's sister Eleanor, who were accused of protecting the Cathars, would find themselves as targets of this crusade. Raymond VI's likely involvement in the murder of legate saw these counter-heresy efforts escalate to the extent of a crusade. Ultimately, this conflict would see Aragon, under Sancha's brother Peter II, support Toulouse against the French Crusaders who answered Innocent III's call. It is likely that the shifting allegiance of Toulouse also influenced French participation in the crusade, as Phillip II was eager to reassert his influence in the region. The French crusaders, under Simon de Montfort would find great success initially, forcing Raymond VI and Raymond VII into exile and defeating the Aragonese-Toulousian alliance at the pivotal 1213 Battle of Muret, where Peter II would fall in combat. Although, Raymond VII would eventually return to rule Toulouse by the year 1224, his reign would one of tumult in the region. The 1229 Treaty of Paris would see the end of the large-scale religious fighting in Languedoc, but its terms were relatively harsh. Raymond VII would be forced to cede the county of Trencavel to the new French king, Louis IX, and Raymond and Sancha's daughter, Joan would be forced to marry Louis IX's brother.

Sancha herself, would have held significant power as an Aragonese royal, as well as Countess of Toulouse. Furthermore, it is likely that during the chaos of the Albigensian Crusade, while Raymond VII was occupied with the war, Sancha would have ruled in his stead. Sancha, like other contemporaneous aristocratic women, would have held a great deal of influence in domestic, religious, familial, and dynastic matters. This power was embodied by Sancha as well as other contemporary Iberian women. It is evident that Sancha, like other women of her period, knew how to influence change in the world around her through alternative means. Additionally, her position would have offered her significant clout in Western Europe, as during her lifetime, Toulouse was a seat of significant power, considered one of the dominant counties in the Southern French Languedoc province. Through Sancha, and the considerable influence she wielded during her lifetime, Southern France nearly became an Aragonese satellite. However, it would also be during her lifetime that this region's ties to France would be solidified in permanence. Regardless, it is evident that Sancha would have been an influential figure in European politics and was likely a contributing force in expanding the role of ruling women.

Later in life, Sancha would divorce Raymond VII. This was done on the grounds that as Sancha had been the god-daughter of Raymond VI, as well as his sister-in-law, she was too closely related to Raymond VII for their marriage to be legitimate. This was determined in the presence of a collection of Bishops, however, notably the Bishop of Toulouse refused to attend this meeting. This absolution of the marriage also created the possibility for Raymond VII to be betrothed to Sancha's niece, the daughter of Peter II, also named Sancha. This supports the political nature of her marriage to Raymond VII, as once the divorce was finalized the Count sought another marriage which would maintain the Aragonese-Toulosian alliance. However, it is believed that this divorce was mutually desired, as Raymond VII had been seen by Sancha as negligent. This rift in the marriage between Sancha and Raymond VII is further supported by surviving letters from Pope Gregory instructing the pair to resume living together, as the couple had seemingly taken to living separately presumably due to friction in their relationship. Resultingly, it can be observed that Sancha's agency in this divorce was also the continuation of the expansion of women's political agency in Iberia that had been ongoing up to that point. This was especially evident in domestic or religious affairs, although significant political influence was wielded as well. Additionally, during this period, royal women had become increasingly powerful in Aragonese society, as demonstrated by the prevalence of what came to be known as Lieutenant Queens. This was not limited to Aragon, however, and occurred elsewhere in Iberia, particularly in Castille. Sancha was one of several women who benefitted from this increase in women's political agency, this phenomenon was also strongly exemplified by Sancha's sister-in-law Marie of Montpellier.
