= Albigensian Crusade =

13th-century crusade against Catharism in southern France

- Part of the Crusades
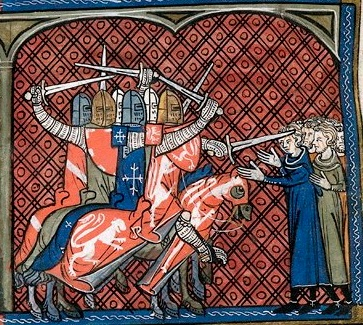
- Massacre against the Albigensians by the Crusaders
Date	July 1209 – 12 April 1229 (20 years)
Location	Languedoc, France
Result	Crusader victory, Treaty of Paris

Belligerents
Crusade: Crusader volunteers; Episcopal Inquisition; Dominican Order; Kingdom of France	Cathars: County of Toulouse; Viscounty of Béziers and Albi; Crown of Aragon; County of Foix; Viscounty of Carcassonne; Kingdom of England

Commanders and leaders
Simon de Montfort †; Arnaud Amalric; Amaury VI of Montfort; Philip II of France; Louis VIII of France; #	Raymond Roger Trencavel (POW); Raymond VI of Toulouse; Raymond VII of Toulouse; Roger-Bernard II of Foix; Peter II of Aragon †

Casualties and losses
	At least 200,000 Cathars killed
- Considered by some scholars to be an act of genocide against the Cathars, including by the coiner of the word genocide himself, Raphael Lemkin.

The Albigensian Crusade (French: Croisade des albigeois), also known as the Cathar Crusade (1209–1229), was a military and ideological campaign initiated by Pope Innocent III to eliminate Catharism in Languedoc, what is now southern France. The Crusade was prosecuted primarily by the French crown and promptly took on a political aspect. It resulted in the significant reduction of practicing Cathars and a realignment of the County of Toulouse with the French crown. The distinct regional culture of Languedoc was also diminished.

The Cathars originated from an anti-materialist reform movement within the Bogomil churches of the Balkans calling for what they saw as a return to the Christian message of perfection, poverty and preaching, combined with a rejection of the physical. The reforms were a reaction against the perceived scandalous and dissolute lifestyles of the Catholic clergy. Their theology, Gnostic in many ways, was basically dualist. Several of their practices, especially their belief in the inherent evil of the physical world, conflicted with the doctrines of the Incarnation of Christ and Catholic sacraments. This led to accusations of Gnosticism and attracted the ire of the Catholic establishment. They became known as the Albigensians because many adherents were from the city of Albi and the surrounding area in the 12th and 13th centuries.

Between 1022 and 1163, the Cathars were condemned by eight local church councils, the last of which, held at Tours, declared that all Albigenses should be put into prison and have their property confiscated. The Third Lateran Council of 1179 repeated the condemnation. Innocent III's diplomatic attempts to roll back Catharism were met with little success. After the murder of his legate Pierre de Castelnau in 1208, and suspecting that Raymond VI, Count of Toulouse, was responsible, Innocent III declared a crusade against the Cathars. He offered the lands of the Cathar heretics to any French nobleman willing to take up arms.

From 1209 to 1215, the Crusaders experienced great success, capturing Cathar lands and systematically crushing the movement. From 1215 to 1225, a series of revolts caused many of the lands to be regained by the counts of Toulouse. A renewed crusade resulted in the recapturing of the territory and effectively drove Catharism underground by 1244. The Albigensian Crusade had a role in the creation and institutionalization of both the Dominican Order and the Medieval Inquisition. The Dominicans promulgated the message of the Church and spread it by preaching the Church's teachings in towns and villages to stop the spread of heresies, while the Inquisition investigated people who were accused of teaching heresies. Because of these efforts, all discernible traces of the Cathar movement were eradicated by the middle of the 14th century. Some historians consider the Albigensian Crusade against the Cathars an act of genocide.

== Cathar beliefs and practices ==
The word "Cathar" is derived from the Greek word katharos, meaning "clean" or "pure." Partially derived from earlier forms of Gnosticism, the theology of the Cathars was dualistic, a belief in two equal and comparable transcendental principles: God, the force of good, and the demiurge, the force of evil. Cathars held that the physical world was evil and created by this demiurge, which they called Rex Mundi (Latin, "King of the World"). Rex Mundi encompassed all that was corporeal, chaotic and powerful.

The Cathar understanding of God was entirely disincarnate: they viewed God as a being or principle of pure spirit completely unsullied by the taint of matter. He was the God of love, order, and peace. Jesus was an angel with only a phantom body, and the accounts of him in the New Testament were to be understood allegorically. According to Cathar teaching, humans originally had no souls. They taught that the evil God, or Satan in another version, either gave new souls to people or used the souls of fallen angels. Alternatively, God took pity on men and gave them souls.

Some Cathars believed in the transmigration of souls, in which the soul went from one body to another. Whether they did so or not, sexual intercourse under all circumstances was a grave sin, because it either brought a new soul into the evil world or perpetuated the cycle of souls being trapped in evil bodies. Civil authority had no claim on a Cathar, since this was the rule of the physical world. Accordingly, the Cathars refused to take oaths of allegiance or volunteer for military service. Cathar doctrine opposed killing animals and consuming meat.

Cathars rejected the Catholic priesthood, labelling its members, including the pope, unworthy and corrupted. Disagreeing on the Catholic concept of the unique role of the priesthood, they taught that anyone, not just the priest, could consecrate the Eucharistic host or hear a confession. There were, however, men selected amongst the Cathars to serve as bishops and deacons. Cathars rejected the dogma of the real presence of Christ in the Eucharist and Catholic teaching on the existence of Purgatory.

Cathar meetings were fairly simple. In a typical gathering, those present would make one or more recitations of the Lord's Prayer, make a general confession of sins, ask for forgiveness, and conclude with a common meal. There were however some special rituals. Catharism developed its own unique form of "sacrament" known as the consolamentum, to replace the Catholic rite of baptism. Instead of receiving baptism through water, one received the consolamentum by the laying on of hands.

Cathars regarded water as unclean because it had been corrupted by the earth, and therefore refused to use it in their ceremonies. The act was typically received just before death, as Cathars believed that this increased one's chances for salvation by wiping away all previous sins. After receiving consolamentum, the recipient became known as perfectus. Having become "perfect," the soul, upon the death of the body, could escape the perpetual cycle of death and rebirth and achieve salvation.

Prior to becoming a perfect, believing Cathars were encouraged but not always required to follow Cathar teaching on abstaining from sex and meat, and most chose not to do so. Once an individual received the consolamentum, these rules became binding. Cathar perfects often went through a ritual fast called the endura.

After receiving the consolamentum, a believer would sometimes take no food and rely only on cold water, a practice eventually resulting in death. The procedure was typically performed only by those close to death already. Some members of the Church claimed that if a Cathar upon receiving the consolamentum showed signs of recovery, the person would be smothered to death to ensure entry into Heaven. This sometimes happened, but there is little evidence that it was common practice.

Cathar bishops were selected from among the perfect. If a person receiving the consolamentum ever committed a grievous sin, the procedure had to be reapplied. If the bishop who dispensed it committed a serious sin, all of the people to whom he had given the procedure would need to undergo it again.

== Background ==
=== Political and cultural background ===
Cathar theology found its greatest success in the Languedoc, a name eventually given to a region later incorporated into the French nation. An alternative name for the region is "Occitania." In the Languedoc, political control and land ownership was divided among many local lords and heirs. Before the crusade, there was little fighting in the area. Regions to the north were divided into separate polities, but all of them generally recognized themselves as part of the Kingdom of France. They spoke different dialects, but these could broadly be classified under the French language.

By contrast, Languedoc regions did not consider themselves French. Their language, Occitan, was not mutually intelligible with French. Instead, it was closer to Catalan. The County of Toulouse, the dominant political entity in the region, was a fief to the Angevin Empire, which controlled the Duchy of Aquitaine in the west. In many areas south and east of Toulouse, the Crown of Aragon and the Principality of Catalonia were both more influential than the French kingdom or even northern Languedoc.

By the early 13th century, the power of towns in the Languedoc was growing rapidly. The city of Toulouse was the main urban center in the region. By 1209, it had a population of 30,000–35,000 people, and enjoyed greater size, wealth, and influence than anywhere else in the Languedoc. It also enjoyed a high level of political autonomy. The Count of Toulouse resided in the Château Narbonnais inside of the city but had little real control over it. Small towns were built with defense in mind, generally with thick walls and on high mountains, often next to cliffs. Hence, a municipality was called a castrum, meaning "fortified place." Languedoc had been previously settled by the Roman Empire. Many of the towns and cities in this region were built close to, or on the older Roman settlements. The city of Carcassonne was built as a Roman fortification before having its walls reinforced.

The urbanized character of the Languedoc distinguished it from the more rural north, and more readily allowed for the mixing of different groups of people. This fostered an atmosphere of comparative religious tolerance. Jews in the Languedoc experienced little discrimination, as was the case with the religious dissidents appearing in the area in the 12th century. Muslims were not accorded the same level of tolerance, but Islamic literature and scholarship were respected.

Historian Joseph Strayer summarizes the cultural differences between the North and South as follows:

[T]he North and the South of what is now France were, in the twelfth century, two different countries, as different as France and Spain are today. The people of each country disliked and distrusted those of the other. The northerners thought the southerners were undisciplined, spoiled by luxury, a little soft, too much interested in social graces, too much influenced by contemptible people such as businessmen, lawyers, and Jews. The southerners thought the northerners were crude, arrogant, discourteous, uncultured, and aggressive. The climate was such that if war were to break out between the two countries it was sure to be long and bitter.

=== Growth of Catharism ===
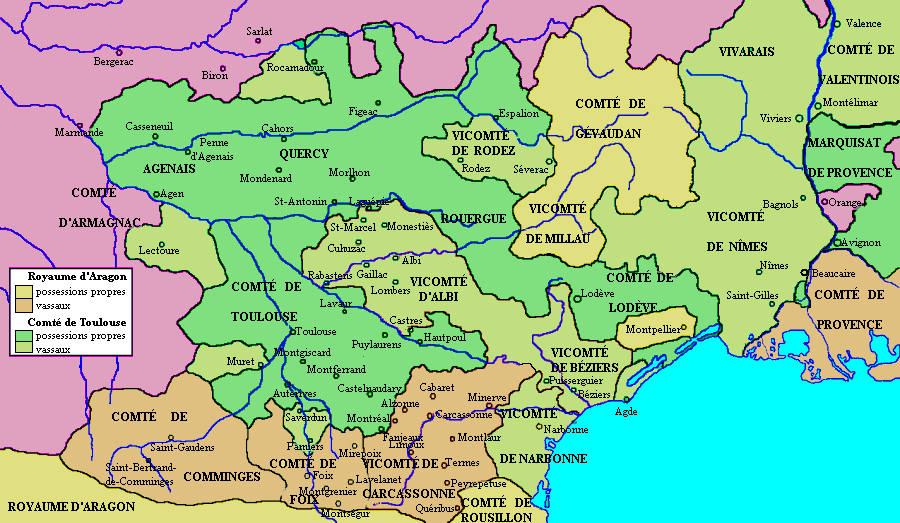
A map of Languedoc on the eve of the Albigensian Crusade

A number of prominent 12th century preachers insisted on it being the responsibility of the individual to develop a relationship with God, independent of an established clergy. Henry of Lausanne criticized the priesthood and called for lay reform of the Church. He gained a large following. Henry's preaching focused on condemning clerical corruption and clerical hierarchy, and there is no evidence that he subscribed to Cathar teachings on dualism. Arnold of Brescia, leader of the Arnoldists, was hanged in 1155 and his body burnt and thrown into the Tiber River, "for fear", one chronicler says, "lest the people might collect them and honour them as the ashes of a martyr". The Waldensians, followers of Peter Waldo, experienced burnings and massacres.

Although these dissenting groups shared some common features with the Cathars, such as anti-clericalism and rejection of the sacraments, they did not subscribe to Cathar dualist beliefs. They did not specifically invoke dualism as a tenet. The Cathars may have originated directly from the Bogomils of Bulgaria, as some scholars, including the historian Steven Runciman, have expressed belief in a continuous Manichaean tradition which encompassed both groups. That view is not universally shared. Following the First Crusade, Latin settlers established a dualist community in Constantinople in the Byzantine Empire. It is theorized that this group provided Westerners with Latin translations of Greek Bogomil texts, which included the consolamentum ritual, thus helping to generate the first organized dualist movement in Western Europe.

By the 12th century, organized groups of dissidents, such as the Waldensians and Cathars, were beginning to appear in the towns and cities of newly urbanized areas. In western Mediterranean France, one of the most urbanized regions of Europe at the time, the Cathars grew to represent a popular mass movement, and the belief was spreading to other areas. One such area was Lombardy, which by the 1170s was sustaining a community of Cathars. The Cathar movement was seen by some as a reaction against the corrupt and earthly lifestyles of the clergy. It has also been viewed as a manifestation of dissatisfaction with papal power.

The Cathar movement occasionally mingled with Waldensianism. However, it was distinct from it, for while Waldensians agreed with the Cathars in their opposition to the Catholic hierarchy and emphasis on poverty and simplicity, they generally accepted most Catholic teachings. Both movements eventually came under violent persecution, but the main energies of the Church were directed against Catharism, which was both the more radical and the more numerous of the two sects.

In Cologne in 1163, four Cathar men and a girl who had traveled to the city from Flanders were burned after refusing to repent. Burnings for heresy had been very uncommon, and in the past had sometimes taken place at the behest of noblemen for political rather than religious reasons over the objections of leading Catholic clergy. After this event however, they grew more frequent. Contact was maintained between the older dualist communities in the Byzantine Empire in the east and the new ones in Western Europe. Emissaries from the former strengthened the dualist beliefs of the latter.

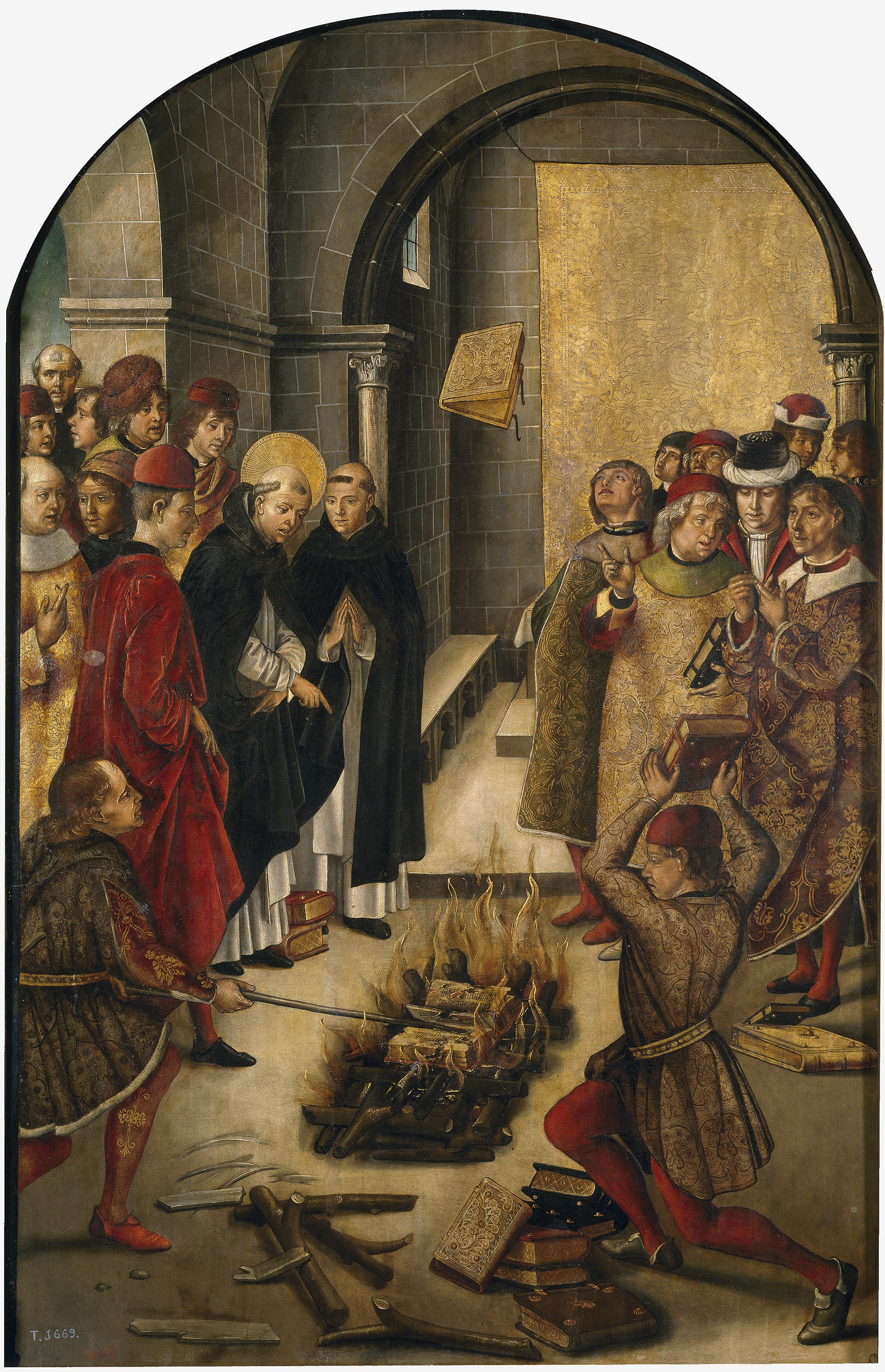
This Pedro Berruguete work of the 15th century depicts a story of Saint Dominic and the Albigensians, in which the texts of each were cast into a fire, but only Saint Dominic's proved miraculously resistant to the flames.

Catharism continued to spread, but it had its greatest success in the Languedoc. Cathars established virtually no presence in England, and communities in the kingdoms of France and Germany generally did not last long. It was in the Languedoc that they were the most durable. The Cathars were known as Albigensians because of their association with the city of Albi, and because the 1176 Church council which declared the Cathar doctrine heretical was held near Albi. The condemnation was repeated through the Third Lateran Council of 1179.

Various reasons have been proposed for the Cathar movement's success in the Languedoc relative to other places. A traditional explanation has been the reputed corruption and poor quality of the clergy, which, according to many accounts, manifested itself through love of money and sexual escapades. Many priests in the Languedoc, especially those in rural parishes, were often poorly educated and functionally illiterate. Many were appointed to their posts by laymen. The theory that the inadequacy of the clergy was the primary factor has been challenged on the grounds of similar stories about clergy appearing elsewhere in areas of Europe that did not have large numbers of religious deviants.

However, there is evidence of greater corruption among bishops in the Languedoc than in other areas in Europe. Pope Innocent III wrote a letter in which he accused the Archbishop of Narbonne of never having visited his diocese during his 10 years as bishop and of demanding money from someone as payment for consecrating him as a bishop. Innocent eventually suspended four bishops in the Languedoc—the Archbishop of Narbonne, and the bishops of Toulouse, Béziers, and Viviers—from their duties.

The poor quality of bishops in the Languedoc was due to a mix of the lack of political centralization in the region as well as the papacy placing higher importance on appointments in more politically sensitive areas. The chaotic situation in the episcopacy contributed to the inability of the Church to stamp out the heresy. Among the people, the Cathars were a minority, but they won acceptance from many Catholics in the region. Those who became Cathars were often accepted by their families. Several Cathars were chosen as members of the governing council of the city of Toulouse.

The Languedoc region participated less in popular religious movements than other areas of Europe. The First Crusade stirred up some support in the area, as Raymond IV, Count of Toulouse, was one of its principal leaders. Nevertheless, the popularity of Crusading was not as durable in the Languedoc as it was in France. Strayer speculates that a general climate of laxity prevailed in the region which allowed nonconformist religious movements to grow without being seriously challenged.

=== Prelude to crusade ===
On assuming the papacy in 1198, Pope Innocent III resolved to deal with the Cathars and sent a delegation of friars to the province of Languedoc to assess the situation. The Cathars of Languedoc were seen as not showing proper respect for the authority of the French king or the local Catholic Church, and their leaders were being protected by powerful nobles, who had a clear interest in independence from the king. At least in part for this reason, many powerful noblemen embraced Catharism despite making little attempt to follow its strict lifestyle restrictions.

In desperation, Innocent turned to Philip II of France, urging him either to force Raymond VI, Count of Toulouse, to deal with the heresy or depose him militarily. By 1204, he offered to bless those willing to go on a military campaign against the Cathars with the same indulgence given to crusaders travelling to the Holy Land. The Fourth Crusade, in its late stages at the time, had not shown any signs of going in that direction. However, Philip was engaged in conflict with King John of England, and was unwilling to get involved in a separate conflict in the Languedoc. Hence, the plan stalled.

One of the most powerful noblemen, Raymond VI, did not openly embrace Cathar beliefs, but was sympathetic to Catharism and hostile to the French king. He refused to assist the delegation. He was excommunicated in May 1207 and an interdict was placed on his lands. Innocent tried to deal with the situation diplomatically by sending a number of preachers, many of them monks of the Cistercian order, to convert the Cathars. They were under the direction of the senior papal legate, Pierre de Castelnau. The preachers managed to bring some people back into the Catholic faith, but for the most part, were renounced.

Pierre himself was extremely unpopular, and once had to flee the region for fear that he would be assassinated. On 13 January 1208, Raymond met Pierre in the hope of gaining absolution. The discussion did not go well. Raymond expelled him and threatened his safety. The following morning, Pierre was killed, allegedly by one of Raymond's knights. Innocent III claimed that Raymond ordered his execution; William of Tudela blames the murder entirely on "an evil-hearted squire hoping to win the Count's approval".

Pope Innocent declared Raymond anathematized and released all of his subjects from their oaths of obedience to him. However, Raymond soon attempted to reconcile with the Church by sending legates to Rome. They exchanged gifts, were reconciled, and the excommunication was lifted. At the Council of Avignon in 1209, Raymond was again excommunicated for not fulfilling the conditions of ecclesiastical reconciliation. After this, Innocent III called for a crusade against the Albigensians, with the view that a Europe free of heresy could better defend its borders against invading Muslims. The time period of the Crusade coincided with the Fifth and Sixth Crusades in the Holy Land.

== Military campaigns ==
=== Initial success 1209 to 1215 ===
==== Assembling of the initial army ====
By mid-1209, around 20,000 to 30,000 Crusaders gathered to march south. Many Crusaders stayed on for no more than 40 days before being replaced. A large number came from Northern France, while some had volunteered from England. There would also be volunteers from Austria. The question of who would lead the crusade was unclear. In early 1209, Philip II had learned of an anti-French alliance between King John and Holy Roman Emperor Otto IV, both of whom were overlords of different parts of the Languedoc. This motivated him to stay out of the crusade. He refused to campaign in person but promised to send a contingent of troops, ensuring that he would have a say in any political settlements that would result from the conflict. Papal legate Arnaud Amalric, Abbott of the Cistercian monastery Cîteaux Abbey, assumed command of the enterprise.

As the Crusaders assembled, Raymond attempted to reach an agreement with his nephew and vassal, Raymond Roger Trencavel, viscount of Béziers and Carcassonne, for a united defense, but Raymond Roger refused him. Raymond decided to make an accommodation with the Crusaders. He was fiercely opposed by Amalric, but at Raymond's request, Innocent appointed a new legate, Milo, whom he secretly ordered to obey Amalric. On 18 June 1209, Raymond pronounced himself repentant. He was scourged by Milo and declared restored to full Communion with the Church. The following day, he took the Cross, affirming his loyalty to the crusade and promising to aid it. With Raymond restored to unity with the Church, his lands could not be attacked. The Crusaders therefore turned their attention to the lands of Raymond Roger, aiming for the Cathar communities around Albi and Carcassonne. They marched out of Lyon on 24 June and arrived at the Catholic town of Montpellier on 20 July.

Raymond Roger was not formally a Cathar but tolerated the sect's existence. There were many Cathars in his domain; his own sister had become one of the perfect. Nevertheless, Raymond Roger attempted to negotiate with the Crusaders. He declared himself a loyal member of the Church, and disclaimed responsibility for the spread of heresy in his land on account of his youth. He was 24 at that time. The Crusaders rejected his request for peace. They marched first for Béziers, a city with a strong Cathar community. Raymond Roger initially promised to defend it, but after hearing of the coming of the Crusader army, he abandoned it and hurried back to Carcassonne to prepare his defences. At around the same time, another Crusader army commanded by the Archbishop of Bordeaux took Casseneuil and burned several accused heretics at the stake.

==== Massacre at Béziers ====
The Crusaders captured the small village of Servian and then headed for Béziers, arriving on 21 July 1209. Under the command of Arnaud Amalric, they started to besiege the city, calling on the Catholics within to come out, and demanding that the Cathars surrender. Neither group did as commanded. The city fell the following day when an abortive sortie was pursued back through the open gates. The entire population was slaughtered and the city burned to the ground. It was later alleged that Amalric, when asked how to distinguish Cathars from Catholics, responded, "Kill them all! God will know his own." Strayer doubts that Amalric actually said this, but maintains that the statement captures the "spirit" of the Crusaders, who killed nearly every man, woman, and child in the town.

Amalric and Milo wrote in a letter to the Pope, claimed that the Crusaders "put to the sword almost 20,000 people". Strayer says that this estimate is too high, but noted that in his letter "the legate expressed no regret about the massacre, not even a word of condolence for the clergy of the cathedral who were killed in front of their own altar". News of the disaster quickly spread and afterwards many settlements, with Narbonne being a prominent example, surrendered without a fight. Others were evacuated. The Crusaders encountered no opposition as they marched toward Carcassonne.

==== Fall of Carcassonne ====
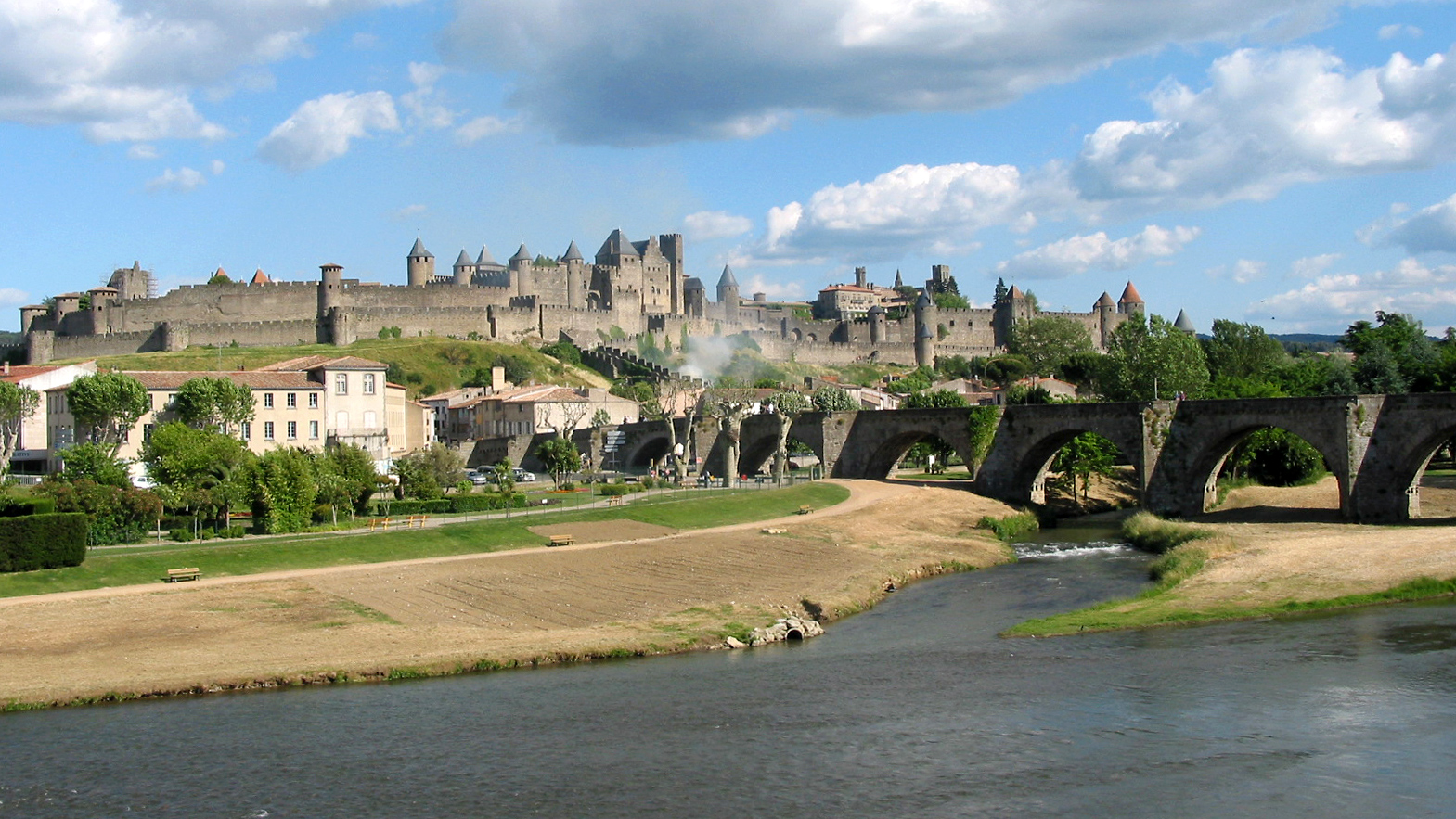
Carcassonne with the Aude river in the foreground

After the Massacre at Béziers, the next major target was Carcassonne, a city with many well-known Cathars. Carcassonne was well fortified but vulnerable, and overflowing with refugees. The Crusaders traversed the 45 miles between Béziers and Carcassonne in six days, arriving in the city on 1 August 1209. The siege did not last long. By 7 August, they had cut the city's water supply. Raymond Roger sought negotiations but was taken prisoner while under truce, and Carcassonne surrendered on 15 August.

The people were not killed but were forced to leave the town. They were naked according to Peter of Vaux-de-Cernay, a monk and eyewitness to many events of the crusade, but "in their shifts and breeches", according to Guillaume de Puylaurens, a contemporary. William of Tudela notes that the Crusaders looted the city and spread the loot among themselves. Raymond Roger died several months later. Although his death supposedly resulted from dysentery, some suspected that he was assassinated.

Simon de Montfort, a prominent French nobleman, was then appointed leader of the Crusader army, and was granted control of the area encompassing Carcassonne, Albi, and Béziers. After the fall of Carcassonne, other towns surrendered without a fight. Albi, Castelnaudary, Castres, Fanjeaux, Limoux, Lombers and Montréal all fell quickly during the autumn.

==== Lastours and the castle of Cabaret ====
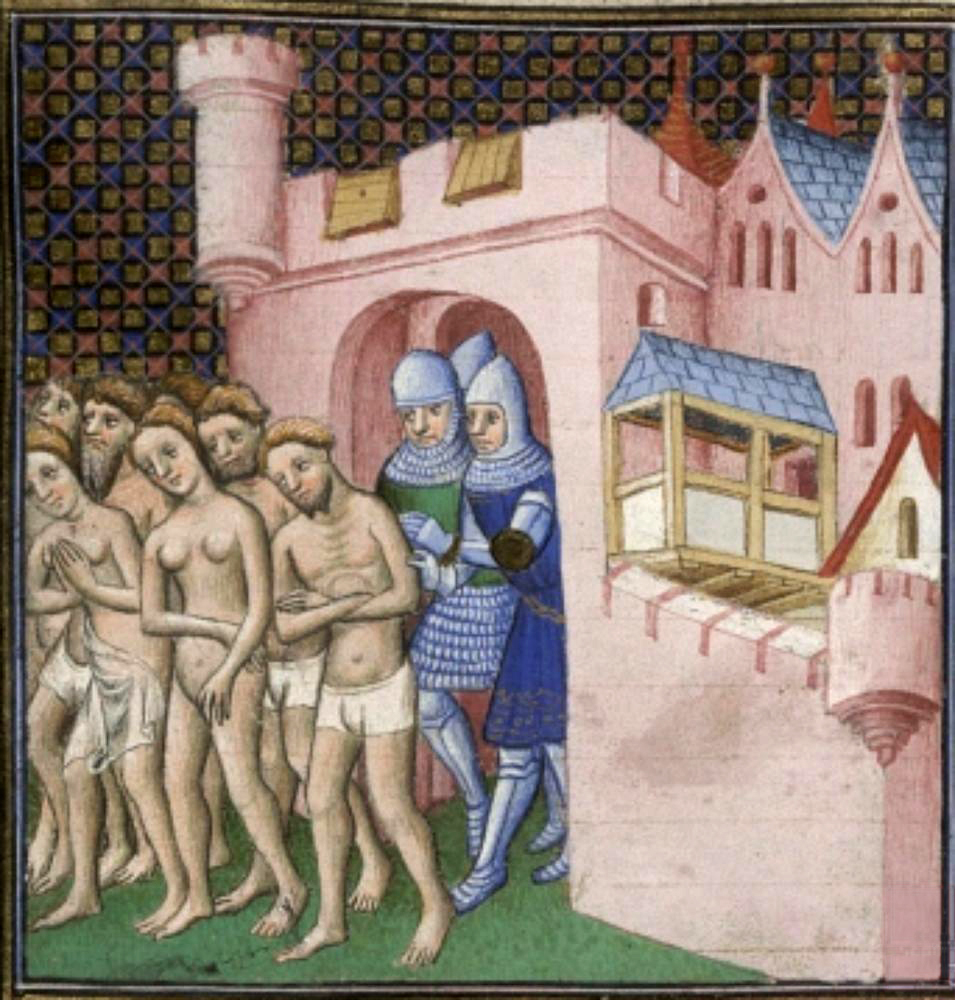
Cathars being expelled from Carcassonne in 1209

The next battle centred around Lastours and the adjacent castle of Cabaret. Attacked in December 1209, Pierre Roger de Cabaret repulsed the assault. Fighting largely halted over the winter. Due to harsh weather conditions and a small number of soldiers, Simon ceased major offensives and concentrated on holding the territory that he had already won. However, fresh Crusaders eventually arrived. In March 1210, Bram was captured after a short siege.

In June, the well-fortified city of Minerve was besieged. The city was not of major strategic importance. Simon's decision to attack it was probably influenced by the large number of perfects who had gathered there. Unable to take the town by storm because of the surrounding geography, Simon launched a heavy bombardment against the town, and in late June the main well was destroyed and on 22 July, the city, short on water, surrendered. Simon wished to treat the occupants leniently, but was pressured by Arnaud Amalric to punish the Cathars. The Crusaders allowed the soldiers defending the town as well as the Catholics inside of it to go free, along with the non-perfect Cathars. The Cathar perfects were given the opportunity to return to Catholicism.

Simon and many of his soldiers made determined efforts to convert the Cathar perfects but failed. Ultimately, only three women recanted. The 140 who refused were burned at the stake. Some entered the flames voluntarily, not awaiting their executioners. In August, the Crusade proceeded to besiege the stronghold of Termes. Despite sallies from Pierre-Roger de Cabaret, the siege was solid. The occupants of Termes suffered from a shortage of water, and Ramon (Raymond) de Termes agreed to a temporary truce. The Cathars were briefly relieved by an intense rainstorm and so Raymond refused to surrender. Ultimately, the defenders were not able to break the siege and on 22 November the Cathars managed to abandon the city and escape.

By the time operations resumed in 1211, the actions of Arnaud-Amaury and Simon de Montfort had alienated several important lords, including Raymond de Toulouse, who had been excommunicated again. The Crusaders returned in force to Lastours in March and Pierre-Roger de Cabaret soon agreed to surrender. In April, 1211, de Montfort laid siege to Lavaur. As the siege continued, fresh troops, arriving from all over Europe, were sent to Lavaur. On the way, while passing the crossroads of Auvezines, in the village of Montgey, they were ambushed by troops sent out from Toulouse and led by Raymond-Roger, Count of Foix, and his son Roger-Bernard. Many citizens, Catholic and Cathar, and the local peasantry had joined them for the battle. All but one of the six thousand crusaders were killed in the battle.

In May the castle of Aimery de Montréal was retaken; he and his senior knights were hanged, and several hundred Cathars were burned. Cassès fell easily in early June. Afterwards, Simon marched towards Montferrand, where Raymond of Toulouse had placed his brother, Baldwin, in command. After a short siege, Baldwin signed an agreement to abandon the fort in return for swearing an oath to go free and to not fight again against the Crusaders. Baldwin briefly returned to Raymond, but afterwards defected to the Crusaders and remained loyal to them thereafter. After taking Montferrand, the Crusaders headed for Toulouse. The town was besieged but the attackers were short of supplies and men; Simon de Montfort withdrew before the end of the month.

Emboldened, Raymond de Toulouse led a force to attack Montfort at Castelnaudary in September. A force of Crusaders arrived to relieve Montfort and just barely beat back a counterattack by Occitan forces under Raymond-Roger. Montfort broke free from the siege and Raymond was forced to withdraw. In early 1212, Simon worked on encircling Toulouse. He was successful through a combination of rapid military movements and his policy of quickly getting towns to surrender in exchange for not being sacked. The encirclement of Toulouse restricted Raymond's communication with his allies in Aquitaine and the Pyrenees. He faced a shortage of income and increasingly disloyal vassals.

==== Toulouse ====
To repel the Crusaders, the Cathars turned to Peter II of Aragon for assistance. Peter II had been crowned King of Aragon by Innocent III in 1204. He fought the Moors in Spain, and served in the Battle of Las Navas de Tolosa. However, his sister, Eleanor, had married Raymond VI, securing an alliance. Peter was able to use the prestige from his victories in the south against the Moors, along with the persuasion of a delegation sent to Rome, to lead Innocent III to order a halt to the crusade. Innocent trusted Peter and was hoping to bring an end to the Albigensian Crusade to launch a new crusade in the Middle East and to maintain pressure on the Moors. As the Cathars had suffered many defeats, and as those bishops he felt had been too lenient with heresy had been removed, he believed that the time had come to bring peace to the Languedoc and direct crusading military action elsewhere. On 15 January 1213, Innocent wrote to Arnaud Amaury, papal legate and newly appointed Bishop of Narbonne, as well as to Montfort. He rebuked Simon for his alleged attacks on Christians and ordered him to restore the lands that he had taken. In addition, Innocent removed most of the crusading indulgences and demanded that Simon and his legates hold a council, listen to Peter, and report their feelings to him. Peter petitioned the clergy at the Council of Lavaur to restore Raymond's lands, arguing that he was ready to repent. If this was unacceptable, the lands could be placed under the protection of his son while he went on crusade. The council rejected his recommendations, refusing to absolve Raymond and insisting that the lands Peter believed should be returned were still influenced by heresy.

Peter rejected the council's verdict. Concerned that Simon had grown too powerful, he decided to come to the aid of Toulouse. The Crown of Aragon, under Peter II, allied with the County of Toulouse and various other entities to oppose Simon. These actions alarmed Innocent, who after hearing from Simon's delegation, denounced Peter and ordered a renewal of the crusade. On 21 May, he sent Peter a letter severely castigating him for allegedly providing false information, and warning him not to oppose the Crusaders. He was threatened with excommunication. The crusade was not restored to its initial status. In April 1213, Innocent issued the papal bull Quia maior, which called for the Fifth Crusade. It limited indulgences for those participating in the Albigensian Crusade exclusively to Crusaders from the Languedoc.

Peter's coalition force engaged Simon's troops on 12 September in the Battle of Muret. The Crusaders were heavily outnumbered. Peter and Simon both organized their troops into three lines. The first of the Crusader lines was beaten back, but Simon managed to outflank the coalition cavalry. Peter II was struck down and killed. The coalition forces, hearing of his death, retreated in confusion. This allowed Simon's troops to occupy the northern part of Toulouse.

It was a serious blow to the resistance, and in 1214 the situation became worse. As the Crusaders continued their advance, Raymond and his son Raymond VII of Toulouse were forced to flee to England. King John of England was wary of the crusade due to Simon's loyalty to the French crown. He visited the Languedoc, and though direct confrontation between English troops and Crusaders was usually avoided, a contingent of King John's soldiers did help defend Marmande against the Crusaders in 1214. In 1214, Philip won a major victory against the English-German alliance at the Battle of Bouvines, helping to solidify the success of the Albigensian Crusade. In November, Simon de Montfort entered Périgord and easily captured the castles of Domme and Montfort; he also occupied Castlenaud and destroyed the fortifications of Beynac.

In 1215, Castelnaud was recaptured by Montfort, and the Crusaders entered Toulouse. The town paid an indemnity of 30,000 marks. Toulouse was gifted to Montfort. The Fourth Council of the Lateran in 1215 solidified Crusader control over the area by officially proclaiming Simon the Count of Toulouse. It proclaimed that all of the lands of Raymond VI that previously had been conquered by the crusade would be placed under the control of Simon IV de Montfort, and that the lands which had not yet been conquered would be placed under the protection of the Church until Raymond VII was old enough to govern them. The council also once again called for a new crusade in the Middle East, which dried up recruits for the Albigensian Crusade, forcing Simon to rely increasingly heavily on mercenaries.

=== Revolts and reverses 1216 to 1225 ===
Raymond VI, together with Raymond VII, returned to the region in April 1216 and soon raised a substantial force from disaffected towns. His army besieged Beaucaire in May. After three months, the occupants were running low on supplies, and reached an agreement with Raymond to surrender the castle in exchange for being allowed to leave with their arms. The efforts of Montfort to relieve the town were repulsed. Innocent III died suddenly in July 1216 and the crusade was left in temporary disarray. The command passed to the more cautious Philip II of France, who was reluctant to vigorously prosecute the crusade. At the time, he was still heavily involved in conflict with King John of England.

Montfort then had to put down an uprising in Toulouse before heading west to capture Bigorre, but he was repulsed at Lourdes in December 1216. On 12 September 1217, Raymond retook Toulouse without a fight while Montfort was occupied in the Foix region. Montfort hurried back, but his forces were insufficient to retake the town before campaigning halted. Responding to a call from Pope Honorius III to renew the crusade, Montfort resumed the siege in the spring of 1218. On 25 June or 29, while attempting to fend off a sally by the defenders, Montfort was struck and killed by a stone hurled from defensive siege equipment. Toulouse was held, and the Crusaders driven back. Popular accounts state that the city's artillery was operated by the women and girls of Toulouse. In August, reacting to the crusade's recent failures, Honorius restored full crusading indulgences to those fighting against the Cathars.

The crusade continued with renewed vigour. Philip refused to command in person, but agreed to appoint his son, the also reluctant Prince Louis, to lead an expedition. His army marched south beginning in May 1219, passing through Poitou. In June, an army under Amaury de Montfort, son of the late Simon, joined by Louis, besieged Marmande. The town fell in June 1219. Its occupants, excluding only the commander and his knights, were massacred. After capturing Marmande, Louis attempted to retake Toulouse. Following a siege of six weeks, the army abandoned the mission and went home. Honorius III called the endeavour a "miserable setback". Without Louis's troops, Amaury was unable to hold on to the lands that he had taken, and the Cathars were able to retake much of their land.

Castelnaudary was retaken by troops under Raymond VII. Amaury again besieged the town from July 1220 to March 1221, but it withstood an eight-month assault. In 1221, the success of Raymond and his son continued: Montréal and Fanjeaux were retaken and many Catholics were forced to flee. By 1222, Raymond VII had reclaimed all the lands that had been lost. That same year, Raymond VI died and was succeeded by Raymond VII. On 14 July 1223, Philip II died, and Louis VIII succeeded him as king. In 1224, Amaury de Montfort abandoned Carcassonne. Raymond VII returned from exile to reclaim the area. That same year, Amaury ceded his remaining lands to Louis VIII.

=== French royal intervention ===
In November 1225, the Council of Bourges convened to deal with the Cathar heresy. At the council, Raymond VII, like his father previously, was excommunicated. The council gathered a thousand churchmen to authorize a tax on their annual incomes, the "Albigensian tenth", to support the Crusade, though permanent reforms intended to fund the papacy in perpetuity foundered.

Louis VIII headed the new crusade. He took the cross in January 1226. His army assembled at Bourges in May. While the exact number of troops present is unknown, it was certainly the largest force ever sent against the Cathars. Louis set out with his army in June. The Crusaders captured once more the towns of Béziers, Carcassonne, Beaucaire, and Marseille, this time with no resistance. However, Avignon, nominally under the rule of the German emperor, did resist, refusing to open its gates to the French troops. Not wanting to storm the well-fortified walls of the town, Louis settled in for a siege. A frontal assault that August was fiercely beaten back. Finally, in early September, the town surrendered, agreeing to pay 6,000 marks and destroy its walls. The town was occupied on 9 September. No killing or looting took place. Louis VIII died in November and was succeeded by the child king Louis IX. But Queen-regent Blanche of Castile allowed the crusade to continue under Humbert V de Beaujeu. Labécède fell in 1227 and Vareilles in 1228. At that time, the Crusaders once again besieged Toulouse. While doing so, they systematically laid waste to the surrounding landscape: uprooting vineyards, burning fields and farms, and slaughtering livestock. Eventually, the city was retaken. Raymond did not have the manpower to intervene.

Eventually, Queen Blanche offered Raymond VII a treaty recognizing him as ruler of Toulouse in exchange for his fighting the Cathars, returning all church property, turning over his castles and destroying the defences of Toulouse. Moreover, Raymond had to marry his daughter Joan to Louis's brother Alphonse of Poitiers, with the couple and their heirs obtaining Toulouse after Raymond's death, and the inheritance reverting to the king. Raymond agreed and signed the Treaty of Paris at Meaux on 12 April 1229.

Historian Daniel Power notes that the fact that Peter of Vaux-de-Cernay's Historia Albigensis, which many historians of the crusade rely heavily upon, was published only in 1218 leaves a shortage of primary source material for events after that year. Accordingly, there is more difficulty in discerning the nature of various events during the subsequent time period.

== Inquisition ==
With the military phase of the campaign against the Cathars now primarily at an end, the Inquisition was established under Pope Gregory IX in 1234 to uproot heretical movements, including the remaining Cathars. Operating in the south at Toulouse, Albi, Carcassonne and other towns during the whole of the 13th century, and a great part of the 14th, it succeeded in crushing Catharism as a popular movement and driving its remaining adherents underground.

Punishments for Cathars varied greatly. Most frequently, they were made to wear yellow crosses atop their garments as a sign of outward penance. Others made obligatory pilgrimages, which often included fighting against Muslims. Visiting a local church naked once each month to be scourged was also a common punishment, including for returned pilgrims. Cathars who were slow to repent or who relapsed suffered imprisonment and, often, the loss of property. Others who altogether refused to repent were burned. The vast majority of those accused escaped death and were sentenced to a lighter penalty.

The type of yellow cross worn by Cathar repentants

Friars of the Dominican Order, often called after their founder, Saint Dominic, would travel to towns and villages preaching in favor of the teachings of the Church and against heresy. In some cases, they took part in prosecuting Cathars.

From 1242 to 1243, Raymond VII, in alliance with King Henry III of England, launched an unsuccessful rebellion against France. In May 1242, two Inquisitors were assassinated at Avignonet-Lauragais. From May 1243 to March 1244, the Cathar fortress of Montségur was besieged by the troops of the seneschal of Carcassonne and Pierre Amiel, the Archbishop of Narbonne. On 16 March 1244, in retaliation for the killing of the Inquisitors nearly two years earlier, a large massacre took place, in which over 200 Cathar perfects were burnt in an enormous pyre at the prat dels cremats ("field of the burned") near the foot of the castle. Included in the massacre was Bertrand Marty, the Cathar bishop of Toulouse from 1225.

After this, Catharism did not completely vanish, but was practiced by its remaining adherents in secret. The Inquisition continued to search for and attempt to prosecute Cathars. While few prominent men joined the Cathars, a small group of ordinary followers remained and were generally successful at concealing themselves. The Inquisitors sometimes used torture as a method to find Cathars, but still were able to catch only a relatively small number.

Raymond died in 1249, and when Alphonse died in 1271, the County of Toulouse was annexed by the Kingdom of France. The Inquisition received funding from the French monarchy. In the 1290s, King Philip IV, who was in conflict with Pope Boniface VIII, limited its funding and severely restricted its activities. However, after visiting southern France in 1303, he became alarmed by the anti-monarchical sentiments of the people in the region, especially in Carcassonne, and decided to remove the restrictions placed on the Inquisition.

Pope Clement V introduced new rules designed to protect the rights of the accused. The Dominican Bernard Gui, Inquisitor of Toulouse from 1308 to 1323, wrote a manual discussing the customs of non-Catholic sects and the methods to be employed by the Inquisitors in combating heresy. A large portion of the manual describes the reputed customs of the Cathars, while contrasting them with those of Catholics. Gui described methods to be used for interrogating accused Cathars. He ruled that any person found to have died without confessing his known heresy would have his or her remains exhumed and burned, while any person known to have been a heretic but not known whether to have confessed or not would have his or her body unearthed but not burned. Under Gui, a final push against Catharism began. By 1350, all known remnants of the movement had been extinguished.

== Legacy ==
=== Influence ===
According to Edward Peters, the violence of the Albigensian Crusade was not in line with the reforms and plans of Innocent, who stressed confession, reform of the clergy and laity, and pastoral teachings to oppose heresy. Peters maintains that the violence was due to the crusade being under the control of mobs, petty rulers, and local bishops who did not uphold Innocent's ideas. The uncontainable, prejudicial passion of local mobs and heresy hunters, the violence of secular courts, and the bloodshed of the Albigensian Crusade sparked a desire within the papacy to implement greater control over the prosecution of heresy. This desire led to the development of organized legal procedures for dealing with heretics.

As a result of the Albigensian Crusade, there were only a small number of French recruits for the Fifth and Sixth crusades. Strayer argues that the Albigensian Crusade increased the power of the French monarchy and made the papacy more dependent on it, eventually leading to the Avignon Papacy.

Numerous songs concerning the Albigensian Crusade survive from the troubadour poet-composers, particularly those who were also knights. For instance, the troubadour Raimon de Miraval wrote a song pleading with Peter II to recapture his castle which had been captured by Simon, while a co-written song by the troubadours Tomier and Palaizi condemns the treatment of Raymond VI and urges him to fight back. The epic poem Canso de la Crozada (lit. 'Song of the Crusade') was written in the early 13th century and narrates the Albigensian Crusade. The crusade and its immediate aftermath inaugurated the eventual decline of the troubadour tradition. Many Occitan courts had been patrons of the troubadours, and their destruction resulted in the gradual deterioration of the practice and the immigration of most troubadours from Southern France to royal courts in Italy, Spain and Hungary.

=== Genocide ===
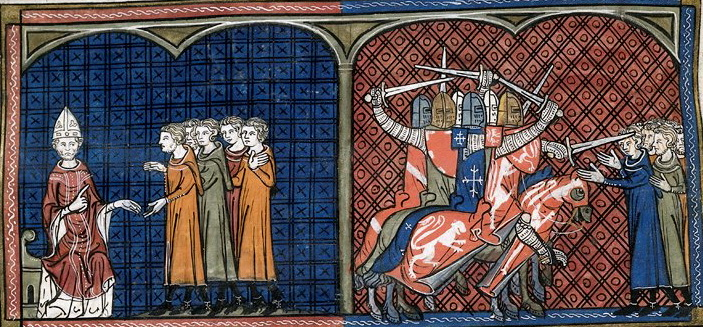
Pope Innocent III excommunicating the Albigensians (left). Massacre against the Albigensians by the Crusaders (right).

Raphael Lemkin, who coined the word "genocide" in the 20th century, referred to the Albigensian Crusade as "one of the most conclusive cases of genocide in religious history". Mark Gregory Pegg wrote, "The Albigensian Crusade ushered genocide into the West by linking divine salvation to mass murder, by making slaughter as loving an act as His sacrifice on the cross."

Robert E. Lerner argued that Pegg's classification of the Albigensian Crusade as a genocide was inappropriate on the grounds that it "was proclaimed against unbelievers ... not against a 'genus' or people; those who joined the crusade had no intention of annihilating the population of southern France ... If Pegg wishes to connect the Albigensian Crusade to modern ethnic slaughter, well—words fail me (as they do him)."

Laurence Marvin is not as dismissive as Lerner regarding Pegg's contention that the Albigensian Crusade was a genocide, but he takes issue with Pegg's argument that the Albigensian Crusade formed an important historical precedent for later genocides, including the Holocaust.

Kurt Jonassohn and Karin Solveig Björnson describe the Albigensian Crusade as "the first ideological genocide". Kurt Jonassohn and Frank Chalk (who together founded the Montreal Institute for Genocide and Human Rights Studies) include a detailed case study of the Albigensian Crusade in their genocide studies textbook The History and Sociology of Genocide: Analyses and Case Studies, authored by Strayer and Malise Ruthven.

== Bibliography ==
=== Secondary sources ===
- Aubrey, Elizabeth (1997). "The Dialectic between Occitania and France in the Thirteenth Century". Early Music History. 16: 1–53. doi:10.1017/S0261127900001686. JSTOR 853799. S2CID 193213329.
- Aubrey, Elizabeth (2000) [1996]. The Music of the Troubadours. Bloomington: Indiana University Press. ISBN 978-0-253-21389-1.
- Barber, Malcolm (2014) [2000]. The Cathars: Christian Dualists in the Middle Ages. New York: Routledge. ISBN 978-0-582-256613.
- Chalk, Frank Robert; Jonassohn, Kurt (1990). The History and Sociology of Genocide: Analyses and Case Studies. New Haven, Connecticut: Yale University Press. ISBN 978-0-300-04446-1.
- Costen, Michael D. (1997). The Cathars and the Albigensian Crusade. Manchester and New York: Manchester University Press. ISBN 0-7190-4331-X.
- Cross, Frank Leslie; Livingstone, Elizabeth A. (2005). Oxford Dictionary of the Catholic Church. Oxford, UK: Oxford University Press. ISBN 978-0-19-280290-3.
- Ellwood, R. S.; Alles, G. D. (2007). "Waldensians". The Encyclopedia of World Religions. New York: Facts on File. ISBN 978-1-4381-1038-7.
- Falk, Avner (2010). Franks and Saracens: Reality and Fantasy in the Crusades. London: Karnac Books, Ltd. ISBN 978-1-85575-733-2.
- Gaster, Moses (1911). "Bogomils" . In Chisholm, Hugh (ed.). Encyclopædia Britannica. Vol. 4 (11th ed.). Cambridge University Press. pp. 119–120.
- Graham-Leigh, Elaine (2005). The Southern French Nobility and the Albigensian Crusade. Suffolk, UK: Boydell & Brewer. ISBN 1-84383-129-5.
- Jonassohn, Kurt; Björnson, Karin Solveig (1998). Genocide and Gross Human Rights Violations: In Comparative Perspective. Piscataway, New Jersey: Transaction Publishers. ISBN 978-1-4128-2445-3.
- Kay, Richard (2002). The Council of Bourges, 1225: A Documentary History. Brookfield, VT: Ashgate Publishing Company.
- Le Roy Ladurie, Emmanuel (1978) [1975]. Bray, Barbara (ed.). Montaillou: Cathars and Catholics in a French village: 1294–1324. London: Scolar Press. ISBN 0859674037.
- Lemkin, Raphael (2012). Jacobs, Steven Leonard (ed.). Lemkin on Genocide. Lanham, Maryland: Rowman & Littlefield. ISBN 978-0-7391-4526-5.
- Lerner, Robert E. (2010). "A Most Holy War: The Albigensian Crusade and the Battle for Christendom (review)". Common Knowledge. 16 (2): 292. doi:10.1215/0961754X-2009-101.
- Lock, Peter (2006). The Routledge Companion to the Crusades. New York: Routledge. ISBN 0-415-24732-2.
- Madden, Thomas F. (2005). The New Concise History of the Crusades. Lanham, MD: Rowman & Littlefield. ISBN 978-07425-3822-1.
- Marvin, Laurence W. (2008). The Occitan War: A Military and Political History of the Albigensian Crusade, 1209–1218. Cambridge: Cambridge University Press. ISBN 978-0521123655.
- Marvin, Laurence W. (2009). "A Most Holy War: The Albigensian Crusade and the Battle for Christendom (review)". The Catholic Historical Review. 95 (4): 801–802. doi:10.1353/cat.0.0546. S2CID 159618901.
- Meyer, Paul (1879). La Chanson de la Croisade Contre les Albigeois Commencée par Guillaume de Tudèle et Continuée par un Poète Anonyme Éditée et Traduite Pour la Societe de L'Histoire de France [The Song of the Crusade Against the Albigensians Started by Guillaume de Tudèle and Continued by an Anonymous Poet Edited and Translated for the Society of French History] (in French). Tome Second.
- Moore, R. I. (2012). The War on Heresy: Faith and Power in Medieval Europe. New York: Belknap Press. ISBN 978-06740-6582-6.
- Mosheim, Johann Lorenz (1867). Murdock, James (ed.). Mosheim's Institutes of Ecclesiastical History, Ancient and Modern. London: William Tegg.
- Nicholson, Helen J. (2004). The Crusades. Westport, Connecticut: Greenwood Press. ISBN 087220619X.
- Paterson, Linda; Barbieri, Luca; Harvey, Ruth; Radaelli, Anna (2018). Singing the Crusades: French and Occitan Lyric Responses to the Crusading Movements, 1137–1336. appendix by Marjolaine Raguin. Suffolk, UK: Boydell & Brewer. doi:10.2307/j.ctt22zmbj4. ISBN 978-1-84384-482-2.
- Pegg, Mark Gregory (2008). A Most Holy War: The Albigensian Crusade and the Battle for Christendom. Oxford: Oxford University Press. ISBN 978-019988371-4.
- Peters, Edward, ed. (1980). "The Cathars". Heresy and Authority in Medieval Europe. Philadelphia: University of Pennsylvania Press. ISBN 978-08122-1103-0.
- Peters, Edward (1988). Inquisition. New York & London: Free Press Collier Macmillan. ISBN 978-00292-4980-2.
- Power, Daniel (1 October 2009). "Who Went on the Albigensian Crusade?". The English Historical Review. 128 (534): 1047–1085. doi:10.1093/ehr/cet252.
- Murray, Alexander (1998). Suicide in the Middle Ages: The Violent against Themselves. Oxford: Oxford University Press. ISBN 978-01982-0539-5.
- Oldenbourg, Zoe (1961). Massacre at Montsegur: A History of the Albigensian Crusade. New York: Pantheon Books. ISBN 1-84212-428-5.
- Robertson, John M. (1902). A Short History of Christianity. London: Watts & Co.
- Routledge, Michael (1995). "Songs". In Riley-Smith, Jonathan (ed.). The Oxford Illustrated History of The Crusades. Oxford, UK: Oxford University Press. pp. 326–364. ISBN 978-0-19-285428-5.
- Sismondi, J. C. L. Simonde de (1973) [1826]. History of the Crusades Against the Albigenses in the Thirteenth Century. New York: AMS Press.
- Steel, Matthew (2014). "Troubadours and Trouvères". Oxford Bibliographies: Medieval Studies. Oxford: Oxford University Press. doi:10.1093/OBO/9780195396584-0148. (subscription required)
- Strayer, Joseph R. (1971). The Albigensian Crusades. New York: The Dial Press. ISBN 0-472-09476-9.
- Sumption, Jonathan (1978). The Albigensian Crusade. London: Faber. ISBN 0-571-11064-9.
- Tatz, Colin Martin; Higgins, Winton (2016). The Magnitude of Genocide. ABC-CLIO. ISBN 978-1-4408-3161-4.
- Taylor, Colin (2018). Lauragais: Steeped in History, Soaked in Blood. Harborough, UK: Troubador Publishing. ISBN 978-1789015836.
- Tyerman, Christopher (2006). God's War: A New History of the Crusades. Cambridge, MA: Harvard University Press. ISBN 978-0674023871.
- Velikonja, Mitja (2003). Religious Separation and Political Intolerance in Bosnia-Herzegovina. Translated by Rangichi Nginja. College Station: Texas A&M University Press. ISBN 978-15854-4226-3.
- Wolff, Robert Lee; Hazard, Harry W., eds. (1969). "Chap. VIII: The Albigensian Crusade". The Later Crusades, 1189–1311. Vol. II (2nd ed.). University of Wisconsin Press. ISBN 978-0-299-04844-0.

=== Primary sources ===
- Gui, Bernard (2006). Shirley, Janet (ed.). The Inquisitor's Guide: A Medieval Manual on Heretics. Welwyn Garden City, UK: Raventhall Books. ISBN 1905043090.
- Guillaume de Puylaurens (2003). Sibly, W. A.; Sibly, M. D. (eds.). The Chronicle of William of Puylaurens: The Albigensian Crusade and its Aftermath. Suffolk, UK: Boydell & Brewer. ISBN 0-85115-925-7.
- Peter of les Vaux de Cernay (1998) [1212–1218]. Sibly, W. A.; Sibly, M. D. (eds.). The History of the Albigensian Crusade: Peter of les Vaux-de-Cernay's Historia Albigensis. Suffolk, UK: Boydell & Brewer. ISBN 0-85115-807-2.
- William of Tudela; Anonymous (2004) [1213]. The Song of the Cathar Wars: A History of the Albigensian Crusade. Translated by Shirley, Janet. Burlington, VT: Ashgate Publishing Company. ISBN 978-1351881715.
