= Abraham of Aragon =

Thirteenth century Jewish physician

Abraham of Aragon was a Jewish physician specializing in diseases of the eye who flourished in the middle of the thirteenth century CE. Shortly after the Council of Béziers, in 1246 had forbidden Jewish physicians to practise, Abraham was requested by Alphonse Capet, count of Poitou and Toulouse, and brother of Louis IX of France, to treat him for an infection of the eye. The count at first implored Abraham's help in vain; for he, being a man of independent spirit, held stoutly to the opinion that even the brother of a king was not exempt from the decree of a council. It was only after the seigneur of Lunel, with the assistance of his Jewish agent, had persistently pleaded with Abraham that the latter consented to cure the count.

== See also ==
- History of the Jews in France
- Maimonides
