= Alphonse of Poitiers =

13th-century French nobleman

Alphonse
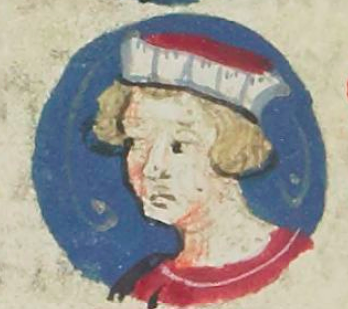

Count of Poitiers
- Reign: 1225–1271

Count of Toulouse
- Reign: 1249–1271
- Predecessor: Raymond VII
- Co-Ruler: Joan
- Born: 11 November 1220; Poissy
- Died: 21 August 1271 (aged 50); Savona
- Burial: Basilica of Saint-Denis
- Spouse: Joan, Countess of Toulouse (m. 1237)
- House: Capet
- Father: Louis VIII of France
- Mother: Blanche of Castile

Alphonse (11 November 1220 – 21 August 1271) was the Count of Poitou from 1225 and Count of Toulouse (as Alphonse III) from 1249. As count of Toulouse, he also governed the Marquisate of Provence.

== Birth and early life ==
Born at Poissy, Alphonse was a son of King Louis VIII of France and Blanche of Castile. He was a younger brother of King Louis IX of France and an older brother of Count Charles I of Anjou. In 1229, his mother, who was regent of France, forced the Treaty of Paris on Count Raymond VII of Toulouse after his rebellion. It stipulated that a brother of King Louis was to marry Joan, daughter of Raymond VII of Toulouse, and so in 1237 Alphonse married her. Since she was Raymond's only child, they became rulers of Toulouse at Raymond's death in 1249.

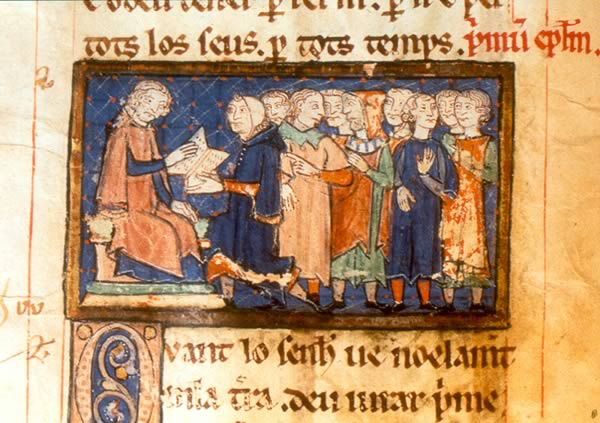
Alphonse, as Count of Toulouse, recognised the autonomy of the commune of the town of Agen. In this illustration he takes an oath before the consuls with his right hand on the town ordinances, while sitting on a pedestal. The consul administering the oath is forced to go on his knees, symbolising Alphonse's lordship and the town's loyalty.

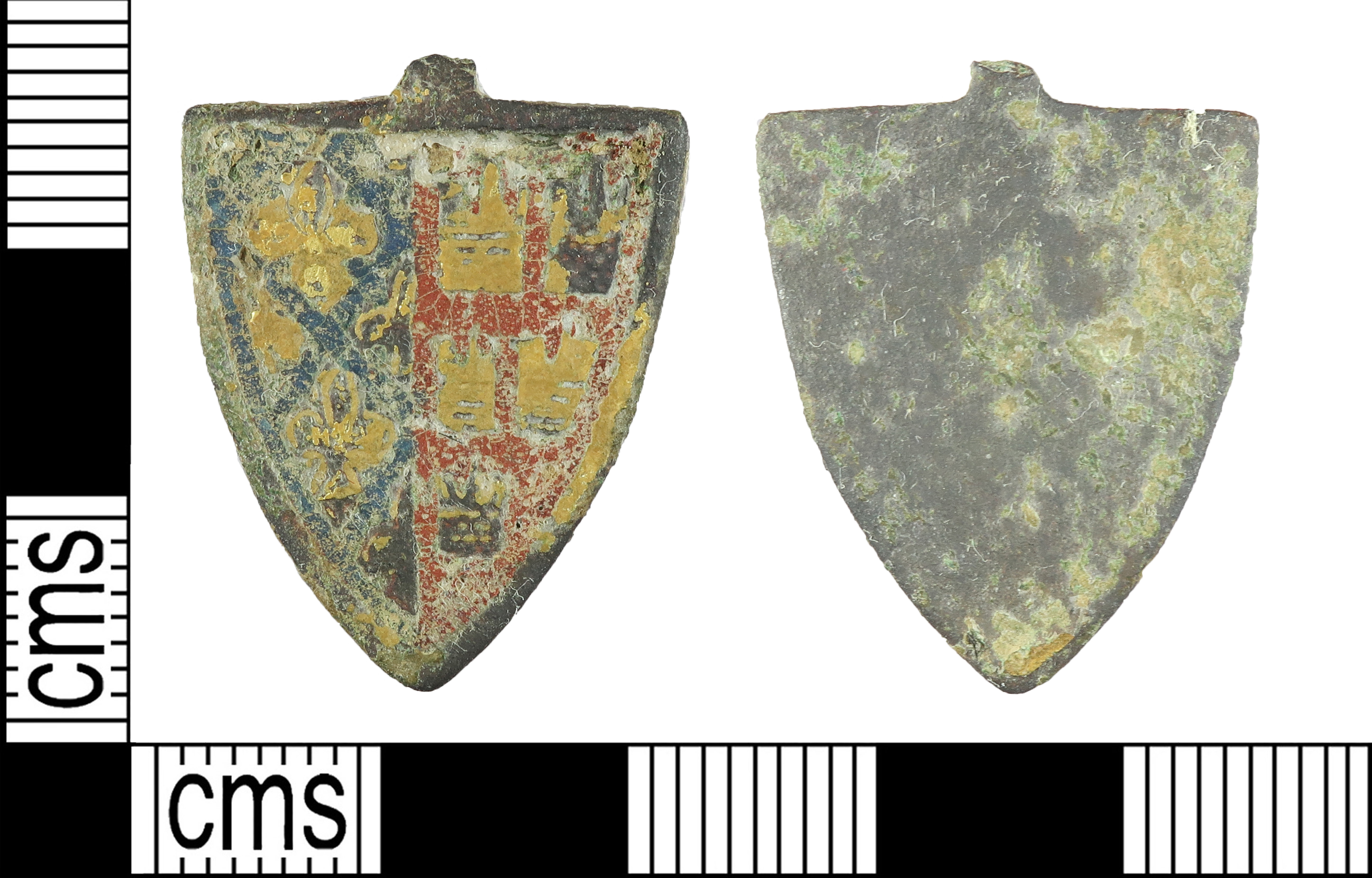
Arms of Alphonse on a 13th-century harness pendant, found in West Berkshire, England.

By the terms of his father's will Alphonse received an appanage of Poitou and Auvergne. To enforce this Louis IX won the battle of Taillebourg in the Saintonge War together with Alphonse against a revolt allied with King Henry III of England, who also participated in the battle.

== Crusades ==
Alphonse took part in two crusades with his brother, Louis IX, in 1248 (the Seventh Crusade) and in 1270 (the Eighth Crusade). For the first of these, he raised a large sum and a substantial force, arriving in Damietta on 24 October 1249, after the town had already been captured. He sailed for home on 10 August 1250. His father-in-law had died while he was away, and he went directly to Toulouse to take possession. There was some resistance to his accession as count, which was suppressed with the help of his mother Blanche of Castile who was acting as regent in the absence of Louis IX.

== Later life ==
In 1252, on the death of his mother, Blanche of Castile, Alphonse was joint regent with Charles of Anjou until the return of Louis IX. During that time he took a great part in the campaigns and negotiations which led to the Treaty of Paris in 1259, under which King Henry III of England recognized his loss of continental territory to France (including Normandy, Maine, Anjou, and Poitou) in exchange for France withdrawing its support for English rebels.

Alphonse's coat of arms was formed of those of France (left) and Castile (right), representing his father and mother respectively: Per pale azure semé-de-lis or dimidiating gules semé of castles or

Aside from the crusades, Alphonse stayed primarily in Paris, governing his estates by officials, inspectors who reviewed the officials' work, and a constant stream of messages. His main work was on his own estates. There he repaired the effects of the Albigensian war and made a first attempt at administrative centralization, thus preparing the way for union with the crown. On 8 October 1268, Alphonse had all Jews throughout his lands arrested and their property confiscated.

When Louis IX formed the Eighth Crusade, Alphonse again raised a large sum of money and accompanied his brother. This time, however, he did not return to France, dying while on his way back, at Savona in Italy, on 21 August 1271.

== Death and legacy ==
Alphonse's death without heirs raised some questions as to the succession to his lands. One possibility was that they should revert to the crown, another that they should be redistributed to his family. The latter was claimed by Charles of Anjou, but in 1283 Parlement decided that the County of Toulouse should revert to the crown, if there were no male heirs. Alphonse's wife Joan (who died four days after Alphonse) had attempted to dispose of her lands in a will to her nearest female relative Philippa de Lomagne. However, Joan was the only surviving child and heiress of Raymond VII, Count of Toulouse, Duke of Narbonne, and Marquis of Provence, so under Provençal and French law, the lands should have gone to her nearest male relative. Her will was invalidated by Parlement in 1274. One specific bequest in Alphonse's will, giving his wife's lands in the Comtat Venaissin to the Holy See, was allowed, and it became a papal territory, a status which it retained until 1791.

== See also ==
- Abraham of Aragon

Regnal titles
Vacant Title last held by John Lackland	Count of Poitiers; 1225–1271	Vacant Title next held by Philip the Tall
Preceded by Raymond VII	Count of Toulouse; 1249–1271; With: Joan	Vacant Royal domain
