= Council of Bourges =

The Council of Bourges was a Catholic council convened in November 1225 in Bourges, France; it was the second largest church assembly held in the West up to that time, exceeded in the numbers of prelates that attended only by the Fourth Lateran Council. Summoned by the cardinal-legate Romanus Bonaventura, it was attended by 112 archbishops and bishops, more than 500 abbots, many deans and archdeacons, and over 100 representatives of cathedral chapters.

== Order of business ==
The council was called during the Albigensian Crusade. That Crusade was organized to eliminate Catharism, which the Roman Catholic Church viewed as the most threateningly successful heresy Christianity had faced since Arianism in the fourth and fifth centuries. The first order of business was to adjudicate the claims to the County of Toulouse of Amaury de Montfort against the prominent Count Raymond VII. Unsurprisingly, the Catholic Amaury was judged the rightful Count and, like his father, Raymond was excommunicated.

The assembled churchmen authorized a tax on their annual incomes, the "Albigensian tenth", to support the Crusade. Permanent reforms intended to fund the papacy in perpetuity, floundered.

== Outcome and legacy ==
Through skillful maneuvering on the part of the legate the tax was passed, and a public opportunity was taken advantage of, to humiliate the University of Paris and its new Aristotelian teachings. In January 1226, Romanus granted to Louis VIII a tithe of all clerical incomes within his lands for a period of five years. But the seeds had been sown. Upon the king's death the following 8 November, the chapters of four French dioceses— Reims, Sens, Rouen and Tours— withheld future payments of the tithe on the grounds that they had not assented to it. Romanus responded that he had granted the tax on behalf of their proctors and the overwhelming majority of the council assembled. The chapters maintained that they had sent nuncios to attend, but without the power to assent to taxation on their behalf. When taken before Innocent, the papal decision went against the chapters, as the power was alleged to lie in Romanus' legatine authority. But the precedent set at Bourges had far-reaching reverberations in Italy and Spain. "By 1268 Roman formulas of the proctorial mandate were adapted for use of knights of the shire in Parliament; and soon the kings of England and France, following the precedent established by the lawyers and by cathedral chapters in provincial councils, began to express the Roman principle of due process in court, 'Quod omnes tangit' etc., as an integral part of the rationale of the representation of individual and corporate rights before the king and his court and council in assembly."

Less than successful, however, was the attempt of Pope Honorius III to secure permanent papal funding, by establishing a papal prebend in every chapter, of which the yearly income, together with a portion of the bishop's income, would be reserved for the upkeep of the papal curia. A letter extending this request to England was unanimously rejected in May 1226, at a mixed council of laity and clergy convened at Canterbury jointly by the King and the Archbishop.

Bishops also successfully defended their rights over abbeys within their jurisdiction from the papal claim that abbots were responsible directly to the pope.

The council's modern historian, Richard Kay, asserts several lasting effects of the council. Among the most prominent was the earliest expression of the political tenet that would come to be identified as "no taxation without representation", a provision that had recently been incorporated into canon law. Over a thousand of those who attended were representing chapters of cathedrals and abbeys, and Kay characterizes the effect of the council as the fountainhead of representational democracy, which, though it failed within the Church with the failure of the Conciliar movement in the fifteenth century, has succeeded in the European secular sphere from the seventeenth century onwards. The papacy was left to fund itself with stop-gap measures, which included the sale of indulgences, which would play a divisive role in the future.
