= Joan of Toulouse =

Countess of Toulouse from 1249 to 1271

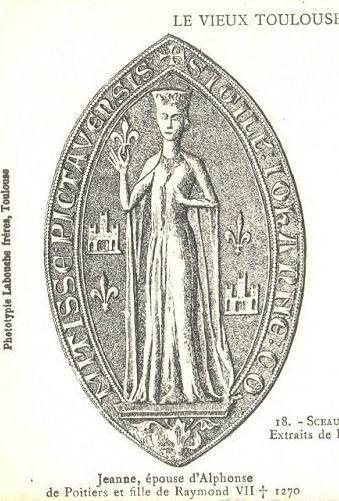

Countess of Toulouse
- Reign: 1249–1271
- Predecessor: Raymond VII
- Co-Ruler: Alphonse, Count of Poitiers
- Born: 1220; Toulouse
- Died: 25 August 1271 (aged 50–51)
- Spouse: Alphonse, Count of Poitiers (m. 1237; died 1271)
- House: Toulouse
- Father: Raymond VII, Count of Toulouse
- Mother: Sancha of Aragon

Joan (Jeanne; 1220 – 25 August 1271) was Countess of Toulouse from 1249 until her death. She was the only child of Raymond VII, Count of Toulouse by his first wife Sancha of Aragon.

In 1225, aged five, Joan was betrothed to Hugh, eldest son and heir of Hugh X of Lusignan and Isabella, Countess of Angoulême and Dowager Queen of England. However, the engagement was soon broken.

One of the conditions of the Treaty of Paris, signed on 12 April 1229, stipulated that Joan was to be married to Alphonse, Count of Poitiers and brother of King Louis IX of France, and a Papal dispensation for their 4th degree of consanguinity is dated on 26 June of that year.

After the confirmation of his betrothal, Joan was thereafter brought up at the French royal court. The date of the formal marriage is not confirmed; both 1234 and 1241 have been suggested, but the former is considered more likely. The couple had no issue.

Joan accompanied her spouse on both the Seventh Crusade in 1249 and the Eighth Crusade in 1270. In 1249, her father died, and she succeeded him as ruler of Toulouse with her spouse as co-ruler. Her mother-in-law installed a governor for them until their return to France. The couple took control over their lands in October 1250, and made their official entrance as Countess and Count of Toulouse in May 1251. After this, they confirmed the governor in his authority and left again. They seldom visited their lands.

Joan (who died four days after Alphonse) had attempted to dispose of some of her inherited lands in her will. Joan was the only surviving child and heiress of Raymond VII, Count of Toulouse, Duke of Narbonne, and Marquis of Provence, so under Provençal and French law, the lands should have gone to her nearest male relative; however, in this case the closest relative was a woman, Philippa de Lomagne (daughter of Marie d'Anduze, in turn eldest daughter of Pierre Bermond VI d'Anduze, eldest son of Constance of Toulouse, eldest half-sister of Raymond VII). In her will dated 23 June 1270, Joan declared Philippa as her universal heiress. However, her will was invalidated by the Parlement in 1274. One specific bequest in Alphonse's will, giving his wife's lands in the Comtat Venaissin to the Holy See, was allowed, and it became a Papal territory, a status that it retained until 1791.

Preceded by Raymond VII	Count of Toulouse; 1249–1271	Succeeded by royal domain
