= Treaty of Paris (1229) =

1229 treaty between France and Toulouse

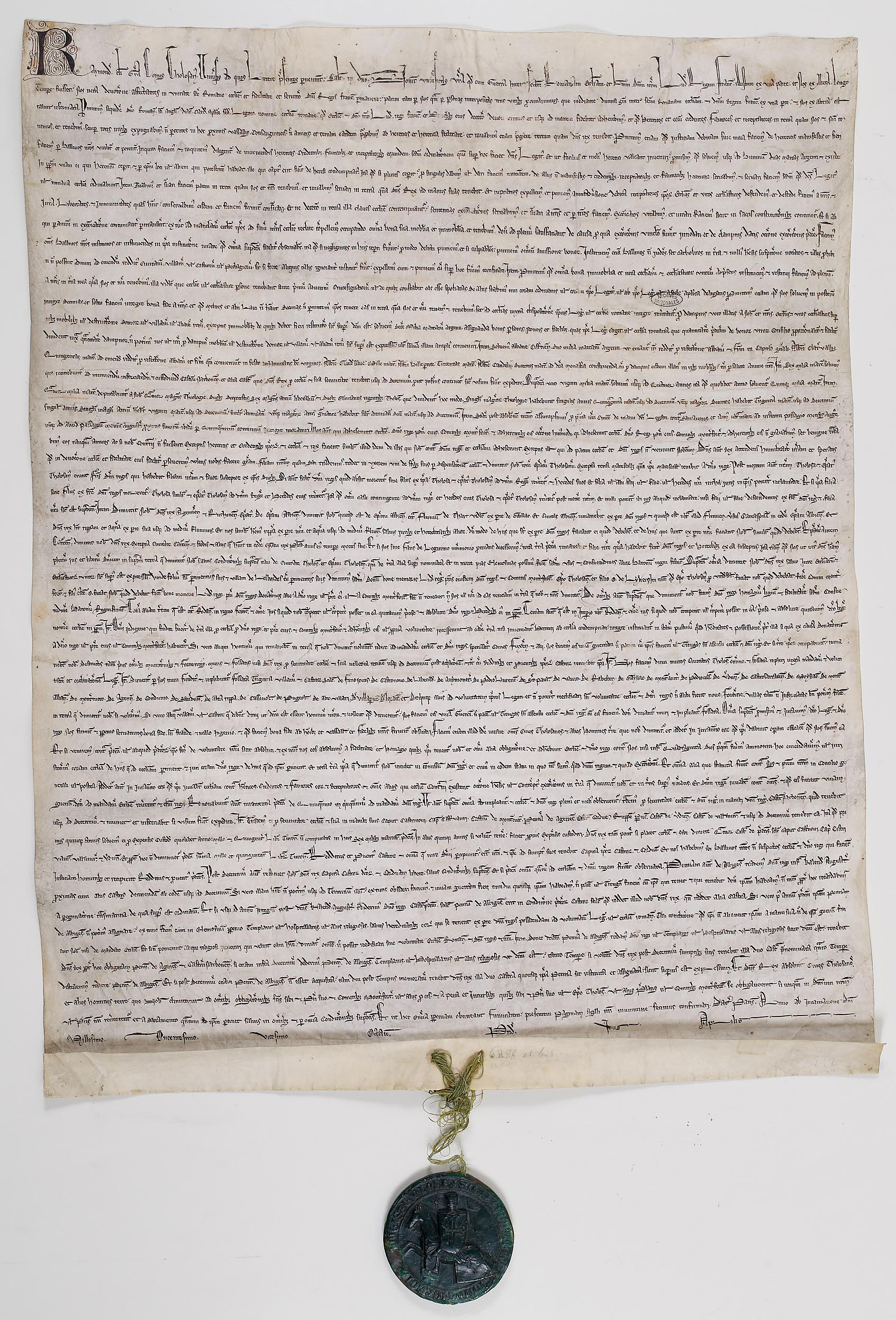
Ratification of the Treaty of Paris by Raymond VII

The Treaty of Paris, also known as Treaty of Meaux, was signed on 12 April 1229 between Raymond VII of Toulouse and Louis IX of France in Meaux near Paris. Louis was still a minor, and it was his mother Blanche of Castile, as regent, who was instrumental in forging the treaty. The agreement officially ended the Albigensian Crusade, and according to the terms of the treaty, Raymond's daughter Joan was to be married to Louis' brother Alphonse. Moreover, Raymond ceded the eastern provinces of his lands to Louis and the Marquisat de Provence to the Catholic Church. The treaty also gave the Inquisition absolute power regarding searching for, and seizing of heretics by the Catholic Church.

Raymond ceded more than half his land to the French crown and retained the remainder only during his life, and it would then be inherited by his son-in-law Alphonse, Louis's brother or, if Alphonse had no heir, by the French crown. The Papacy gained the Comtat Venaissin.

Raymond regained his feudal rights but had to swear allegiance to Louis IX. Fortifications, such as those of Toulouse, were dismantled. The Cathars were left without political and military protection, as Raymond and his subordinates, now vassals of the French crown, were ordered to hunt them down.

== See also ==
- List of treaties

== Sources ==
- Ekelund, Robert B.; Tollison, Robert D.; Anderson, Gary M. (1996). "Attempts to Maintain Market Dominance". Sacred Trust: The Medieval Church as an Economic Firm. Oxford University Press. pp. 60–79.
- Jackson, Guida M. (1999). Women Rulers throughout the Ages: An Illustrated guide. ABC-CLIO.
- Jordan, William Chester (1999). "The Capetians from the death of Philip II to Philip IV". In Abulafia, David (ed.). The New Cambridge Medieval History. Vol. 5, c.1198 – c.1300. Cambridge University Press. pp. 279–313.
- Sumption, Jonathan (1999). The Albigensian Crusade. Faber and Faber.
