= Sancho VII of Navarre =

King of Navarre from 1194 to 1234

Sancho VII
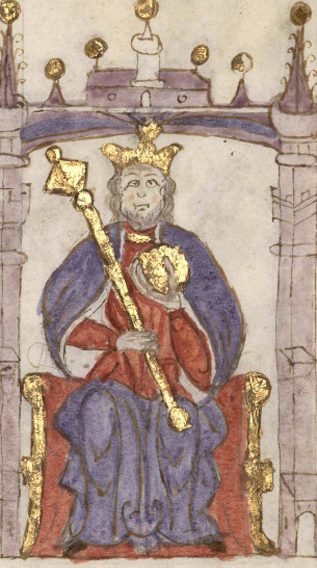
- Sancho VII depicted in the Semblanzas de reyes

King of Navarre
- Reign: 1194–1234
- Predecessor: Sancho VI
- Successor: Theobald I
- Born: c. 1157
- Died: 7 April 1234 (aged 76–77); Tudela, Kingdom of Navarre
- Spouse: Constance of Toulouse
- House: House of Jiménez
- Father: Sancho VI of Navarre
- Mother: Sancha of Castile

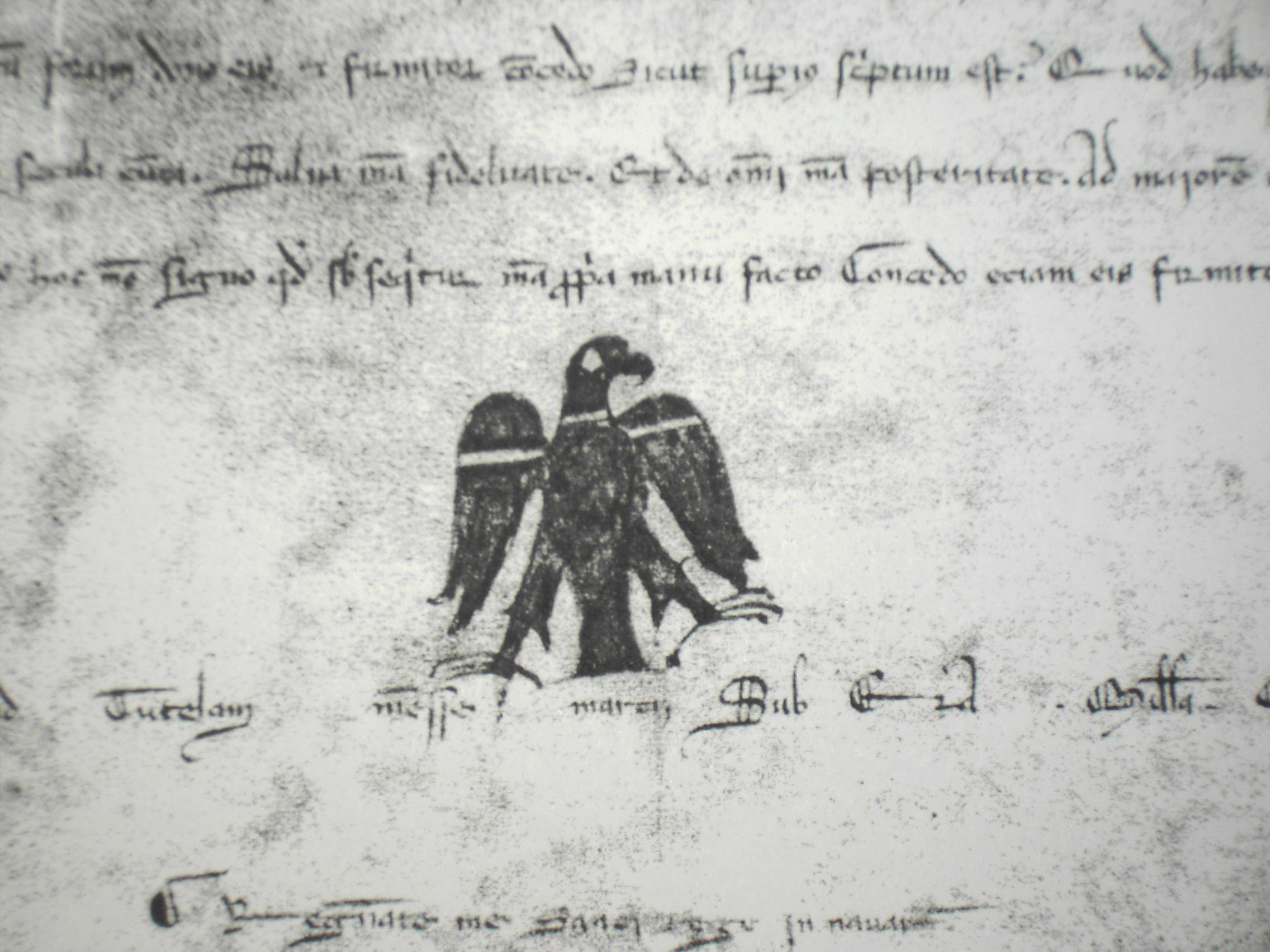
Sigil of Sancho VII the Strong

Sancho VII (Basque: Antso VII.a; c. 1157 – 7 April 1234), called the Strong (Basque: Azkarra, Spanish: el Fuerte), was King of Navarre from 1194 until his death in 1234. He was the son and heir of Sancho VI, whom he followed as the second king to hold the title of King of Navarre. Sancho VII was the first to use the chains of Navarre as his blazon, a symbol that later would become the main one of Navarre, and the last member of the Jiménez dynasty, which had ruled since the 9th century.

== Youth ==
Sancho was probably the eldest child of Sancho VI and Sancha, daughter of Alfonso VII of León, born soon after their marriage, probably in Tudela, their usual residence.

Sancho's younger sister Berengaria was married to Richard I of England in 1191 on the island of Cyprus on the way to the Holy Land for the Third Crusade. Sancho and Richard were reputed to have been good friends and close allies, even before the marriage brought them together. The French took advantage of Richard's captivity in Germany and captured certain key fortresses of the Plantagenet dominions including Loches. When Richard returned to his continental lands in 1194, the knights of Sancho were besieging the castle for him. As soon as Richard arrived though, Sancho was forced to return to Navarre at the news of the death of his father. He was crowned in Pamplona on 15 August.

== Reign ==
Kingdom of Navarre during the rule of Sancho VII: Kingdom of Navarre Territory lost to Castile (1198–1200) Vassal territories (1196–1203) Kingdom of Castile Kingdom of Aragon

Sancho arrived late at the Battle of Alarcos in 1195 and thus ruined good relations with Alfonso VIII of Castile. The ensuing confrontation resulted in Sancho devastating Soria and Almazán and Alfonso accepted the Peace of Tarazona.

Sancho made expeditions against Murcia and Andalusia, and, between 1198 and 1200, he campaigned in Africa, probably in the service of the Almohads, whose help he wanted against Castile. Taking advantage of his absence, Alfonso VIII of Castile and Peter II of Aragon invaded Navarre, which lost the provinces of Álava, Guipúzcoa, and Biscay to Castile. These conquests were subsequently confirmed by the Treaty of Guadalajara (1207).

Sancho's leadership was decisive in the Battle of Las Navas de Tolosa in the year 1212. In that engagement, the Christian forces of Sancho, Alfonso, Afonso II of Portugal, and Peter II of Aragón allied to defeat the forces of Almohad Caliph Muhammad al-Nasir. Sancho led a charge which broke through the bodyguard around the tent of the Caliph, who was slain. Supposedly the guards were slaves chained together to prevent any retreat or flight. In commemoration of this deed, the coat of arms of Navarre bears an array of linked chains.

In 1219–1220, Sancho took part in a crusade, probably the crusade against Requena.

Sancho's relations with the countries north of the Pyrenees were notably better than his Castilian ones. Several Pyrenean counties declared themselves his vassals and he concluded treaties with John, King of England, and with Peter II and James I of Aragon. He signed a treaty with James in 1231, under which whoever survived the other would inherit the other's kingdom, but this treaty was never implemented.

Sancho continued the construction of a new cathedral in Pamplona, which had been begun by his father and was finished by his successor. The construction of a certain Gothic bridge over the Ebro in Tudela has also been attributed to him.

== Succession ==
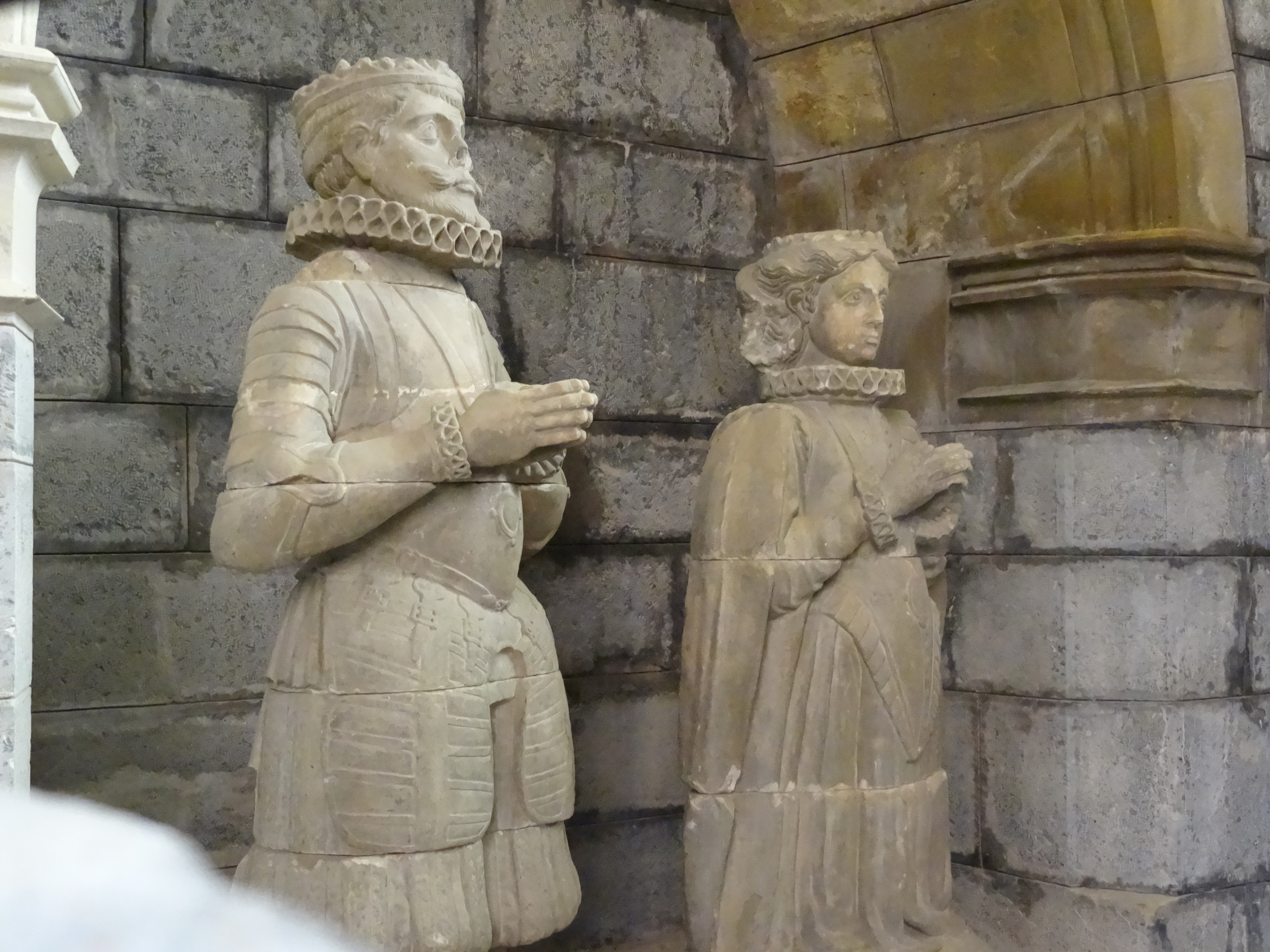
Statues of Sancho and his wife (Capilla de San Agustín, Roncesvalles)

Sancho VII was married twice. His first wife was Constance, daughter of Raymond VI of Toulouse and Beatrice of Béziers, whom he married in 1195. He repudiated her a few years later. The identity of his second wife is disputed; some sources mention her as Clemence, daughter of Frederick I, Holy Roman Emperor, while other sources claim she was the daughter of Yusuf II, an emir from Morocco. Sancho VII had no known children by either wife. According to Charles of Viana, however, he had a son with his second wife, who died in an accident when he was 15 years old.

As the result of prolonged and painful illness, starting with a varicose ulcer on his right leg and ashamed of it and his consequent obesity, Sancho went into retirement at Tudela at some point, when his youngest sister Blanche came from Champagne and took administration of the kingdom until she died in 1229. His eldest sister, Berengaria, Queen of England, died in 1230, thus leaving Sancho alone among the children of Sancho VI. When he died in his castle at Tudela, probably of complications related to the varicose ulcer in his leg, his only nephew and Blanche's son Theobald IV of Champagne was recognized as his successor.

== Legacy ==
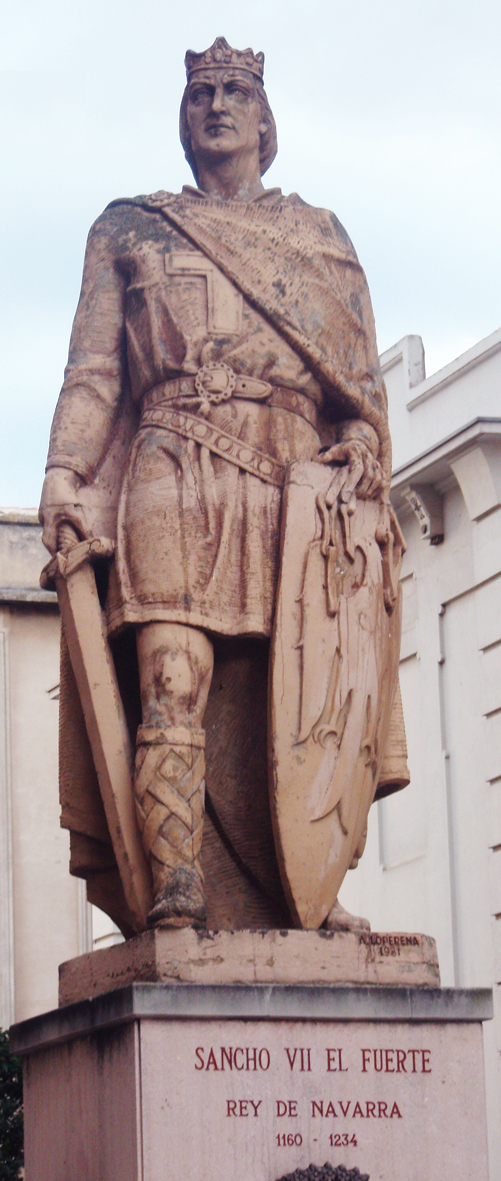
Statue in Tudela

According to Alberic de Trois-Fontaines, Sancho left a large library, although the number of 1.7 million books is likely exaggerated. The cultural contacts with the Muslim Kingdoms that he visited and battled with, his friendship with his brother-in-law King Richard, and his sister Blanche's court of Troyes, at the time the most refined in Europe, must have left an important influence on the King's personal intellect, bringing to him an advantageous outlook from the one well set already by their father at his youth, full however with peccadilloes and other impetuous extravaganza.

Sancho left the kingdom with a wealthy treasury, and improved communications. He was originally interred in the Church of San Nicolás, but was later moved to Roncesvalles after much resistance from the local Clergy. His remains have since been exhumed for study and examined by the physician Luis del Campo, also the king's biographer, who measured him at 2.20 metres tall (7'3"), probably the basis for his "strength" epitaph.

== Notes ==
Sancho VII of Navarre House of Jiménez Born: 17 Apr 1154 Died: 7 Apr 1234
Regnal titles
Preceded by Sancho VI	King of Navarre; 1194–1234	Succeeded by Theobald I
