= Eleanor of Aragon, Countess of Toulouse =

Countess consort of Toulouse from 1204 to 1226

Eleanor of Aragon

Countess consort of Toulouse
- Tenure: 1204–1226
- Born: 1182
- Died: 1226 (aged 43–44)
- Spouse: Raymond VI, Count of Toulouse
- House: Barcelona
- Father: Alfonso II of Aragon
- Mother: Sancha of Castile

Eleanor of Aragon, Countess of Toulouse (1182–1226) was a daughter of King Alfonso II of Aragon and Sancha of Castile. She married Raymond VI, Count of Toulouse.

== Life ==
According to the Ex Gestis Comitum Barcinonensium, she was the second daughter and fourth of nine children of the troubadour king, Alfonso II of Aragon and his wife Sancha of Castile. She had for older brothers Pierre II the Catholic and Alphonse II, Count of Provence and Forcalquier, and for sisters Constance, first queen of Hungary, then empress by her marriage with Frederick II, and Sancie, countess of Toulouse.

According to the Crónica of San Juan de la Peña, her brother Peter II sealed the union of Eleanor, with Raymond VI of Toulouse, Duke of Narbonne and Marquis of Provence, in order to put an end to the dissensions with the counts of Toulouse.

Raymond VI was the eldest son of Raymond V and Constance of France, daughter of King Louis VI and Adelaide de Maurienne. Eleanor was Raymond VI's 6th wife, having divorced an unknown daughter and sole heiress of Emperor Isaac Komnenos of Cyprus just two years earlier. Raymond and Eleanor did not have children.

By this marriage she became countess of Toulouse which would suffer the pangs of the war and the Albigensian Crusade, in the following years. The crusade was initiated by Pope Innocent III and headed by the French Crown against Toulouse and Catharism.
