= Villanueva de Sigena =

- Municipality
- Villanueva de Sigena
- Coat of arms

- Location in Spain
- Coordinates: 41°42′55.3″N 0°0′31.6″W
- Country: Spain
- Autonomous community: Aragon
- Province: Huesca
- Comarca: Monegros

Government
  - Mayor: Ildefonso Salillas Lacasa

Area
  - Total: 146.37 km^{2} (56.51 sq mi)
- Elevation: 230 m (750 ft)

Population (2025-01-01)
  - Total: 340
  - Density: 2.3/km^{2} (6.0/sq mi)
- Time zone: UTC+1 (CET)
  - Summer (DST): UTC+2 (CEST)
- Postal code: 22231

Villanueva de Sigena or Villanueva de Sijena is a town in the county of Los Monegros, in the northern province of Huesca, in Aragon (Spain). Located near the Alcanadre river, the local economy is primarily agricultural-based.

The Royal Monastery of Santa María de Sigena is located on the outskirts of town. Mount Sigena is a hill of the Sierra de Alcubierre located 5 km to the south.

Villanueva de Sigena is the birthplace of the physician and heterodox theologian, Michael Servetus (1511?–1553). Servetus was the discoverer of pulmonary circulation. A museum and interpretation center, maintained by the Michael Servetus Institute, is now located in the original house were Servetus was born.

Nearby there is the original settlement, based round the partially ruined, and once wealthy and aristocratic Romanesque convent of Santa María la Real de Sijena, founded in 1183 by Sancha of Castile, Queen of Aragon. This was largely destroyed by fire in 1936 by anti-clerical Republicans in the Spanish Civil War. It is now in the process of restoration, and has been reoccupied by nuns since 1985. Several royal burials were made in the convent church, including Sancha, who died there, her son Pedro II of Aragon and two of his sisters.

The chapter house housed extremely important Romanesque frescos of about 1200 by largely English artists, probably including some of those who produced the Winchester Bible; this was only realized after their destruction. The artists also appear to have visited Palermo before Sigena, as some influence from mosaics there can be seen. The frescos had been fully photographed in black and white shortly before their destruction, and the remaining damaged sections, mostly having lost their colour, are in the Museu Nacional d'Art de Catalunya in Barcelona.

== See also ==
- Monegros
- Monastery of Santa María de Sigena
- List of municipalities in Zaragoza
- List of municipalities in Huesca
