= Constance of Toulouse =

Queen of Navarre from 1195 to 1200

- coat-of-arms of Toulouse (Languedoc).

Queen consort of Navarre
- Tenure: 1195–1200
- Born: c. 1180
- Died: aft. 12 May 1260
- Spouse: Sancho VII of Navarre; Peter Bermond II of Sauve
- House: House of Toulouse
- Father: Raymond VI, Count of Toulouse
- Mother: Beatrice of Béziers

Constance of Toulouse was the daughter of Raymond VI, Count of Toulouse and his second wife Beatrice of Béziers.

She first married Sancho VII of Navarre in 1195, but they were divorced in 1200. After the annulment she remarried to Peter Bermond II of Sauve.

With her second husband, Constance had the following children:

1. Peter Bermond, succeeded his father and had issue
2. Raymond, ancestor of the Barons de Florac
3. Bermond, ancestor of the Barons de Caylar
4. daughter (name unknown), married Hugh de Mirabel
5. daughter (name unknown), betrothed to Arnaud de Roquefeuil
6. Sibylle, married Barral of Baux

== Sources ==
- William of Puylaurens (2003). The Chronicle of William of Puylaurens: The Albigensian Crusade and Its Aftermath. Translated by Sibley, W.A.; Sibley, M.D. The Boydell Press.

Preceded by Sancha of Castile	Queen of Navarre; 1195–1200	Succeeded by Margaret of Bourbon
