= Damsel of Cyprus =

Daughter of the emperor of Cyprus (born c. 1177)

The Damsel of Cyprus (born c. 1177), possibly named Beatrice or Maria, was the daughter of Isaac Komnenos, emperor of Cyprus, and an Armenian princess. She was her father's sole heiress. Her given name is not known with certainty and she is known by convention as the "Damsel of Cyprus".

She was a hostage in the Principality of Antioch from 1182 until at least 1184. She was captured in 1191 during a brief war between her father and King Richard I of England. She remained an English prisoner, although treated well, until 1194. During her captivity she travelled throughout the Holy Land, Italy and France. After her release, she remained in France. In 1199 or 1200, she married Count Raymond VI of Toulouse, becoming his fifth wife. They divorced by late 1202 or early 1203, when she married Thierry of Flanders, who attempted to claim Cyprus on her behalf. After this failed venture, the couple went to Cilician Armenia. Her fate thereafter is unknown.

== Name ==
The Damsel of Cyprus referred to in contemporary chronicles and documents as "Isaac's daughter" (filia Isaaci) or the "daughter of the emperor [of Cyprus]" (filia imperatoris [Cypri], fille de l'Empereor de Chypre). The chronicles that record her second marriage do not name her husband either, although his identity can be deduced from the information given.

Wipertus Rudt de Collenberg suggests that Isaac's daughter may be the domicella (damsel) Beatrice who is listed first among the female beneficiaries of the will of Joan of England, queen of Sicily and fourth wife of Raymond of Toulouse, in 1199. She received 200 marks, while the other ladies received 140 marks (Alice), 100 (Helysabeth), 60 (Philippa), and 15 (Malekakxa). She and Alice also inherited two coffers at Verdun and their contents. The title domicella (diminutive of lady) implies an unmarried girl of noble birth. The name Beatrice would have been appropriate for Isaac's daughter, since both of her maternal great-grandparents bore the name: Beatrice of Saone and the daughter of Count Hugh of Rethel. Her great-great-grandmother, the daughter of Constantine I of Armenia, was also named Beatrice. The unusual Greek name of the maid Malekakxa suggests she may have been picked up in Cyprus, perhaps in association with the Damsel.

George Jeffery calls her Maria, without explanation. Annette Parks uses Beatrice, provisionally. The editors of Matthew Paris call her Bourgogne.

== Childhood ==
The Damsel was born probably in 1177 or 1178. She had a brother, whose name is also unknown. Her parents were probably married in 1175 or 1176. Her father, who was born between 1155 and 1160, had recently been appointed governor of Cilicia (between 1173 and 1175). Her mother, whose name is also unknown, was the daughter of Prince Thoros II of Armenia and Isabella, daughter of Count Joscelin II of Edessa. The Damsel was thus related to the ruling families of the Byzantine Empire and Armenia as well as one of the leading families of the Crusader states.

After fighting broke out between the Byzantine Empire and Armenia, Isaac was captured. This happened perhaps as early as 1176, certainly by 1180. In 1182, he was handed over to Prince Bohemond III of Antioch in a prisoner exchange. He gave his children as hostages to Bohemond in exchange for being released to raise his ransom. When the final payment of 30,000 bezants was stolen by pirates, he refused to re-raise it and the Damsel and her brother thus remained hostages at the court of the prince of Antioch for another two years, when they were released for reasons of state. This was probably around 1184, but Roger of Howden places it around the time of the fall of Jerusalem in 1187.

The death of her brother between 1187 and 1191, left the Damsel the sole heir of her father. According to Howden, Isaac killed his wife and then his son, but this is extremely unlikely. His first wife had probably died by 1184 or else opted to remain in her homeland, in which case he would have obtained a divorce. By 1191, he had remarried to an illegitimate daughter of King William I of Sicily.

== English captivity ==
Between 1 and 22 May 1191, Isaac Komnenos was involved in a conflict with the English contingent of the Third Crusade. He threatened Berengaria, the fiancée of King Richard I of England, and Richard promptly landed troops and took Limassol while Isaac retreated after some skirmishes. On 16 May, the two met and Richard demanded that Isaac pay an indemnity, put a mixed force of cavalry and infantry at his disposal and hand over his daughter and his new wife as hostages. According to Howden, Richard was to be permitted to arrange his daughter's marriage. In return, Richard would enfeoff him with Cyprus. Isaac refused these terms and retreated north. While Richard lay ill at Nicosia, his ally Guy of Lusignan attacked the castle of Kyrenia "by land and sea" on 21 May, having learned that Isaac's daughter was there. According to Roger of Howden and the Chronique d'Ernoul, who have Richard at Kyrenia, the Damsel, who was about fourteen years old, came out of the castle, fell at Richard's feet and surrendered both herself and the fortress. Richard took her hand and helped her to her feet.

According to the Itinerarium regis Ricardi, on learning of his daughter's capture Isaac despaired "because he loved her dearly". Roger of Howden wrote, "he loved [her] more than any other creature". He surrendered on 31 May or 1 June. There is no basis for the claim by H. W. C. Davis that Richard I threatened to kill his captive to induce Isaac's surrender. The poet Ambroise records the reunion of the two in captivity. On 1 June, Richard left Cyprus, taking his prisoners with him to Acre.

The Itinerarium describes her as a "young little thing" (juvenculam parvulam) at the time of her capture. The Chronica anonymi Laudunensis canonici also describes her as handsome (speciosa). Ralph de Diceto thought it necessary to condemn those who accused Richard I of an attraction to his captive. According to the Itinerarium, Richard had her put "in custody, lest she be carried off" (in custodiam ne forte raperetur), which implies physical confinement. The Chronique d'Ernoul and the Histoire d'Eracles claim that she was imprisoned in Margat with her father, but Ralph says that she was "retained in honorable custody in the royal chamber with the two queens", Richard's queen, Berengaria, and his sister Joan, dowager queen of Sicily. Ambroise, commenting on her capture, also says she was sent to the queen not for safekeeping but for her education:

And his young daughter a most fair
And lovely maid of beauty rare
Had sent her to the queen that she
Might well be taught and fittingly.

The chronicles of the Third Crusade note the continued presence of "Isaac's daughter" with the two queens. The three spent Christmas 1191 at Toron and afterwards visited Jerusalem. They embarked to return to Europe on 29 September 1192. They went first to Sicily, where the second wife of Isaac had also returned. There they learned that Richard I had been imprisoned by Duke Leopold V of Austria. Escorted by Stephen de Turnham, they went on to Rome, where they were present on 9 April 1193.

Roger of Howden records that Pope Celestine III honorably received the emperor of Cyprus's daughter. They remained in Rome until June. They left under the escort of Cardinal Melior and went by way of Pisa and Genoa to Marseille, where they were met by King Alfonso II of Aragon, whose brother Raymond Berengar was the count of Provence. Alfonso escorted them through Provence to the County of Toulouse, where they were escorted by Raymond of Saint-Gilles, the future Count Raymond VI, who would later marry both Joan and the Damsel. They arrived in Poitiers in Richard's Duchy of Aquitaine towards the end of 1193.

== Release ==
On 14 February 1193 at Würzburg, Leopold V of Austria signed a treaty with Henry VI, Holy Roman Emperor. By its terms, Leopold would hand Richard I over to Henry, who would hold him prisoner until Isaac and his daughter were released. Leopold and Isaac were second cousins. On 28 March, Richard was handed over and the treaty came into force. On 26 June, Richard signed an agreement with Henry that incorporated the treaty of Würzburg in its entirety. The Damsel was to be handed over to Leopold as guardian at the same time as Richard's niece, Eleanor of Brittany, who was betrothed to Leopold's son Frederick. The negotiations also envisioned the future marriage of the Damsel to Frederick's younger brother, Leopold VI, her third cousin. Richard was released on 2 February 1194, presumably a date corresponding in some way to the release of Isaac.

In 1194, the Damsel was joined by Eleanor of Brittany at the court of Berengaria and Joan, which travelled between Chinon and Rouen. An entry in the pipe rolls of the Exchequer of Normandy for 11 September 1194 records a payment of 168 pounds and 12 shillings to "the daughter of the Count of Brittany and the daughter of the Emperor of Cyprus and their [joint] household". In the autumn of 1194, Duke Leopold V complained to Richard I that the girls had not yet been sent to him.

In December 1194, the Damsel of Cyprus and Eleanor of Brittany departed for Vienna in the company of Baldwin of Béthune. When the latter learned of the death of Leopold V on 31 December, he turned the party around on his own initiative and returned to Normandy. On his deathbed, Leopold V renounced the treaty with Richard I and offered restitution to make peace with the church, which had excommunicated him for imprisoning a crusader. The duke's sons had no interest in pursuing the marriages their father had envisioned for them. Baldwin and his party arrived back in Normandy in the spring of 1196. This coincided with the death of Isaac in late 1195 or early 1196.

== Marriages ==
Nothing is known of the Damsel's movements for the next five years. She probably remained attached to Joan, who in October 1196 became the fourth wife of Raymond VI of Toulouse. Joan died on 24 September 1199, having spent the last part of her marriage in northern France. The Histoire d'Eracles seems to suppose that the Damsel remained a prisoner down to 1199, which perception may be owed to her continued residence with Joan. After the death of Joan, she became Raymond VI's fifth wife, probably in 1199 or 1200. The editorial remark in the Recueil des historiens des croisades that she was a mere concubine is without foundation. The marriage is recorded in the Eracles and by Pierre de Vaux-Cernay, who mistakenly dates it to 1193–1196. The marriage was over by 1203 (probably by October 1202) and Raymond VI married a sixth time in January 1204. The reasons for the end of her first marriage are unknown. It is possible that, as in her second marriage, she married to advance her claim on Cyprus, expecting Raymond VI to go east.

The Damsel's second marriage took place at Marseille in the winter of 1202–1203. She wed Thierry of Flanders, one of the commanders of the Flemish fleet of the Fourth Crusade. It was probably her intention to claim Cyprus. The fleet did not take part in the attack on Constantinople but sailed directly to the Holy Land. It stopped in Cyprus, where Thierry with the support of his men demanded the island in the name of his wife. Rebuffed by King Aimery of Cyprus, the majority of the crusaders, including Thierry and his wife, went on to Armenia. This is the last that is heard of the Damsel. Thierry was in Constantinople in 1207, but it is not known if his wife was with him.

There is possibly a literary echo of Thierry and the Damsel's claim on Cyprus in the vida (short biography) of the troubadour Peire Vidal, who addressed poems to Eudokia and William VIII of Montpellier and may well have crossed paths with the daughter of Isaac. The vida is a short, fictional account written probably around 1240:

...[Peire] took a Greek woman who had been given to him in marriage in Cyprus; and he claimed that she was the niece of the Emperor of Constantinople and through her he should have the right to the Empire. He gathered together all he could obtain to make ships, in order to set out to conquer the empire.

== Notes ==
=== Works cited ===
- Baraton, Édouard (2018). La Romanie orientale: l'empire de Constantinople et ses avatars au Levant à l'époque des Croisades (PhD diss.). Normandie Université.
- Bowie, Colette (2013). "To Have and Have Not: the Dower of Joanna Plantagenet, Queen of Sicily (1177–1189)". In Elena Woodacre (ed.). Queenship in the Mediterranean: Negotiating the Role of the Queen in the Medieval and Early Modern Eras. Palgrave Macmillan. pp. 27–50.
- Fraser, Veronica Mary, ed. (2006). The Songs of Peire Vidal: Translation and Commentary. Peter Lang.
- Gillingham, John (1999). Richard I. Yale University Press.
- Parks, Annette P. (2010). "Rescuing the Maidens from the Tower: Recovering the Stories of Two Female Political Hostages". In Belle S. Tuten; Tracey L. Billado (eds.). Feud, Violence and Practice: Essays in Medieval Studies in Honor of Stephen D. White. Ashgate. pp. 279–292.
- Rudt de Collenberg, W. H. (1968). "L'empereur Isaac de Chypre et sa fille (1155–1207)". Byzantion. 38 (1): 123–179.
- Seabourne, Gwen (2011). Imprisoning Medieval Women: The Non-Judicial Confinement and Abduction of Women in England, c.1170–1509. Ashgate.
