= Sancha of Castile, Queen of Navarre =

Queen of Navarre (c.1139–1177/79)

Sancha of Castile

Queen consort of Navarre
- Tenure: 1157–1177 or 1179
- Born: c. 1139
- Died: 5 August 1177 or 1179 (aged 37–40)
- Burial: Pamplona Cathedral
- Spouse: Sancho VI of Navarre (m. 1153)
- Issue more...: Berengaria, Queen of England; Sancho VII, King of Navarre; Blanche, Countess of Champagne
- House: Ivrea
- Father: Alfonso VII of León and Castile
- Mother: Berenguela of Barcelona

Sancha of Castile (c. 1139–5 August 1177 or 1179) was daughter of Alfonso VII of León and Castile and his first wife Berengaria of Barcelona. Sancha was the fifth child of seven born to her parents.

On 20 July 1153, Sancha married Sancho VI of Navarre. She was responsible for bringing his kingdom into the political orbit of Europe. As "la reyna de Navarra, filla del emperador" (the queen of Navarre, daughter of the Emperor) her 5 August 1179 death was reported in the Annales Toledanos, while in the Chronacles of Navarre she died in August 1179.

After Sancha married into Navarre, Alfonso VII gave the same name, Sancha, to his daughter by his second wife, Richeza of Poland. This half-sister married King Alfonso II of Aragon in 1174.

== Issue ==
Sancho and Sancha's children were:

- Sancho VII
- Ferdinand
- Ramiro, Bishop of Pamplona
- Berengaria (died 1230 or 1232), married King Richard I of England
- Constance
- Blanche, married Count Theobald III of Champagne, then acted as regent of Champagne, and finally as regent of Navarre

Sancha was buried in Pamplona.

Sancha of Castile, Queen of Navarre Castilian House of Ivrea Born: c. 1139 Died: 1179
Royal titles
Preceded by Urraca of Castile	Queen consort of Navarre; 1157–1179	Succeeded by Constance of Toulouse
