= Raymond VI of Toulouse =

Raymond VI
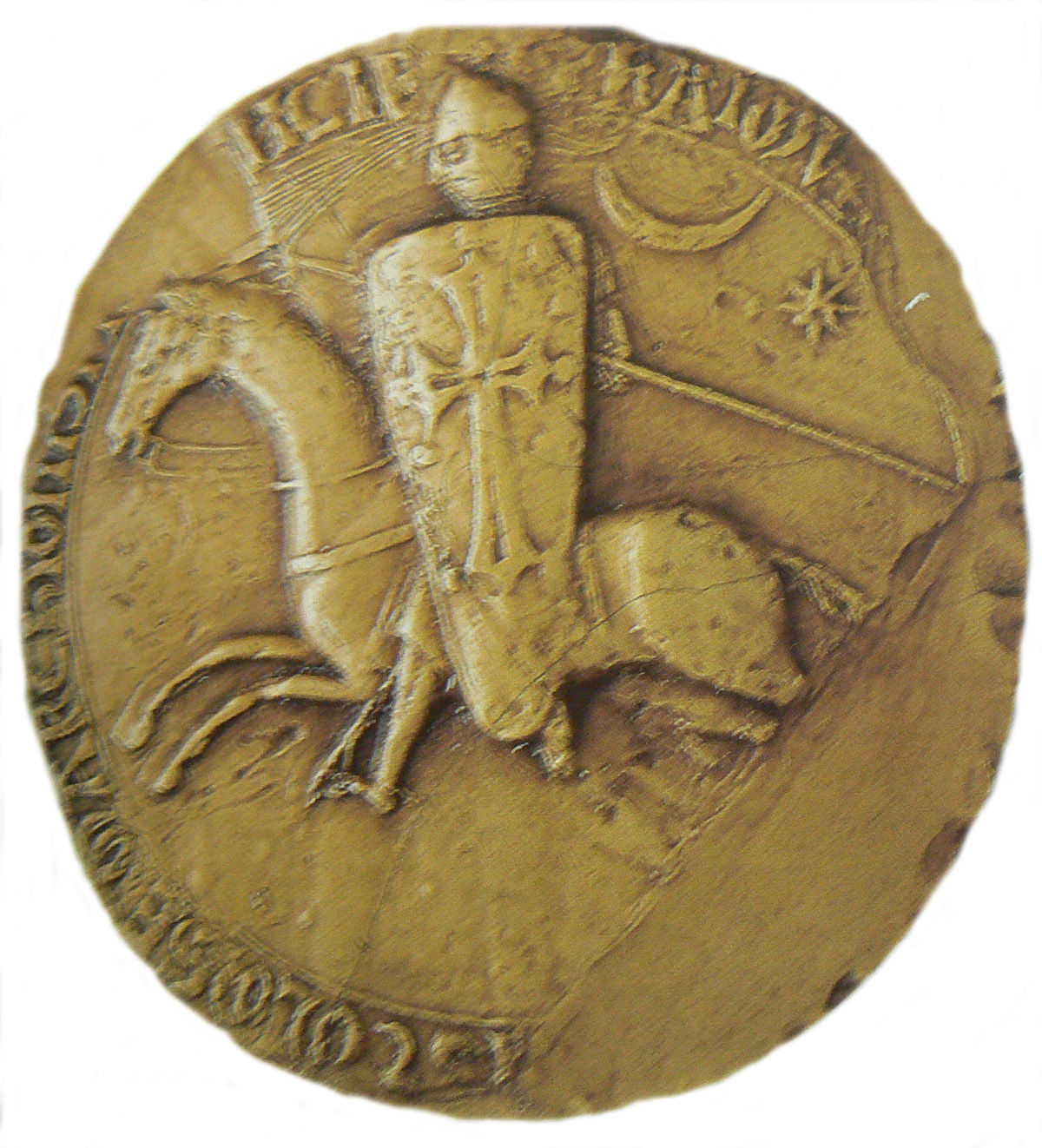
- Seal of Raymond VI

Count of Toulouse
- Reign: 1194–1222
- Predecessor: Raymond V
- Successor: Raymond VII
- Born: 27 October 1156; Saint-Gilles, Gard, Occitanie
- Died: 2 August 1222 (aged 65)
- Spouse: Ermessende of Pelet (m. 1172; died 1176); Beatrice of Béziers (m. 1178; div. 1193); Joan of England (m. 1196; died 1199); Damsel of Cyprus (m. 1200; div. 1202); Eleanor of Aragon (m. 1204)
- Issue: Constance of Toulouse; Raymond VII, Count of Toulouse
- House: Rouergue
- Father: Raymond V, Count of Toulouse
- Mother: Constance of France

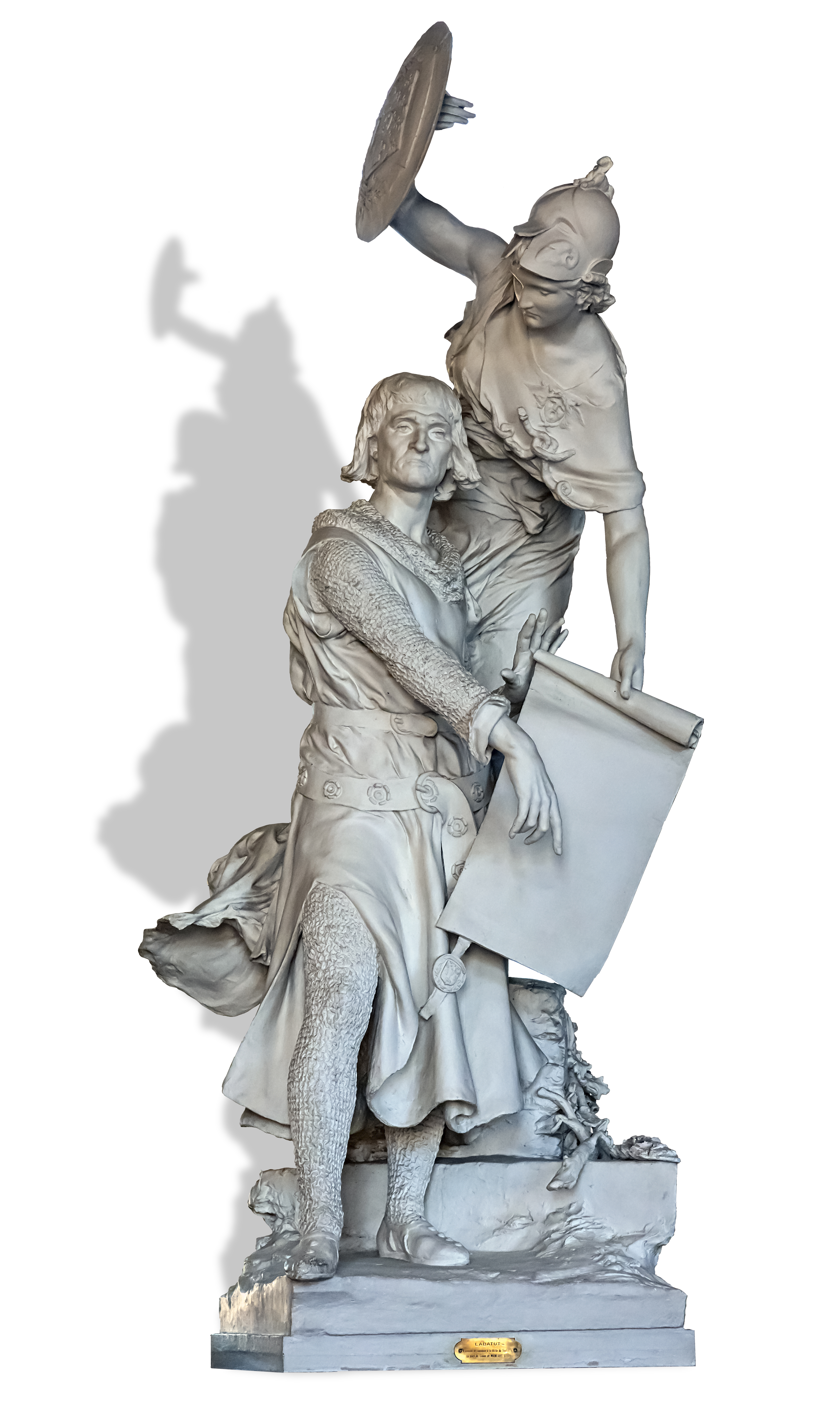
A depiction of Raymond VI at the Salle des Illustres in Toulouse

Raymond VI (Occitan: Ramon or Raimon; 27 October 1156 – 2 August 1222) was Count of Toulouse and Marquis of Provence from 1194 to 1222. He was also Count of Melgueil (as Raymond IV) from 1173 to 1190. Raymond's conflicts with Pope Innocent III over his tolerance of the Cathars prompted his excommunication and the start of the Albigensian Crusade.

== Early life ==
Raymond was born at Saint-Gilles, Gard, the son of Raymond V and Constance of France. His maternal grandparents were Louis VI of France and his second wife Adélaide de Maurienne. His maternal uncles included Louis VII of France. In 1194 he succeeded his father as count of Toulouse. He immediately re-established peace with both Alfonso II of Aragon and with the Trencavel family.

== Patron of the Arts ==
Count Raimon VI of Toulouse was the most powerful patron of troubadours in the South of France. He was a known friend of Raimon de Miraval, with whom he exchanged the reciprocal pseudonym Audiart.

== Problems with the Church ==
Raymond VI was arguably the first target of the Albigensian Crusade (1209–1229).

Raymond VI held vast territories but his control of them was problematic. Aside from theoretically owing allegiance to the King of France, Raymond held Provence as a vassal of the Holy Roman Emperor. Henry II of England controlled neighboring Aquitaine through his wife Eleanor of Aquitaine, who had a claim to Toulouse through her grandmother, Philippa of Toulouse, daughter of William IV, Count of Toulouse. Alfonso II of Aragon was involved in the affairs of Languedoc, stimulating emigration from the north to colonize newly reconquered lands in Aragon.

In Toulouse, Raymond maintained the communal freedoms, extended exemptions from taxation, and extended his protection to the communal territory. A poet and a man of culture, he hated war but did not lack energy.

According to Henri Pirenne, "At the end of the 12th century Languedoc was swarming with those mystics who aspired to lead the Church and the age back to apostolic simplicity, condemning both the religious hierarchy and the social order". At first Innocent III tried to deal with the Cathars by peaceful conversion, sending into the affected regions a number of legates or representatives. Count Raymond declined to assist, although constantly embroiled with his vassals, and given the autonomy of the towns, Kenneth Setton questions whether Raymond "could have coped effectively with the challenge of heresy even if he had wished to do so".

The legates sent from Rome and France received little support as they were considered foreign reformers. Papal legate Pierre de Castelnau was sent to address Raymond's tolerance for the practice of the Cathars, but withdrew for six months in 1206 out of concerns for his safety.

Pierre's assassination on 15 January 1208, led to Raymond's excommunication. Following this assassination, Raymond sought reconciliation with Pope Innocent III, yet despite his overtures Innocent chose to allow crusade leaders a freehand. Raymond was ultimately able to briefly lift his excommunication in June 1209, after agreeing to be publicly stripped to the waist and flogged at Saint Giles, where papal legate Pierre de Castelnau had been assassinated, which was followed by him swearing an oath of loyalty to the Church. This display of repentance temporarily reconciled him with the Church and Innocent III, and Raymond then ostensibly aligned himself with the Crusaders. The Crusaders in July 1209 directed attention to the lands of Raymond's rival Raymond Roger Trencavel, leading to the capture and massacre of Béziers, the siege and capture of Carcassonne, and the death of Trencavel.

However, Raymond's continued reluctance to pursue his vassals and act against his own subjects accused of heresy was soon seen by the Crusaders and Innocent III as a failure to uphold his oath made in 1209. As a result, in 1211, Raymond's excommunication was reiterated by papal legates, while the Council of Montpellier placed an Interdict over the County of Toulouse. More of a diplomat than a soldier, he was unable to stop the advance of Simon de Montfort, who captured Toulouse. Following the Battle of Muret, Raymond was exiled to England under his former brother-in-law John, King of England.

In November 1215, Raymond and his son (the later Raymond VII, Count of Toulouse) were in Rome with Raymond-Roger, Count of Foix on the occasion of the Fourth Lateran Council to vindicate themselves and dispute the loss of their territories. Raymond's son-in-law, Pierre-Bermond II of Sauve, was also there to lay claim to the county of Toulouse, but this claim failed. Raymond and his son went from Rome to Genoa and thence to Marseille in February 1216. Raymond's son set out from Marseille to regain the family territories in Provence; in May 1216 he besieged Beaucaire and captured it on August 24.

Meanwhile, Raymond went to Aragon, hoping to rally support. From there he engaged in secret negotiations with leaders in Toulouse during 1216. Simon de Montfort possibly believed that Raymond was on his way to the city in September 1216; at any rate he returned in great haste from Beaucaire and conducted a partial sack of the city, apparently intended as punishment. Finally, on 12 September 1217, Raymond re-entered Toulouse again. Simon de Montfort immediately besieged the city once more. Simon was killed during the siege (25 June 1218); his son Amaury VI of Montfort took his place, and for five years the Crusade faltered. The failure of Louis VIII's campaigns, from 1219 to 1226, finally permitted Raymond, and his son and successor, to recover most of their territories.

Berry College military history professor Laurence W. Marvin made Raymond the subject of his entry in the 2022 anthology The Worst Military Leaders in History. Raymond's early diffidence in the face of Church sanctions such as excommunication and interdict cost him serious credibility with allies later on, to the point that they dismissed sound military advice based on his experience. They also recalled his desultory prosecution of the 1211 siege of Castelnaudary. There, Raymond had built his own heavily fortified camp a great distance from the town, as if he were more worried about being attacked himself, and failed to blockade the area, allowing Simon to regularly resupply. At the time he was also ridiculed for restricting himself to the use of catapults against the walls and not attacking Simon's soldiers on sorties outside the walls to repair the damage.

== Death ==
Following an abrupt and unexpected illness that left him mostly speechless, Raymond died in August 1222. But from what was said, he was still able to remember and understand things because he extended his hands in a show of devotion to the Abbot of Saint-Sernin, as soon as the Abbot hurried to his side. He kissed a pall bearing a cross when the Brothers of the Hospital of St. John (the Knights Hospitaller) threw it over him, and then he died unexpectedly. His body was taken to their home, but it was never buried there and is still unburied as of now.

In 1998, there was a new twist to this story: during excavations at the Hôtel Saint-Jean in Toulouse, the site of the former Grand Priory of the Knights Hospitaller, a medieval sarcophagus was discovered, and for a moment it was believed that it might contain the bones of Raymond VI. The mayor of Toulouse, Dominique Baudis, took the opportunity to ask Pope John Paul II to lift Raymond VI's excommunication, without success.

== Marriages ==
Raymond was married five times:

1. On 11 December 1172, to Ermessende of Pelet, Countess of Melgueil. She died in 1176 without issue.
2. In 1178 to Beatrice of Béziers, sister of Roger II Trencavel. She left Raymond and retired to a nunnery. Raymond VI and Beatrice had one daughter:
  1. Constance of Toulouse, who was married first to King Sancho VII of Navarre, and secondly to Pierre-Bermond II of Sauve, Lord of Anduze.
3. In October 1196 at Rouen to Joan of England, daughter of Henry II of England and Eleanor of Aquitaine. Their marriage included Richard I's renunciation of his claim to Toulouse, ending the feud with the ducal house of Aquitaine. She died on 4 September 1199, in childbirth as a veiled nun at Fontevraud Abbey. Joan and Raymond VI had three children:
  1. Raymond VII, Count of Toulouse (1197–1249); In 1200, he first married Damsel the daughter of Isaac Komnenos of Cyprus. They divorced in late 1202, and she remarried to Thierry of Flanders by early 1203. His second wife was Eleanor of Aragon, daughter of King Alfonso II of Aragon and Sancha of Castile. In older historiography Raymond is said to have married Burgundia of Lusignan, a daughter of King Aimery of Cyprus. But historically, they never married and he was instead married to Damsel from 1200 – 1203.
  2. Joan of Toulouse (1198–1255), second wife of Bernard II de la Tour, Lord of la Tour;
  3. Richard of Toulouse (1199), lived just long enough to be baptised.

== In art ==
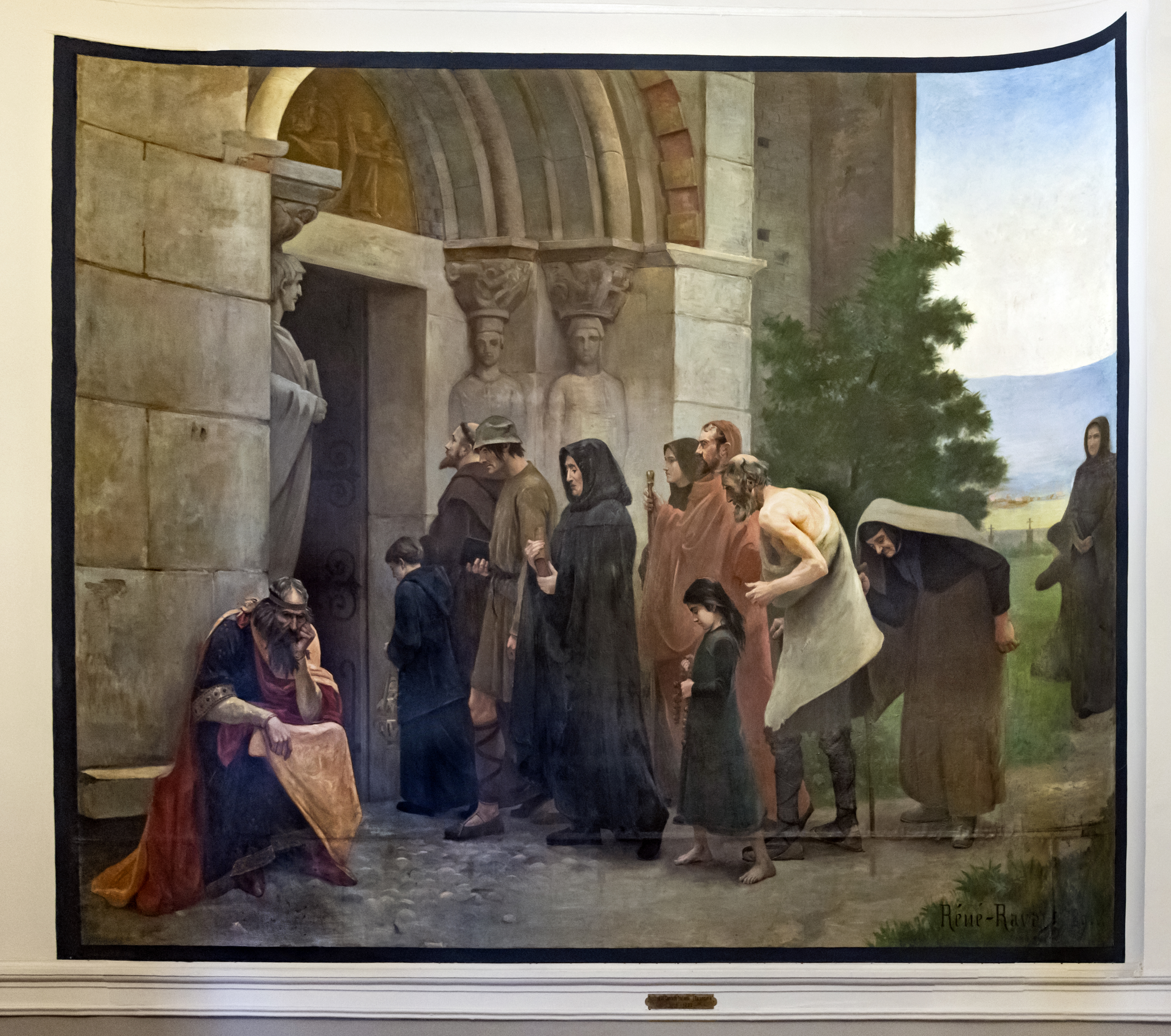
Raimond VI Count of Toulouse, the excommunicated 1156-1222, Capitole de Toulouse.

Raymond VI is represented as one of four figures on the ceiling of the Minnesota Supreme Court in the United States. His painting is next to Moses, Confucius, and Socrates, each painting representing an aspect of law. Raymond VI's painting is entitled "The Adjustment of Conflicting Interests", and the scene is of Raymond VI of Toulouse standing before the papal legate in 1208. Raymond argued successfully for city freedoms, extended exemptions from taxation, and protection of the communal territory from the church. Not wanting to target his Cathar vassals, he also defended, albeit with less success—since it became one of the causes of the Albigensian Crusade—the idea of religious freedom. The paintings were made by John LaFarge in 1903.

In 1889, in a painting exhibited at the Capitole in Toulouse and entitled "Raimond VI Count of Toulouse, the excommunicated 1156-1222", the painter René-Henri Ravaut depicted Raymond VI left at the door of the Church.

== Sources ==
- Cheyette, Fredric L. (2001). Ermengard of Narbonne and the World of the Troubadours. Cornell University Press.
- Collenberg, Wipertus-Hugo Rudt de (1983). Familles de l'Orient latin, XIIe-XIVe siècles (in French). Variorum Reprints. ISBN 978-0-86078-124-0.
- Graham-Leigh, Elaine (2005). The Southern French Nobility and the Albigensian Crusade. The Boydell Press.
- Haluska-Rausch, Elizabeth (2005). "Widows and Noble Remarriage in Eleventh- and Twelfth-Century Montpellier". In Hayes-Healy, S. (ed.). Medieval Paradigms. Vol. I: Essays in Honor of Jeremy duQuesnay Adams. Palgrave Macmillan. pp. 99–114.
- McNamara, Jo Ann Kay (1996). Sisters in Arms: Catholic Nuns Through Two Millennia. Harvard University Press.
- Smith, Damian J. (2004). Innocent III and the Crown of Aragon: The Limits of Papal Authority. Church, Faith and Culture in the Medieval West. Aldershot: Ashgate.
- Sumption, Jonathan (1978). The Albigensian Crusade. Faber and Faber.
- Tyerman, Christopher (2006). God's War: A New History of the Crusades. The Belknap Press.
- William of Puylaurens (2003). Sibly, W. A.; Sibly, M. D. (eds.). The Chronicle of William of Puylaurens: The Albigensian Crusade and its Aftermath. The Boydell Press.
- Rist, Rebecca (2009). The Papacy and Crusading in Europe, 1198-1245. Bloomsbury Academic.
- Rowlands, Ifor W. (2018). England and Europe in the Reign of Henry III (1216-1272). Routledge.
- Sibly, W.A.; Sibly, M.D., eds. (2003). The Chronicle of William of Puylaurens: The Albigensian Crusade and its Aftermath. The Boydell Press.

Preceded by Raymond V	Count of Toulouse; 1194–1222	Succeeded by Raymond VII
