= Ann Trindade =

Australian historian

Ann Trindade is a Principal Fellow in the History Department at the University of Melbourne, Victoria, Australia. She was educated at Lady Margaret Hall, Oxford and is the author of a biography of Berengaria of Navarre.

== Bibliography ==
- Berengaria: In Search of Richard the Lionheart's Queen. (1999) Four Courts Press. ISBN 9781851824342.
