= Thierry of Flanders (flourished 1197–1207) =

Flemish nobleman and crusader

Thierry of Flanders (Latin: Theodoricus de Flandria, Old French: Tyerri de Flandres) was a Flemish nobleman and crusader active in 1197–1207.

Thierry was the illegitimate son of Count Philip I of Flanders and thus the first cousin of Count Baldwin IX of Flanders, whose mother, Margaret, was Philip's sister. In his official acts, however, Baldwin generally referred to Philip as "my nephew". He had no title and was qualified simply as "the son of Count Philip". His grandfather and namesake, Count Thierry of Flanders, was a distinguished crusader and his father died on the Third Crusade in 1191.

In June or July 1197, Thierry witnessed the treaty of alliance between Baldwin and King Richard I of England. Following the lead of his cousin, he joined the Fourth Crusade in 1202 and was one of the commanders of the Flemish fleet alongside John II of Nesle and Nicholas of Mailly. He and Baldwin were still in Flanders in April 1202. The fleet sailed in the summer of 1202, attacked an unnamed Muslim city on the African coast and overwintered in Marseille. During this stop in Marseille, Thierry married the "damsel of Cyprus", the daughter and heiress of the Emperor Isaac of Cyprus. He was her second husband after her marriage to Count Raymond VI of Toulouse failed. Probably she hoped to recover her inheritance on the crusade. The only source for this marriage is the Chronicle of Ernoul and Bernard the Treasurer. At Marseille, the fleet received news of the planned attack on Constantinople and Baldwin ordered it to rendezvous with him off Methoni. Ignoring this order, it sailed directly for the Holy Land.

The Flemish fleet stopped in Cyprus, where Thierry, with the support of the Flemish knights, pressed King Aimery of Cyprus to hand the kingdom over to him. Aimery refused and ordered him to leave his kingdom, whereupon Thierry went to the kingdom of Cilician Armenia and entered the service of King Leo I, since Aimery also held the kingdom of Jerusalem at the time. Cilicia was the homeland of his wife's mother, who was a daughter of Prince Thoros II.

Thierry and his wife went to Constantinople sometime after Baldwin's imperial coronation in 1204. He is not attested there until 1207, but his fellow commander, Nicholas of Mailly, was definitely there by 1204. Evidence from the Arabic chronicler Ibn al-Athīr suggests that the Latin emperors in Constantinople may have controlled Cyprus during the minority of Aimery's successor, Hugh I, from 1205 to 1210, a fact which may be connected to the presence in Constantinople of a pretender to the Cypriot throne (Thierry). In July or August 1207, Thierry, his cousin Eustace and Anseau de Cayeux were sent by the Emperor Henry to raid Bulgaria. This episode, recorded by Geoffrey of Villehardouin, is the last that is known of him.

== Bibliography ==
- Longnon, J. (1978). Les compagnons de Villehardouin: Recherches sur les croisés de la quatrième croisade. Librairie Droz.
- Queller, D. E.; Compton, T. K.; Campbell, D. A. (1974). "The Fourth Crusade: The Neglected Majority". Speculum. 49 (3): 441–465. doi:10.2307/2851751.
- Rudt de Collenberg, W. H. (1968). "L'empereur Isaac de Chypre et sa fille (1155–1207)". Byzantion. 38 (1): 123–179.
- Van Tricht, Filip (2011). The Latin Renovatio of Byzantium: The Empire of Constantinople (1204–1228). Brill.
