= L'Épau Abbey =

Coordinates: 47°59′28″N 0°14′31″E

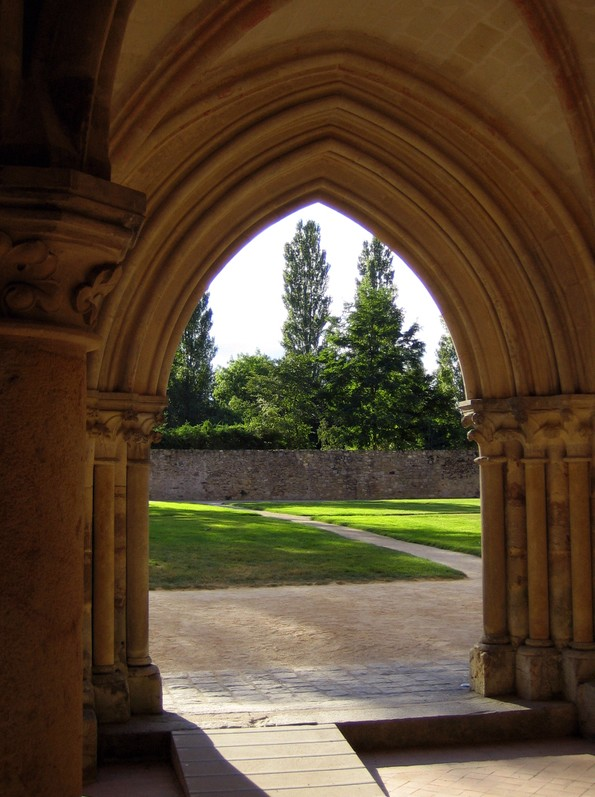
- Entrance to the Chapter House
- L'Épau Abbey
- Country: France
- Denomination: Cistercians

History
- Founded: 1229
- Founder: Berengaria of Navarre

L'Épau Royal Abbey (French: Abbaye Royale de l'Épau) is a former Cistercian abbey founded by the English queen Berengaria of Navarre in 1229. It is located on the outskirts of the city of Le Mans, on the left bank of the Huisne, adjoining the town of Yvré-l'Évêque. The abbey was suppressed in the French Revolution. The surviving buildings came close to destruction on several occasions, but their preservation was finally assured in 1958 by the General Council of the Sarthe department.

== History ==
=== Origins ===
Perseigne Abbey, built within the confines of Norman Maine by the powerful William III of Bellême, can be considered the oldest Cistercian abbey in Maine. It was built in 1145, and is today situated in the commune of Neufchâtel-en-Saosnois. All that remains of it today is a section of wall. During the second millennium, Le Mans saw the construction of several abbeys. Religious faith was booming in the town: The renowned La Couture abbey was built, as were the Saint-Pierre, Saint-Paul and Saint-Vincent abbeys. Mostly, the abbeys were built in privileged areas in the heart of the forest. In 1199, the English queen Berengaria of Navarre was beside herself with grief. Her husband, King Richard the Lionheart, had succumbed to his wounds in a crossbow battle at Châlus in Haute-Vienne. The Queen was removed from power in Maine but settled among the Plantagenet dynasty in 1204. She became a dowager. In addition, she began to spend all of her time at the Palace of the Count of Maine. Legend has it that the Queen found asylum, but not happiness, in the town. Certain local government figures, collaborating with her mother-in-law, Eleanor of Aquitaine, or brother-in-law, John Lackland, constantly waged battle with the Queen, trying to steal the land granted to her by the French king Philip Augustus. Only after 26 years in exile did the Queen, aged 59, decide to found an abbey.

=== Construction of the abbey ===
Saint-Benoit rules maintained that an abbey built outside the city limits should respect the obligations of spiritual sanctuary. However, the Queen elected to have the abbey built between the town and forest, at the city limits of Le Mans. The Queen built it for her own salvation. Both history and legend suggest that this abbey may also have been built to redeem the fortunes of Plantagenet Kings. On 25 March 1229, the Queen ordered the Citeaux monks to begin construction of Notre-Dame-de-l'Epau. Furthermore, the Queen was a benefactor of this order. The decision to choose monks residing locally was not left to chance. The Queen was also a great friend of confidant Adam de Perseigne, a priest at the monastery of the same name and long-time confidant of Richard the Lionheart. Father of the Queen, Sanche VI, himself founded the abbey at Oliva in 1140.

This tranquil site was chosen as the river Huisne was teeming with fish. Although Louis IX ceded the Espal grounds to the Queen, it would be the monks of Coëffort who would be troublesome to Queen Berengaria. This brotherhood asked the Queen for financial compensation, claiming that the land had been left to them by Arthur of Brittany, Queen Berengaria's nephew.

Plans for the abbey were classic with construction respecting the style of other Cistercian buildings. Construction took from 1230 to 1365. The early phases of construction went smoothly. Four years after construction began, the Bishop of Le Mans Geoffroy de Laval placed the monastery under the patronage of both Notre-Dame and Saint John the Baptiste. The main buildings were not finished until 1280.

=== The Hundred Years' War ===
In March 1365, in the middle of the Hundred Years' War, the people of Le Mans burned the building of their own accord. As the monks had left the abbey, the inhabitants feared that enemy troops would seize the building and use it as a base from which to attack the town. In fact, it was the noblemen who forced the people to take action. The church was the part of the abbey to suffer the most damage. However, the following year the bourgeois of Le Mans decided to completely rebuild the damaged parts of the church. But they were not the ones who financed the renovation. Money was difficult to come by in the region and donations to religious orders were rare.

=== 14th–17th centuries ===
All the damaged buildings were renovated between 1400 and 1444. Charles VI raised finances by taxing the local population. One of the main artisans of the church restoration was Guillaume de Bonneville.

=== 18th–19th centuries ===
At the beginning of the French Revolution, the abbey was transformed into a gigantic agricultural outbuilding. Yet the abbey was already listed as a "historic monument." Its cultural value was already recognised by the old regime, in particular the ancient church, its sacristy and most of all its 18th-century staircase.

In July 1940, the German Wehrmacht turned the abbey into a "Frontlager" to house French officer POWs who were taken after the armistice in the region of the Sarthe. Eventually, this camp was closed and the prisoners were moved to Oflag XIIIA. After the war, the elected politicians of the Sarthe and Mayenne regions voted unanimously to buy back and restore the abbey which had been a monastic retreat for half a millennium. In 1958, the building was acquired by the regional council of the Sarthe for 11 million old francs. The abbey underwent a long restoration, strictly observing the 13th-century architectural style. Both the National School of Fine Arts of Le Mans and Paris actively participated. The church, the sacristy, the chapter house, the staircase, and the cellar had already been listed since 1925 and the façades and roof were first listed in 1961 before these were reclassified in 1973 and again in 2005. At this point, the abbey became both a place to visit and host events. Between 1965 and 1990, the abbey became popular for cultural functions, in particular for classical music events, conferences, and exhibitions. The location is also used as the chair for the departmental assembly, in particular the 18th-century wing, which was restored in 1990. By 1991, a total of 60 million new francs had been spent overall on renovations.

== The Queen's tomb ==
As she neared death, Berengaria of Navarra made clear her wish to be buried within the Abbey. Doubt remains over the exact location of her burial. Although the recumbent statue and tomb are there today, the exact whereabouts of her burial are unknown. In 1960, Pierre Térouanne found a wholly intact female skeleton in the basement of the chapter house. A small oak box has always followed the recumbent figure of the Queen despite its many pilgrimages since the Revolution. The marking Ossa Berangeria / 1230-1672-1821-1861 appears on the box. In reality, the Queen died before the Abbey could be finished. The only possibility for her burial site would have been in the abbey grounds. Her remains should therefore be situated underneath the tomb, a medieval work of art from the 13th century. On the tomb, the recumbent statue is similar to that of Aliénor d'Aquitaine at Fontevrault Abbey. The Queen is resting on her back, dressed in a long robe tied at the waist by a belt. The royal crown is placed on her head, which rests on a cushion. At her feet, a lion is depicted slaying a greyhound. The lion and crown are symbols of royalty while the money-bag by her belt represents generosity. Her hands, folded over her chest, hold a book, the cover of which represents her own burial. In 1365, the building was devastated by fire and the tomb would certainly have been moved to the chapter house. It was definitely brought into the abbey in 1672, where it remained until the French Revolution when the building was sold as a clergy asset. The building became a gigantic agricultural grange and the tomb was lost carelessly under straw. Charles Albert Shotard, specially brought over from England, had to intervene and enforce that the tomb be respected. Pierre Thoré, the owner of the grange at the abbey, resolved himself to be separated from the tomb shortly afterwards. In December 1821, it was transferred to the northern transept of the cathedral. In 1861, the tomb was moved to the southern transept to make room for another tomb; that of Monseigneur Bouvier. The Queen's tomb was again displaced in 1920 when it was moved back to the northern transept in order to make room for a monument for the priests of the diocese who died for France. It would be 1970 before the Queen's tomb would finally be brought back to the chapter house at the Abbaye de l'Epau. It was placed above the mysterious remains found by Pierre Terouanne. This skeleton belonged to a woman who died in her sixties, or the age of the Queen at the time of her death. What is inside the box attached to the Queen's tomb is still a mystery to this day.
