= Propinquity (novel) =

Book by John Macgregor

- Editor: Lisa Berriman
- Author: John Macgregor
- Cover artist: Maureen Prichard
- Language: English
- Subject: Religious conspiracy; gnosticism; Westminster Abbey; cryogenics
- Genre: Fiction; historical fiction; mystery
- Publisher: 1986 Wakefield Press/South Australian Government (orig.); 2013 John Macgregor (current)
- Publication place: Australia
- Media type: Trade paperback, e-book, print-on-demand paperback
- Pages: 273
- Awards: Biennial Adelaide Festival Award for Literature (manuscript) (1986); shortlisted Age Book of the Year (1987)
- ISBN: 0-949268-99-2 (original, Wakefield Press)

Propinquity is a 1986 novel by Australian author/journalist John Macgregor. The manuscript won the Adelaide Festival Biennial Award for Literature; the novel was short-listed for The Age Book of the Year. Its author was compared by critics with PG Wodehouse, Don DeLillo, Julian Barnes, Umberto Eco, and Australian Nobellist Patrick White. Despite its critical success, the collapse of the original publisher meant that Propinquity did not reach a wide audience, although in 2013 it was released on Amazon as a Kindle e-book and a CreateSpace print-on-demand paperback.

Propinquity describes a group of Oxford medical undergraduates trying to bring a medieval English queen - buried deep under Westminster Abbey - back to life. In reviving her, the students intend to expose a 2,000-year-old conspiracy by the Church to repress gnosis - the experiential core of spiritual teaching - to maintain its political power.

The attempt is led by a male Oxford medical student and the daughter of the Dean of Westminster, a medieval scholar, who had seen her father visit the secret tomb as a child, and later recalled the memories.

== Plot ==
Propinquity begins in the 1970s at Geelong Grammar School, with central character and narrator Clive Lean and his friends surreptitiously smoking cigarettes, and contemplating their "maddening" girl-less existence, beside a small bay near the school. The friends end up together at Melbourne University, until Clive's wealthy father dies on the golf course - bequeathing him the family plastics business. Clive is not a success as a businessman, and within two years he is forced to sell Plas-E-Quip to a tramp in the Botanical Gardens, in a bid to evade back taxes. He flees the country.

At Oxford University – where he enrolls to complete his medical degree – he falls in with a second group of friends, and on a trip to London meets Samantha "Sam" Goode, daughter of the Dean Of Westminster Abbey and a medieval scholar. As they draw closer to each other, Sam begins to drop hints about the Abbey's housing ancient secrets. She soon she reveals that beneath the floor in the Chapel of Henry VII lies the body of Berengaria of Navarre, widow of Richard Lionheart.

An intrepid soul, Berengaria had been a follower of the Indian mystic Kabir, who had taught gnosis - the direct connection with the divine, which did away with religion, priests and even belief. On her return to London, Berengaria met the monks at Westminster, who had kept the flame of gnosis alive for twelve centuries. The Westminster monks had originally been initiated by Joseph of Arimathea, the provider of Jesus's tomb, who had travelled to Britain after the crucifixion. A reading of one of Berengaria's letters – entombed underground with her – leads Sam to the startling conclusion that the queen is not dead, but in a trance induced by a medieval herb.

When they learn there is an herbal antidote, but that it no longer grows in Africa, Clive travels to Haiti, where he hopes the herb may have been brought by African slaves. Here he teams up with his old school and university friend Alistair - now a revolutionary fighting "Baby Doc" Duvalier's government – in search of the elusive antidote. Clive eventually purloins it from a witchdoctor. Back in London, the visits by Clive and Sam to Berengaria's underground tomb have been discovered by the Dean, and the group's efforts face ruin.

Now their task is to remove the body from the grasp of the Church, enabling them to revive Berengaria. Several of the group create loud distractions in other parts of the Abbey as Clive goes underground and grabs Berengaria's body. The queen is revived with the antidote herb at a secret workroom, and they spirit her out of the country. The group arrives in Mullumbimby in rural Australia, where Lake - Clive's best friend from school - now lives. They stay in his house. Despite Clive's reviving her from eight centuries of sleep, Berengeria does not appear to take to him. A protracted longueur ensues, as the two try, and fail, to communicate.

On a shopping trip to nearby Byron Bay, Clive is spotted by a policeman and arrested. He is extradited to Melbourne, where he faces charges of tax evasion. In jail he meets the tramp to whom he had sold his company, and bribes him to give favorable evidence; he is acquitted. Meanwhile, the Church has been announcing that the kidnap of Berengaria never occurred. On the courtroom steps, Clive confirms the claim: saying that there had never been a body under Westminster Abbey, and that the "kidnap" had been a hoax arising from a student bet. After the trial, Sam reveals she has been given Berengaria's gnosis, and discusses its revelatory qualities with Clive. He shows an interest in learning it. He also tells Sam that he loves her, and wants to settle down with her and have children. She laughs, replying, "I don't think you could breed in captivity".

== Reception ==
The "Propinquity" manuscript won Australia's most competitive literary award, the Adelaide Festival Award for Literature in 1986. After publication it was shortlisted for the 1987 Age Book of the Year. Once published, Propinquity drew praise mixed with criticism from reviewers.

It is a novel close to unclassifiability… Propinquity…might be mentioned in the same sentence as those masters of veridical clowning, Flann O'Brien and Joseph Hasek, he of Good Soldier Schweik immortality. Macgregor has a way to go to hit their position, but he has produced a first novel of great talent.

(Stephen Knight, "Times on Sunday")

Macgregor writes with plenty of wit, some verve, and lots of exuberance... The story makes you want to read on - and on. It's a bit of a mixture of PG Wodehouse and Patrick White. You have to be prepared for Wodehouse mysticism and White jokes, and that makes this a very individual novel indeed...

(John Hanrahan, The Age)

The over-the-top plot requires so much of the reader's attention and imagination that it is easy to forget that there is some very nice writing in Propinquity... [The author] won the Adelaide festival National Manuscript award ... there is plenty of evidence here is a talent worth watching. The novel does get bogged down near the halfway point ... but this seems a minor complaint... Escapism with intelligence.

(Andrew Stokes, The Australian)

In many ways this is a very amateurish book - though perhaps in a good sense.

(Dr Barry Westburg, "Radio 5UV")

== Background ==
In 1977 John Macgregor received a $3,000 Young Writer's Grant from the Australian Government on the strength of Propinquity's first four chapters. (The novel had a working title of Our Resurrection.)

In the early 1980s, Australian novelist Hal Porter - who part-read the manuscript - suggested Macgregor send it to veteran literary publisher John Ferguson in Sydney. Ferguson was enthusiastic about the novel, but later relinquished it due to financial difficulties.

In 1986, Macgregor entered Propinquity in the manuscript section of the Adelaide Festival's Biennial Award for Literature, which it won.

In addition to $15,000 in prize money, the award mandated publication by Wakefield Press - a publishing house then owned by the South Australian Government. As Propinquity was being released, the Wakefield Press was sold to The Adelaide Review, which had no book-publishing experience. Propinquity sat in the warehouse, missing the sales bandwagon.

=== Themes ===
The novel embodies propinquity – "nearness in place or spirit". In Australia, the group of very close friends share an at times poignant love for each other. Clive forms a second such group in Oxford, England. The two groups eventually intersect. This aspect of the work was singled out by Australian academic Dr Barry Westburg:

Macgregor is rediscovering, behind the centuries-old dogmas of romantic love, another kind of connection between human beings: the rather antique term 'propinquity'.

A second theme is the novel's spirituality. When religion figured in Australian novels of the time, it was most often Catholicism. However throughout the story, the central characters moves steadily toward something more mystical - something "beyond the lyric imprecision of words". The novel gently promotes the idea that spirituality is rooted in experience, with belief and dogma meaning little - except to those who employ it to gain power over the gullible. Westburg said:

Truth is simple in this philosophical novel - it is just hard to get at the simplicity of it in a world of such spatial and material dimensions.

What seems to be a preposterous plot involving the resurrection of a female Christ figure thus contains a profound core.

It is the depth of visionariness of this novel, its clinging to its perhaps unfashionable spiritual centre, that will reward many readers.

Macgregor wrote about his novel:

People my age did not take on a belief system simply because their parents had. The New Age groups (called cults by some) were the revolutionary vanguard of this thinking - and my belonging to one is what brought Propinquity into being. At bottom it represents the new dispensation I saw taking shape.

I was wrong about my group, but the notion that the old monoliths were tottering and would collapse has proven right. Churches are empty now across Christendom.

Propinquity is saying that nearly everything we have been taught about God is nonsense. That's now a mainstream belief.

Propinquity also forges the theme – later exploited in The Da Vinci Code – of an historical secret suppressed by the Church for 2,000 years. In Da Vinci this secret is the feminine aspect of spirituality; in Propinquity it is both this and the gnosis or "inner essence" of spiritual experience. (Macgregor has not criticised The Da Vinci Code, saying, "To me this is a nicely-constructed novel. Often critics don't understand how hard good structure is.")

A further motif is anarchism. Narrator Clive Lean seems unmoved by society's laws, and continually breaks them. He evades income tax by selling his company to a tramp, takes some of the world's first designer drugs, steals Berengaria's body and her documents from the Church of England, handcuffs a priest to a parking sign, drives a getaway car, knocks a policeman to the ground in resisting arrest, and bribes a witness to not testify against him.

== Author ==
John Macgregor grew up in Melbourne, and attended the private school Geelong Grammar (featured in the story). After receiving the Young Writer's Grant in 1977, Macgregor moved between Melbourne, Mullumbimby and Adelaide as he completed the book. These towns all feature in Propinquity.

After Propinquity, John Macgregor went on to write the treatments (pre-scripts) for the Australian movie Shine, which was nominated for seven Academy Awards. He then entered the world of journalism, writing for some of the major Australian papers as well as The New York Times.

Macgregor now lives in Southeast Asia, working for the native Cambodian NGO Lom Orng.
