= Sancha of Castile, Queen of Aragon =

Queen of Aragon from 1174 to 1196

Sancha of Castile
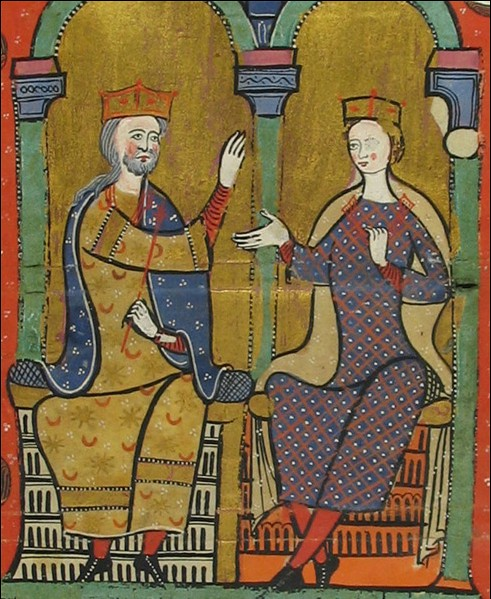
- Sancha of Castile and her husband Alfonso II of Aragon in the 12th-century manuscript Liber Feudorum Maior

Queen consort of Aragon
- Tenure: 18 January 1174 – 25 April 1196
- Born: 21 September 1154/5
- Died: 9 November 1208 (aged 53–54); Villanueva de Sigena, Kingdom of Aragon
- Burial: Monastery of Santa María de Sigena
- Spouse: Alfonso II of Aragon (m. 1174; died 1196)
- Issue among others...: Peter II, King of Aragon; Constance, Queen of Hungary and Holy Roman Empress; Alfonso II, Count of Provence; Eleanor, Countess of Toulouse; Sancha, Countess of Toulouse
- House: Castilian House of Ivrea
- Father: Alfonso VII of León and Castile
- Mother: Richeza of Poland

Sancha of Castile (21 September 1154/5 – 9 November 1208) was the only surviving child of King Alfonso VII of León and Castile and his second wife, Richeza of Poland. He had also given the same name, Sancha, to his daughter by his first wife, Berengaria of Barcelona. This half-sister married King Sancho VI of Navarre in 1153.

Sancha was actively involved in political affairs, particularly in disputes over territorial control, and is recorded as participating in royal governance alongside her her husband Alfonso II. She is also notable for her religious patronage, most prominently as the founder of the Royal Monastery of Santa María de Sigena, which became an important religious and dynastic center.

== Marriage and family ==
On January 18, 1174, Sancha married King Alfonso II of Aragon at Zaragoza, becoming queen consort of Aragon. The marriage contributed to the dynastic alliances among Iberian kingdoms, strengthening political ties between Castile and the Crown of Aragon.

Sancha and Alfonso II had at least eight children who survived into adulthood, many of whom played important roles in European dynastic politics. Their children included Peter II of Aragon, who succeeded his father, and Constance of Aragon, who later became a Holy Roman Empress through her marriage to the Holy Roman Emperor, Frederick II.

== Political activity ==
Sancha's role extended beyond that of simply a ceremonial consort. Reading from her royal charters demonstrates that she actively participated in governance alongside her husband. Surviving documents record a joint grant issued by Alfonso II and Sancha, indicating her formal involvement in royal decision-making.

A patroness of troubadours such as Giraud de Calanson and Peire Raymond, the queen became involved in a legal dispute with her husband concerning properties which formed part of her dower estates. In 1177, she entered the County of Ribagorza and took forcible possession of various castles and fortresses that belonged to the crown there.

== Religious life and patronage ==
After her husband died at Perpignan in 1196, Sancha was relegated to the background of political affairs by her son, Peter II. She retired from court, withdrawing to the Hospitaller convent for noble ladies, the Royal Monastery of Santa María de Sigena, which she had founded.

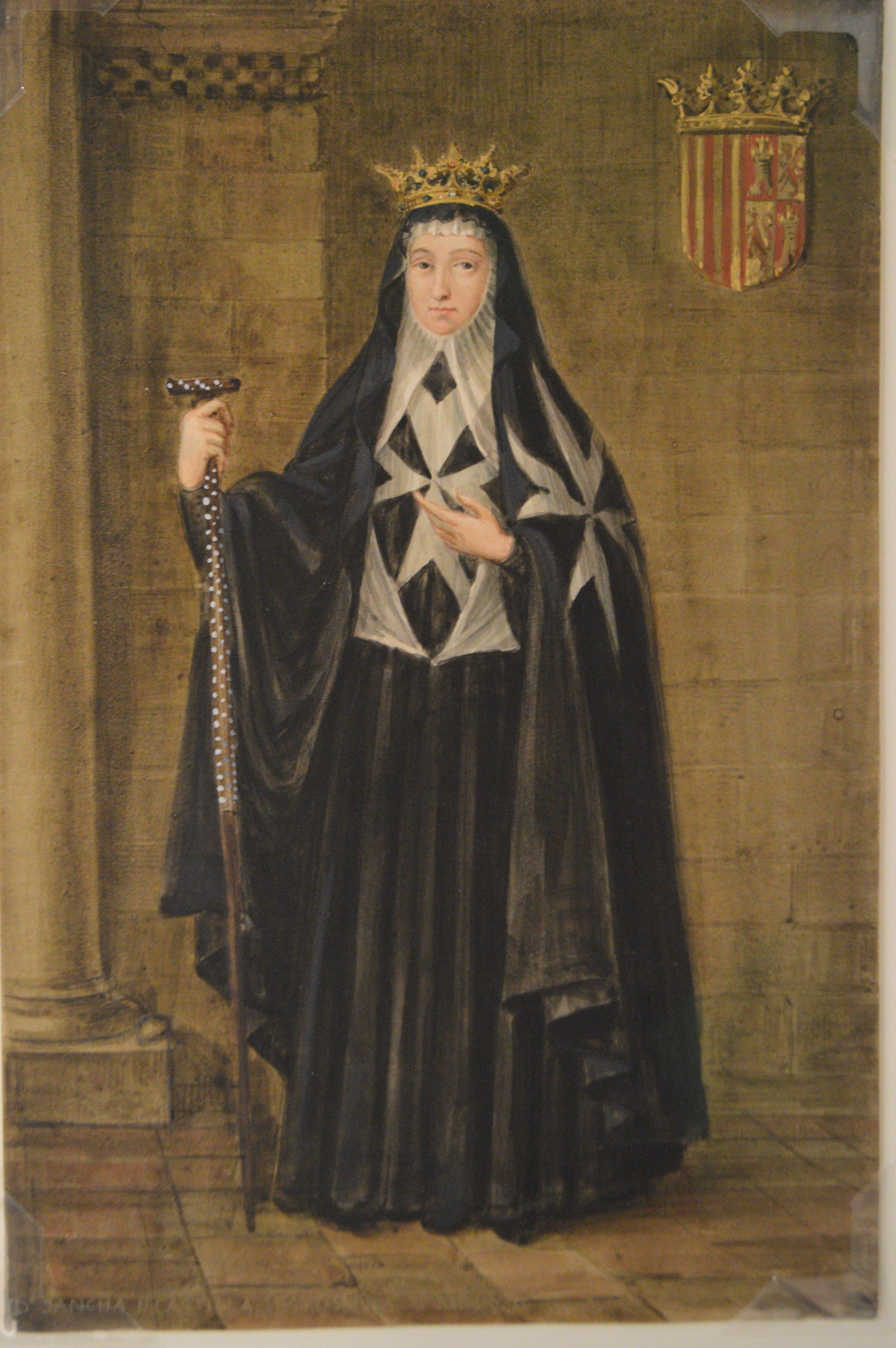
Doña Sancha of Castile, Founder of the Monastery of Sigena. (Painting of Sancha of Castile by Valentín Carderera)

The foundation of Sigena represented a significant act of royal patronage. As scholars have shown, such institutions functioned not only as religious centers but also as spaces of dynastic memory and elite female authority. Sancha maintained close ties to the monastery throughout her life, exercising influence over its organization and community. At Sigena, Sancha assumed the cross of the Knights Hospitaller, reflecting her formal association with the order. The monastery housed noblewomen, including members of the royal family, and served as a site where religious devotion and aristocratic status became intertwined.

Sancha's patronage went beyond financial support and she helped to shape the artistic and religious life of the monastery at Sigena. The chapter house was decorated with wall paintings showing scenes from both the Old and New Testaments, these have been attributed to Sancha by scholars. The monastery also showed how it drew inspiration from outside the Iberian Peninsula. Elements of its imagery and liturgy resemble those associated with the Latin Kingdom of Jerusalem, particularly those linked to the canons of the Holy Sepulchre. Sigena followed a liturgical tradition derived from Jerusalem, and Sancha is recorded to have donated a relic of the Lignum Crucis.

During her later years, Sancha hosted her widowed daughter, Constance of Aragon, at Sigena before Constance's marriage to the Holy Roman Emperor, Frederick II, in 1208. This period in her life shows the continued importance of the monastery as a center of royal and dynastic life.

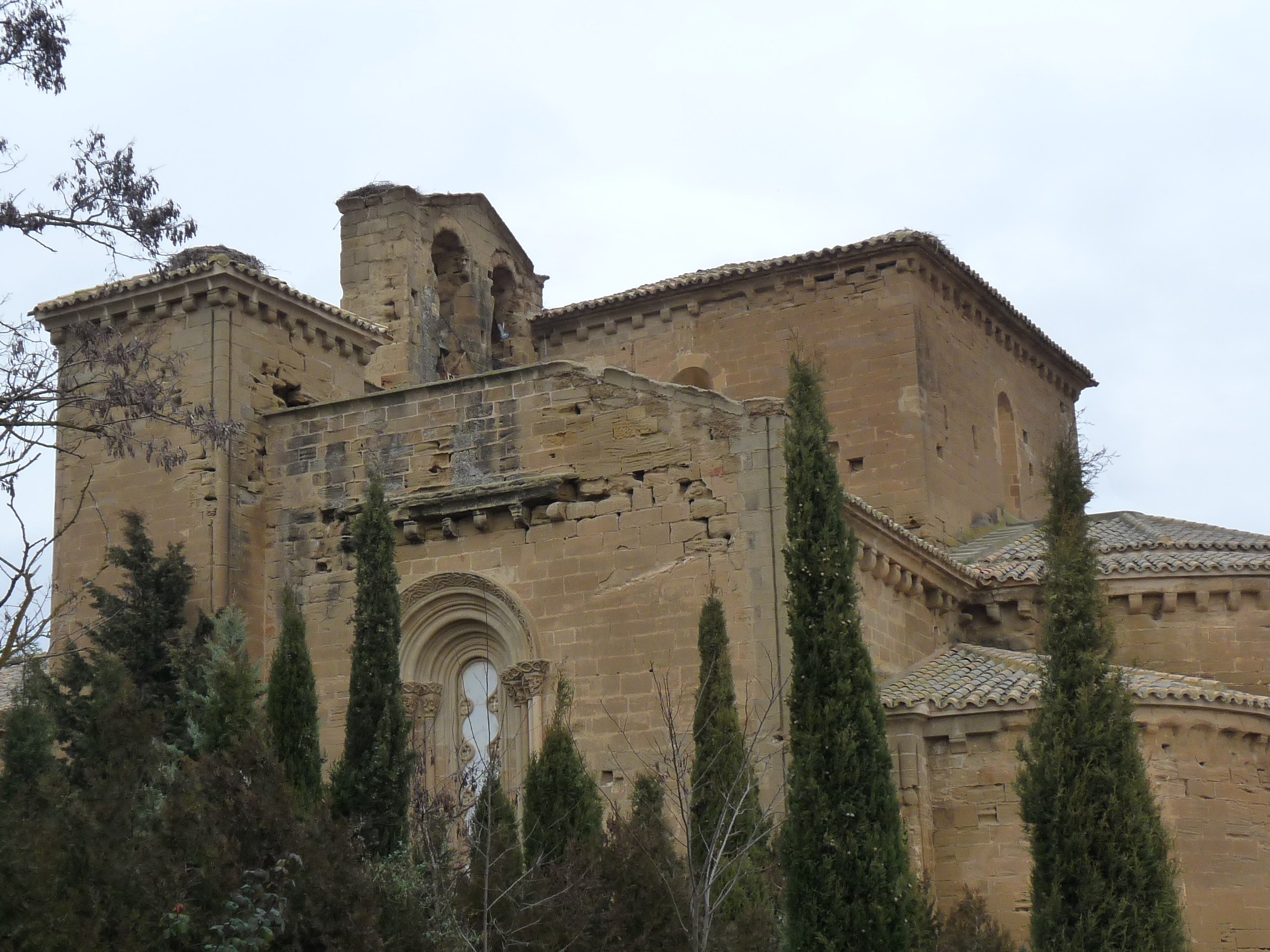
The Royal Monastery of Santa María de Sigena.

== Death and burial ==
Sancha died in 1208, at the age of 54 and was buried in front of the high altar of Sigena, where her tomb remains today.

== Issue ==
- Peter II (1174/76 – 14 September 1213), King of Aragon and Lord of Montpellier.
- Constance (1179 – 23 June 1222), married Emeric, King of Hungary, firstly and secondly Frederick II, Holy Roman Emperor.
- Alfonso II (1180 – February 1209), Count of Provence, Millau and Razès.
- Eleanor (1182 – February 1226), married Count Raymond VI of Toulouse.
- Ramon Berenguer (ca. 1183/85 – died young).
- Sancha (1186 – aft. 1241), married Count Raymond VII of Toulouse, in March 1211
- Ferdinand (1190 – 1249), cistercian monk, Abbot of Montearagón.
- Dulcia (1192 – ?), a nun at Sijena.

== Sources ==
- Doran, John; Smith, Damian J. (2008). Pope Celestine III (1191-1198): Diplomat and Pastor. Ashgate.
- Kedar, Benjamin Z.; Phillips, Jonathan; Riley-Smith, Jonathan, eds. (2005). Crusades. Vol. 4. Ashgate Publishing.
- Luscombe, David; Riley-Smith, Jonathan, eds. (2004). The New Cambridge Medieval History, C.1024-c.1198. Vol. IV. Cambridge University Press.
- Martin, Therese, ed. (2012). Reassessing the Roles of Women as 'Makers' of Medieval Art and Architecture. Brill.

Sancha of Castile, Queen of Aragon Castilian House of Burgundy Cadet branch of the Anscarids Born: 21 September 1154/5 Died: 9 November 1208
Royal titles
Vacant Title last held by Ramon Berenguer IV as consort	Queen consort of Aragon; 1174–1196	Vacant Title next held by Marie of Montpellier
