= Royal Monastery of Santa María de Sigena =

Convent in Aragon, Spain

Monastery of Santa María de Sigena
- Monasterio de Santa María de Sigena (Spanish)
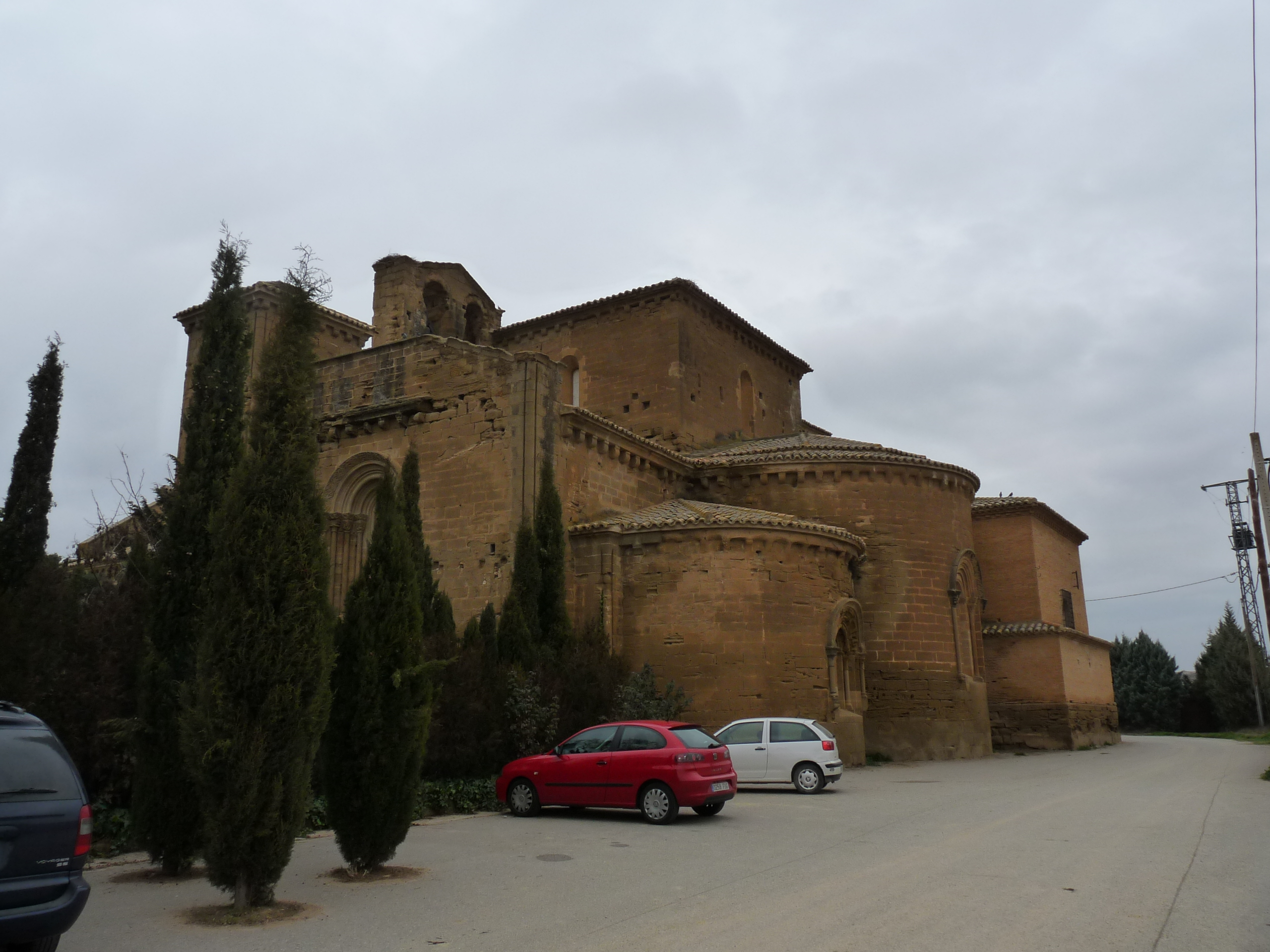
- The Romanesque Monastery of Santa María de Sigena

- Location within Spain
- 41°42′34″N 0°01′10″W
- Type: convent
- Nearest city: Villanueva de Sigena

History
- Formed: 12th century
- Founder: Order of Saint John of Jerusalem
- Built: 1183-1208
- Built for: Kingdom of Aragon

Site notes
- Area: Aragon
- Architectural style: Romanesque
- Restored: 1950s
- Current use: Sisterhood of Belén y de la Asunción de la Virgen

Royal Monastery of Santa María de Sigena (Spanish: Real Monasterio de Santa María de Sigena) is a convent in Villanueva de Sigena, region of Aragon, Spain. Built between 1183 and 1208, the Romanesque church was founded by Queen Sancha of Castile, wife of Alfonso II of Aragon.

The convent church is based on the shape of the Latin cross. It has a single nave, a wide transept and three apse chapels. There are also elements from Cistercian and Mudéjar architecture such as in the roofs and windows. The main entrance portal features fourteen archivolts.

== History ==
The convent was operated by the Order of Saint John of Jerusalem. It flourished in the 14th century thanks to royal support but declined after the crown of Aragon merged with Castile. Several royal burials were made in the convent church, including Sancha of Castile, Queen of Aragon, who lived out her last years and died there after being marginalized by her son Pedro II of Aragon, who is also interred there along with two of his sisters.

In 1835, after the Ecclesiastical Confiscations of Mendizábal deprived it of most of its revenues, the convent was abandoned by its religious community, although some nuns later returned. The Romanesque convent was largely destroyed by fire in 1936 by anti-clerical Anarchist militiamen in the Spanish Civil War. Restoration of the convent began in the 1950s. The Romanesque cloister was restored in 1974. Artworks still in place include the royal tombs of Sancha and Peter of Aragon, while the former abbess' throne was moved to the Lleida Museum.

In 1985 nuns from the Sisterhood of Bethlehem took over the convent.

== Major artworks ==
The church contains royal tombs of the House of Aragon. The Romanesque cloister, once in ruins, owes its current appearance to a 1974 reconstruction. Artworks still in place include the royal tombs of Sancha and Peter of Aragón, while the former abbess' throne is in the Diocesan and Comarcal Museum of Lleida.

The chapter house housed extremely important Romanesque frescos of about 1200 by largely English artists, probably including some of those who produced the Winchester Bible; this was only realized after their destruction. The artists also appear to have visited Palermo before Sigena, as some influence from mosaics there can be seen. The frescos had been fully photographed in black and white shortly before their destruction, and the remaining damaged sections, mostly having lost their colour, were moved to the Museu Nacional d'Art de Catalunya in Barcelona in 1936.

The Master of Sigena (Maestro de Sigena) is an early 16th-century painter who painted a large altarpiece for the church between 1510 and 1521, panels from which are now exhibited at the Prado Museum in Madrid, the Museum of Santa Cruz (Toledo) and the museum in Zaragoza.

== Artefacts dispute ==
Although the Monastery of Sigena, the royal pantheon of Aragon, was declared a National Monument, later, in 1923, much of its art was taken to Catalonia. It began with the stripping of the unique Romanesque paintings (13th century) from the chapter house during the Spanish Civil War in the 1930s.

In April 2015 and July 2016, two Spanish courts ruled that MNAC and the Generalitat de Catalunya had to return the murals and 97 works of art and objects stored or exhibited in the MNAC and in the Lleida Museum.

Even though it was mandatory to comply with the court rulings, only 51 pieces of the 97 from the monastery have been returned. The mural paintings from the chapter house still remain in the MNAC. A Social Platform (www.sijenasi.com) was created in order achieve the return of the assets from the Monastery of Sigena. In December 2017, the Spanish government began removing the remaining artefacts from museums in Catalonia.

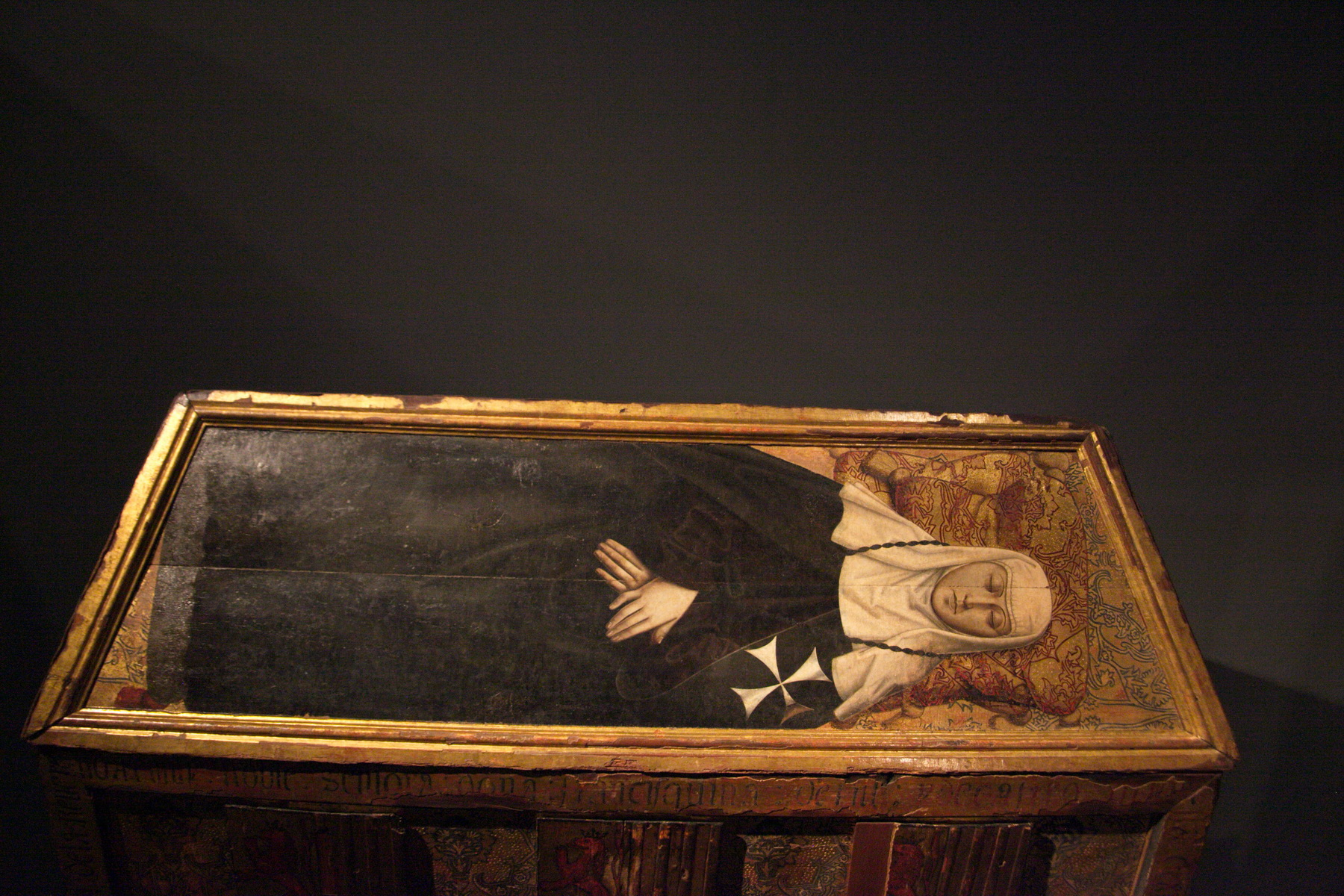
One of the sepulchres returned to the Monastery of Sigena from Lleida Museum.

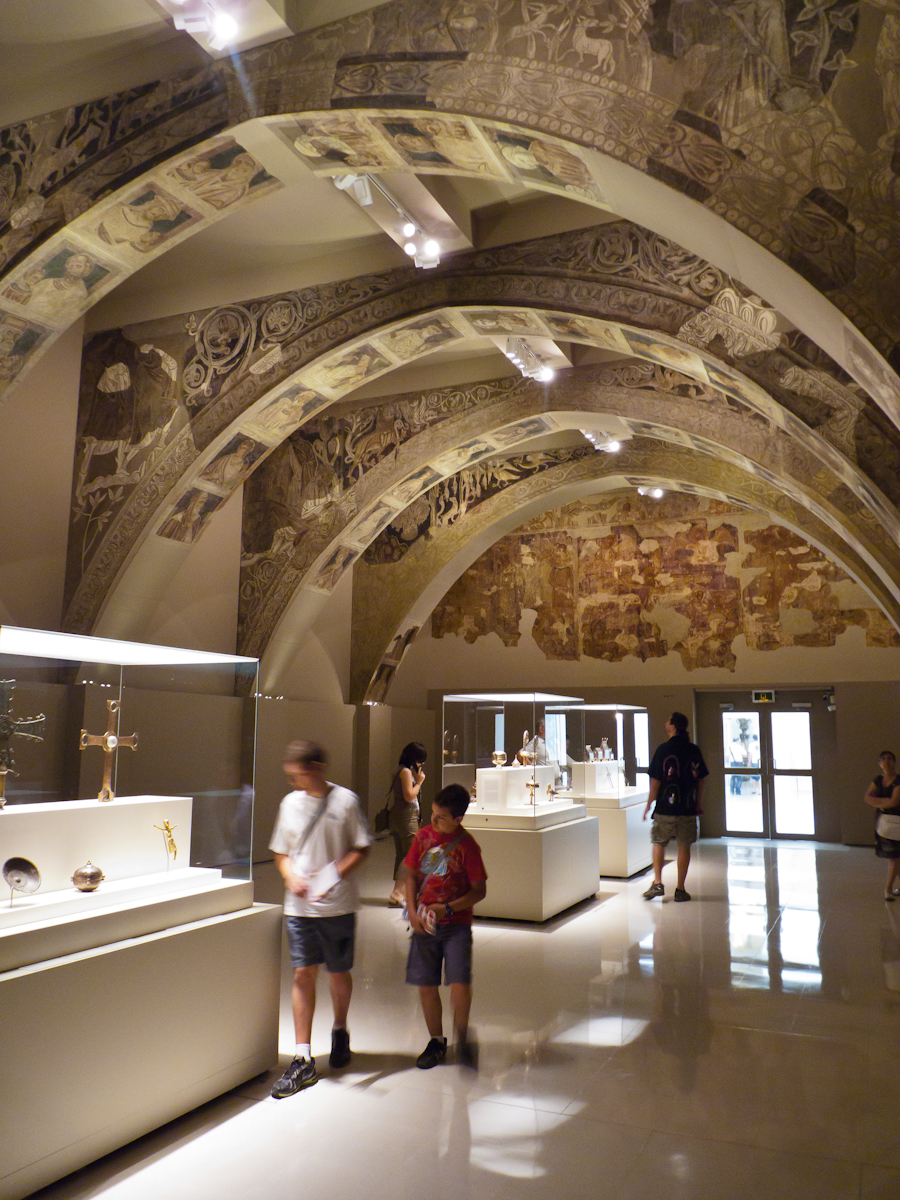
Paintings from the chapter house of the Monastery of Sigena at the Museu Nacional d'Art de Catalunya in Barcelona.

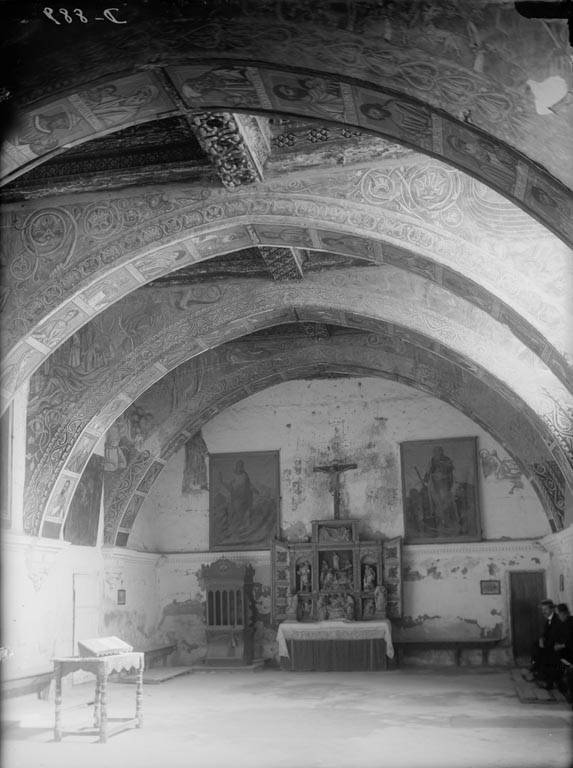
The chapter house and its frescos, before 1914

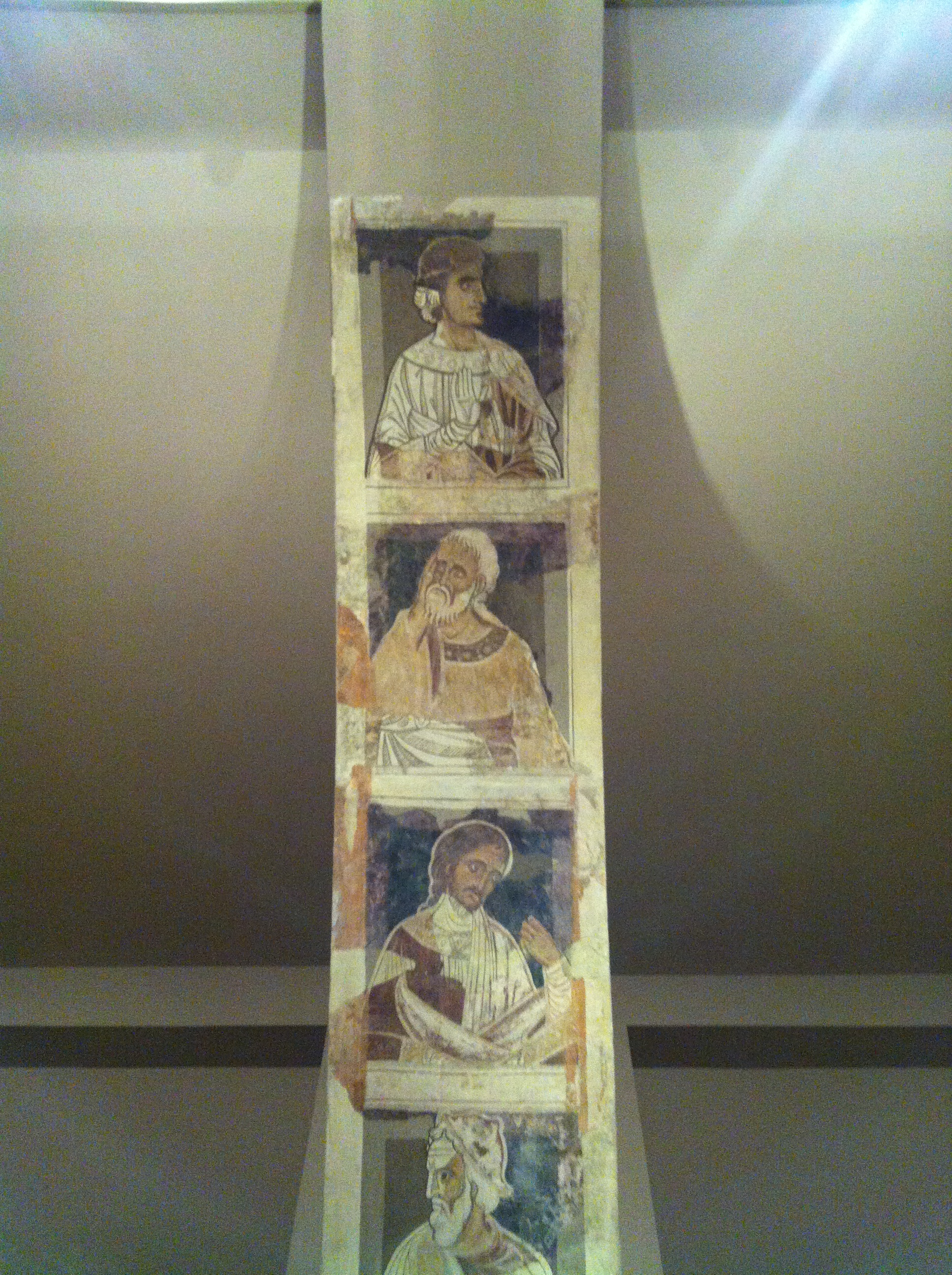
Detail from the chapter house, now in the Museu Nacional d'Art de Catalunya in Barcelona

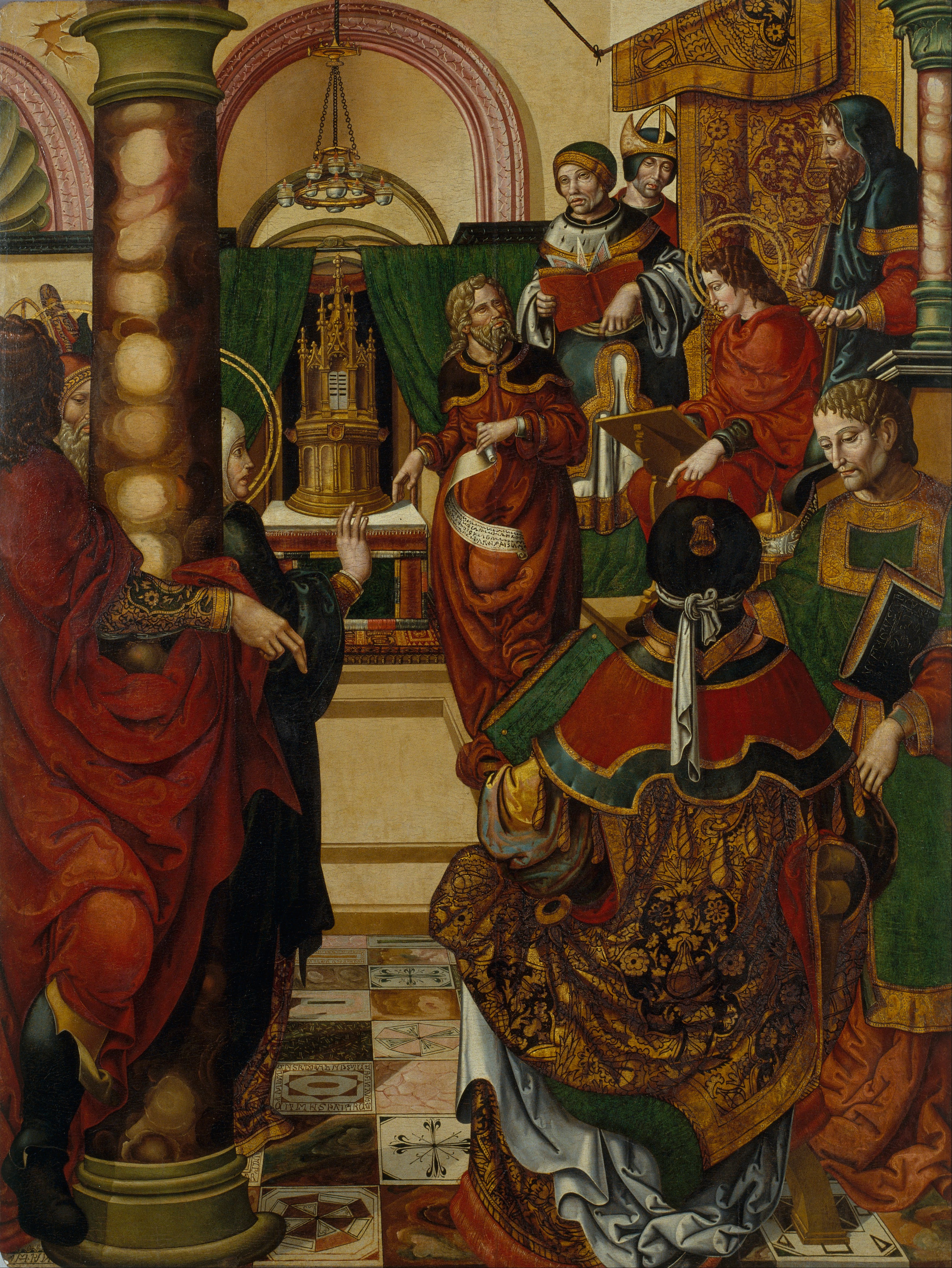
Master of Sigena, Jesus amongst the Doctors of the Law, now MNAC

== Sources ==
- Gonzalez, Eileen McKiernan (2012). "Reception, Gender, and Memory:Elisenda de Montcada and Her Dual-Effigy Tomb at Santa Maria de Pedralbes". In Martin, Therese (ed.). Reassessing the Roles of Women as 'Makers' of Medieval Art and Architecture. Vol. 1. Brill.
- Oakeshott, Walter, Sigena: Romanesque Painting in Spain & the Winchester Bible Artists, London, 1972, Harvey, Miller and Medcalf. ISBN 0-8212-0497-1
- Rincón García, Wifredo (2000). Tesoros de España 7: Monasterios. Espasa-Calpe. ISBN 84-239-6671-2.
