= Beatrice of Béziers =

Beatrice of Béziers was the second wife of Raymond VI of Toulouse. Together they had one daughter, Constance of Toulouse. Beatrice was repudiated in 1189 and she retired to a Cathar nunnery. It was said she became a Cathar parfaite (a woman Cathar pastor).

== Sources ==
- Cheyette, Fredric L. (2001). Ermengard of Narbonne and the World of the Troubadours. Cornell University Press.
- McNamara, Jo Ann (1996). Sisters in Arms: Catholic Nuns Through Two Millennia. Harvard University Press.
- William of Puylaurens (2003). The Chronicle of William of Puylaurens: The Albigensian Crusade and Its Aftermath. Translated by Sibley, W.A.; Sibley, M.D. The Boydell Press.
