= Berengaria of Navarre =

Queen of England from 1191 to 1199

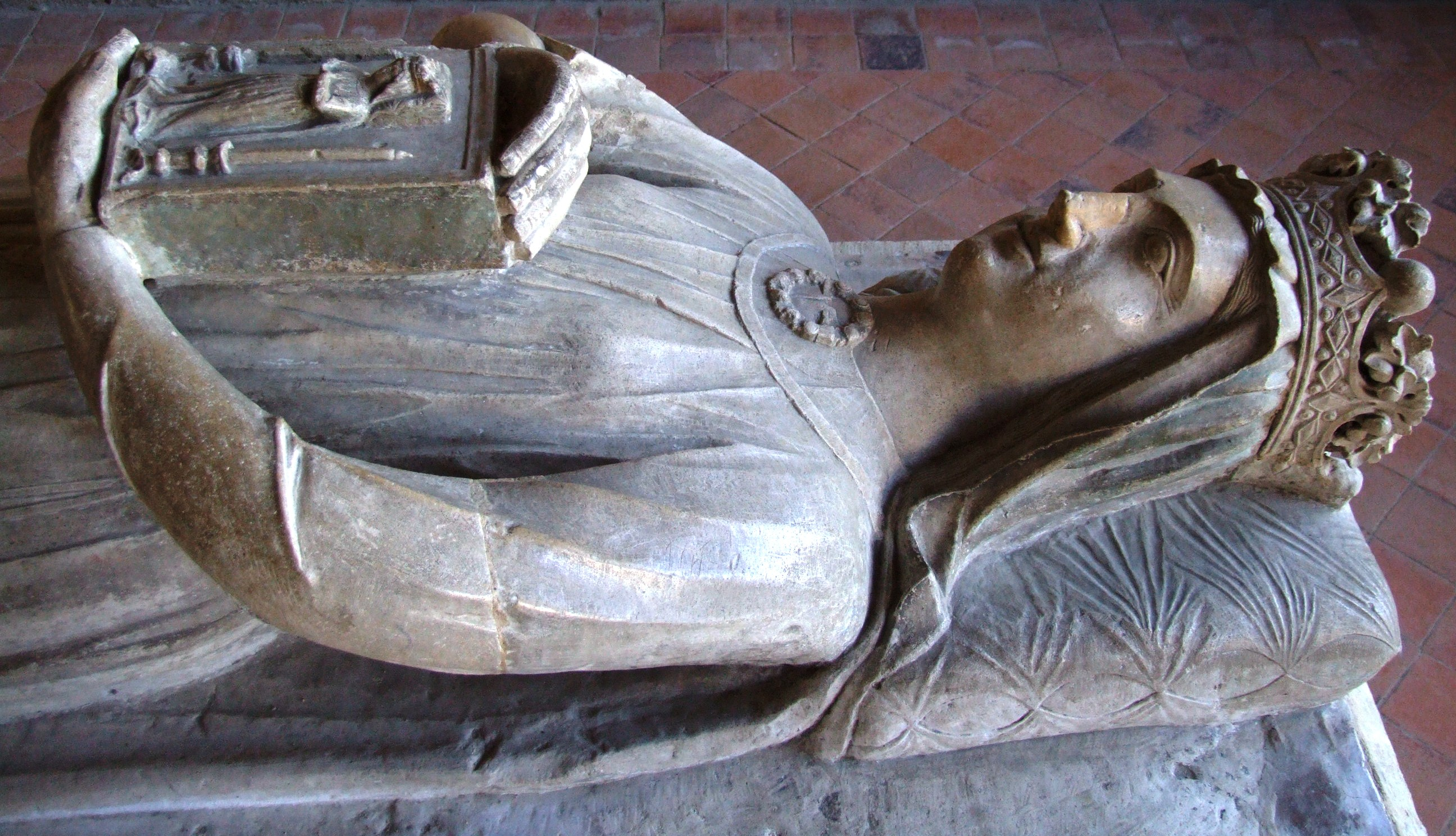
- Effigy of Berengaria in the chapter house of L'Épau Abbey, Le Mans, which she founded

Queen consort of England
- Tenure: 12 May 1191 – 6 April 1199
- Coronation: 12 May 1191
- Born: c. 1165–1170
- Died: 23 December 1230 (aged 59–65)
- Burial: L'Épau Abbey, Le Mans, France
- Spouse: Richard I of England (m. 1191; died 1199)
- House: Jiménez
- Father: Sancho VI of Navarre
- Mother: Sancha of Castile

Berengaria of Navarre (Basque: Berengela, Spanish: Berenguela, French: Bérengère; c. 1165–1170 – 23 December 1230) was Queen of England as the wife of Richard I of England. She was the eldest daughter of Sancho VI of Navarre and Sancha of Castile. As is the case with many of the medieval English queens, little is known of her life.

Berengaria has traditionally been known as "the only English queen never to set foot in the country". She may have visited England after her husband's death, but did not do so before. Berengaria saw Richard very little during their marriage, which was childless. She did (unusually for the wife of a crusader) accompany him on the start of the Third Crusade, but mostly lived in his French possessions. There, she gave generously to the church, despite difficulties in collecting the pension she was due from Richard's brother and successor John after she became a widow.

== Early years ==
Berengaria was born in Navarre c. 1165 as the eldest daughter of Sancho VI of Navarre and Sancha of Castile.

In 1185, Berengaria was given the fief of Monreal in Navarre by her father. Eleanor of Aquitaine promoted the engagement of Berengaria to her son Richard the Lionheart. An alliance with Navarre meant protection for the southern borders of Eleanor's Duchy of Aquitaine and helped create better relations with neighbouring Castile, whose queen was Richard's sister Eleanor. Also, Navarre had assimilated the troubadour culture of Aquitaine and Berengaria's reputation was unbesmirched. It seems that Berengaria and Richard did in fact meet once, years before their marriage, and writers have claimed that there was an attraction between them at that time.

In 1190, Eleanor met King Sancho VI in Pamplona, and he hosted a banquet in the Royal Palace of Olite in her honour. The betrothal could not be celebrated openly, for Richard had been betrothed for many years to Alys, half-sister of King Philip II of France. Richard terminated his betrothal to Alys in 1190 while at Messina. It has been suggested that Alys had become the mistress of Richard's own father, Henry II of England, and possibly the mother of an illegitimate child; a marriage between Richard and Alys therefore would have been technically impossible for religious reasons of affinity.

== Marriage ==
Richard had Berengaria brought to him by his mother Eleanor of Aquitaine. Because Richard was already on the Third Crusade, having wasted no time in setting off after his coronation, the two women had a long and difficult journey to catch up with him. They arrived at Messina in Sicily in 1191 during Lent (when the marriage could not take place) and were joined by Richard's sister Joan, the widowed queen of Sicily. Berengaria was left in Joan's custody. En route to the Holy Land, the ship carrying Berengaria and Joan ran aground off the coast of Cyprus, and they were threatened by the island's ruler, Isaac Comnenus. Richard came to their rescue, captured the island, and overthrew Comnenus. Berengaria married Richard the Lionheart on 12 May 1191 in the Chapel of St. George at Limassol on Cyprus and was crowned the same day by the archbishop of Bordeaux and the bishops of Évreux and Bayonne.

== Queen consort ==
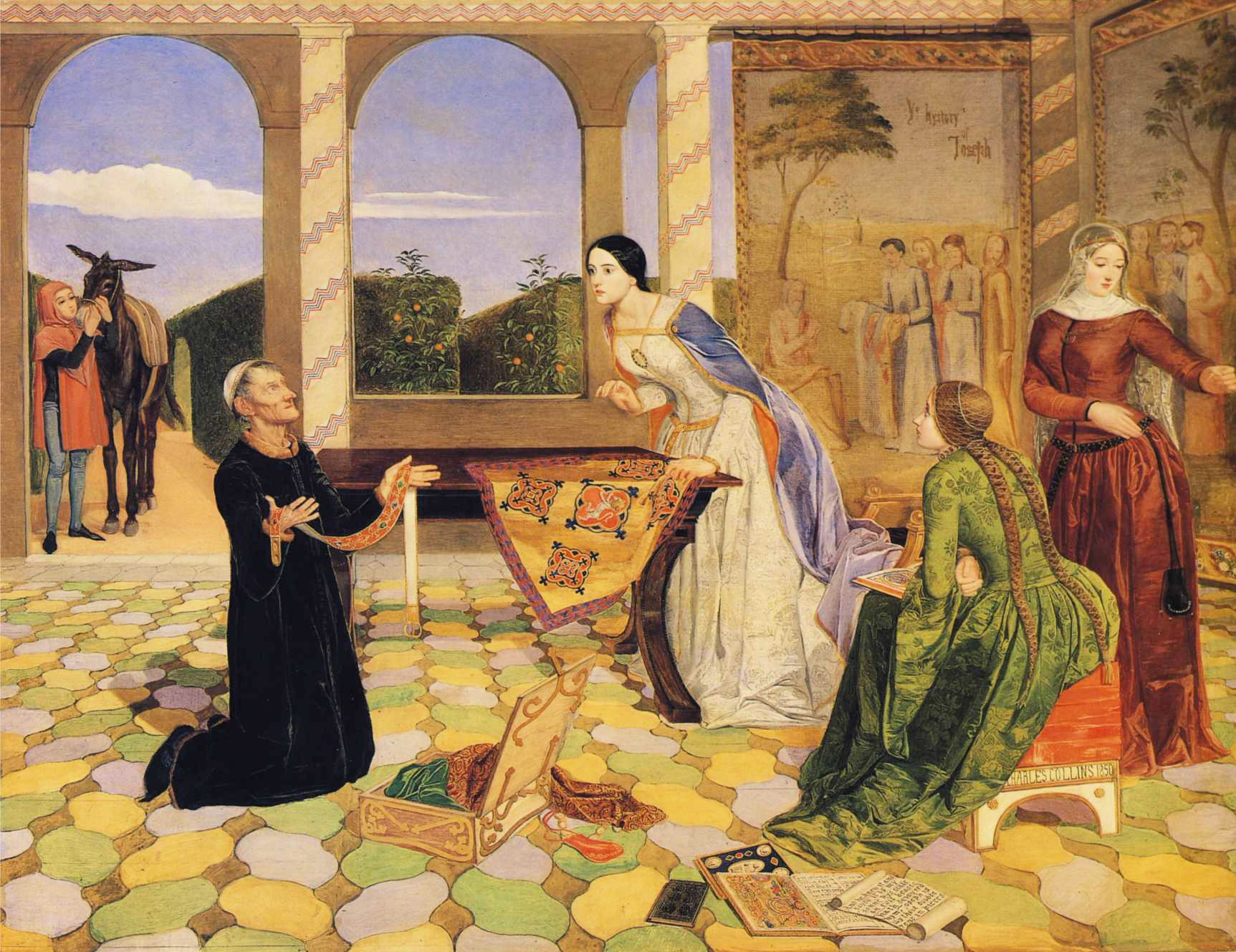
Berengaria's Alarm (Charles Allston Collins, 1850)

Whether the marriage was ever even consummated is a matter for conjecture. In any case, Richard certainly took his new wife with him for the first part of the Third Crusade. This was unusual (although Richard's mother and Berengaria's predecessor, Eleanor of Aquitaine, had, when queen of France, been with her husband throughout the Second Crusade). Berengaria returned well before Richard left the Holy Land; on his return to Europe, he was captured and imprisoned. Berengaria remained in Europe, based at Beaufort-en-Vallée, attempting to raise money for his ransom.

After his release, Richard returned to England and was not joined by his wife. Richard then set about reclaiming the territories in France that had been lost by his brother John or taken by King Philip II. His focus was on his kingdom, not his queen. He was ordered by Pope Celestine III to reunite with Queen Berengaria and to show fidelity to her in the future. Richard, now mostly spending his time in France, obeyed and took Berengaria to church every week thereafter. When he died in 1199, she was distressed, perhaps more so at deliberately being overlooked as queen of England. Some historians believe that Berengaria honestly loved her husband, and Richard's feelings for her were merely formal because the marriage was a political rather than a romantic union.

== Queen dowager ==
Berengaria never visited England during King Richard's lifetime, and Richard spent less than six months in England while they were married. There is evidence, however, that she may have done so in the years following his death, since she is believed to have been present at the translation of St Thomas Becket's remains at Canterbury in 1220. The traditional description of her as "the only English queen never to set foot in the country" still would be true because she did not visit England during the time she was Richard's consort. She certainly sent envoys to England several times, mainly to inquire about the pension she was due as dowager queen and Richard's widow, which King John failed to pay. Although Queen Eleanor intervened and Pope Innocent III threatened him with an interdict if he did not pay Berengaria what was due, King John still owed her more than £4,000 (equivalent to £6,609,088 in 2025) when he died. The payments were eventually made during the reign of John's son Henry III of England.

=== Lady of Le Mans ===
Berengaria became the Lady (Lord) of Le Mans, one of her dower properties, where she eventually settled. She founded L'Épau Abbey in Le Mans in 1229, where she was buried. In 1240, Archbishop Rodrigo Jimenez de Rada of Toledo wrote of Berengaria that she lived "as a most praiseworthy widow and stayed for the most part in the city of Le Mans, which she held as part of her marriage dower, devoting herself to almsgiving, prayer and good works, witnessing as an example to all women of chastity and religion and in the same city she came to the end of her days with a happy death." A skeleton thought to be hers was rediscovered in 1960 during the restoration of the abbey. These remains are preserved beneath the stone effigy of the queen, which is now to be found in the chapter house of the abbey.

== Historical significance ==
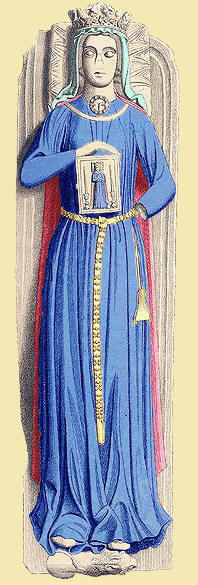
Coloured illustration of Berengaria's tomb effigy

Historian Ann Trindade says about Berengaria that she "is remembered as a benefactor of several... religious congregations and institutions and was regarded as a model of piety." She also states that "Berengaria’s life illustrates very clearly the constraints under which medieval women, even aristocratic ones, were obliged to live." Berengaria's struggles are a good example of what many women faced in the thirteenth century, and "those long years of widowhood reveal, on the basis of record, a strong courageous woman, independent, solitary, battling against difficult political and economic circumstances, with little interest in the trappings of courtly existence, sustained by her faith in Christianity and her loyalty to the See of St Peter, not afraid to assert her rights against powerful enemies, both lay and clerical."

== In fiction ==
Novels featuring Berengaria include:

- Propinquity by John Macgregor
- The Heart Of The Lion by Jean Plaidy
- Willow Maid by Maureen Peters
- My Lord Brother the Lionheart by Molly Costain Haycraft
- The Lute Player by Norah Lofts
- Standard of Honor by Jack Whyte
- The Talisman by Sir Walter Scott
- Winning His Spurs by G. A. Henty
- Valentina by Fern Michaels
- The Queen's Witch by Cecelia Holland
- Lionheart by Sharon Kay Penman
- The Passionate Brood by Margaret Campbell Barnes
- The Boy Knight by G.A. Henty
- Queen Without a Country by Rachel Bard
- Shield of Three Lions by Pamela Kaufman
- Banners of Gold by Pamela Kaufman
- The Autumn Throne by Elizabeth Chadwick

== On the stage ==
- Holy Warriors by David Eldridge, premiered at Shakespeare's Globe in July and August 2014.

== In the media ==
In the 1923 film Richard the Lion-Hearted, Queen Berengaria is played by Kathleen Clifford. The 1935 film The Crusades, starring Loretta Young and Henry Wilcoxon, tells a fictionalised story of Richard and Berengaria's marriage. The 1954 historical drama film King Richard and the Crusaders, starring George Sanders and Paula Raymond, shows Richard and Berengaria as married and on the Third Crusade. The 1960s British television series Richard the Lionheart features their marriage prominently, with Berengaria played by Sheila Whittingham. All versions were highly romanticised and are not reliable sources of information about the queen. Berengaria was played by Laila Taher in the 1963 film Saladin. She was played by Zoë Wanamaker in the BBC 13-part drama The Devil's Crown (1978).

Royal titles
Vacant Title last held by Eleanor of Aquitaine	Queen consort of the English; 12 May 1191 – 6 April 1199	Vacant Title next held by Isabella of Angoulême
